= List of county routes in Oneida County, New York =

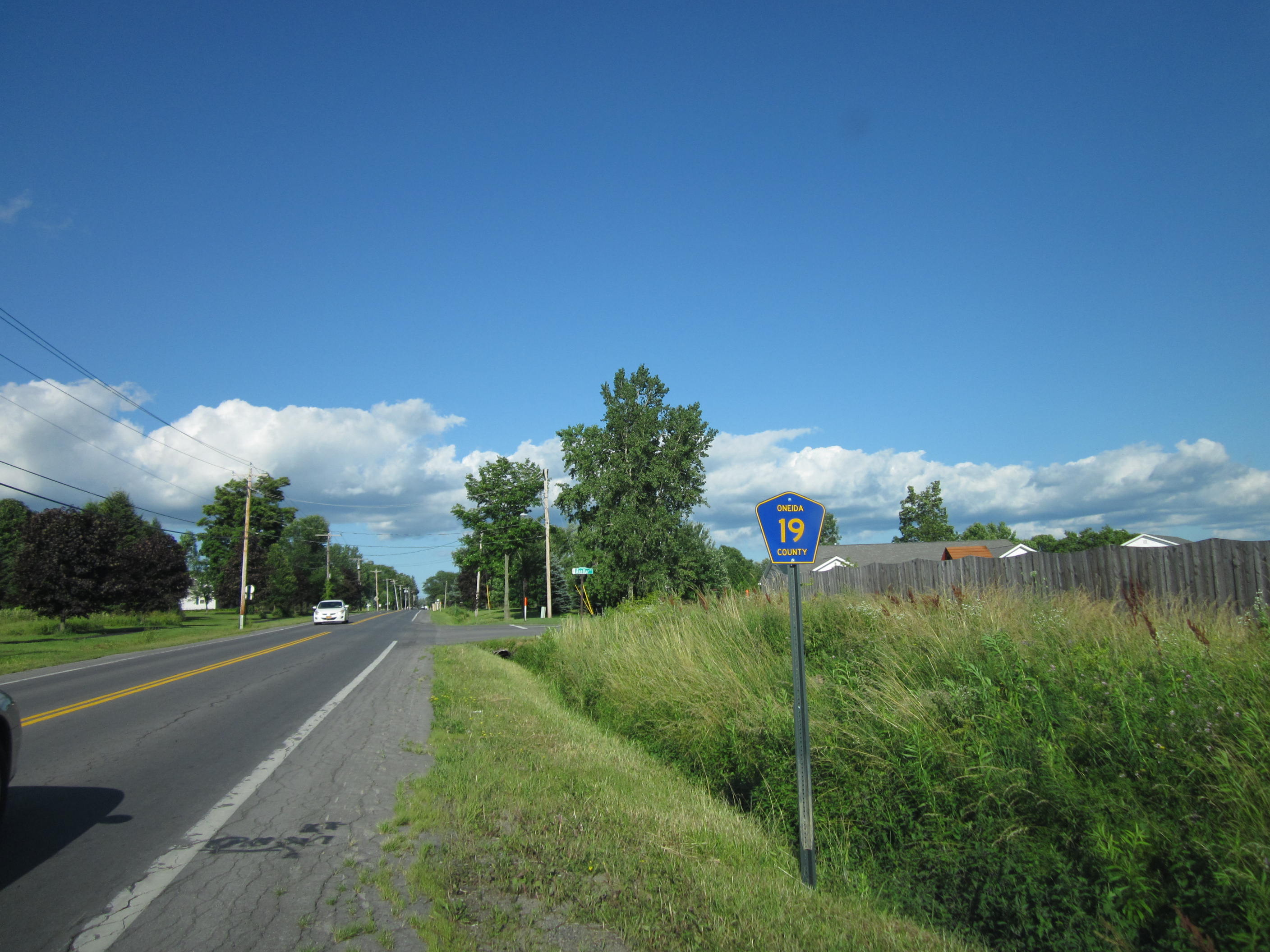
- The current standard of county route signage in Oneida County.

Highway names
- Interstates: Interstate X (I-X)
- US Highways: U.S. Route X (US X)
- State: New York State Route X (NY X)
- County: County Route X (CR X)

System links
- New York Highways; Interstate; US; State; Reference; Parkways

County routes in Oneida County, New York, are generally signed with the Manual on Uniform Traffic Control Devices-standard yellow-on-blue pentagon route marker. County Route 840 (CR 840) was once the only signed county route within Oneida County. Additional markers went up in 2014.

== Routes 1–50 ==
Route	Length (mi)	Length (km)	From	Via	To	Notes
CR 1	2.18	3.51	NY 8	Babcock Hill Road in Bridgewater	Herkimer County line (becomes CR 91)	
CR 2	8.37	13.47	Otsego County line in Bridgewater (becomes CR 18)	East Street and Stone and Holman City roads	CR 20 in Paris	
CR 2A	1.18	1.90	Herkimer County line (becomes CR 141)	Stone Road in Bridgewater	CR 2	
CR 3	3.31	5.33	Oriskany Falls village line in Marshall	Sanger Hill Road	Waterville village line in Sangerfield	
CR 4	2.56	4.12	NY 8	Mapledale Road in Bridgewater	NY 8	
CR 5	1.23	1.98	CR 2	Cedar Lake Road in Paris	Herkimer County line (becomes CR 175)	
CR 5A	3.04	4.89	US 20	Donley Road in Bridgewater	CR 4	
CR 6	4.66	7.50	Madison County line (becomes CR 78)	Mason Road in Sangerfield	US 20	
CR 6A	4.35	7.00	Madison County line (becomes CR 99)	Beaver Creek Road in Sangerfield	US 20	
CR 7	5.23	8.42	End of county maintenance in Paris	Summit Road and Main Street	NY 8 in Paris	
CR 8	3.05	4.91	CR 6	Pleasant Valley and Saw Mill roads in Sangerfield	CR 3	
CR 8A	3.04	4.89	CR 3 in Sangerfield	Brothertown Road	NY 315 in Marshall	
CR 9	12.20	19.63	NY 12B in Marshall	Burnham, Shanley, Paris Hill, and Pinnacle roads	Herkimer County line in Paris (becomes CR 59)	
CR 9A	0.62	1.00	NY 12	Old Route 12 in Paris	Cul-de-sac	
CR 10	2.94	4.73	Madison County line (becomes CR 41)	Augusta–Solsville Road in Augusta	NY 26	
CR 10A	3.02	4.86	NY 26 in Augusta	Wells–Gifford Road	Skinner Road in Vernon	
CR 11	6.28	10.11	Madison County line in Augusta (becomes CR 40)	Knoxboro and West Hill roads	NY 12B / NY 315 in Marshall	
CR 12	8.06	12.97	NY 26 in Augusta	North and Marble roads	Sherrill city line in Vernon	Discontinuous at Simmons Road
CR 12A	2.87	4.62	CR 12 in Augusta	Burns Road	CR 12 in Vernon	
CR 13	16.23	26.12	NY 5 in Vernon	Youngs and College Hill roads, Kellogg Street, and Red Hill and Roberts roads	Herkimer County line (becomes CR 16) in Paris	Split into four segments by three state and locally maintained segments (Note: CR 13 is split by the easternmost part of NY 31 in Vernon, NY 922C and NY 412 in the village of Clinton, and Oneida Street (former NY 8) south of Utica.)
CR 14	2.93	4.72	Waterville village line	Hanover Road in Marshall	CR 9	
CR 15	4.71	7.58	NY 12B in Kirkland	Brimfield Street and Tibbitts Road	CR 26 in New Hartford	
CR 15A	2.46	3.96	NY 5 in Westmoreland	Norton Avenue	NY 233 in Kirkland	
CR 16	3.61	5.81	CR 9 in Marshall	Post Street	NY 12B in Kirkland	
CR 17	3.91	6.29	NY 12 in Paris	Fountain Street	Clinton village line in Kirkland	
CR 18	3.02	4.86	CR 7	Brennan, Miller, and Doolittle roads in Paris	CR 9	
CR 18A	1.34	2.16	CR 7	Davis Road in Paris	CR 18	
CR 19	7.54	12.13	CR 46 in Westmoreland	South and Main streets and Clark Mills Road	CR 30 in Whitestown	
CR 20	5.18	8.34	Clayville village line in Paris	Church Road and Mohawk Street	CR 24A in New Hartford	
CR 21 (1)	0.39	0.63	CR 30	Clinton Street in New Hartford	NY 5A	
CR 21 (2)	0.11	0.18	Cul-de-sac	Clinton Street in New Hartford	New Hartford village line	
CR 22	0.82	1.32	Herkimer County line (becomes CR 59)	Pleasant Street and Sherman Drive in New Hartford	Utica city line	
CR 23	11.64	18.73	Vernon village line in Vernon	Cooper, Furnace, and Cider streets	Oriskany village line in Whitestown	Discontinuous at Sucker Brook
CR 24	2.46	3.96	Oneida Street	Chapman and Valley View roads in New Hartford	Utica city line	
CR 24A	3.31	5.33	Utica city line	Higby Road in New Hartford	Herkimer County line (becomes CR 186)	
CR 25 (1)	4.38	7.05	Madison County line (becomes CR 51)	Kenwood Road and Peterboro Street in Vernon	Vernon village line	Includes spur to CR 34 at Madison County line
CR 25 (2)	0.12	0.19	NY 5	Hamilton Street in Vernon	Sherrill city line	
CR 26 (1)	1.06	1.71	Oneida Street	Kellogg and Oxford roads in New Hartford	New Hartford village line	
CR 26 (2)	1.40	2.25	Cul-de-sac in New Hartford	Campion Road and New Hartford and Henderson streets	CR 30 in Whitestown	Discontinuous at New Hartford village limits
CR 26A	1.47	2.37	Oneida Street	Oxford Road in New Hartford	CR 26	
CR 27	2.02	3.25	CR 32 / CR 840	Westmoreland Street in Whitestown	Whitesboro village line	
CR 29	2.34	3.77	CR 92	Cosby Manor Road in Deerfield	Herkimer County line (becomes CR 26)	
CR 30	7.92	12.75	NY 5 / NY 5B in New Hartford	Middle Settlement Road, Clinton Street, and Cavanaugh, Morgan, and Church roads	CR 91 in Marcy	Discontinuous between Whitesboro village line and NY 49 (Note: Clinton Street and Cavanaugh Road are connected by Mohawk Street, and Clinton and Mohawk streets are state-maintained as NY 922A between NY 69 and NY 49.)
CR 31	2.60	4.18	CR 91	Miller Road in Deerfield	CR 92	
CR 32 (1)	7.34	11.81	Clinton village line in Kirkland	Kirkland Avenue, Clinton and Westmoreland streets, and Valley Road	Oriskany village line in Whitestown	Discontinuous at NY 5 and CR 840
CR 32	1.95	3.14	NY 922E at NY 49	Oriskany and Benton roads in Marcy	NY 291	Discontinuous at CR 88
CR 34	2.36	3.80	River Road	Marcy-Suny IT Parkway and Edic Road in Marcy	CR 36	
CR 35	3.77	6.07	Holland Patent village line	Powell Road in Trenton	CR 91	
CR 36	6.27	10.09	Deerfield town line in Marcy	Glass Factory Road	CR 35 in Trenton	Includes spur to CR 91 (Burton Manor Road) at south end
CR 37	7.90	12.71	NY 365 in Trenton	Maple Dale and North Gage roads	Herkimer County line in Deerfield (becomes CR 65)	
CR 37A	4.10	6.60	CR 38 in Marcy	Coombs Road	CR 91 in Trenton	
CR 38	8.95	14.40	NY 291 in Marcy	Fox and Thompson roads	CR 56 in Steuben	Discontinuous at Holland Patent village limits
CR 39	1.09	1.75	NY 365 in Floyd	Mill, Main, and Railroad streets	Fish Lane Road in Marcy	
CR 40	3.30	5.31	CR 840 in Whitestown	Coleman Mills Road	NY 233 / CR 42 in Rome	
CR 40A	0.73	1.17	CR 40 in Whitestown	Monument Road	NY 69 in Rome	
CR 41	3.30	5.31	NY 26	Dix Road in Westmoreland	NY 233	
CR 42	5.16	8.30	CR 52 in Westmoreland	Bartlett Road	NY 233 / CR 40 in Rome	
CR 42A	3.15	5.07	NY 26	Eureka Road in Westmoreland	CR 42	
CR 43	3.16	5.09	NY 31 in Vernon	Town Line Road	NY 26 in Westmoreland	
CR 43A	1.42	2.29	CR 48A	Beacon Light Road in Verona	NY 31	
CR 44	1.81	2.91	CR 41 in Westmoreland	Lawrence Street	NY 26 / NY 365 in Rome	
CR 45	0.89	1.43	Madison County line	Sconondoa Road in Verona	NY 365	
CR 46	11.42	18.38	Oriskany Falls village line in Augusta	Skyline Drive and Deans Highway	CR 23 in Westmoreland	
CR 47	14.07	22.64	NY 46 in Rome	Wright Settlement, Penny Street, Butternut, Cemetery, Watson Hollow, Camroden, Crill, and Korber roads	NY 365 in Trenton	
CR 48	2.39	3.85	CR 89	Randel Road in Verona	CR 45	
CR 48A	2.59	4.17	Sherrill city line in Vernon	Williams Street and Patrick Road	NY 365 in Verona	
CR 49	0.62	1.00	CR 37	Toad Hollow Road in Trenton	NY 28	
CR 50	4.58	7.37	New London Road in Verona	Main Street and Verona Mills and Greenway–New London roads	CR 83 in Rome	
CR 50A	6.19	9.96	NY 13 / NY 49 in Vienna	Vienna and Higginsville roads	NY 46 in Verona	Discontinuous at Erie Canal

== Routes 51 and up ==
Route	Length (mi)	Length (km)	From	Via	To	Notes
CR 51	0.11	0.18	Prospect village line	Park Avenue in Trenton	Herkimer County line (becomes CR 113)	
CR 52 (1)	15.04	24.20	CR 50A in Verona	Doxtator, Senn, Blackman Corners, and Lowell roads	CR 23 in Westmoreland	
CR 52 (2)	3.66	5.89	NY 233 in Westmoreland	East Main Street and Stone and Halsey roads	CR 19 in Whitestown	
CR 53	23.36	37.59	NY 69 in Annsville	Taberg–Lee Center, Stokes, Westernville, Gifford Hill, South Hill, Floyd–Steuben, Fuller, Francis and Starr Hill roads	CR 72A in Remsen	Split into four segments by three state and locally maintained sections (Note: The four segments of CR 53 are linked by the locally-maintained Main Street (former NY 46) in Westernville, a segment of NY 274, and the northern half of NY 920V.)
CR 54	4.39	7.07	NY 13	Oneida Street and Jug Point Road in Verona	NY 46	
CR 54A	3.25	5.23	CR 80 at the Sylvan Beach village line	Vienna and Haskins roads in Vienna	Old NY 49	
CR 55	6.11	9.83	NY 12 / NY 28 in Steuben	Pritchard and Fairchild roads	NY 365 in Remsen	
CR 56	4.64	7.47	NY 274 in Steuben	Steuben Valley Road	Barneveld village line in Trenton	
CR 57	4.32	6.95	CR 74	Starr Hill Road in Steuben	CR 53	
CR 58	8.08	13.00	CR 88 in Floyd	Koenig and Floyd Camroden roads	CR 53 in Western	
CR 59	2.30	3.70	NY 12 / NY 28	Dayton Road in Remsen	CR 72	
CR 60	6.01	9.67	CR 53 in Lee	Hawkins Corners and Elmer Hill roads	NY 46 in Rome	
CR 60A (1)	0.75	1.21	CR 50	Stoney Creek Road in Verona	Dead end at Erie Canal	
CR 60A (1)	0.11	0.18	Dead end at Erie Canal	Stoney Creek Road in Verona	Rome city line	
CR 60A (2)	1.67	2.69	CR 62	Sleepy Hollow Road in Lee	NY 26	
CR 61	9.64	15.51	Boonville village line in Boonville	Hawkinsville Road/Bear Creek Road	Adirondack Scenic Railroad in WoodgateForestport	
CR 62	7.17	11.54	NY 69 in Lee	Lee Valley and Thomas roads and West Thomas Street	Rome inner tax boundary	
CR 63	1.82	2.93	Buck Lake Road	Round Lake Road in Forestport	NY 28	
CR 64	1.72	2.77	CR 62	Thomas Road in Lee	CR 53	Includes Marsh Road west of Thomas Road
CR 65	1.97	3.17	Lewis County line (becomes CR 54)	West Leyden Road in Boonville	Boonville village line	
CR 66	4.85	7.81	Old NY 49 in Vienna	Herder and Blossvale roads	Main Street in Annsville	
CR 67	16.86	27.13	CR 53 in Lee	Point Rock and Ava roads	NY 294 in Ava	
CR 67A	9.85	15.85	CR 70 / CR 70A in Florence	Empeyville and Sheehan roads	CR 67 in Ava	
CR 68	16.93	27.25	NY 49 in Vienna	Mill, Stone Barn, Preston Hill, River, and Osceola roads	Lewis County line in Florence (becomes CR 78)	Discontinuous at Camden village line
CR 68A	2.22	3.57	CR 68	Mulholland Road in Vienna	NY 49	
CR 68B	0.11	0.18	CR 68	River Road Spur in Florence	Dead end	
CR 69	3.34	5.38	NY 13 in Vienna	McConnellsville Road	CR 66 in Annsville	
CR 70	11.74	18.89	Camden village line in Camden	Wolcott Hill, Thompson Corners–Florence, and Redfield roads	Oswego County line in Florence (becomes CR 27)	
CR 70A	6.87	11.06	NY 69 in Annsville	Taberg–Florence Road	CR 67A / CR 70 in Florence	Formerly NY 285
CR 71	8.70	14.00	Oswego County line (becomes CR 56)	Hillsboro Road in Camden	NY 13	
CR 71A	1.84	2.96	CR 71	Steam Mill Road in Camden	NY 69	
CR 71B	1.14	1.83	NY 69	Penny Mix Road in Camden	NY 13	
CR 72	9.00	14.48	CR 82 in Remsen	Commons, Bardwell Mills, O'Brien, and Woodhull roads	River Road in Forestport	
CR 72A	5.42	8.72	NY 920V in Trenton	James and Bardwell Mills roads	CR 72 in Remsen	
CR 73	4.91	7.90	CR 72	North Lake Road in Forestport	Herkimer County line (becomes CR 214)	
CR 74	17.61	28.34	NY 365 in Floyd	Floyd–Steuben, North Steuben, and Potato Hill roads	NY 12 in Boonville	Discontinuous between CR 53 and NY 274
CR 74A	1.49	2.40	Boonville village line	East Street in Boonville	Lewis County line (becomes CR 43)	
CR 75	10.44	16.80	NY 46 in Western	Buck Hill and Egypt roads	NY 12 / NY 28 in Boonville	
CR 76	7.24	11.65	NY 46 in Western	Webster Hill Road	CR 67 in Ava	
CR 77	1.47	2.37	CR 13 in Kirkland	Campus Road	CR 15A in Westmoreland	
CR 78	3.28	5.28	CR 18	Sulphur Springs Road in Paris	Oneida Street	
CR 79	1.99	3.20	Oneida County Airport	Airport Road in Whitestown	NY 69	
CR 79A	0.23	0.37	CR 79	Airline Street in Whitestown	CR 79B	
CR 79B	0.18	0.29	Dead end	Base Road in Whitestown	CR 79D	
CR 79C	0.19	0.31	CR 79	First Street in Whitestown	CR 79D	
CR 79D	0.20	0.32	CR 79C	Hangar Road in Whitestown	CR 79	
CR 80	0.40	0.64	NY 13	McClanthan Road in Vienna	CR 54A	
CR 81			CR 13	Stuhlman Road in Vernon	Vernon village line	Transferred to state on April 1, 1981; now part of NY 31
CR 82	3.88	6.24	NY 12 / NY 28 in Trenton	Old Route 12	NY 12 / NY 28 in Remsen	Former routing of NY 12 and NY 28; discontinuous at Remsen village limits
CR 83	5.85	9.41	NY 31 in Verona	Main Street and Old Oneida Road	NY 26 in Rome	Former routing of NY 365
CR 84	8.44	13.58	Camden village line in Camden	Florence Hill and Hayes road	CR 70 in Florence	
CR 85	2.72	4.38	CR 70	Skinner Settlement Road in Camden	CR 70A	
CR 86	2.61	4.20	NY 13	Poppleton Road in Verona	CR 54	
CR 87	1.98	3.19	CR 91	Mallory Road in Marcy	Trenton town line	
CR 88	6.51	10.48	NY 365 in Rome	River Road	NY 291 in Marcy	Former routing of NY 49
CR 88A	0.46	0.74	River Street (NY 922E)	Unnamed road in Marcy	CR 88	
CR 89	0.95	1.53	Dead end	Oneida, Church, Main, and Fox streets in Verona	NY 46	
CR 90			NY 233	Sutliff Road in Whitestown	CR 40	Former number; now part of CR 840
CR 91	7.37	11.86	Utica city line in Deerfield	Trenton Road	CR 35 in Trenton	Former routing of NY 12
CR 92	5.50	8.85	Utica city line	Walker Road in Deerfield	NY 8	Former routing of NY 8
CR 92A	0.47	0.76	NY 8	Brayton Road in Deerfield	Schrider Road	
CR 93	3.71	5.97	CR 47 in Rome	Rabbitt and Old Floyd roads	NY 365 in Floyd	Formerly NYSDOT reference route 819
CR 94	1.36	2.19	NY 31	Churton Road in Vernon	NY 5	Formerly part of NY 234
CR 840	6.61	10.64	NY 233	Sutliff, Coleman Mills, and Judd roads in Whitestown	NY 840 at CR 52 (segment 2)	

== See also ==
- County routes in New York
