= List of county routes in Madison County, New York =

County routes in Madison County, New York, are signed with the Manual on Uniform Traffic Control Devices-standard yellow-on-blue pentagon route marker.

== Routes 1–50 ==
Route	Length (mi)	Length (km)	From	Via	To	Notes
CR 1	6.87	11.06	Onondaga County line (becomes CR 53)	Bridgeport–Kirkville and North roads in Sullivan	Dead end at Oneida Lake	
CR 2	0.83	1.34	Onondaga County line (becomes CR 115)	Peck Road in Sullivan	CR 1 / CR 4	
CR 3	6.41	10.32	NY 5 / NY 13 in Chittenango	Lakeport Road	NY 31 in Sullivan	
CR 4	4.35	7.00	CR 1 / CR 2	Chestnut Ridge Road in Sullivan	CR 3	
CR 5	5.57	8.96	Maple Avenue in Canastota village	Main Street and North Main Street Road	NY 31 in Lenox	
CR 6	11.64	18.73	Onondaga County line in Sullivan (becomes CR 115)	Fyler and New Boston roads and New Boston Street	Taylor Avenue in Canastota	
CR 6A	0.65	1.05	CR 6	Perretta Drive in Lenox	CR 6	
CR 7	4.21	6.78	NY 13	Lewis Point Road in Lenox	NY 31	
CR 8	1.23	1.98	CR 5	Whitelaw Road in Lenox	CR 7	
CR 9	1.06	1.71	Onondaga County line (becomes CR 146)	Pompey Hollow Road in Cazenovia	Onondaga County line (becomes CR 146)	
CR 10 (1)	6.32	10.17	CR 5 in Lenox	Pine Ridge Road and North Court Street	NY 5 / CR 54 in Wampsville	
CR 10 (2)	0.14	0.23	CR 10 (segment 1)	North Court Street Spur in Lenox	Dead end at CSX railroad tracks	
CR 11	1.89	3.04	NY 13	Oneida Valley Road in Lenox	NY 316	
CR 12	2.01	3.23	NY 13 in Canastota	Roberts Street	CR 10 in Lenox	
CR 13 (1)	3.20	5.15	CR 76 in Oneida	Schoolheimer and Kelley roads	NY 316 in Oneida	
CR 13 (2)	0.13	0.21	CR 13 (segment 1)	Old Schoolheimer Road in Oneida	Dead end at New York State Thruway	
CR 13 (3)	0.71	1.14	Dead end at New York State Thruway	Cobb Street in Oneida	Oneida inner tax boundary	
CR 14	2.03	3.27	CR 10 in Wampsville	Elm Street	Oneida inner tax boundary in Oneida	
CR 15	3.26	5.25	NY 92	West Lake and North Lake roads in Cazenovia	CR 17	
CR 16	4.27	6.87	CR 23 in Sullivan	Cottons Road	CR 25 / CR 92 in Lincoln	
CR 17	7.38	11.88	US 20 / NY 13 in Cazenovia village	Forman Street and E Lake Road	NY 173 in Sullivan	
CR 18	3.38	5.44	CR 29 in Lincoln	Fairview Avenue	NY 46 in Oneida	
CR 19	2.88	4.63	NY 13	Falls Road in Fenner	CR 21	
CR 20	3.22	5.18	CR 23	Ingalls Corners Road in Lincoln	CR 25	
CR 21	4.63	7.45	NY 13 in Chittenango	Madison Street and Perryville Road	CR 23 in Fenner	
CR 22	0.34	0.55	CR 19	Dwyer Road in Sullivan	CR 21	
CR 23	10.75	17.30	US 20 in Nelson	Nelson, Perryville, and Quarry roads	NY 5 / NY 13 in Sullivan	
CR 24	1.59	2.56	Onondaga County line	Peth Road in Cazenovia	CR 17	
CR 25	12.98	20.89	US 20 in Nelson	Pleasant Valley and Oxbow Road	NY 5 / NY 13 in Lenox	
CR 26	2.73	4.39	NY 13 in Cazenovia	Bingley Road	CR 23 in Fenner	
CR 27	2.19	3.52	CR 92	Timmerman Road in Lincoln	CR 54	
CR 28	8.82	14.19	US 20 in Cazenovia village	Fenner Street and Fenner and Cody roads	CR 25 in Smithfield	
CR 29	6.58	10.59	CR 32 in Smithfield	Creek Road	CR 54 in Lincoln	
CR 30	4.48	7.21	CR 32 in Smithfield	Williams Road and Peterboro Street	CR 35 in Munnsville	
CR 31	3.05	4.91	CR 32 in Smithfield	Peterboro Road	CR 34 in Stockbridge	
CR 32	7.13	11.47	CR 25 in Smithfield	Peterboro and Stockbrdge Falls roads	CR 49 in Stockbridge	
CR 33	6.55	10.54	NY 46 / CR 38 in Stockbridge	Middle Road	Oneida County line in Oneida	
CR 34	5.73	9.22	CR 29 in Lincoln	Burleson and Peterboro roads	Oneida County line in Oneida (becomes CR 25)	
CR 35	2.86	4.60	NY 46 in Munnsville	Park and Canada streets and Valley Mills Road	CR 33 / CR 36 in Stockbridge	
CR 36	0.84	1.35	NY 46	Greene Road in Stockbridge	CR 33 / CR 35	
CR 37	6.67	10.73	CR 43 in Madison	Cole Street	CR 40 in Stockbridge	
CR 38	0.54	0.87	NY 46 / CR 33	Haslauer Road in Stockbridge	CR 35	
CR 39	1.63	2.62	CR 37	Stratford Street in Madison	Oneida County line	
CR 40	2.67	4.30	CR 35 in Munnsville	East Hill Road	Oneida County line in Stockbridge (becomes CR 11)	
CR 41	2.57	4.14	US 20 / CR 83 in Madison village	North Street and Solsville and Augusta roads	Oneida County line in Madison (becomes CR 10)	
CR 42	3.68	5.92	CR 45	Rocks, Cramer, and Lynch roads in Eaton	NY 46	
CR 43	5.72	9.21	US 20 / CR 81	Canal and Valley roads in Madison	Oneida County line	
CR 44	1.73	2.78	NY 46	Union Street, Cramer Avenue, and Chapel Street in Oneida	CR 51	
CR 45	2.92	4.70	US 20 in Morrisville	North Street and Davis Corners Road	CR 47 in Smithfield	
CR 46	2.50	4.02	Onondaga County line (becomes CR 125)	Delphi Road in Cazenovia	CR 65	
CR 47	4.35	7.00	CR 49 in Eaton	Fearon Road	CR 101 in Smithfield	
CR 48	1.40	2.25	CR 65	Juddville Road in Cazenovia	CR 50	
CR 49	6.07	9.77	NY 46 in Eaton	Pratts Road	NY 46 in Stockbridge	
CR 50	6.91	11.12	CR 65 in Cazenovia	Number Nine, Ballina, Constatine Bridge, and Hardscrabble roads	CR 67 in Nelson	

== Routes 51 and up ==
Route	Length (mi)	Length (km)	From	Via	To	Notes
CR 51	0.54	0.87	Oneida County line (becomes CR 25)	Kenwood Avenue in Oneida	Oneida County line	
CR 52	11.05	17.78	NY 13 / NY 80 in Cazenovia	Damon and Eaton Brook roads	NY 26 in Eaton	
CR 53	2.48	3.99	Chenango County line in DeRuyter (becomes CR 12)	Lincklaen Road and Cemetery Street	NY 13 in DeRuyter village	
CR 54	8.11	13.05	CR 32 in Smithfield	Buyea Road and South Court Street	NY 5 / CR 10 in Wampsville	
CR 55 (1)	2.25	3.62	NY 13	Middle Lake Road in DeRuyter	CR 98	
CR 55 (2)	0.51	0.82	Onondaga County line (becomes CR 126)	West Lake Road in DeRuyter	Onondaga County line (becomes CR 12)	
CR 56	0.98	1.58	CR 57	Hunt Road in DeRuyter	NY 13	
CR 57	4.60	7.40	NY 13 in DeRuyter	East Lake and Reservoir roads	NY 80 / CR 109 in Cazenovia	
CR 58	5.98	9.62	NY 13 in DeRuyter village	Albany Street and Crumb Hill Road	Chenango County line in Georgetown (becomes CR 16)	
CR 59	0.50	0.80	CR 57 in DeRuyter	Dam Road	Onondaga County line in Cazenovia (becomes CR 74)	
CR 60	5.20	8.37	NY 13 / NY 80 in DeRuyter	Dugway Road	CR 67 in Nelson	
CR 61	1.23	1.98	Chenango County line (becomes CR 13)	Mariposa Road in DeRuyter	CR 58	
CR 62	9.89	15.92	NY 26 in Georgetown	Lebanon Road and Nower Road	NY 12B in Hamilton	
CR 64	8.10	13.04	NY 26 / NY 80 in Georgetown	East Hill and South Lebanon roads	Chenango County line in Lebanon (becomes CR 22)	
CR 65	5.97	9.61	NY 13 / NY 80 in Cazenovia	East Road and Chenango and Mill streets	US 20 / NY 13 in Cazenovia village	
CR 66	4.88	7.85	CR 62	Reservoir and Armstrong roads in Lebanon	CR 75	
CR 67	9.51	15.30	NY 26 in Georgetown	Erieville Road	US 20 in Nelson	
CR 68	3.42	5.50	CR 83	Center Road in Madison	US 20	
CR 69 (1)	3.05	4.91	Chenango County line	Upham Road in Georgetown	CR 64	
CR 69 (2)	1.05	1.69	NY 26 / NY 80	Mill Road in Georgetown	CR 69 (segment 1)	
CR 70	3.44	5.54	Hamilton village line	Gorton Road and Hamilton Street in Hamilton	CR 89	
CR 71	8.79	14.15	Chenango County line in Lebanon	Campbell and Bradley Brook roads	NY 26 in Eaton	
CR 72	2.03	3.27	CR 70	Hamilton Street in Hamilton	CR 89	
CR 73	8.38	13.49	Chenango County line in Lebanon	River Road	NY 26 in Eaton	
CR 74	4.28	6.89	CR 89 in Hamilton	Larkin Road	CR 95 in Brookfield	
CR 75	1.83	2.95	CR 73 in Lebanon	Randallsville Road	Hamilton village line in Hamilton	
CR 76	5.05	8.13	NY 13 in Canastota	Canal Street and Canal Road	NY 316 in Oneida	
CR 77	0.74	1.19	NY 12B	Middleport Road in Lebanon	CR 75	
CR 78	6.40	10.30	Oneida County line (becomes CR 6)	Mason and Swamp roads, Main Street, and Ouleout Road in Brookfield	CR 80	
CR 79	0.52	0.84	NY 46	Fargo Road in Eaton	US 20	Entire length overlaps with NY 26
CR 80	8.81	14.18	CR 95	Skaneateles Turnpike and Ouleout Road in Brookfield	NY 8	
CR 81	1.66	2.67	NY 46 in Eaton	Canal Road	US 20 / CR 43 in Madison	
CR 82	0.51	0.82	CR 99	Bliven Road in Brookfield	Oneida County line	
CR 83	5.34	8.59	Hamilton village line in Madison	Lake Morraine Road and South Street	US 20 / CR 41 in Madison village	
CR 84	0.59	0.95	NY 8	Forks Road in Brookfield	Otsego County line (becomes CR 18B)	
CR 85	2.80	4.51	Hamilton village line	Smith Road in Eaton	NY 26	
CR 86	5.39	8.67	CR 67 in Nelson	Tuscarora Road	CR 52 in Eaton	
CR 87	2.70	4.35	Hamilton village line	East Lake Road in Madison	CR 83	
CR 88	2.22	3.57	CR 89	Willey Road in Hamilton	CR 95	
CR 89 (1)	7.68	12.36	CR 89A	Earlville, Poolville, and Green roads in Hamilton	NY 12	
CR 89 (2)	0.14	0.23	NY 12	Green Road Spur in Hamilton	NY 12	
CR 89A	1.06	1.71	NY 12B in Earlville	East Main Street	Borden Road in Hamilton	
CR 90 (1)	0.86	1.38	CR 88	Tackabury Road in Hamilton	CR 90 (segment 2)	
CR 90 (2)	0.23	0.37	NY 12	Tackabury Road Spur in Hamilton	NY 12	
CR 91	5.79	9.32	CR 89 in Hamilton	Quarterline Road	CR 68 in Madison	
CR 92	2.60	4.18	CR 16 / CR 25	Clockville Road in Lincoln	CR 29	
CR 93	1.94	3.12	Onondaga County line in Sullivan (becomes CR 132)	Salt Springs Road	NY 5 in Chittenango	
CR 94	0.11	0.18	NY 8	Welsh Road in Brookfield	Otsego County line (becomes CR 18C)	
CR 95	7.62	12.26	NY 12 in Hamilton	South Hamilton and Moscow roads	CR 80 in Brookfield	
CR 96	0.21	0.34	NY 8	Center Street in Brookfield	Otsego County line (becomes CR 19)	
CR 97	1.49	2.40	CR 54 in Lincoln	Upper Lenox Avenue	NY 5 / NY 365A in Oneida	
CR 98	0.84	1.35	Onondaga County line	South Lake Road in DeRuyter	CR 57	
CR 99	10.02	16.13	NY 8	Beaver Creek Road in Brookfield	Oneida County line (becomes CR 6A)	
CR 100	3.32	5.34	CR 29 in Lincoln	Mount Hope Avenue	NY 46 in Oneida	
CR 101	5.41	8.71	US 20 in Morrisville	Cedar Street and Swamp Road	CR 32 in Smithfield	
CR 102	1.62	2.61	NY 12	Albro Road in Hamilton	NY 12	
CR 103	2.02	3.25	NY 26	Eagleville Road in Eaton	CR 105	
CR 104	0.37	0.60	US 20 in Morrisville	Christian Hill Road	US 20 in Eaton	
CR 105	4.12	6.63	NY 26 in Eaton	Eaton Road and Eaton Street	US 20 in Morrisville	
CR 106	1.08	1.74	CR 105	Hart and South roads in Eaton	Morrisville village line	
CR 107	1.61	2.59	CR 62	Rodman Road in Lebanon	CR 73	
CR 108	0.84	1.35	CR 89	Cranston Road in Hamilton	NY 12	
CR 109	1.96	3.15	Onondaga County line	Fabius Road in Cazenovia	NY 13	Entire length overlaps with NY 80

== See also ==
- County routes in New York
