= New York State Route 46 =

State highway in central New York, US

New York State Route 46
- Map of central New York with NY 46 highlighted in red

Route information
- Maintained by NYSDOT and the city of Oneida
- Length: 59.33 mi (95.48 km)
- Existed: mid-1920s–present

Major junctions
- South end: NY 12B in Eaton
- US 20 in Eaton; NY 5 near Oneida; NY 26 / NY 49 / NY 69 in Rome
- North end: NY 12D in Boonville

Location
- Country: United States
- State: New York
- Counties: Madison, Oneida

Highway system
- New York Highways; Interstate; US; State; Reference; Parkways
← NY 45	→ NY 46A

New York State Route 46 (NY 46) is a state highway in Central New York in the United States. It extends from NY 12B in the Madison County town of Eaton to NY 12D in the Oneida County village of Boonville. NY 46 passes through the cities of Oneida and Rome.

== Route description ==
=== Eaton to Rome ===
NY 46 begins at an intersection with NY 12B in the town of Eaton (in the hamlet of Pecksport). NY 46 proceeds northwest through Eaton, crossing a junction with County Route 81 (CR 81 or Canal Road). Just north of the junction, the route crosses over the abandoned canal, immediately entering the hamlet of Pine Woods, where it runs along Leland Pond into an intersection with NY 26 (Fargo Road). Less than a mile northwest of NY 26, NY 46 reaches a junction with US 20. Paralleling the creek that was Leland Pond, NY 46 and US 20 run concurrently for a short distance, crossing through the center of Pine Woods. Near the center of the hamlet, NY 46 turns off to the northeast.

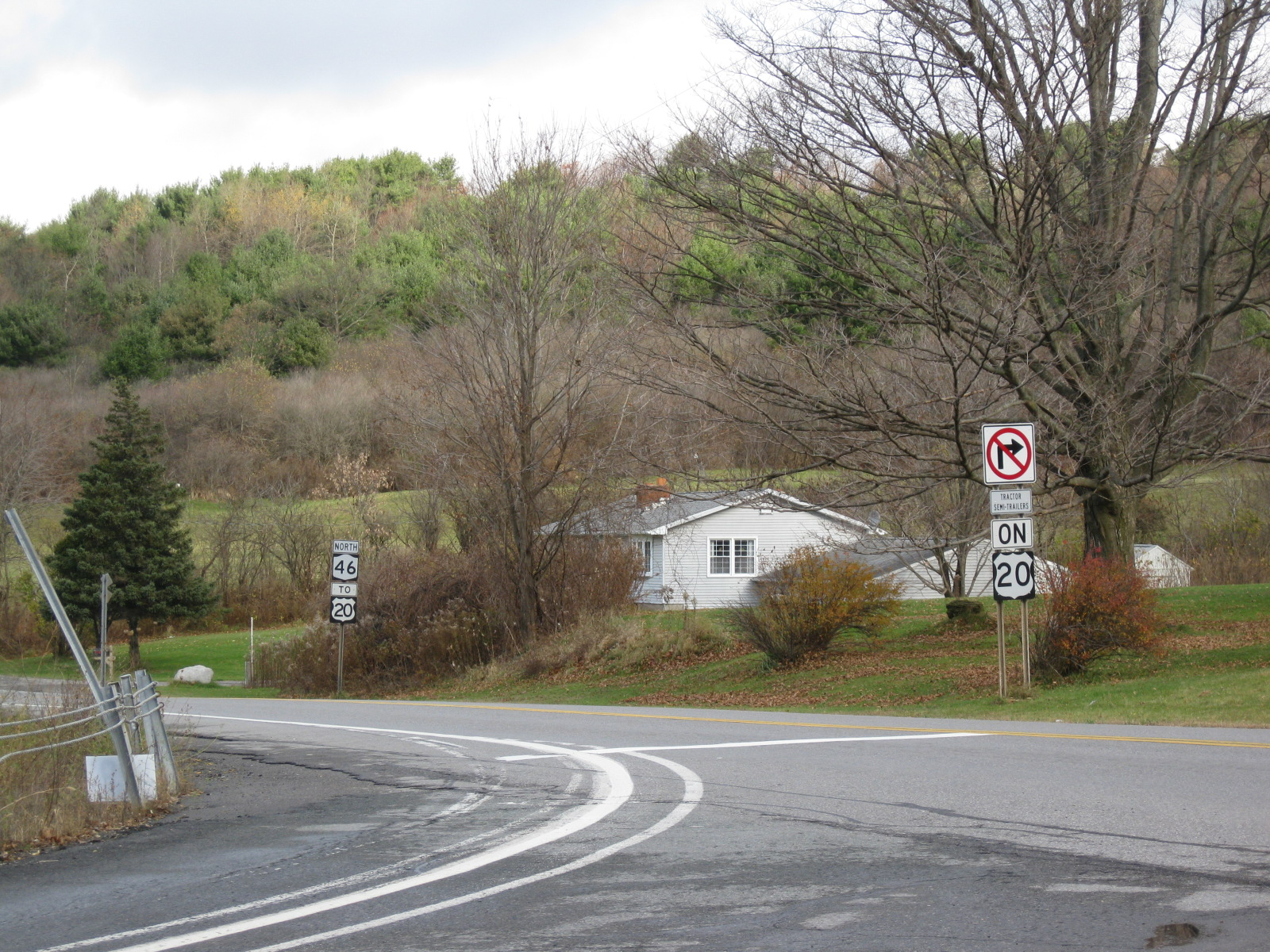
NY 46 north of NY 26 in the town of Eaton

Passing a junction with CR 46 (Pratts Road), NY 46 continues north through Eaton, gaining the moniker of Bear Path Road. North of Pine Woods, the surroundings for NY 46 are predominantly rural, crossing a junction with the eastern terminus of CR 42 (Lynch Road). A distance north of CR 42, the route crosses into Stockbridge. Just after crossing the northern terminus of CR 49, NY 46 reaches the village of Munnsville and changes names to South Main Street as it enters the center of the village. At Williams Avenue, the route changes to North Main Street, passing multiple residences and soon crosses back into the town of Stockbridge and paralleling Oneida Creek.

Now known as West Road, NY 46 continues into the hamlet of Stockbridge and makes a dart west at the junction with CR 38 (Haslauer Road). After turning northwest once again, NY 46 continues for a distance through the farms of Madison County until reaching CR 34 (Peterboro Road), where the route crosses into the city of Oneida. Now known as Glenwood Avenue, the route crosses through a large rural section through the Oneida National Indian Reservation and into the hamlet of Scribner Corners. After passing Glenwood Cemetery, NY 46 turns northward enters a large commercial sector of Oneida in front of a junction with NY 5 (Genesee Street).

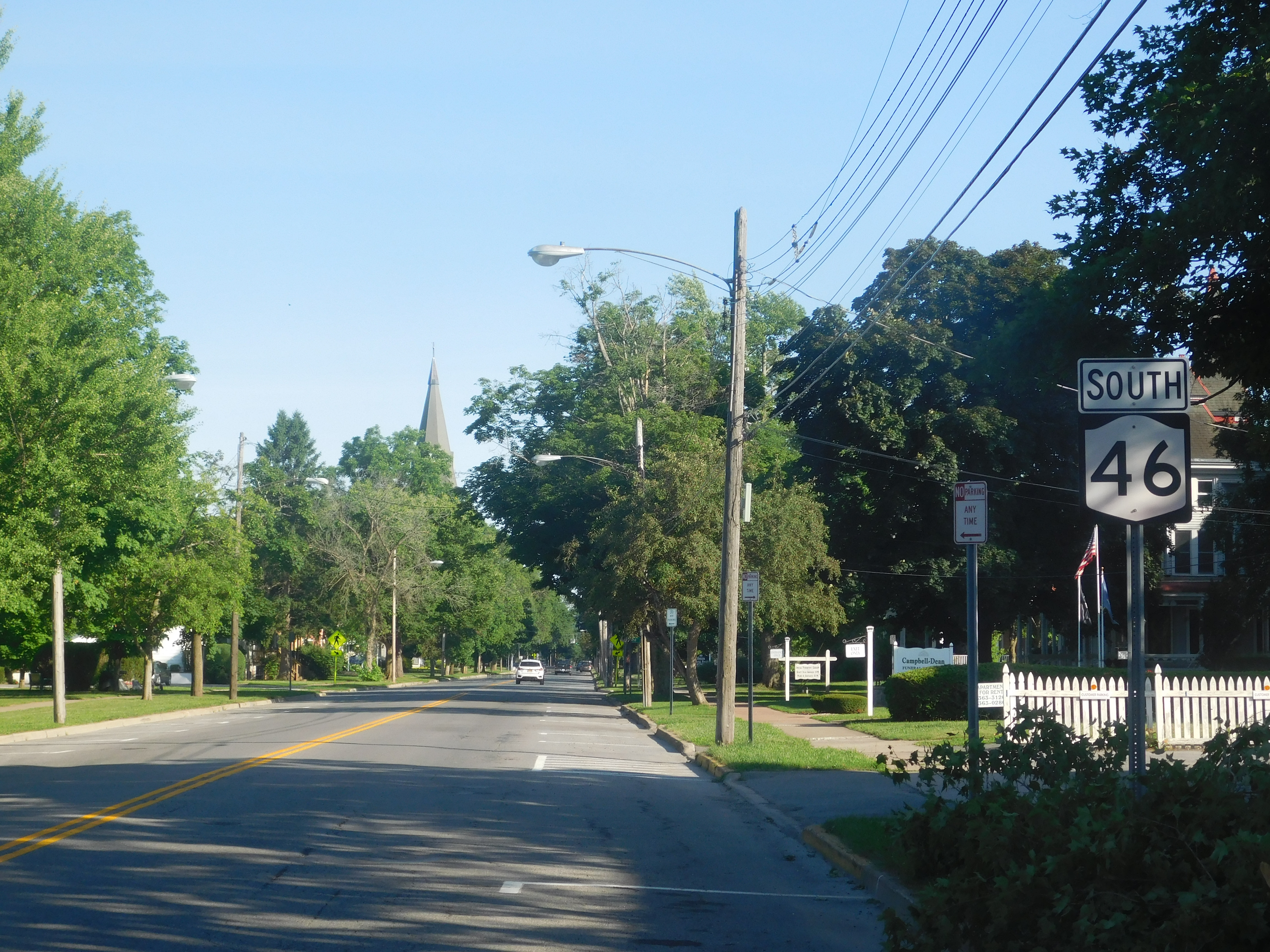
NY 46 south in Oneida

Continuing further into Oneida, NY 46 changes names at NY 5 to Main Street, becomes city-maintained, crossing east of Allen Park and enters a residential section of Oneida, passing blocks of homes. Approaching the center of the city, NY 46 reaches a junction with NY 365A (Lenox Avenue) and becomes the main north–south city street through Oneida. Just north of East Railroad Street, NY 46 turns northwest, becoming North Main Street as it crosses through the northern reaches of the city. The route passes west of Veterans Memorial Park and the Northside Shopping Center before crossing over tracks owned by CSX Transportation. The route becomes state maintained once more past Furnace Avenue. Less than a mile north of the tracks, NY 46 crosses under, but does not interchange with, the New York State Thruway (I-90).

After passing the southern terminus of NY 316 (Lake Road), NY 46 turns north and crosses over Oneida Creek into Oneida County and the town of Verona. Immediately in the hamlet of Durhamville, NY 46 begins paralleling a section of the former Erie Canal through the community, retaining the moniker of Main Street until a junction with CR 89. Running across the canal from Old Erie Canal State Park, NY 46 runs into the hamlet of State Bridge, where it turns northeast into a junction with NY 31. NY 46 continues north from NY 31 along the canal, crossing northeast through the town of Verona, which remains predominantly rural.

Crossing into the hamlet of Higginsville, where it junctions with the southern terminus of Higginsville Road (CR 50A), NY 46 continues along the former canal, crossing the hamlet of Stacy Basin before turning eastward towards New London. Just west of New London, NY 46 turns northeast a junction with New London Road and crosses the current Erie Canal east of Lock 21. After a short stint north of the canal, NY 46 reaches a junction with NY 49. Running along Rome–New London Road, NY 46 and NY 49 become concurrent through the town of Verona, crossing north of the hamlet of East Verona. Passing south of the Fort Rickey Children's Discovery Zone, the routes cross over Wood Creek and enter the city of Rome.

=== Rome to Boonville ===
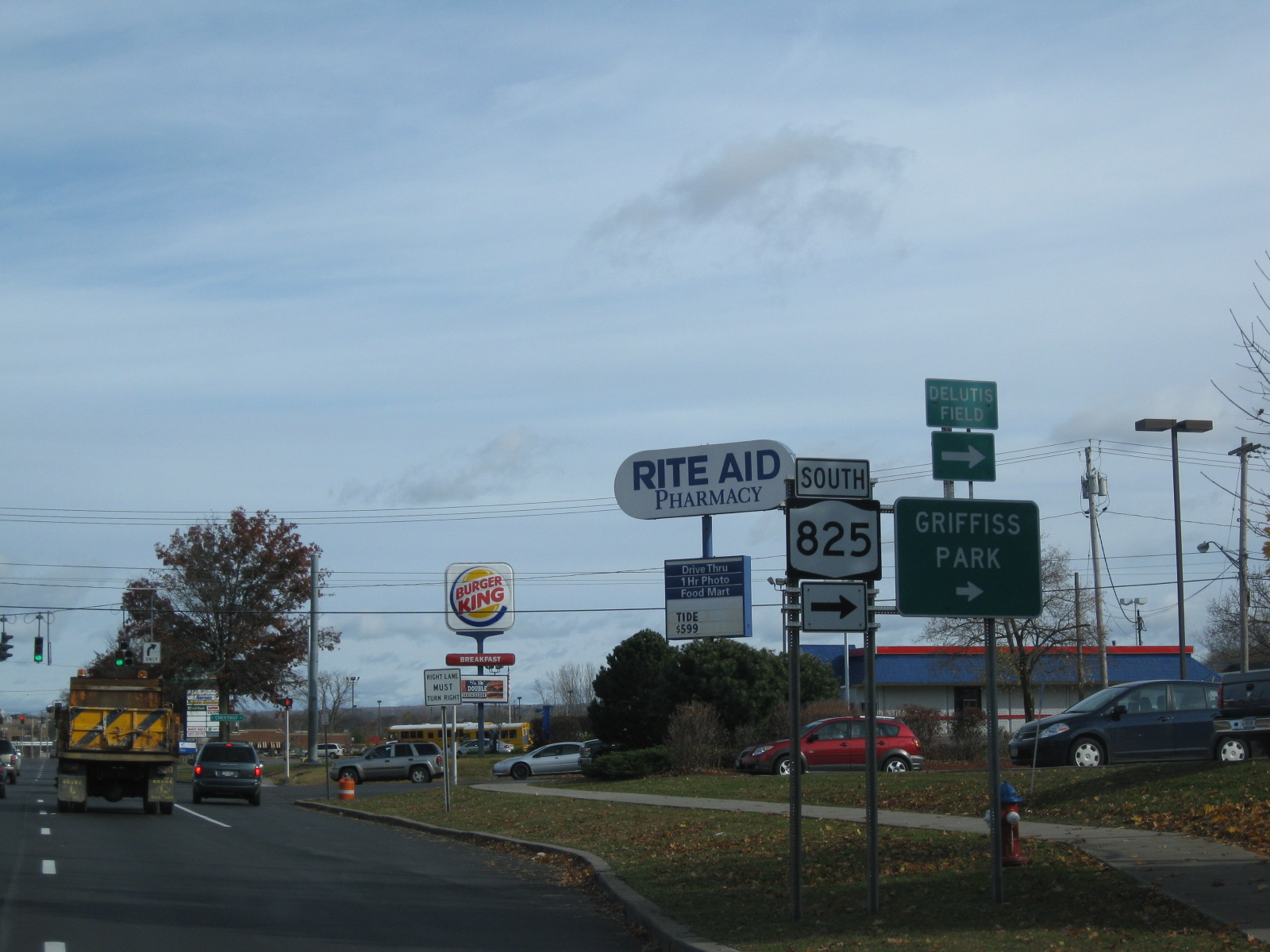
NY 46 northbound at NY 825 in Rome

After crossing into the city of Rome, NY 46 and NY 49 enter the hamlet of Seifert Corners and begin winding eastward along Rome–New London Road along Wood Creek. The routes soon cross into the city of Rome's inner district, where they reach a junction with NY 69 (Erie Boulevard West). NY 69 joins the concurrency with NY 46 and NY 49, running southeast along Erie Boulevard West through a large commercial strip in Rome. After the fork with West Dominick Street, the routes bend into the residential section of Rome, running along the southern extremities of the city, passing the Civic Center and soon entering a large interchange with NY 26. At this junction, NY 49 and NY 69 continue south along NY 26 south while NY 46 turns north along NY 26 north on Black River Boulevard North.

Passing in front of the Fort Stanwix National Monument, NY 46 and NY 26 continue northeast after NY 49 turns off at East Dominick Street. At the junction with East Bloomfield Street, NY 26 turns onto West Bloomfield while NY 46 continues northeast on Black River Boulevard, becoming a large commercial street on the eastern side of Rome. The route passes Franklyns Field in the Colonial Park section before reaching a junction with the northern terminus of NY 825 (East Chestnut Street) in the Mohawk Gardens section. Passing another long set of strip malls and other businesses, NY 46 turns northwest along the Mohawk River and crosses a junction with Madison Street, where it changes to Ridge Mills Road. A short distance north, the route leaves the city of Rome's inner district and drops the moniker for Rome–Westernville Road.

Just after leaving the inner district of the city of Rome, NY 46 turns northeast at a junction with Elmer Hill Road (CR 60) along parallels the Mohawk River past a local fish hatchery. Crossing the Mohawk, the route soon enters the hamlet of Canterbury Hill and begins running along the eastern shore of the Delta Reservoir. Along one of the branches of the reservoir, NY 46 leaves the city of Rome for the town of Western and passes the entrance to Delta Lake State Park. Continuing northeast along Delta Reservoir, NY 46 soon reaches the hamlet of Westernville, crossing a junction with Gifford Hill Road (CR 53). The route passes Western Town Park and continues out of Westernville and away from the reservoir.

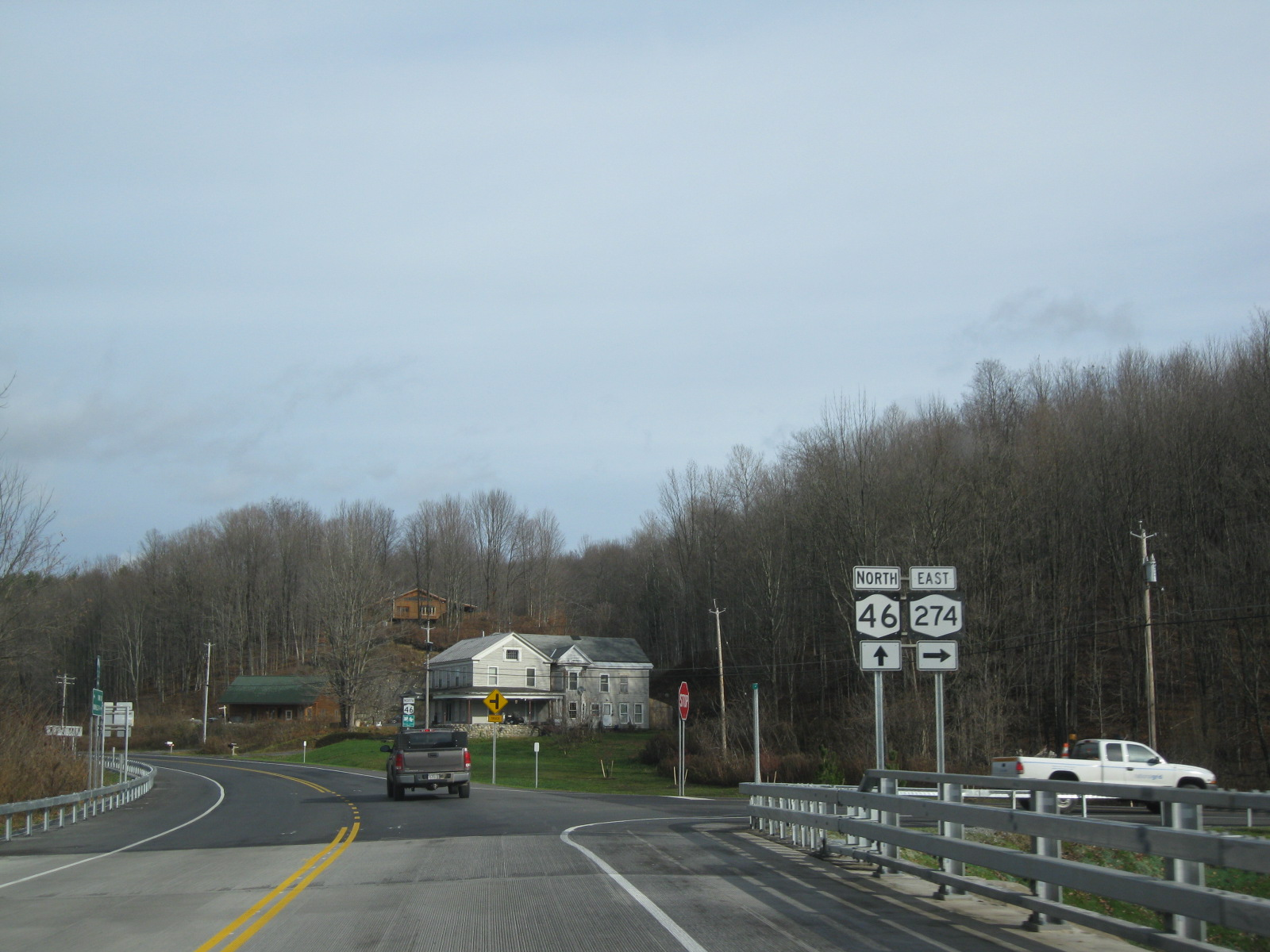
NY 46 northbound at NY 274 in Western

Paralleling the Mohawk River from a distance, NY 46 soon reaches a junction with the northern terminus of NY 274. At NY 274, NY 46 turns northward near the abandoned Black River Canal and crosses through the hamlet of Frenchville before reaching North Western. Running between the river and Buck Hill, NY 46 begins a northwest route through the town of Western, but changing directions at the hamlet of Hillside, where a connector to Western Hill Road (CR 76) is provided. Now running northward, NY 46 returns to the rural settings north of North Western and soon reaches the rural hamlet of Dunn Brook. Just north of Dunn Brook, the route crosses the town line from Western into the town of Ava. The stretch of NY 46 in Ava is very short and after one curve, the route crosses into the town of Boonville.

Now in Boonville, NY 46 becomes a two-lane woods road through town, soon entering Pixley Falls State Park. Within the park, the route turns northeast and passes the main entrance gate near the locale of Hurlbutville. A distance northeast of Hurlbutville, the route leaves Pixley Falls State Park and continues into Jackson Hill State Forest, for which NY 46 runs along the base of. Winding northward through Boonville, NY 46 remains rural before turning northwest at a fork in the road. Just north of Jackson Hill Road, the route begins to become residential as it reaches the village of Boonville. At the junction with Academy Street, the route gains the moniker of Post Street and becomes a two-lane residential street at the southwestern end of the village. Crossing a junction with the eastern terminus of NY 294, NY 46 soon reaches a junction with NY 12D in the northern end of Boonville, marking the northern terminus of NY 46.

== History ==
NY 46 was assigned in the mid-1920s to an alignment extending from Oriskany Falls to Boonville via Rome. The route followed what is now NY 26 south of Rome (via James Street) and its modern alignment north of the city. Around the same time, the segment of modern NY 46 between the Verona hamlet of New London and Rome was designated as part of NY 49 while the portion between NY 5 in Oneida and Oneida Creek north of the city became part of NY 31. In the 1930 renumbering of state highways in New York, NY 31 was realigned to bypass Oneida to the north while its former alignment into the city became NY 316. NY 46 was also realigned at this time to follow its modern routing between Bouckville and Rome. The realigned NY 46 overlapped with NY 49 from Verona to Rome and with NY 316 along NY 31's former routing. The overlap with NY 316 was eliminated by 1970.

== NY 46A ==
New York State Route 46A
- Location: Floyd–Western
- Existed: 1930–early 1950s

NY 46A was a spur of NY 46 in Oneida County. The route began at NY 49 south of Floyd and passed through Holland Patent and Steuben before ending at NY 46 in the Western hamlet of Frenchville. The route was assigned as part of the 1930 renumbering of state highways in New York and removed in the early 1950s.

== Major intersections ==
County	Location	mi	km	Destinations	Notes
Madison	Eaton	0.00	0.00	NY 12B – Hamilton, Madison, Colgate University	Southern terminus
Madison	Eaton	0.92	1.48	NY 26 (Fargo Road) – Georgetown, Madison	
Madison	Eaton	1.40	2.25	US 20 east – Madison	Eastern terminus of US 20 / NY 46 overlap
Madison	Eaton	1.61	2.59	US 20 west – Morrisville, SUNY Morrisville	Hamlet of Pine Woods; western terminus of US 20 / NY 46 overlap
Madison	Oneida	15.59	25.09	NY 5 (Genesee Street) to I-90 / New York Thruway – Wampsville, Sherrill	Access to hospital via NY 5 west; access to I-90 via NY 5 east
Madison	Oneida	16.71	26.89	NY 365A (Lenox Avenue) to NY 365 / I-90 / New York Thruway	Access to Thruway via NY 365A and NY 365
Madison	Oneida	18.39	29.60	NY 316 north (Lake Road) – Oneida Valley	Southern terminus of NY 316
Oneida	Verona	20.86	33.57	NY 31 to I-90 / New York Thruway – Bridgeport, Verona	Hamlet of State Bridge
Oneida	Verona	27.25	43.85	NY 49 west – Vienna	Hamlet of New London; western terminus of NY 46 / NY 49 overlap
Oneida	Rome	32.46	52.24	NY 69 west (Erie Boulevard West) – Camden	Western terminus of NY 46 / NY 69 overlap
Oneida	Rome	34.79	55.99	NY 26 south (Erie Boulevard East) / NY 49 east / NY 69 east	Eastern terminus of NY 46 / NY 49 and NY 46 / NY 69 overlaps; southern terminus of NY 26 / NY 46 overlap
Oneida	Rome	35.38	56.94	NY 26 north (Bloomfield Street)	Northern terminus of NY 26 / NY 46 overlap
Oneida	Rome	36.47	58.69	NY 825 south (Chestnut Street) – Griffiss Business Park, MVCC	Northern terminus of NY 825
Oneida	Western	45.13	72.63	NY 274 south – Holland Patent	Hamlet of Frenchville; northern terminus of NY 274
Oneida	Village of Boonville	59.22	95.31	NY 294 west (Ford Street) – West Leyden	Eastern terminus of NY 294
Oneida	Village of Boonville	59.33	95.48	NY 12D (Post Street) – Turin	Northern terminus
1.000 mi = 1.609 km; 1.000 km = 0.621 mi: Concurrency terminus
