= New York State Route 285 =

Former highway in New York

New York State Route 285
- Map of northwestern Oneida County with NY 285 highlighted in red

Route information
- Maintained by NYSDOT
- Length: 6.87 mi (11.06 km)
- Existed: 1930–November 4, 1988

Major junctions
- South end: NY 69 in Annsville
- North end: CR 67A / CR 70 in Florence

Location
- Country: United States
- State: New York
- Counties: Oneida

Highway system
- New York Highways; Interstate; US; State; Reference; Parkways
← NY 284	→ NY 286

New York State Route 285 (NY 285) was a state highway in Oneida County, New York, in the United States. The southern terminus of the 6.87-mile (11.06 km) route was at an intersection with NY 69 west of the hamlet of Taberg in the town of Annsville. Its northern terminus was in the community of Thompson Corners, where it ended at a junction with County Route 67A (CR 67A) and CR 70. NY 285 was little more than a connector between NY 69 and Thompson Corners, as it did not pass through any other areas of interest.

NY 285 initially extended from Taberg to the hamlet of Florence when it was assigned as part of the 1930 renumbering of state highways in New York. It was truncated to Thompson Corners c. 1935, but extended slightly in the 1960s when NY 69 was realigned to bypass Taberg. Ownership and maintenance of NY 285 was transferred to Oneida County on September 1, 1988, and the NY 285 designation was removed just over two months later. The route is now County Route 70A.

== Route description ==
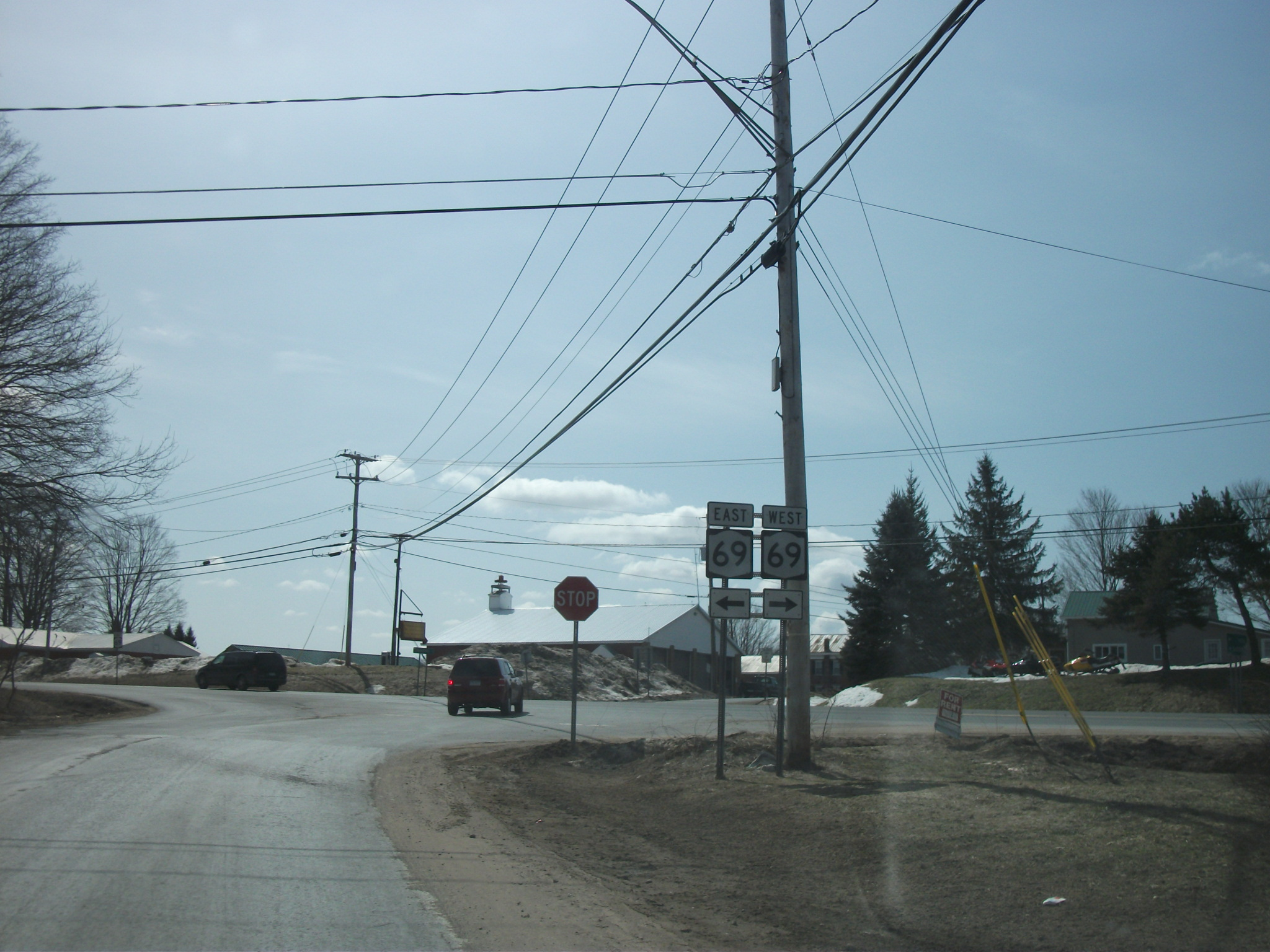
Former NY 285 at the junction with NY 69 in Taberg

NY 285 began at an intersection with NY 69 southwest of the hamlet of Taberg in the town of Annsville. The route headed northward, intersecting with Main Street, which connected NY 285 to Taberg. Here, NY 285 turned to the northwest and became Taberg–Florence Road. Just outside Taberg, the route passed Saint Patrick's Cemetery, as well as the remains of an old Protestant cemetery situated directly across NY 285 from it. As it continued northwestward through a rural portion of Oneida County, NY 285 passed a junkyard near the intersection with Pond Hill Road. Past an intersection with Carlisle Road, NY 285 entered a state reforestation area. As such, the surrounding landscape became mostly forested areas. Near the center of the reforestation area, the highway intersected with Skinner Settlement Road (CR 85). After passing over Corkin Hill, NY 285 headed downhill into the town of Florence.

After crossing into Florence, NY 285 remained in the reforestation area, and continued towards Thompson Corners on a linear, northwesterly routing. It passed Greely Cemetery, then continued to Thompson Corners, a very small community in southeastern Florence. NY 285 terminated here at an intersection with Empeyville Road (CR 67A) and Wolcott Hill Road (CR 70). CR 70 turned northwest at this junction to follow NY 285's right-of-way to the hamlet of Florence and eventually to the Oneida County line.

== History ==
NY 285 was assigned as part of the 1930 renumbering of state highways in New York to a highway connecting NY 69 (Main Street) in Taberg to the isolated hamlet of Florence in the town of the same name via Thompson Corners. The route was truncated southeastward to Thompson Corners c. 1935. In the early 1960s, NY 69 was rerouted to follow a new purpose-built highway that bypassed most of Taberg to the south. Most of NY 69's original alignment through the hamlet was transferred to the town of Annsville; however, its former western approach into Taberg along Taberg Road was realigned to meet the bypass and became a short extension of NY 285.

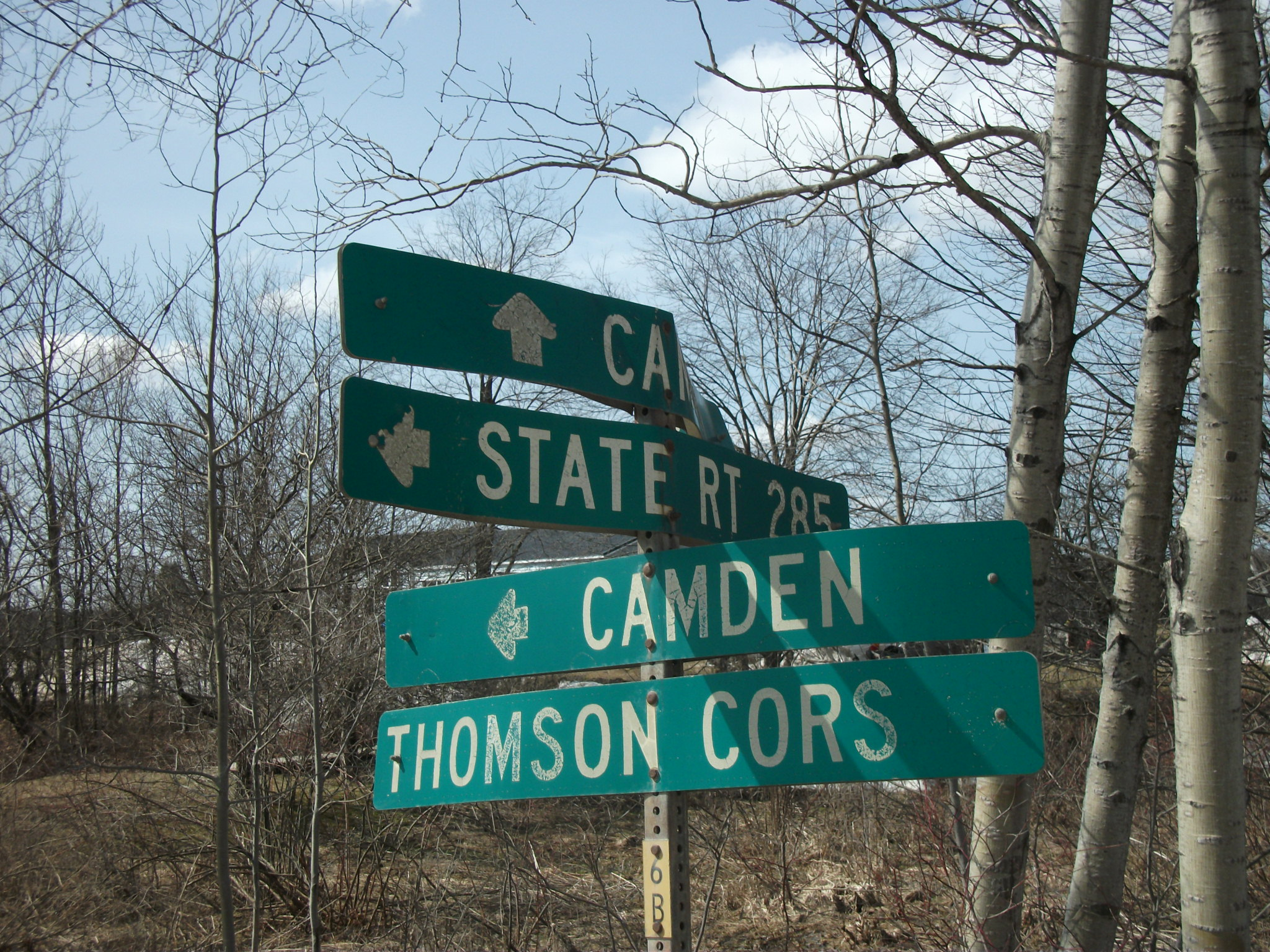
Signage for NY 285 is still posted on Wolcott Hill Road (CR 70) in Camden even though the designation was eliminated in 1988.

On September 1, 1988, ownership and maintenance of NY 285 was transferred from the state of New York to Oneida County. The portion of the exchange relating to NY 285 was described in New York State Highway Law as follows, with annotations in brackets:

... to transfer to the county of Oneida for future maintenance as part of the county highway system in Oneida and to issue official orders of abandonment of those portions of highway described as follows: "beginning at a point on or near state highway five thousand one hundred thirty-nine [NY 69], west of the hamlet of Taberg, thence running generally northwesterly to a county highway in or near the hamlet of Thompson Corners.

— New York State Legislature, New York State Highway Law § 341

In return, the state of New York assumed maintenance over a portion of River Street (CR 32) that connected NY 69 in Oriskany to NY 49 in Marcy. This highway became NY 922E, an unsigned reference route. Meanwhile, the NY 285 designation remained in place until November 4, 1988, when it was officially removed from the highway. The former routing of NY 285 became CR 70A, a spur of the pre-existing CR 70.

== Major intersections ==
The entire route was in Oneida County.

Location	mi	km	Destinations	Notes
Annsville	0.00	0.00	NY 69	Hamlet of Taberg
Florence	6.87	11.06	CR 67A (Empeyville Road) / CR 70 (Wolcott Hill Road)	Hamlet of Thompson Corners
1.000 mi = 1.609 km; 1.000 km = 0.621 mi

== See also ==
- List of county routes in Oneida County, New York
