= Marcy (CDP), New York =

Marcy, New York
- Census-designated place
- Location within New York Location within the United States
- Coordinates: 43°8′17″N 75°16′33″W
- Country: United States
- State: New York
- County: Oneida
- Town: Marcy

Area
  - Total: 1.83 sq mi (4.74 km^{2})
  - Land: 1.72 sq mi (4.45 km^{2})
  - Water: 0.11 sq mi (0.29 km^{2})
- Elevation: 439 ft (134 m)

Population (2020)
  - Total: 650
  - Density: 378.3/sq mi (146.07/km^{2})
- Time zone: UTC-5 (Eastern (EST))
  - Summer (DST): UTC-4 (EDT)
- ZIP Code: 13403
- Area codes: 315/680
- FIPS code: 36-45524
- GNIS feature ID: 2806949

Marcy is an unincorporated community and census-designated place (CDP) in the town of Marcy, Oneida County, New York, United States. It was first listed as a CDP prior to the 2020 census.

The CDP is in eastern Oneida County, in the southern part of the town of Marcy. It is 5 miles (8 km) northwest of Utica and 11 miles (18 km) southeast of Rome. The hamlet of Maynard is in the eastern part of the CDP. Interstate 90, the New York Thruway, passes through Marcy, but with no direct access. New York State Route 49, the Utica–Rome Expressway, runs the length of the community, with access from one exit in the center of the CDP, as well as exits at the eastern and western ends of the CDP. The Erie Canal forms the southern border of the community.

== Demographics ==
Historical population
Census	Pop.	Note	%±
2020	650		—
U.S. Decennial Census

== Education ==
It is in the Whitesboro Central School District. Marcy Elementary School is in the CDP. The district's secondary schools are Whitesboro Middle School and Whitesboro High School.
