= New York State Route 825 =

State highway in Oneida County, New York, US

New York State Route 825
- Griffiss Veterans' Memorial Parkway
- Map of central Oneida County with NY 825 highlighted in red

Route information
- Maintained by the city of Rome
- Length: 2.59 mi (4.17 km)
- Existed: 2002–present

Major junctions
- South end: NY 49 in Rome
- North end: NY 46 in Rome

Location
- Country: United States
- State: New York
- Counties: Oneida

Highway system
- New York Highways; Interstate; US; State; Reference; Parkways
| ← NY 812 | → NY 840 |

New York State Route 825 (NY 825) is a state highway in Oneida County, New York, in the United States. It extends for 2.59 miles (4.17 km) in a generally northwest–southeast direction, connecting the former Griffiss Air Force Base to the Utica–Rome Expressway (NY 49) and downtown Rome. The highway's southern terminus is at an interchange with NY 49 east of downtown Rome, and its northern terminus is at an intersection with NY 46 just north of downtown. NY 825 was assigned in 2002 and is ceremoniously named the Griffiss Veterans' Memorial Parkway.

== Route description ==
NY 825 begins at a trumpet interchange with the Utica–Rome Expressway (NY 49) east of downtown Rome. The route heads northward, crossing over NY 365 about 150 yards (137 m) from NY 49. No direct connection exists between NY 365 and NY 825; however, Shady Grove Trail, a local street located just south of the Griffiss Business and Technology Park limits, provides access between the two roads. The highway continues north into the park, where it serves as the primary north–south roadway through the area. Roughly 1 mile (1.6 km) north of NY 49, NY 825 meets Geiger and Ellsworth Roads at a roundabout and continues northward toward Griffiss International Airport.

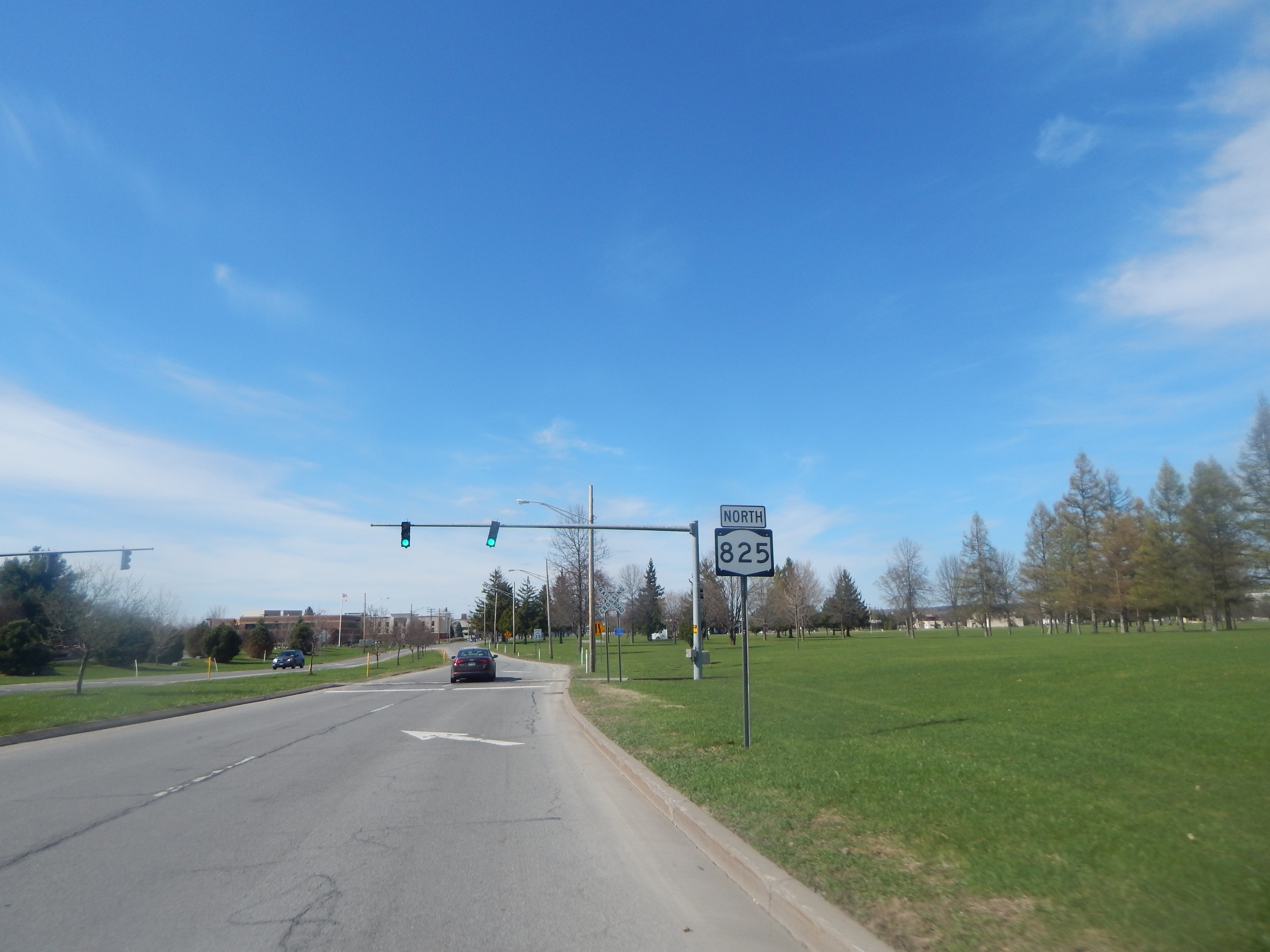
NY 825 at the at-grade rail crossing near Hangar Road in 2015, now continues as four-lane

Then at another roundabout it meets Hangar Road, a local street providing direct access to the airport, NY 825 turns to the northwest, following Mohawk Drive toward the western extent of the former Griffiss Air Force Base grounds. The road comes to a junction with Bell Road, the last street that NY 825 meets within the business park. Past Bell Road, the route curves the northwest and exits the park as it crosses over the Mohawk River and enters a more densely developed area of Rome. NY 825, now named East Chestnut Street, continues onward for three blocks into a commercialized area north of downtown Rome, where it ends at a junction with Black River Boulevard (NY 46). All of NY 825 is maintained by the city of Rome.

== History ==
Construction on the four-lane roadway that became NY 825 began on November 20, 2001, with a groundbreaking ceremony. The southernmost 1 mile (1.6 km) of the $8.5 million highway was completed by the following October, at which time the roadway was signed as NY 825. By 2004, the route was extended northward along two-lane surface streets to intersect NY 46 north of downtown Rome. Long-term plans for the route called for the two-lane segments of NY 825 to be widened to four lanes. The section of NY 825 from Bell Road to NY 46 was widened by February 2009, leaving just the 1-mile (1.6 km) of the route from the roundabout with Geiger and Ellsworth Roads northwest to Bell Road to be expanded.

On July 3, 2007, all of NY 825 was officially designated the Griffiss Veterans' Memorial Parkway after legislation proposing the name was signed into law by Governor Eliot Spitzer. Signage displaying the ceremonial name was unveiled as part of a dedication ceremony held on November 14, 2007.

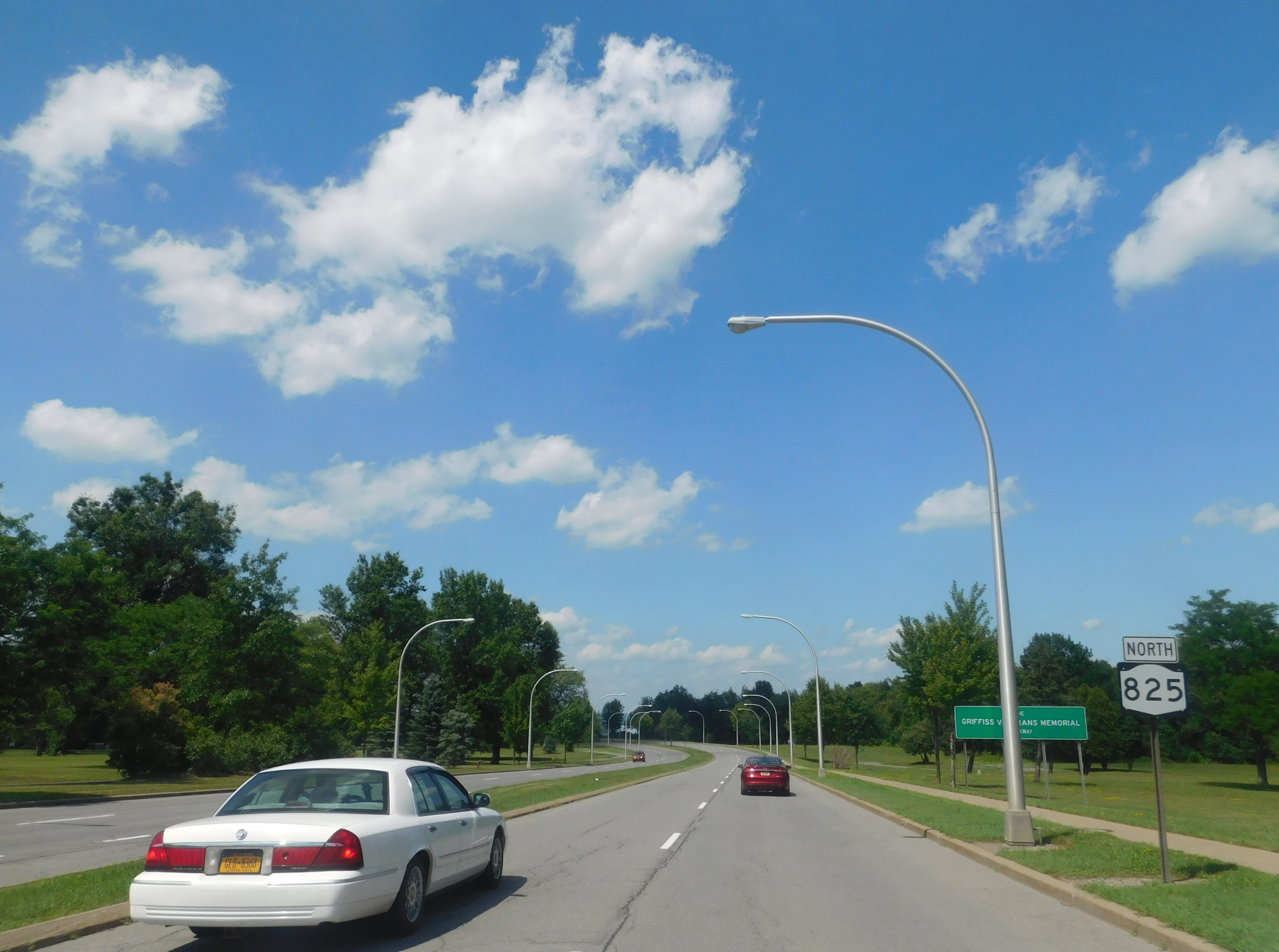
NY 825 northbound in Griffiss

In February 2009, the Griffiss Local Development Corporation (GLDC) hired an engineering firm to complete the design work needed to begin work on widening the final two-lane section of NY 825 to four lanes. The company hoped that completing the project's design would make the project eligible for federal stimulus funding. The New York State Department of Transportation (NYS DOT) had completed 40% of the necessary design work; however, it lacked the funds needed to complete the plans and build the highway. As a result, GLDC saw hiring an outside firm to finish the project layout and receive federal stimulus funding as the most feasible way to make the project a reality. The remaining design work was estimated to cost between $400,000 and $500,000 while the actual construction cost was set at approximately $7 million.

In April 2015, $10.5M was included in the NYS DOT budget to renovate the parkway's final one-mile long, two-lane section into four lanes. GLDC hired an engineering firm to update the 2009 design plans. The project plan includes two roundabouts, one at the Floyd Avenue and Brooks Road intersection and one at the Hangar Road intersection. The budget also includes funding to construct a multi-use recreational trail and tie it into the Mohawk River/Erie Canal Trail System. An $8.85M contract was awarded and construction began in August 2016 with completion scheduled for October 2018. On November 7, 2017, the newly built section of the parkway was opened to traffic although work is continuing on final paving, lighting, and rip out of the old alignment to allow for construction of the adjacent recreational trail.

== Major intersections ==
The entire route is in Rome, Oneida County.

| mi | km | Destinations | Notes |
|---|---|---|---|
| 0.00 | 0.00 | NY 49 (Utica–Rome Expressway) to New York Thruway (I-90 Toll) / NY 365 west – Utica, Oneida | Interchange; southern terminus |
| | | To NY 365 | Access via King Pin Lane |
| 2.59 | 4.17 | NY 46 (Black River Boulevard) | Northern terminus |
1.000 mi = 1.609 km; 1.000 km = 0.621 mi
