= New York State Route 274 =

State highway in Oneida County, New York, US

New York State Route 274
- Map of Oneida County in central New York with NY 274 highlighted in red

Route information
- Maintained by NYSDOT
- Length: 10.44 mi (16.80 km)
- Existed: early 1950s–present

Major junctions
- South end: NY 365 in Holland Patent
- North end: NY 46 in Western

Location
- Country: United States
- State: New York
- Counties: Oneida

Highway system
- New York Highways; Interstate; US; State; Reference; Parkways
← NY 273	→ NY 275
← NY 46	NY 46A	→ NY 47

New York State Route 274 (NY 274) is a 10.44-mile (16.80 km) state highway located entirely in Oneida County, New York, in the United States. The route begins at an intersection with NY 365 in the village of Holland Patent and heads north and west for 5 miles (8 km) in each direction to a junction with NY 46 at the hamlet of Frenchville in the town of Western. A two-lane highway its entire length, much of NY 274 is narrow and winding. The northwesternmost 2 miles (3.2 km) of the highway are particularly narrow and curved, running alongside a tributary of the Mohawk River. NY 274 was originally designated as part of New York State Route 46A, an alternate route of NY 46 between Rome and Western, in 1930 before gaining its current designation in the early 1950s.

== Route description ==
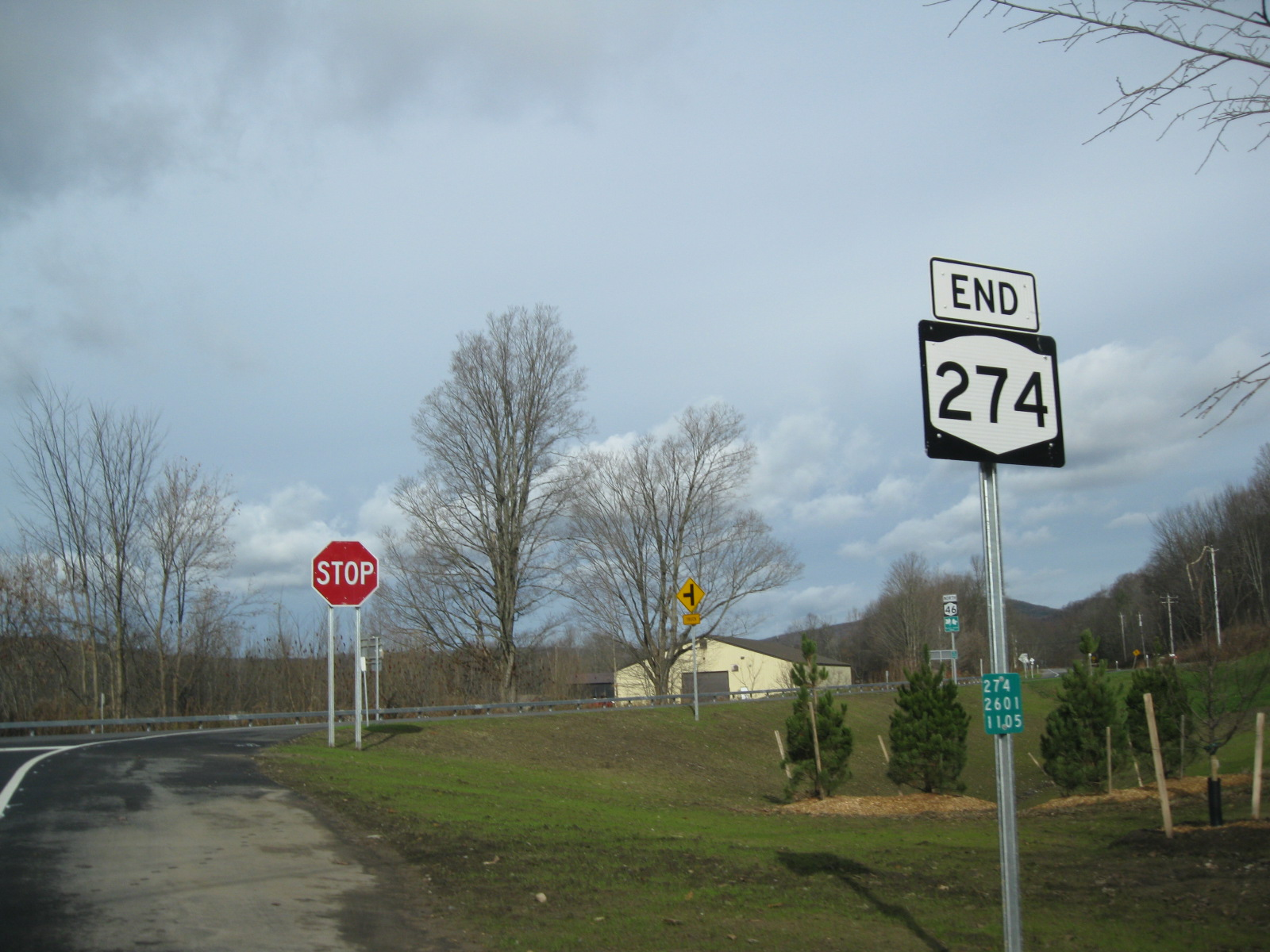
NY 274 northbound approaching the terminus with NY 46 in Western

NY 274 begins at an intersection with NY 365 (Main Street) in the village of Holland Patent, situated north of Ninemile Creek. The highway heads north on the two-lane Steuben Street, passing by a long row of homes located along the eastern bank of Willow Creek, a tributary of Ninemile Creek. Outside of the village, the homes taper off as the route enters a hilly, wooded area of central Oneida County. Willow Creek leaves NY 274 a short distance later, heading northwestward toward its source in the adjacent town of Floyd. The road continues northward on a slightly northwestern track, climbing in elevation and crossing into Floyd. Here, the trees give way to rolling fields as the route heads through the small hamlet of East Floyd. Over the next 3 miles (5 km), the route winds its way northward across open terrain and a stretch of marshland before making a sharp turn to the west in the town of Steuben.

The route continues on, traveling across more open fields as it proceeds through the sparsely populated hamlet of Steuben, home to the town's center of government. NY 274 eventually enters the town of Western, where it crosses over Big Brook in a two-home hamlet of the same name. At this point, the road heads west into a narrow, winding valley formed by two large hills flanking both sides of the creek. The route descends in elevation as it follows Big Brook and Wells Creek into a larger valley surrounding the Mohawk River. NY 274 immediately enters the hamlet of Frenchville, where it ends at a junction with NY 46. Just northwest of the junction is the abandoned Black River Canal, which NY 46 parallels as it heads through Western.

== History ==
New York State Route 46A
- Location: Floyd–Western
- Existed: 1930–early 1950s

The origins of NY 274 date back to the 1930 renumbering of state highways in New York, when an alternate route of NY 46 between Rome and the Western hamlet of Frenchville was designated as NY 46A. The route began in downtown Rome and followed Floyd Avenue, and Brooks, Middle, and Stearns Roads east to Floyd, where it continued on to Holland Patent by way of what is now NY 365. At Holland Patent, NY 46A turned north and followed the entirety of modern NY 274 to rejoin NY 46 in Frenchville. NY 46A was rerouted by 1932 to follow Old Floyd Road between Rome and Floyd. Within a year, the portion of NY 46A between Rome and Holland Patent became concurrent with NY 365, a new route that connected NY 5 in Oneida to U.S. Route 9 in Plattsburgh.

In the early 1940s, NY 46A was reconfigured to bypass Griffiss Air Force Base to the south. It now began at the junction of James and Dominick Streets in downtown Rome and overlapped NY 49 and NY 365 east to Koenig Road, where NY 46A and NY 365 left NY 49 and proceeded north on Koenig Road to Floyd. In the late 1940s, NY 365 was rerouted to follow a new highway (New Floyd Road) between Rome and Floyd; however, NY 46A remained on River and Koenig Roads until the early 1950s, when it was routed onto New Floyd Road as well. The NY 46A designation was removed by 1954, at which time the portion of the route north of Holland Patent became NY 274.

== Major intersections ==
The entire route is in Oneida County.

Location	mi	km	Destinations	Notes
Holland Patent	0.00	0.00	NY 365 (Main Street)	Southern terminus
Western	10.44	16.80	NY 46 (Dunn Brook Road) – Rome, Boonville	Northern terminus; hamlet of Frenchville
1.000 mi = 1.609 km; 1.000 km = 0.621 mi
