= New York State Route 316 =

State highway in Madison County, New York, US

New York State Route 316
- Lake Road
- Map of Madison and Oneida counties with NY 316 highlighted in red

Route information
- Maintained by NYSDOT
- Length: 4.03 mi (6.49 km)
- Existed: 1930–present

Major junctions
- South end: NY 46 in Oneida
- North end: NY 31 in Lenox

Location
- Country: United States
- State: New York
- Counties: Madison

Highway system
- New York Highways; Interstate; US; State; Reference; Parkways
← NY 315	→ NY 317

New York State Route 316 (NY 316) is a state highway in Madison County, New York, in the United States. It extends for 4.03 miles (6.49 km) in a northwest–southeast direction from an intersection with NY 46 in the city of Oneida to a junction with NY 31 in the hamlet of Oneida Valley, located in the town of Lenox. NY 316 serves as a connector between Oneida Lake and the city of Oneida, and it parallels Oneida Creek for its entire length. The route was assigned as part of the 1930 renumbering of state highways in New York, following what had previously been part of NY 31 during the 1920s.

== Route description ==
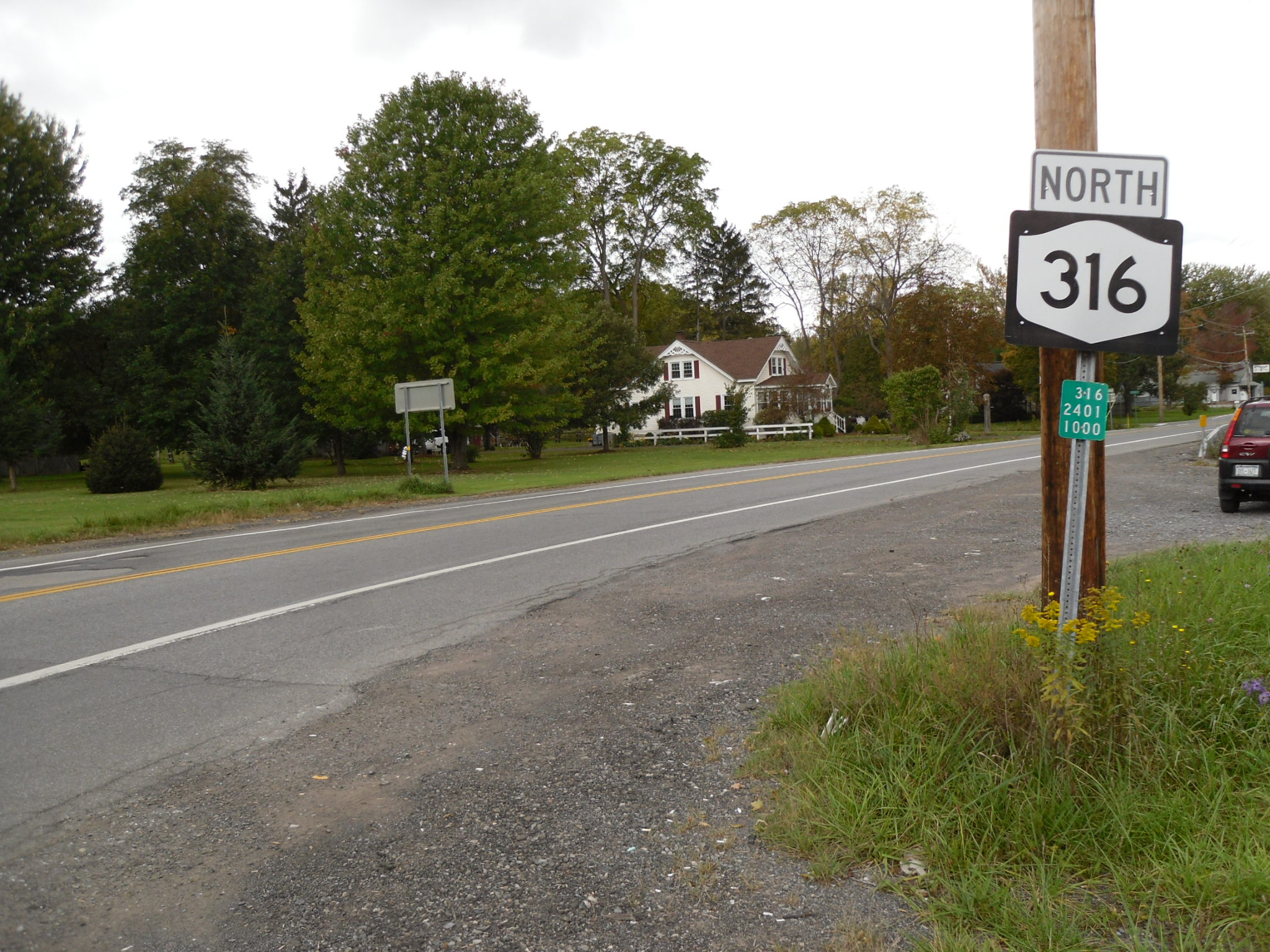
NY 316 heading northbound from its terminus at NY 46 in Oneida

NY 316 begins at an intersection with NY 46 in the outer reaches of the city of Oneida. The road heads to the northwest as the two-lane Lake Road, immediately passing through the linear Old Erie Canal State Historic Park before meeting County Route 76 (CR 76, named Canal Street) at a junction just outside the park limits. From CR 76, NY 316 runs past a handful of isolated homes and farms as it parallels Oneida Creek through the rural, northern section of the city. It eventually crosses into the town of Lenox, where it passes to the east of Kanon Valley Country Club a short distance from the town line. The town line also marks a change in the route's surroundings as the scattered homes give way to undeveloped open fields. NY 316 continues along the western edge of the creek, connecting to CR 11 (Oneida Valley Road) prior to entering the hamlet of Oneida Valley. Here, NY 316 ends at a junction with NY 31 roughly 1 mile (1.6 km) southeast of Oneida Lake.

== History ==
When NY 31 was assigned in the mid-1920s, it initially served the city of Oneida instead of bypassing it to the north as it does today. NY 31 turned southeast at the hamlet of Oneida Valley, following what is now NY 316 and NY 46 into downtown Oneida, where it ended at NY 5. In the 1930 renumbering of state highways in New York, NY 31 was realigned to follow its modern alignment east to Verona while its former alignment into Oneida was redesignated as NY 316. The route originally extended southward into downtown Oneida by way of an overlap with NY 46; however, the concurrency was eliminated by 1970.

== Major intersections ==
The entire route is in Madison County.

Location	mi	km	Destinations	Notes
Oneida	0.00	0.00	NY 46 – Durhamville, Oneida	Southern terminus
Lenox	4.03	6.49	NY 31 – Bridgeport, Verona	Northern terminus; hamlet of Oneida Valley
1.000 mi = 1.609 km; 1.000 km = 0.621 mi
