= Oneida Valley, New York =

- Hamlet
- Location within the state of New York
- Coordinates: 43°09′16″N 75°43′17″W
- Country: United States
- State: New York
- County: Madison
- Town: Lenox
- Elevation: 390 ft (119 m)
- Time zone: UTC-5 (Eastern (EST))
  - Summer (DST): UTC-4 (EDT)
- Area codes: 315 / 680

Oneida Valley is a hamlet in the Town of Lenox in Madison County, New York. It is located east of South Bay at the corner of New York State Route 31 (NY 31) and NY 316.
