= New York State Route 49 =

State highway in central New York, US

New York State Route 49
- NY 49 highlighted in red

Route information
- Maintained by NYSDOT
- Length: 64.13 mi (103.21 km)
- Existed: mid-1920s–present

Major junctions
- West end: NY 3 in Volney
- US 11 in Central Square; I-81 in Central Square; NY 13 in Vienna; NY 26 / NY 46 / NY 69 in Rome
- East end: I-790 / NY 5 / NY 8 / NY 12 in Utica

Location
- Country: United States
- State: New York
- Counties: Oswego, Oneida

Highway system
- New York Highways; Interstate; US; State; Reference; Parkways
← NY 48	→ NY 50

New York State Route 49 (NY 49) is an east–west state highway in central New York in the United States. It runs for just over 64 miles (103 km) from an intersection with NY 3 in the town of Volney (east of Fulton) in Oswego County, New York to an interchange with Interstate 790 (I-790), NY 5, NY 8 and NY 12 in the city of Utica in Oneida County. The route follows a generally northwest–southeast alignment between the two points, passing along the north shore of Oneida Lake and directly serving the city of Rome. As NY 49 heads east, it connects to several highways of regional importance, such as I-81 in the village of Central Square and NY 13 in the town of Vienna. Most of NY 49 is a two-lane surface road; however, the section between Rome and Utica is a freeway known as the Utica–Rome Expressway.

When it was originally assigned in the 1920s, NY 49 began at Central Square and ended at Rome. It was extended to roughly its current length in 1930, replacing NY 76 west of Marcy and utilizing previously unnumbered highways west of Central Square and east of Marcy. The section of NY 49 between Rome and Utica originally followed a surface road alongside the Mohawk River; however, it was rerouted onto the Utica–Rome Expressway as sections of the road opened to traffic. The first segment of the freeway was finished in 1960; the final piece was completed in 2003.

== Route description ==
=== West of Rome ===
NY 49 begins at an intersection with NY 3 in Volney. The route heads eastward, intersecting with NY 264 just outside Pennellville. The route crosses some local and county roads before entering Central Square, where it intersects with U.S. Route 11 (US 11) in the village center. It is not long after that Route 49 meets I-81 at exit 32. Route 49 leaves Central Square and heads southeast toward both Constantia and the Oneida Lake shoreline.

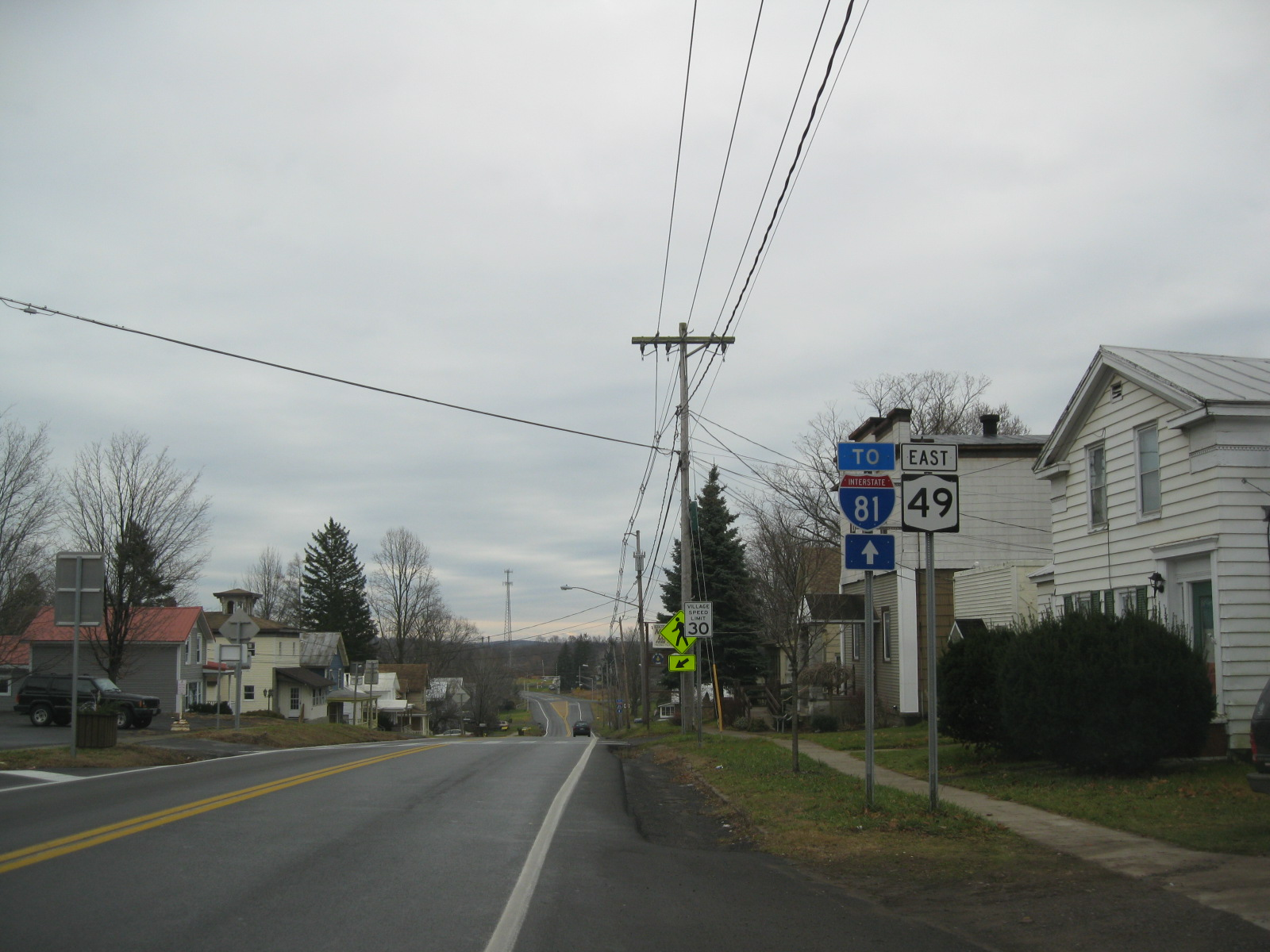
NY 49 eastbound in Central Square

East of the hamlet of Constantia, the highway begins to parallel the north shore of Oneida Lake. As the lakeside roadway, NY 49 provides access to both Bernhards Bay and Cleveland, two communities situated on the northern edge of the lake, before crossing into Oneida County and intersecting with NY 13 at the northeast corner of Oneida Lake in the town of Vienna. Here, NY 13 joins NY 49, overlapping the route to the hamlet of Vienna. While NY 13 heads north toward Camden, NY 49 continues eastward, loosely paralleling Fish Creek and the Erie Canal as it heads through rural Oneida County.

Midway between the hamlet of Vienna and downtown Rome, NY 49 crosses over Fish Creek and enters the westernmost portion of Rome. Unlike eastern Rome, home to the downtown district, western Rome is largely rural and undeveloped, as evidenced by the Rome Sand Plains located along the northern edge of NY 49. After 2.5 miles (4.0 km) of rural surroundings, the route passes out of Rome and into Verona upon traversing Wood Creek. The road continues south to the community of New London, where it intersects and joins NY 46 on the north bank of the Erie Canal.

Routes 49 and 46 head to the northeast, separating from the canal as it reenters Rome. Northwest of downtown, the routes are joined by NY 69 as they enter downtown on Erie Boulevard. At Black River Boulevard, Route 46 turns off; however, NY 26 turns onto Erie Boulevard, taking the place of NY 46 in the three-route concurrency. Together, Routes 26, 49 and 69 head south to a directional T interchange with NY 365, the first exit on the Utica–Rome Expressway. While NY 26 leaves to the west, NY 49 and NY 69 head east, embarking on an overlap with NY 365.

=== Utica–Rome Expressway ===
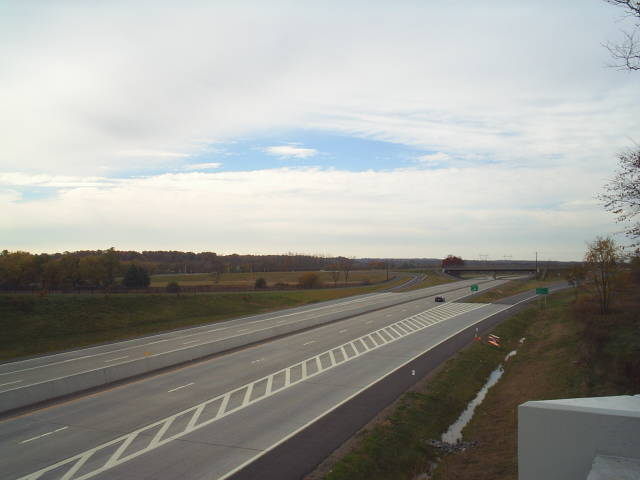
Looking west at the interchange between NY 49 and NY 291 in Marcy

At the first interchange east of the directional T junction, the expressway meets NY 233 as NY 69 exits to follow Rome–Oriskany Road to Utica. NY 49 and NY 365 continue on, turning northward to pass over the Mohawk River, the CSX Transportation Rome yard, and the Erie Canal in quick succession near the eastern edge of downtown Rome. Shortly over passing over the canal, NY 365 exits the expressway as well, leaving only NY 49 on the roadway. As the expressway curves back to the east, it crosses a railroad spur leading to the former Griffiss Air Force Base at-grade, a rare occurrence on limited-access highways. Route 49 then meets NY 825, the vehicular southern entrance to the ex-base, by way of an interchange before leaving the Rome limits.

As the expressway continues southeast through the towns of Floyd and Marcy toward Utica, it parallels both the Erie Canal, located due south of the roadway, and the Mohawk River, situated between the canal and the CSX Transportation mainline. In Marcy, NY 49 has an exit for River Street (NY 922E), a connector between the expressway and Oriskany, and another for NY 291 near the hamlet of Marcy. Farther east, the freeway meets Cavanaugh Road (NY 922A) by way of a parclo interchange.

Just east of Cavanaugh Road, the median of the expressway widens as it heads toward the New York State Thruway (I-90). At the Thruway, the eastbound lanes of NY 49 cross over I-90 while the westbound lanes do not, creating an unusual situation in that its westbound lanes run parallel to the Thruway to the latter's north, with the eastbound lanes to the south. North of downtown Utica, NY 49 encounters Edic Road. The expressway officially enters Utica shortly afterward, where Route 49 terminates at a complex interchange between itself, NY 5, NY 8, NY 12, and I-790. Although NY 49 ends, the expressway continues for an additional 1 mile (1.6 km) to Leland Avenue as NY 5.

== History ==
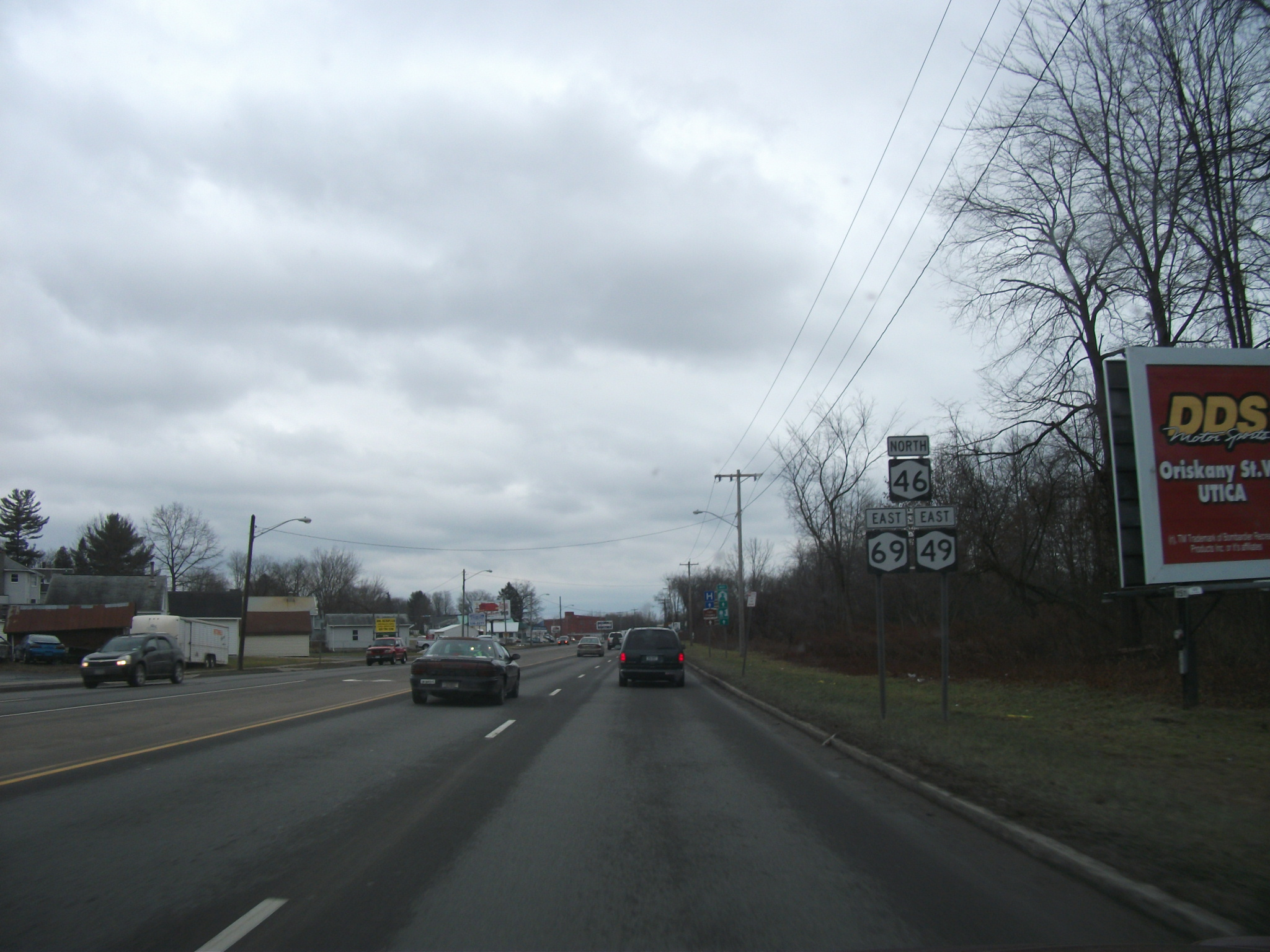
NY 46 north and NY 49 and NY 69 east in Rome

When NY 49 was assigned in the mid-1920s, it began at NY 2 (now US 11) in Central Square and ended at NY 11 (modern NY 69) in Rome. At the time, the portion of River Road from Rome to Marcy (at what is now NY 291) was part of NY 11, which had been in place since 1924. In 1927, NY 11 was renumbered to NY 76 to eliminate duplication with the new US 11. In the 1930 renumbering of state highways in New York, NY 76 was broken up and incorporated into several other routes. From Rome to Marcy, the former routing of NY 76 became an extension of NY 49. The route then continued eastward along River Road to a new terminus at Genesee Street (then-NY 5, NY 8, and NY 12) in Utica. On its western end, NY 49 was extended over a previously unnumbered roadway to Volney, where it ended at NY 3C (now NY 3). NY 49 once extended westward into downtown Fulton by way of an overlap with NY 3; however, this overlap was eliminated by 1970.

In 1953, there were 32 accidents of varying degrees along the portion of NY 49 between Rome and Utica. The rash of incidents, coupled with a two-car collision that killed five people in December 1953, led the state Department of Public Works to investigate potential safety issues with the road. Although the study attributed virtually all of the accidents to poor driver judgment, it also noted that the corridor's traffic volume had exceeded the road's capacity. One suggested remedy was the construction of a new highway between Rome and Carey's Corners, NY 49's junction with NY 12C (now NY 291). Plans for the road, which ultimately became the Utica–Rome Expressway, were developed over the next three years and first publicly presented in January 1957. The highway connected to NY 12C and River Road at Carey's Corners by way of a cloverleaf interchange, the first of its kind in the vicinity of Utica. The estimated cost of the new road was $6.962 million (equivalent to $77.9 million in 2024).

Diagram of the interchange between I-790, NY 5, NY 8, NY 12 and NY 49

Construction on the road began in the late 1950s, and was completed in 1960 as part of a rerouted NY 49. At the time, the expressway began at what is now the Griffiss Air Force Base interchange east of Rome. An extension of the freeway southwest to NY 365 south of downtown Rome was opened in 1980, at which time it, as well as another arterial leading southeast from Rome, became part of NY 49. In 1990, an interchange was constructed between Edic Road and the North–South Arterial (NY 5/8/12 and I-790) as part of a larger reconfiguration of the area surrounding New York State Thruway exit 31. Two one-way highways along the Thruway between Edic Road and the Arterial were also built as part of the project.

On July 3, 1999, ground was broken on the final section of the expressway between NY 291 and Edic Road. The $60 million highway (equivalent to $103 million in 2024) was officially opened to traffic on October 23, 2003, as part of NY 49. East of Edic Road, NY 49 utilized the pre-existing one-way highways paralleling the Thruway. The total cost of the Utica–Rome Expressway was $175 million (equivalent to $299 million in 2024). The former routing of NY 49 along River Road from NY 365 to NY 291 was transferred to Oneida County and is now designated as County Route 88 while the segment of River Road from the Dominick Street interchange to New Floyd Road remains part of NY 365. Ownership and maintenance of the remainder of River Road was transferred to the cities and towns it passed through.

=== Marcy Pedestrian Bridge Collapse ===
On October 11, 2002, a pedestrian bridge meant to connect a residential area to Whitesboro High School, under construction across the expressway in Marcy twisted and collapsed, killing one worker and injuring nine more. A machine was screeding the concrete deck, starting from the north end and moving south. As it reached the midpoint, the bridge suddenly twisted and collapsed onto the expressway beneath. Workers had noted that the bridge had seemed noticeably "bouncy" leading up to the incident. Investigators found that the most likely reason for collapse was lateral-torsional buckling. The under-construction expressway and bridge were not open to the public at the time of collapse.

== Future ==
There are efforts within NYSDOT to renumber NY Routes 49 and 365 (from Utica to Thruway Exit 33 in the Town of Verona) to NY Route 790, with the eventual plan of renumbering it again as an extension of I-790. The cost for the conversion to Interstate standards is estimated to be between $150 million and $200 million.

U.S. Representative Michael Arcuri introduced legislation in July 2010 that would redesignate the 11-mile (18 km) portion of NY 49 from the North–South Arterial in Utica to NY 825 in Rome as part of I-790. The conversion is expected to cost between $1.5 and $2 million, which would be used to install new signage along the expressway. By adding the Utica–Rome Expressway to the Interstate Highway System, the area would receive approximately $10 million in additional federal highway funding over the next five years. According to Arcuri, the proposed redesignation is part of a larger, long-term goal of creating an Interstate Highway-standard freeway that would begin at Thruway exit 33 in Verona and pass through Rome before ending at Thruway exit 31. The portion of NY 49 east of NY 825 already meets Interstate Highway standards.

== Major intersections ==
County	Location	mi	km	Destinations	Notes
Oswego	Palermo	0.00	0.00	NY 3 – Fulton, Mexico	Western terminus; hamlet of Farley Corners
Oswego	Palermo	2.28	3.67	NY 264 – Syracuse, Watertown	Hamlet of Suttons Corner
Oswego	Central Square	10.14	16.32	US 11 (Main Street)	
Oswego	Central Square	11.27	18.14	I-81 – Syracuse, Watertown	Exit 106 on I-81; diamond interchange
Oneida	Vienna	32.95	53.03	NY 13 south – Sylvan Beach, Canastota, Verona Beach State Park	Western terminus of NY 13 / NY 49 overlap; hamlet of North Bay
Oneida	Vienna	34.40	55.36	NY 13 north – McConnellsville, Camden	Eastern terminus of NY 13 / NY 49 overlap; hamlet of Vienna
Oneida	Verona	41.40	66.63	NY 46 south – Oneida	Western terminus of NY 46 / NY 49 overlap; hamlet of New London
Oneida	Rome	46.61	75.01	NY 69 west (Rome-Taberg Road) – Camden	Western terminus of NY 49 / NY 69 overlap
Oneida	Rome	48.91	78.71	NY 26 north / NY 46 north – Delta Lake State Park	Eastern terminus of NY 46 / NY 49 overlap; western terminus of NY 26 / NY 49 overlap
Oneida	Rome	Western end of freeway section			
Oneida	Rome	49.92	80.34	NY 26 south / NY 365 west to I-90 / New York Thruway west – Oneida	Eastern terminus of NY 26 / NY 49 overlap; western terminus of NY 49 / NY 365 overlap
Oneida	Rome	50.76	81.69	NY 69 east / NY 233 south – Stanwix, Westmoreland	Eastern terminus of NY 49 / NY 69 overlap; northern terminus of NY 233
Oneida	Rome	51.88	83.49	NY 365 east (East Dominick Street) – Barneveld	Westbound exit is combined with NY 825 exit; eastern terminus of NY 49 / NY 365 overlap
Oneida	Rome			NY 825 north – Griffiss Park	Southern terminus of NY 825
Oneida	Town of Marcy	58.06	93.44	To Oneida CR 88A River Street - Oriskany ( NY 922E)	
Oneida	Town of Marcy	60.18	96.85	NY 291 – Whitesboro, Stittville, Marcy Business District	
Oneida	Town of Marcy	61.41	98.83	CR 30 (Cavanaugh Road) / NY 922A – Whitesboro	Hamlet of Marcy
Oneida	Town of Marcy	63.13	101.60	CR 34 (Marcy-SUNYIT Parkway) – SUNYIT, Marcy Business District	No westbound entrance
Oneida	Utica			NY 5 west (I-790 west) / NY 8 / NY 12 west – Downtown Utica, Poland, Watertown	Eastbound exit and westbound entrance
Oneida	Utica	64.13	103.21	I-790 east / NY 5 east to I-90 Toll / New York Thruway	Eastern terminus
1.000 mi = 1.609 km; 1.000 km = 0.621 mi: Concurrency terminus; Incomplete access

== See also ==
- List of county routes in Oneida County, New York
