= New York State Route 365 =

State highway in central New York, US

New York State Route 365
- Map of Herkimer and Oneida counties with NY 365 highlighted in red and NY 365A highlighted in pink

Route information
- Maintained by NYSDOT and the city of Rome
- Length: 44.26 mi (71.23 km)
- Existed: 1932–present

Major junctions
- West end: NY 5 in Oneida Castle
- I-90 Toll / New York Thruway near Oneida; NY 49 in Rome; NY 12 / NY 28 near Barneveld
- East end: NY 8 in Ohio

Location
- Country: United States
- State: New York
- Counties: Oneida, Herkimer

Highway system
- New York Highways; Interstate; US; State; Reference; Parkways
← NY 364	→ NY 366

New York State Route 365 (NY 365) is an east–west state highway in the central portion of New York, United States. It extends for 44.26 miles (71.23 km) from an intersection with NY 5, east of the Madison County city of Oneida to a junction with NY 8 in the Herkimer County town of Ohio. The portion of NY 365 in western and central Oneida County is a regionally important highway that serves densely populated areas, including the cities of Oneida and Rome. In Verona, a town situated midway between the two locations, NY 365 passes by the Turning Stone Resort & Casino and connects to the New York State Thruway (Interstate 90 or I-90). East of Barneveld, a village in eastern Oneida County, NY 365 is a rural connector road that runs along the Hinckley Reservoir, a waterbody that extends into Herkimer County and Adirondack Park.

Modern NY 365 was originally designated as part of several routes in the 1930 renumbering of state highways in New York. One of these was New York State Route 287, which extended from Barneveld to Ohio via Prospect. NY 365 itself was assigned in 1932, utilizing its current alignment from Verona to Barneveld. At the time, the route also extended west into Oneida on what is now NY 365A and northeast through the North Country to Plattsburgh by way of several pre-existing state routes. NY 365 was realigned to bypass Oneida in 1949—giving way to NY 365A—and truncated to end at NY 12C (partly now NY 291) in the late 1950s. The route was extended to its present eastern terminus on January 1, 1970, following the elimination of NY 12C and NY 287.

== Route description ==
Most of NY 365 is maintained by the New York State Department of Transportation (NYSDOT). The only section not maintained by the state lies within the inner district of the city of Rome, where 1.01 miles (1.63 km) of the route are city-maintained. State maintenance of NY 365 ends at the north end of the ramp connecting the eastbound Utica–Rome Expressway to East Dominick Street and resumes at the point where East Dominick Street exits the inner district of Rome.

=== West of Rome ===
NY 365 begins at an intersection with NY 5 in Oneida Castle, a village just east of the city of Oneida. It heads north through the village as State Street, passing several residential blocks before it meets NY 365A (Prospect Street) at a junction just outside the village limits in the town of Verona. From here, NY 365 takes on a more northeasterly routing as it travels through the hamlet of Sconondoa and proceeds through a mostly residential area of Verona. About 2 miles (3.2 km) northeast of Oneida Castle, the route widens from a two-lane undivided highway to a four-lane divided highway as it passes the sprawling Turning Stone Resort & Casino and connects to the New York State Thruway (I-90) at exit 33. Just past the Thruway exit is the hamlet of Dams Corner, where NY 365 intersects NY 31, a major east–west route that turns south here toward the village of Vernon.

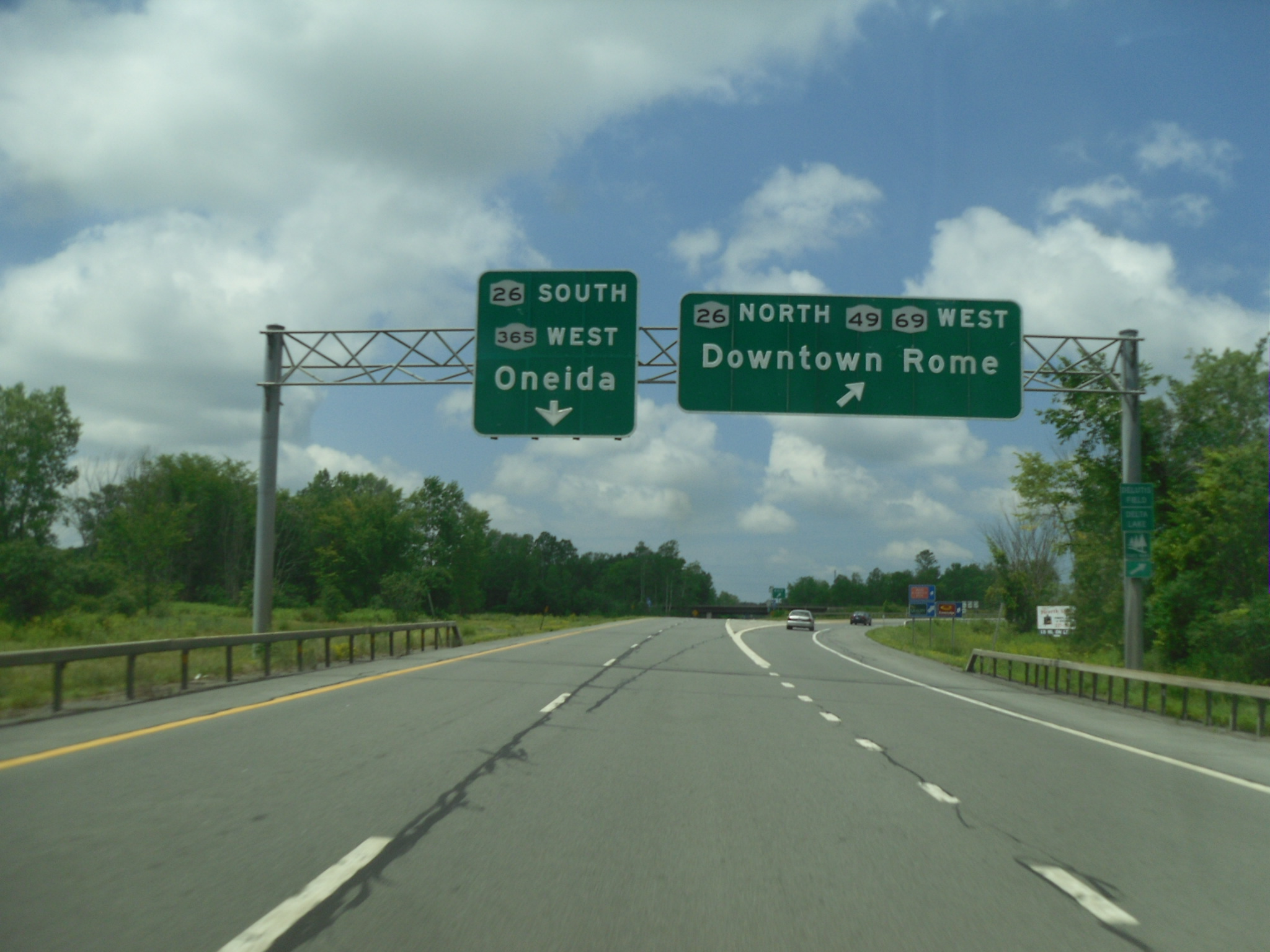
NY 365 west at NY 26 north in Rome

From NY 31, NY 365 continues as a divided highway through gradually less developed areas of the town of Verona. After passing through an area known as Cagwin Corners, it enters an undeveloped, marshy portion of Verona, paralleling the CSX Transportation-owned Mohawk Subdivision rail line for roughly 3.5 miles (5.6 km) as both head into the outer district of the city of Rome. While the railroad continues almost due northeast toward Rome's inner district, NY 365 gradually turns to the east, traversing more marshlands and passing the Mohawk Correctional Facility as it intersects NY 26. At this point, NY 26 turns east, overlapping with NY 365 as the divided highway becomes the Utica–Rome Expressway, a limited-access highway linking the cities of Rome and Utica.

NY 26 leaves NY 365 at the first interchange on the freeway, a directional T interchange with East Erie Boulevard. At the same time, NY 49 and NY 69 enter the expressway, and both routes follow NY 365 east for 0.5 miles (0.8 km) to the next exit near the hamlet of Stanwix. Here, the swamps give way to more developed areas as NY 69 exits the freeway and briefly overlaps with NY 233 through Stanwix. Past the junction, the expressway turns northward, crossing the Mohawk River, the Mohawk Subdivision, and the Erie Canal to reach the inner district of Rome. On the northern bank of the canal, NY 365 splits from the freeway at an interchange connecting to East Dominick Street, leaving just NY 49 on the Utica–Rome Expressway.

=== East of Rome ===
Now on the two-lane East Dominick Street, NY 365 passes through a mostly commercial area of Rome, closely paralleling NY 49 to an intersection with Shady Grove Trail, a local street linking NY 365 to NY 825 and the former Griffiss Air Force Base. The route continues on, passing under NY 825 itself before entering a more residential portion of Rome's outer district and becoming River Road. NY 365 leaves River Road about 1 mile (1.6 km) later to follow New Floyd Road into the town of Floyd. While on New Floyd Road, NY 365 follows a mostly southwest–northeast alignment that the route maintains up through the village of Barneveld. The route crosses areas consisting of homes, forests, and farmland on its way through the hamlet of Floyd to a junction with NY 291 in the adjacent town of Marcy.

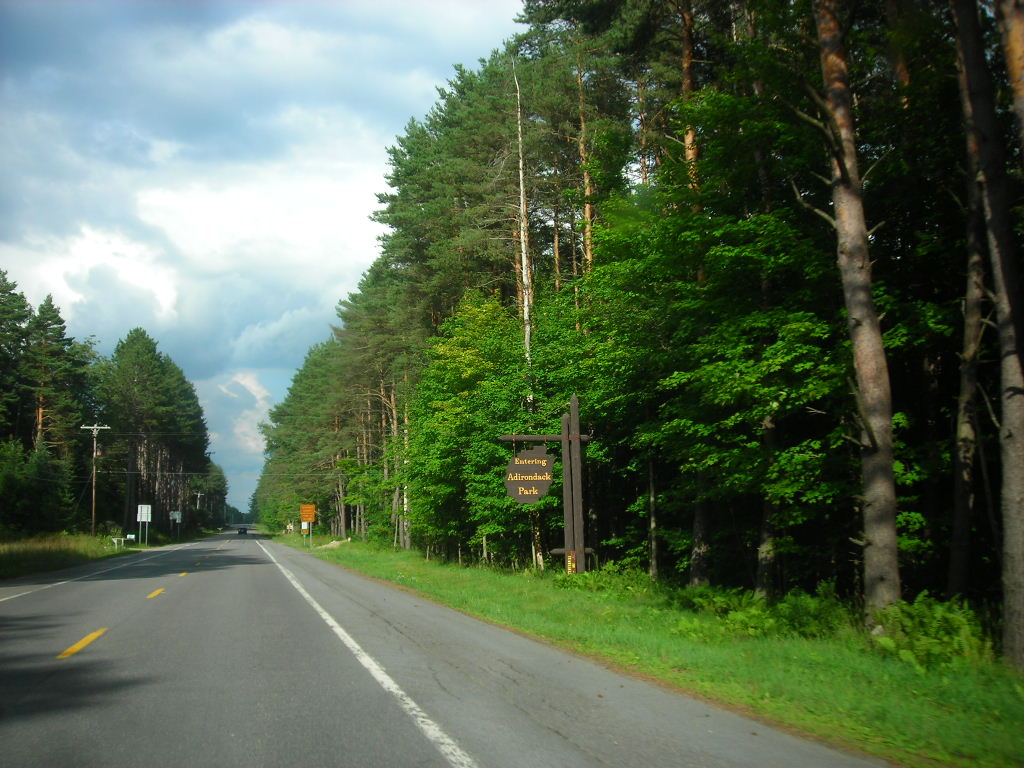
NY 365 entering the Adirondack Park in Remsen

Beyond this intersection, NY 365 traverses mostly open areas of the town of Trenton before it enters the village of Holland Patent, mostly based around NY 365's junction with NY 274. NY 365 continues on, crossing the isolated and sparsely populated areas that separate the villages of Holland Patent and Barneveld. It initially enters Barneveld on Boon Street; however, NY 365 turns north at the first intersection it encounters in the village to follow Mappa Avenue back out of the community. Instead, NY 365 connects to NY 12 and NY 28 at an interchange 1 mile (1.6 km) north of Barneveld. Past the junction, the route heads through forested areas to the northern edge of the village of Prospect. Here, it meets Prospect Road, formerly NY 28B and now NY 920V, an unsigned reference route.

East of Prospect, NY 365 continues to travel in a northeastern direction, passing amongst forests as it follows the northern edge of the Hinckley Reservoir, a large man-made lake fed by West Canada Creek. It runs across parts of the towns of Trenton and Remsen to the Herkimer County line, at which point NY 365 enters Adirondack Park. In Herkimer County, NY 365 quietly runs eastward through the towns of Russia and Ohio, remaining close to the north edge of the reservoir and, past its east end, West Canada Creek. The route ends 6.5 miles (10.5 km) from the county line at an intersection with NY 8 southwest of the hamlet of Wilmurt.

== History ==
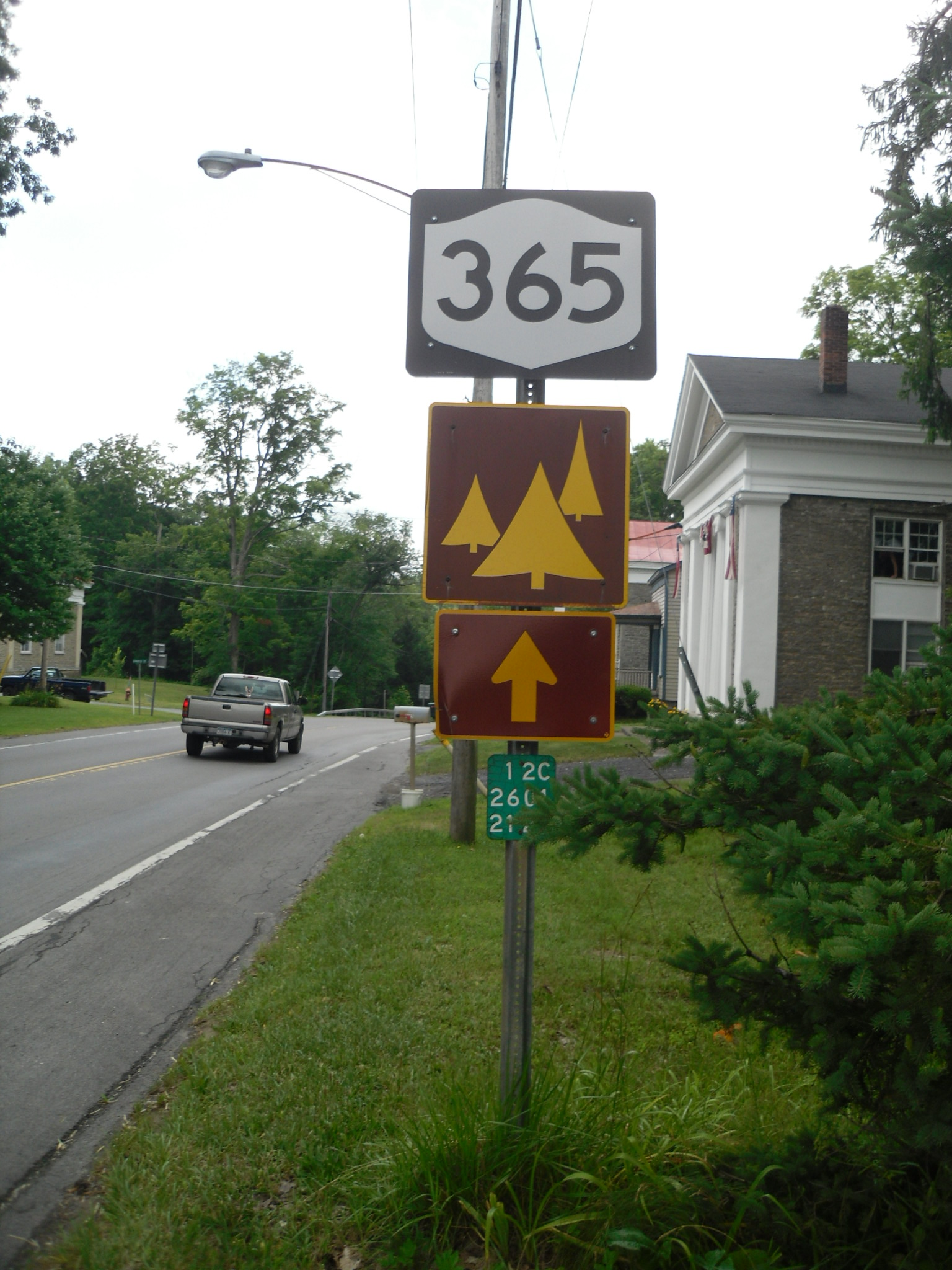
Sign assembly on NY 365 in Oneida County. The reference marker reads "12C" for NY 12C, the former designation of part of NY 365.

In 1908, the New York State Legislature created Route 29, an unsigned legislative route extending from the eastern city limits of Oneida in the south to Rome in the north. Also created at this time was Route 25, which began in Whitesboro and passed through Holland Patent and Barneveld on its way to the North Country and ultimately to Albany. In the 1930 renumbering of state highways in New York, legislative Route 29 became part of NY 5S, which began at NY 5 southwest of Oneida and followed Lenox Avenue and Prospect Street through the city before proceeding to Rome on Route 29's former alignment. At Rome, NY 5S turned eastward and continued to Utica. To the northeast, the Holland Patent–Barneveld segment of legislative Route 25 became part of NY 12C, an alternate route of NY 12 between Utica and Barneveld. NY 5S and NY 12C were linked by NY 46A, a newly designated alternate route of NY 46 between Rome and Western that overlapped with NY 12C in the vicinity of Holland Patent.

NY 365 was assigned in 1932 to an alignment extending from Oneida northeast through Adirondack Park to the city of Plattsburgh in Clinton County via Rome, Barneveld, Old Forge, Blue Mountain Lake, Tupper Lake, and Bloomingdale. Initially, all of NY 365 was concurrent to at least one other route: NY 5S from Oneida to Rome, NY 46A from Rome to Holland Patent, NY 12C between Holland Patent and Barneveld, NY 28 from Barneveld through Forestport to Blue Mountain Lake, NY 10 (now NY 30) between Blue Mountain Lake and Lake Clear Junction, NY 86 (modern NY 186) from there to Harrietstown, NY 408 between Harrietstown and Gabriels, NY 192 from Gabriels to Bloomingdale, and NY 3 from Bloomingdale to Plattsburgh. NY 408 was removed c. 1938, making the Harrietstown–Gabriels segment of NY 365 the first to be independent of any other route. The next was the piece between Oneida and Rome, which became solely NY 365 after NY 5S was truncated eastward to Utica in the early 1940s.

In the mid-1940s, NY 365 was realigned between Wawbeek and Bloomingdale to overlap NY 3, bypassing Lake Clear and Gabriels in order to serve Saranac Lake instead. The route was altered again on January 1, 1949, to bypass Oneida to the east and connect to NY 5 in Oneida Castle. Its former routing through Oneida became NY 365A. NY 365 was truncated southwestward to its junction with NY 12C west of Holland Patent in the late 1950s, eliminating the bevy of overlaps between NY 365 and other routes in the North Country. The overlap between NY 365 and NY 46A was eliminated in the early 1950s after NY 46A was renumbered to NY 274 and truncated to run only from Holland Patent to Western.

Originally, modern NY 365 between Barneveld and NY 8 in Ohio was designated as NY 287 in the 1930 renumbering. NY 287 was extended southwestward to Floyd in the early 1950s, replacing a portion of NY 46A on Koenig Road between River Road (NY 49) and NY 365. It was realigned again by 1954 to follow NY 365 past Koenig Road into Rome but truncated back to its original western terminus in Barneveld in the late 1950s. On January 1, 1970, the NY 12C and NY 287 designations were eliminated and replaced with an extended NY 365 from Holland Patent to Ohio.

== Future ==
There are efforts within NYSDOT to renumber NY Routes 49 and 365 (from Utica to Thruway Exit 33 in the Town of Verona) to NY Route 790, with the eventual plan of renumbering it again as an extension of I-790. The cost for the conversion to Interstate standards is estimated to be between $150 million and $200 million.

U.S. Representative Michael Arcuri introduced legislation in July 2010 that would redesignate the 11-mile (18 km) portion of NY 49 from the North–South Arterial in Utica to NY 825 in Rome as part of I-790. The conversion is expected to cost between $1.5 and $2 million, which would be used to install new signage along the expressway. By adding the Utica–Rome Expressway to the Interstate Highway System, the area would receive approximately $10 million in additional federal highway funding over the next five years. According to Arcuri, the proposed redesignation is part of a larger, long-term goal of creating an Interstate Highway-standard freeway that would begin at Thruway exit 33 in Verona and pass through Rome before ending at Thruway exit 31. The portion of NY 49 east of NY 825 already meets Interstate Highway standards.

== Major intersections ==
County	Location	mi	km	Destinations	Notes
Oneida	Oneida Castle	0.00	0.00	NY 5 (Seneca Avenue) – Oneida, Sherrill	Western terminus
Oneida	Vernon	0.87	1.40	NY 365A west (Prospect Street) – Oneida	Eastern terminus of NY 365A
Oneida	Verona	3.83	6.16	I-90 Toll / New York Thruway – Albany, Buffalo	Exit 33 (I-90 / Thruway)
Oneida	Verona	4.79	7.71	NY 31 – Vernon Downs	Hamlet of Verona
Oneida	Rome	11.19	18.01	NY 26 south (Henderberg Road) – Lowell	Western terminus of NY 26 / NY 365 overlap
Oneida	Rome	13.24	21.31	NY 26 north (East Erie Boulevard) / NY 49 west / NY 69 west – Downtown Rome	Interchange; western terminus of NY 49 / NY 365 and NY 69 / NY 365 overlaps; eastern terminus of NY 26 / NY 365 overlap
Oneida	Rome	13.56	21.82	NY 69 east / NY 233 – Stanwix, Westmoreland	Interchange; eastern terminus of NY 69 / NY 365 overlap; northern terminus of NY 233
Oneida	Rome	14.68	23.63	NY 49 east (Utica–Rome Expressway) – Utica	Interchange; eastern terminus of NY 49 / NY 365 overlap
Oneida	Rome			To NY 825 – Griffiss Technical Park, Griffiss International Airport	Access via King Pin Line
Oneida	Marcy	23.05	37.10	NY 291 south – Utica	Northern terminus of NY 291
Oneida	Holland Patent	24.79	39.90	NY 274 north	Southern terminus of NY 274
Oneida	Trenton	28.81	46.37	NY 921D (Mappa Avenue) to NY 12 south / NY 28 south	Northern terminus of unsigned NY 921D; former routing of NY 12 and 28; to NY 12 and NY 28 south only signed eastbound; hamlet of Barneveld
Oneida	Trenton	29.71	47.81	NY 12 / NY 28 – Utica, Alder Creek, Old Forge	Partial cloverleaf interchange
Oneida	Trenton	31.93	51.39	NY 920V (Prospect Road) – Remsen	Southern terminus of former NY 28B; eastern terminus of unsigned NY 920V; hamlet of Prospect
Herkimer	Ohio	44.26	71.23	NY 8 – Speculator, Poland, Utica	Eastern terminus
1.000 mi = 1.609 km; 1.000 km = 0.621 mi: Concurrency terminus; Electronic toll collection

== NY 365A ==
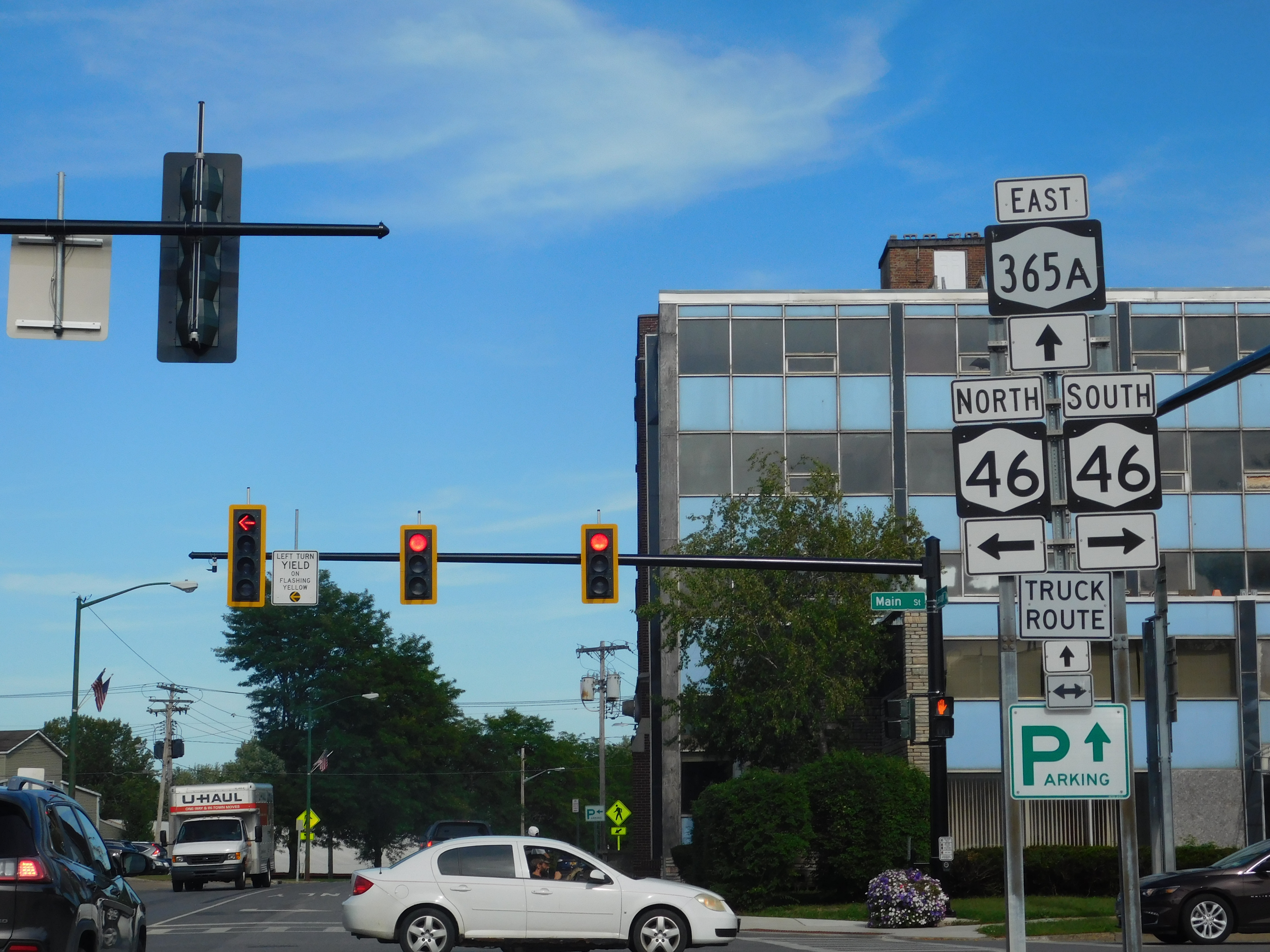
NY 365A eastbound at NY 46 in Oneida

New York State Route 365A
- Location: Oneida
- Length: 3.47 mi (5.58 km)
- Existed: January 1, 1949–present

NY 365A is a 3.47-mile-long (5.58 km) east-west spur connecting NY 365 to downtown Oneida. The route begins at NY 5 southwest of the city and intersects NY 46 in the center of Oneida before ending at NY 365 east of the city. It was assigned on January 1, 1949, after NY 365 was realigned to bypass Oneida to the east.

County	Location	mi	km	Destinations	Notes
Madison	Oneida	0.00	0.00	NY 5 (Genesee Street) – Sherrill, Wampsville	Western terminus
Madison	Oneida	2.36	3.80	NY 46 (Main Street)	
Oneida	Town of Vernon	3.47	5.58	NY 365 to I-90 Toll / New York Thruway – Rome, Oneida Castle	Eastern terminus, access to I-90 via NY 365 east
1.000 mi = 1.609 km; 1.000 km = 0.621 mi
