= North–South Arterial Highway =

The North–South Arterial Highway is a 5.5-mile-long (8.9 km) expressway located within Oneida County, New York. It contains segments of the following highways:

- New York State Route 12 and New York State Route 8 north of Interstate 90 (New York State Thruway)
- Interstate 790 and New York State Route 5 south of Interstate 90 (New York State Thruway)
