= New York State Route 5A (disambiguation) =

New York State Route 5A is an east–west state highway in Oneida County, New York, United States, that was established in the mid-1930s.

New York State Route 5A may also refer to:

- New York State Route 5A (1924–mid-1920s) from Buffalo to Albany
- New York State Route 5A (1933–1937) in Cayuga County
