= Yorkville, New York =

Yorkville, New York may refer to more than one place in the United States:

- Yorkville, Manhattan, a neighborhood in New York City
- Yorkville, Oneida County, New York
