= New York State Route 11 =

New York State Route 11 may refer to:

- New York State Route 11 (1924–1927) in Central New York
- U.S. Route 11 in New York, the only route numbered "11" in New York since 1926
