= New York State Route 8 =

Highway in New York, USA

New York State Route 8
- NY 8 highlighted in red

Route information
- Maintained by NYSDOT
- Length: 207.45 mi (333.86 km)
- Existed: 1930–present

Major junctions
- South end: Future I-86 / NY 10 / NY 17 in Deposit
- I-88 in Sidney; NY 80 in New Berlin; US 20 in Bridgewater; I-790 / NY 5 / NY 12 / NY 840 in Utica; NY 30 in Speculator; NY 28 in Johnsburg; I-87 / US 9 in Chestertown
- North end: NY 9N in Hague

Location
- Country: United States
- State: New York
- Counties: Delaware, Otsego, Chenango, Madison, Oneida, Herkimer, Hamilton, Warren

Highway system
- New York Highways; Interstate; US; State; Reference; Parkways
← NY 7B	→ US 9

New York State Route 8 (NY 8) is a 207.45-mile-long (333.86 km) north-south state highway in the central part of New York in the United States. It runs in a southwest-to-northeast direction from the Southern Tier to the northern part of Lake George. The southern terminus of the route is at an interchange with NY 17, where it begins concurrent with NY 10 in the town of Deposit. Its northern terminus is at a junction with NY 9N in the town of Hague. Roughly midway between the two endpoints, NY 8 passes through Utica, where it overlaps NY 5, NY 12, and Interstate 790 (I-790) along one segment of the North–South Arterial.

NY 8 was assigned as part of the 1930 renumbering of state highways in New York and originally extended north to a ferry across Lake Champlain at Putnam Station, where it connected to Vermont Route F-10 (VT F-10). The route was realigned slightly on its northern end by 1933 to connect to another ferry leading to VT F-9 east of Ticonderoga. By the following year, it was altered again to use the new Champlain Bridge at Crown Point to connect to VT 17. This was made possible by way of a long concurrency with NY 9N and NY 22. NY 8 was truncated to its current northern terminus c. 1968. In the 1960s and 1970s, NY 8 was moved onto new freeways around and through the city of Utica. The 2017 route log erroneously shows that NY 8's southern terminus is at what is the northern terminus of the overlap with NY 10.

== Route description ==
=== Southern Tier ===
NY 8 begins at an interchange with NY 17 in Deposit that also serves as the southern terminus of NY 10. NY 8 and NY 10 form a brief concurrency north along the West Branch of the Delaware River before separating at the southeastern edge of the Cannonsville Reservoir northeast of Deposit. While NY 10 follows the southern edge of the reservoir to the east, NY 8 continues north, passing to the east of Oquaga Creek State Park (and connecting to the park via a pair of local roads) before meeting NY 206 in Masonville. From Masonville, NY 8 heads north to Sidney, where it meets I-88 at an interchange. NY 8 leaves the village when crosses the Susquehanna River, briefly entering Otsego County at its far southwestern corner, where it intersects NY 7 before entering Chenango County adjacent to the Unadilla River, a tributary of the Susquehanna.

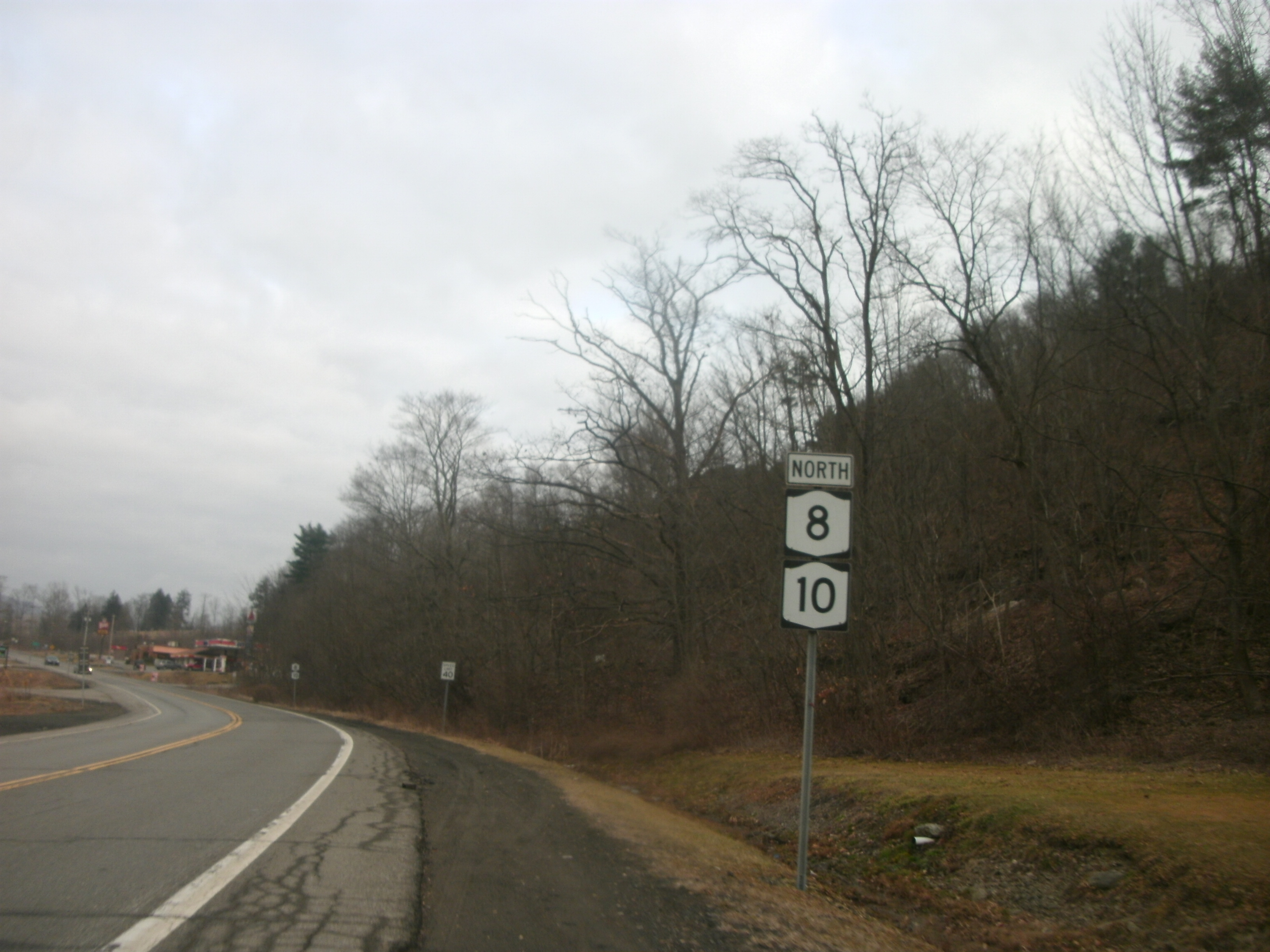
NY 8 and NY 10 passing through Deposit, just north of the interchange with NY 17

NY 8 parallels the Unadilla River northward through Mount Upton to New Berlin, where it meets NY 80. The routes overlap for a short distance to the north before NY 80 separates to the northwest toward Sherburne. NY 8, however, continues along the Unadilla River through several small communities before separating from the river just south of the Madison-Oneida County line.

=== Utica area ===
Shortly after crossing into Oneida County, NY 8 intersects U.S. Route 20 (US 20) in Bridgewater. The route continues northward, passing through Cassville and Clayville before becoming a limited-access highway just north of Clayville. Near Sauquoit, NY 8 has exits for Pinnacle Road and Elm Street prior to entering the Utica suburbs. In New Hartford, the route has an exit with Genesee Street prior to meeting NY 5 and NY 12 at a cloverleaf interchange southwest of downtown Utica. While the right-of-way of NY 8 continues to the northeast through the cloverleaf as NY 840, NY 8 joins NY 5 and NY 12 as the three routes enter downtown on the North–South Arterial.

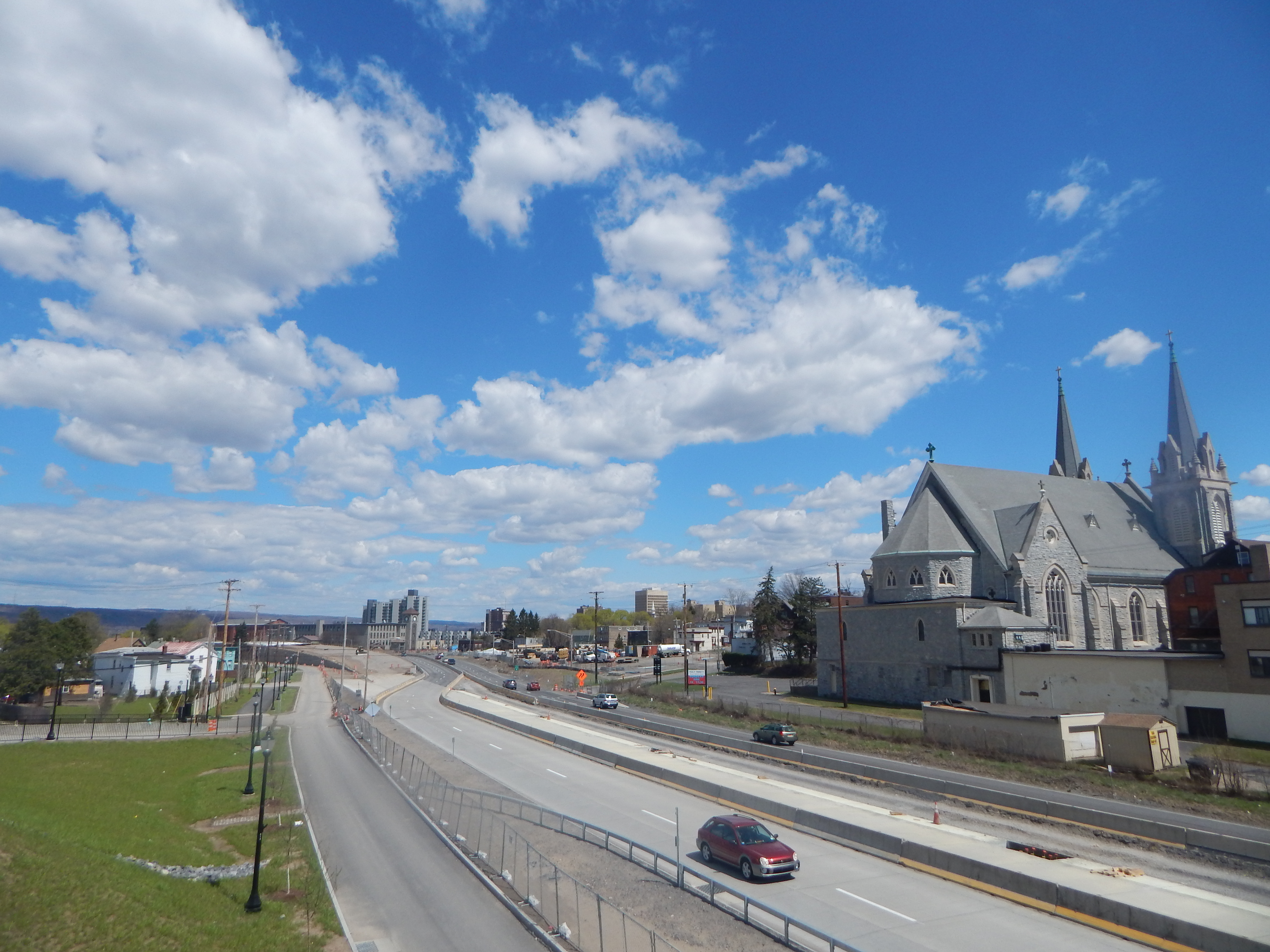
The Utica Arterial under construction in May 2015

Near the northern edge of downtown, NY 5, NY 8, and NY 12 interchange with NY 5A and NY 5S on the southern bank of the Mohawk River. At the exit, the three state routes are joined on the arterial by I-790, which follows NY 5, NY 8, and NY 12 across the Mohawk River and the neighboring Erie Canal to a large interchange north of the canal. Here, I-790 and NY 5 separate from the concurrency while NY 8 and NY 12 remain concurrent into Deerfield as a limited-access highway. After an interchange with a former routing of NY 12, NY 8 separates from the highway and returns to an at-grade roadway as it heads northeast to Poland. Near the Oneida-Herkimer County line (here delimited by West Canada Creek), NY 8 merges with NY 28 and follows the route across the county line (as well as the creek) into Poland. In the center of the village, NY 8 splits from NY 28 and heads northeast into Adirondack Park.

=== Adirondack Park ===
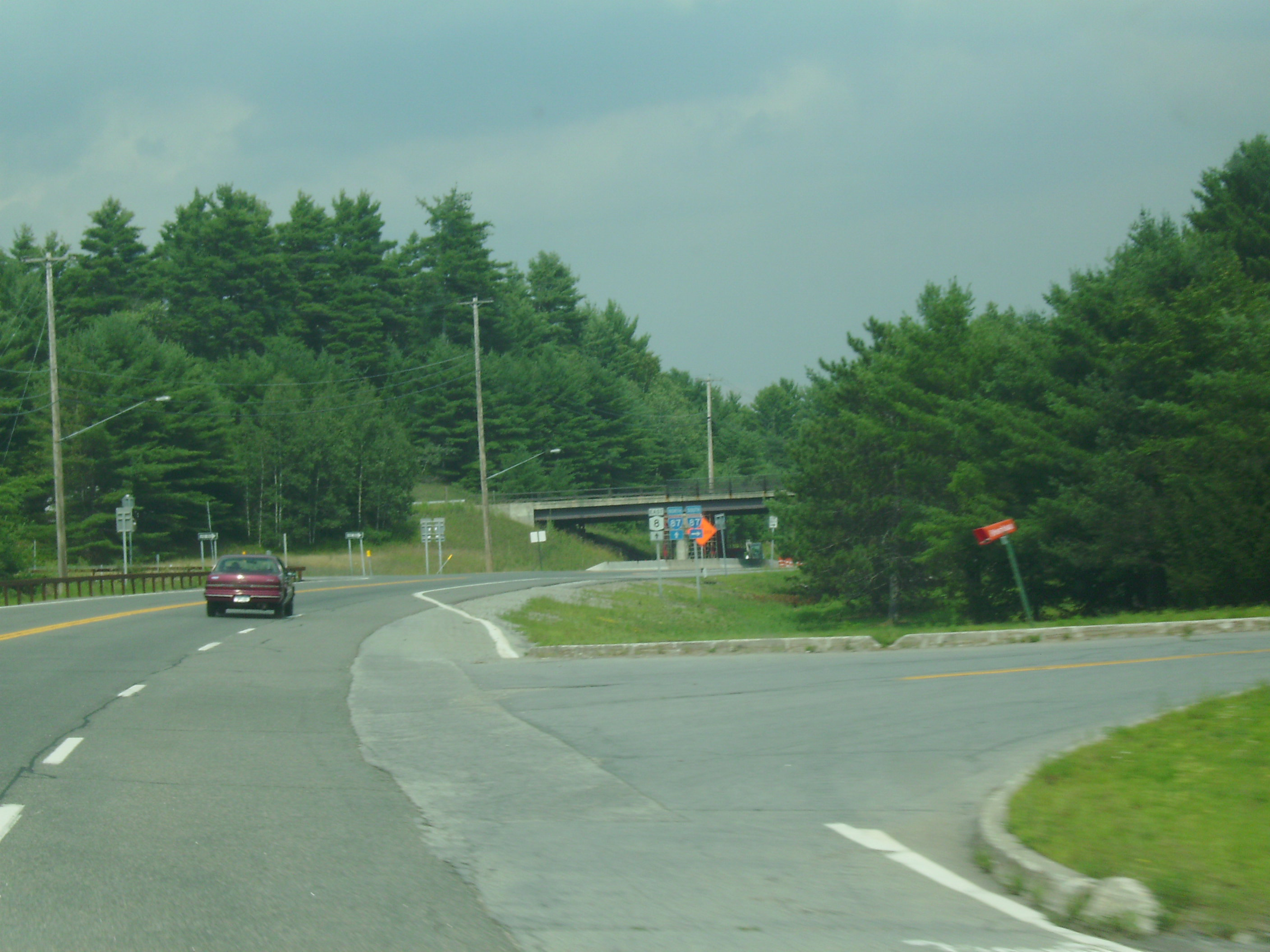
NY 8 approaching I-87

Within Adirondack Park, NY 8 follows a northeast–southwest routing as it crosses the lower half of the park. Near Ohio, NY 8 intersects NY 365 due north of where it enters the park. Past NY 365, NY 8 heads east to Higgins Bay, where it intersects the northern terminus of NY 10. The route continues northeast to Speculator, where it meets NY 30. NY 30 turns east onto NY 8, forming an overlap southeast to Wells, where NY 8 separates from NY 30 and heads to the northeast into Warren County. Formerly, NY 8 became an east–west highway near Speculator, but was re-signed around 2010 to north–south to be consistent with the other sections of the highway.

In Wevertown, NY 8 intersects NY 28 for the final time prior to meeting US 9 at Loon Lake. The two routes merge, forming an overlap east to Chestertown, where US 9 splits from NY 8 and continues south. NY 8, however, heads east, meeting I-87 shortly after departing US 9. Past I-87, NY 8 follows the southern edge of Brant Lake to the northeast before turning to the east toward Hague, where it terminates at NY 9N.

== History ==
=== Origins and terminus changes ===
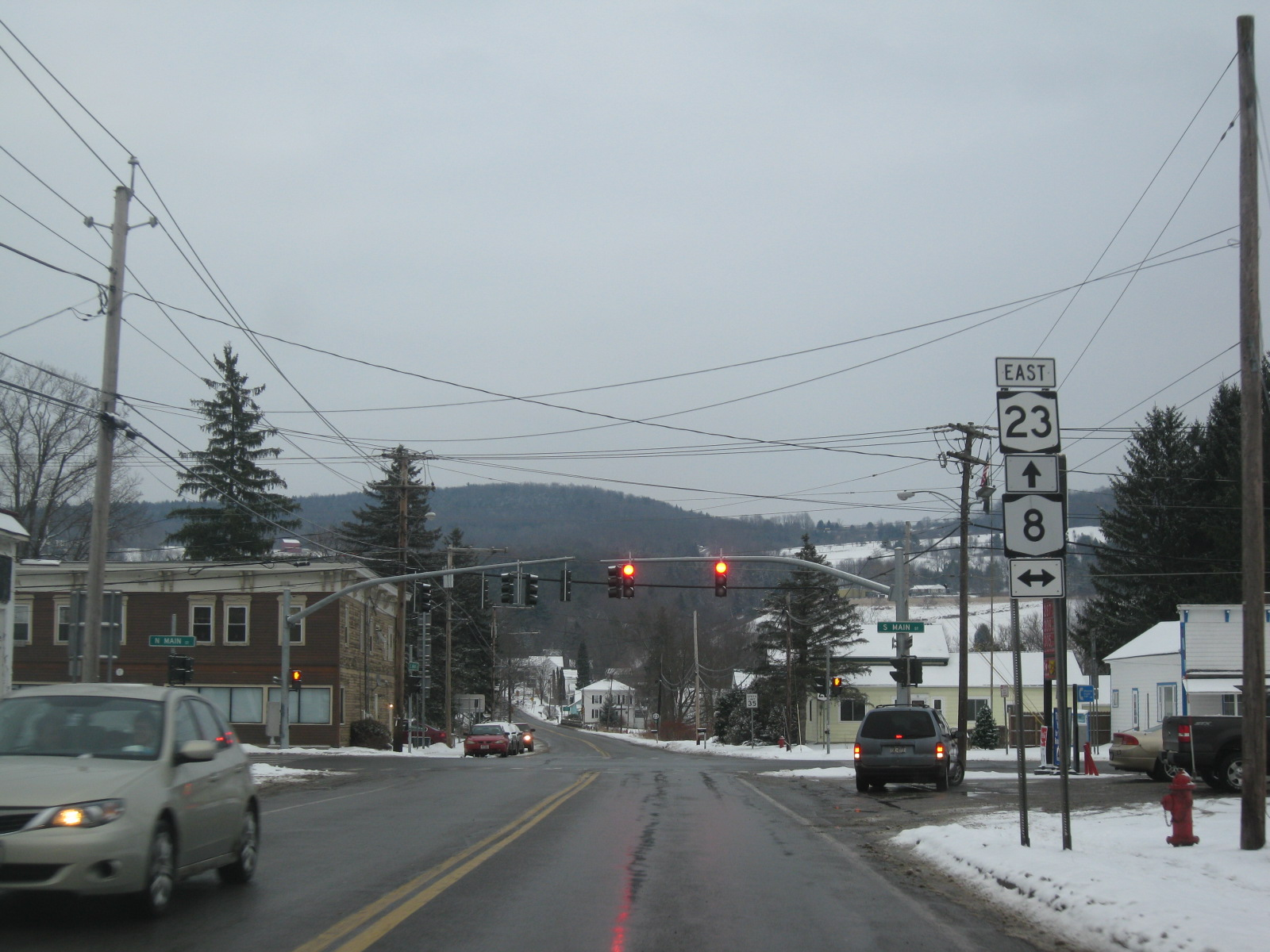
NY 23 eastbound at NY 8 in South New Berlin

In the 1930 renumbering of state highways in New York, NY 8 was assigned to most of its current alignment from Deposit to Hague. The route also extended eastward to Wright (southeast of Ticonderoga) on modern NY 9N, NY 22, and County Route 2 (CR 2), where it connected to VT F-10 by way of a ferry across Lake Champlain. From Clayville to Utica, NY 8 was originally routed along Oneida Street before overlapping with NY 5 and NY 12 along Genesee Street in downtown Utica. After crossing the Mohawk River and the Erie Canal, the three routes separated at the intersection of Herkimer Road, Trenton Road, and Coventry Avenue northeast of downtown. NY 8 then followed Coventry Avenue and Walker Road northeast to Deerfield, where NY 8 joined its modern alignment.

Prior to 1930, what became NY 8 in the renumbering carried multiple designations along its routing. In 1924, the segment of Genesee Street in Utica that became NY 8 was designated as part of NY 5 and NY 12. Additionally, the portion of NY 8 from Wevertown to Chestertown became part of NY 10. The segment from the modern intersection of US 9 and NY 8 to Chestertown was also designated as part of NY 6. By 1926, what became NY 8 from Sidney to New Berlin and from Bridgewater to downtown Utica was designated as NY 44. Between New Berlin and Bridgewater, NY 44 followed what is now NY 80 through Edmeston to West Burlington and NY 51 from West Burlington to US 20. It continued west to Bridgewater by way of an overlap with US 20. From Utica to Wells, the 1930 routing of NY 8 was part of NY 54, which continued south from Wells to Fonda via modern NY 30 and NY 30A. Between Chestertown and Ticonderoga, NY 8 was designated NY 47. Until the renumbering, what became NY 8 was unbuilt from Deposit to Masonville and unnumbered from Masonville to Sidney. Additionally, the segments from New Berlin to Bridgewater and from Wells to Wevertown were unnumbered.

NY 8 was rerouted by 1933 to exit Ticonderoga to the east, using what is now NY 74 to reach Lake Champlain instead. At the lake, NY 8 connected to VT F-9 via the Fort Ticonderoga–Larrabees Point Ferry. The route was realigned again c. 1934 to follow NY 9N and NY 22 north from Ticonderoga to south of Port Henry, where NY 8 turned northeast to follow what is now NY 185 to the Champlain Bridge. The route became VT 17 on the opposite lakeshore. NY 8 was truncated to Hague c. 1968, eliminating its overlaps with NY 9N and NY 22.

The 2017 route log erroneously shows that NY 8's southern terminus at what is the northern terminus of the overlap with NY 10.

=== Relocations and realignments ===
In the early 1950s, construction began on a new arterial highway—known as the North–South Arterial—through downtown Utica. The first portion of the highway to open was the segment between River Road and Trenton Road, which was completed by 1956. It was extended southward to Oriskany Street (NY 5A) by 1961 and completed entirely by 1964; however, NY 8 was not initially realigned to follow the highway. In the mid-1960s, plans were made to construct a new limited-access highway along the NY 8 corridor from Clayville north to New Hartford, where it would connect with the North–South Arterial.

The freeway was constructed and completed in the early 1970s. NY 8 was realigned to follow the highway to New Hartford, from where it continued through Utica on the Arterial and I-790. It rejoined its previous alignment at I-790's interchange with Genesee Street. During this same period, the section of NY 12 between Deerfield and South Trenton was moved onto a new freeway built adjacent to NY 12's original alignment. A connector between NY 12 and NY 8 by way of the Miller Road corridor was built at this time. NY 8 was rerouted in the mid-1970s to follow NY 12 north to its exit with the connector. Here, NY 8 left NY 12 and continued east on the connector to rejoin its original alignment at Walker Road. Ownership and maintenance of NY 8's former routing north of the Utica city limits was transferred to Oneida County, which designated the highway as CR 92.

Originally NY 8 traveled through the village of Sidney and had a brief overlap with NY 7. In the 1970s a new alignment was built to the south of Sidney which connected to the new I-88 interchange.

In April 2014 work began on a $68.3 million project to replace the viaduct over Columbia Street, Lafayette Streets, and Oriskany Boulevard (NY 5A and NY 5S) in Utica. The nearly one mile stretch had signalized at-grade intersections that had been causing safety concerns and some fatalities. In addition to the replacement of the viaduct, the alignment of the arterial was straightened, a new single point urban interchange was built at Court Street, and a pedestrian bridge was built across the roadway. The pedestrian bridge was opened by December 2014, and the remainder of the project was completed by October 2017.

=== Memorial designation ===
On October 29, 2019 Governor Andrew Cuomo signed into law that a portion of NY 8 was to be designated the "Sidney Veterans' Memorial Parkway" from I-88 to southern end of the bridge over the Susquehanna River in the village of Sidney.

== Future ==
Long range plans by the NYSDOT call for an expressway to be built along the NY 8 corridor from NY 17, east of Binghamton, to the St. Lawrence region via Utica.

== Major intersections ==
County	Location	mi	km	Destinations	Notes
Delaware	Town of Deposit	0.00	0.00	Future I-86 / NY 17 – New York City, Binghamton NY 10 begins	Southern terminus; southern terminus of NY 10; diamond interchange; exit 84 on NY 17
Delaware	Town of Deposit	2.16	3.48	NY 10 north – Walton	North end of NY 10 overlap; hamlet of Stilesville
Delaware	Masonville	15.27	24.57	NY 206 – Bainbridge, Walton, Oquaga Creek State Park	
Delaware	Town of Sidney	19.82	31.90	I-88 – Albany, Binghamton	Diamond interchange; exit 9 on I-88
Otsego	Town of Unadilla	21.67	34.87	NY 7	
Chenango	Guilford	29.93	48.17	NY 51 north (Bridge Street) – Gilbertsville, Morris	Southern terminus of NY 51; hamlet of Mount Upton
Chenango	Town of New Berlin	37.85	60.91	NY 23 (West Street / East Street) – Norwich, Oneonta	Hamlet of South New Berlin
Chenango	Village of New Berlin	45.56	73.32	NY 80 east (Genesee Street)	South end of NY 80 overlap
Chenango	Town of New Berlin	46.81	75.33	NY 80 west – Sherburne	North end of NY 80 overlap; hamlet of Five Corners
Oneida	Bridgewater	64.42	103.67	US 20 (State Street) – Sangerfield, West Winfield	Hamlet of Bridgewater
Oneida	Paris			CR 9 (Pinnacle Road) – Sauquoit	Diamond interchange
Oneida	New Hartford			Elm Street –Chadwicks	Southbound exit and northbound entrance; partial diamond interchange
Oneida	New Hartford			CR 26 (Kellogg Road) – Washington Mills	Diamond interchange
Oneida	Utica	79.64	128.17	NY 5 west / NY 12 south / NY 840 west – Syracuse, Binghamton, Whitestown	South end of NY 8/NY 12 overlap; eastern terminus of NY 840; cloverleaf interchange
Oneida	Utica	80.26– 80.66	129.17– 129.81	French Road ( NY 921W) –	Trumpet interchange
Oneida	Utica	80.77– 81.12	129.99– 130.55	Burrstone Road ( NY 921B) – , MVCC, Utica Zoo	Partial cloverleaf interchange
Oneida	Utica	82.82	133.29	NY 5A / NY 5S west – Whitesboro I-790 begins	Southern terminus of I-790; eastern terminus of NY 5A; western terminus of NY 5S
Oneida	Utica	83.59	134.53	I-790 north / NY 5 east / NY 49 west	North end of I-790/NY 5 overlap; eastern terminus of NY 49; to I-90 / Thruway
Oneida	Deerfield	88.48	142.39	NY 12 north – Barneveld, Watertown	North end of NY 12 overlap; trumpet interchange
Oneida	Deerfield	95.46	153.63	NY 28 north – Barneveld	South end of NY 28 overlap
Herkimer	Poland			NY 28 south – Newport, Herkimer	North end of NY 28 overlap
Herkimer	Ohio	110.57	177.95	NY 365 west – Barneveld	Eastern terminus of NY 365
Hamilton	Arietta	132.97	213.99	NY 10 south – Pine Lake	Northern terminus of NY 10
Hamilton	Speculator	145.18	233.64	NY 30 north – Indian Lake	South end of NY 30 overlap
Hamilton	Wells	154.87	249.24	NY 30 south – Wells	North end of NY 30 overlap
Warren	Johnsburg	178.25	286.87	NY 28 – North Creek, Warrensburg	Hamlet of Wevertown
Warren	Chester	183.91	295.97	US 9 north – Schroon Lake	South end of US 9 overlap
Warren	Chester	187.71	302.09	US 9 south – Warrensburg	North end of US 9 overlap; hamlet of Chestertown
Warren	Chester	189.23	304.54	I-87 – Albany, Montreal	Diamond interchange; exit 25 on I-87
Warren	Hague	207.45	333.86	NY 9N – Ticonderoga, Bolton Landing	Northern terminus
1.000 mi = 1.609 km; 1.000 km = 0.621 mi: Concurrency terminus; Incomplete access

== See also ==
- List of county routes in Oneida County, New York
