= New York State Route 5A =

State highway in Oneida County, New York, US

New York State Route 5A
- NY 5A highlighted in red

Route information
- Auxiliary route of NY 5
- Maintained by NYSDOT
- Length: 5.59 mi (9.00 km)
- Existed: mid-1930s–present

Major junctions
- West end: NY 5 in New Hartford
- NY 840 by New York Mills
- East end: I-790 / NY 5 / NY 5S / NY 8 / NY 12 in Utica

Location
- Country: United States
- State: New York
- Counties: Oneida

Highway system
- New York Highways; Interstate; US; State; Reference; Parkways
| ← NY 5 | → NY 5S |

New York State Route 5A (NY 5A) is an east–west state highway located within Oneida County, New York, in the United States. It is a 5.59-mile (9.0 km) alternate route of NY 5 between New Hartford and downtown Utica. At its eastern end, NY 5A becomes NY 5S at an interchange with Interstate 790 (I-790), NY 5, NY 8, and NY 12. The route is four lanes wide and passes through mostly commercial areas. When NY 5A was assigned in the mid-1930s, it ended at Yorkville, a village roughly midway between NY 5 in New Hartford and downtown Utica. It was extended to its present length in the 1940s.

== Route description ==
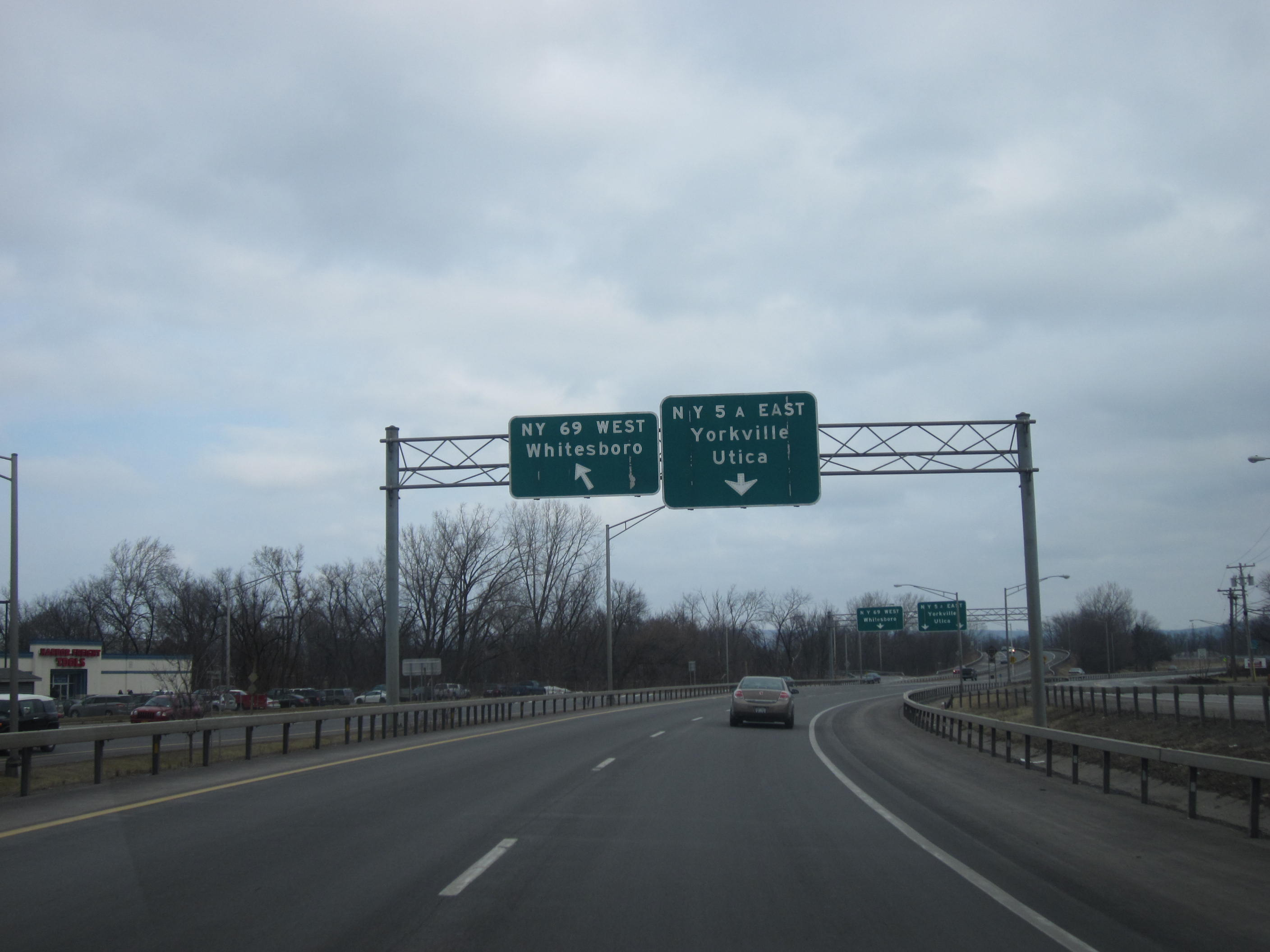
NY 5A east at NY 69 in Whitestown

NY 5A begins at an intersection with NY 5 in New Hartford only 120 yards (110 m) from the eastern terminus of NY 5B. The route heads northeast as the predominantly four-lane wide Commercial Drive, passing the Sangertown Square shopping mall and paralleling Mud Creek as it progresses through New Hartford. It runs past a line of commercial developments on its way to the southwestern extent of the village of New York Mills, where NY 5A meets County Route 21 (Clinton Street) and NY 840 at adjacent junctions. The former intersection is restricted to right-in/right-out movements, while the latter is a single-point urban interchange. Past NY 840, NY 5A straddles the western village line of New York Mills as it serves another stretch of businesses. Along the way, NY 5A crosses over the Sauquoit Creek and enters the town of Whitestown.

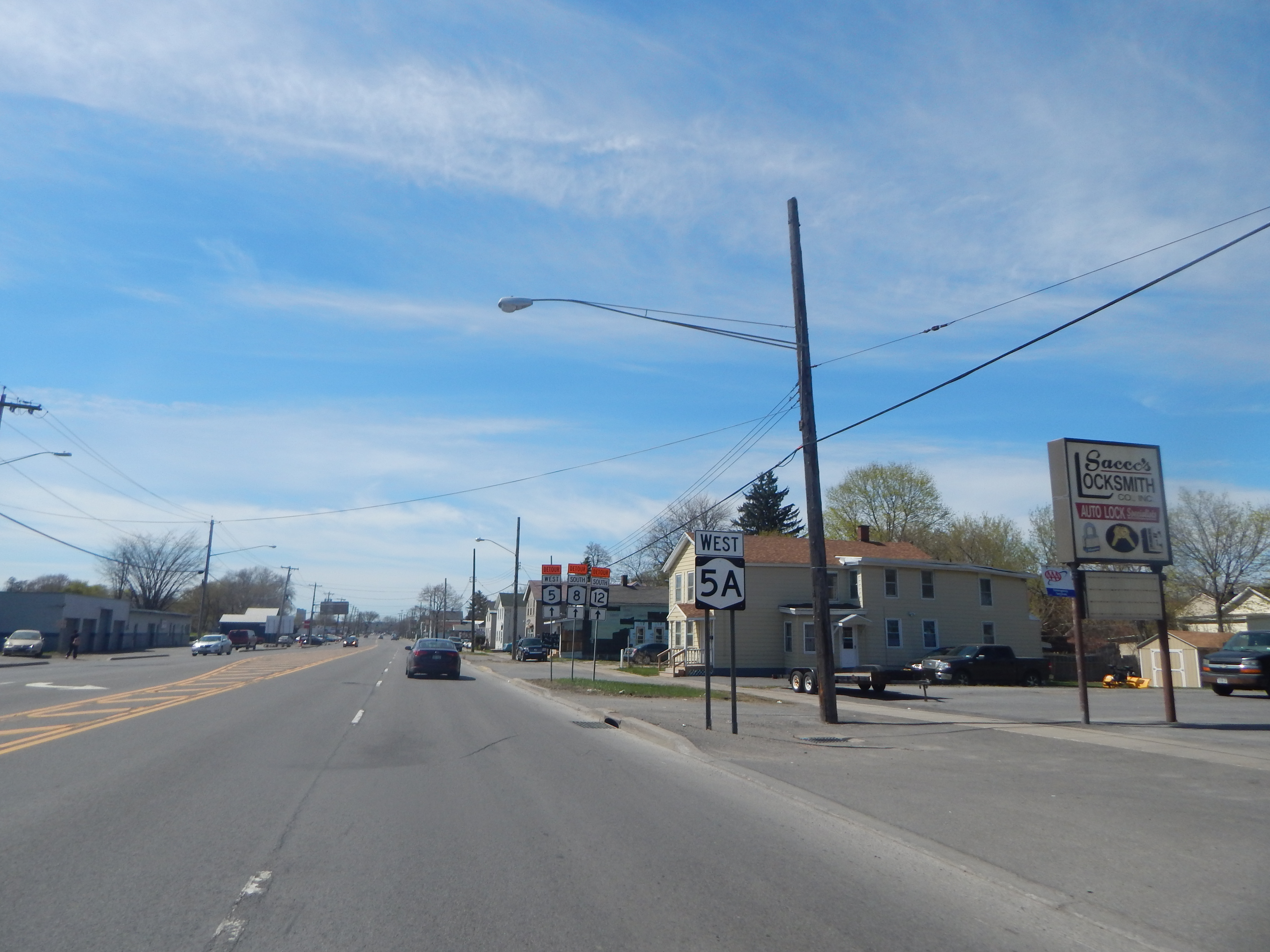
NY 5A heading west through Utica

The route and the creek follow loosely parallel alignments to a point just outside the village limits of both New York Mills and the adjacent village of Yorkville, where NY 5A connects to NY 69 (Oriskany Boulevard) by way of a trumpet interchange. NY 69 ends here while NY 5A merges with the four-lane Oriskany Boulevard and heads east into Yorkville. Here, the route traverses several blocks of businesses and homes before crossing into the city of Utica, at Whitesboro Street (unsigned NY 921W). Within the city limits, NY 5A closely parallels the CSX Transportation-owned Mohawk Subdivision as it heads along the northern fringe of the city. It continues to serve a mix of residential and commercial areas on its way toward downtown Utica, crossing the New York, Susquehanna and Western Railroad to reach an interchange with the North–South Arterial (I-790, NY 5, NY 8, and NY 12). NY 5A becomes NY 5S at the midpoint of the interchange.

== History ==
In 1908, the New York State Legislature created Route 28, an unsigned legislative route extending from Maple View to Utica via Rome and Whitesboro. Route 28 followed the north bank of the Mohawk River from Rome to Marcy, where it turned south toward Whitesboro on modern NY 291. Once on the south bank, the route proceeded to Utica on Main and Whitesboro Streets. When the first set of posted routes in New York were assigned in 1924, all of legislative Route 28 was designated as part of NY 11. Within Utica, NY 11 followed Whitesboro and Court Streets east to Genesee Street, where it ended at NY 5 and NY 12. NY 11 was renumbered to NY 76 in 1927 to eliminate numerical duplication with the new U.S. Route 11.

The NY 76 designation was reassigned elsewhere in the state as part of the 1930 renumbering of state highways in New York. From Whitesboro to downtown Utica, NY 76's former alignment was co-designated as part of NY 5S and NY 12C. In the mid-1930s, a north–south connector between NY 5 in New Hartford and NY 5S and NY 12C in Yorkville was designated as NY 5A. NY 5S and NY 12C were realigned in the late 1930s to follow a new highway named Oriskany Boulevard through Whitesboro and Yorkville. In the early 1940s, NY 5S was truncated to begin in Utica while its former alignment between Rome and Utica became part of NY 69.

By 1947, NY 12C and NY 69 were realigned to follow Oriskany Street through western Utica while NY 5A was extended eastward along Oriskany Street to a new terminus in downtown Utica, creating overlaps with both NY 12C and NY 69. The overlaps remained in place until January 1, 1970, when NY 12C was eliminated and NY 69 was truncated to end in Yorkville. The intersection between Commercial Drive and Oriskany Boulevard was converted into a trumpet interchange around the same time.

== Major intersections ==
The entire route is in Oneida County.

| Location | mi | km | Destinations | Notes |
|---|---|---|---|---|
| New Hartford | 0.00 | 0.00 | NY 5 (Seneca Turnpike) to NY 5B – Clinton, New Hartford, Syracuse | Western terminus |
| New Hartford | 1.00– 1.10 | 1.61– 1.77 | NY 840 | Single-point urban interchange |
| New York Mills–Yorkville village line | 3.18 | 5.12 | NY 69 west (Oriskany Boulevard) – Whitesboro | Trumpet interchange; eastern terminus of NY 69 |
| Yorkville–Utica village/city line | 4.07 | 6.55 | Whitesboro Street (NY 921W) | |
| Utica | 5.59 | 9.00 | I-790 east / NY 5 / NY 8 / NY 12 to I-90 / New York Thruway – New Hartford | Interchange; western terminus of I-790 |
| Utica | 5.59 | 9.00 | NY 5S east – Downtown Utica | Continuation east |
1.000 mi = 1.609 km; 1.000 km = 0.621 mi
