= New York State Route 69 =

State highway in central New York, US

New York State Route 69
- Map of central New York with NY 69 highlighted in red, NY 69A in blue

Route information
- Maintained by NYSDOT
- Length: 57.42 mi (92.41 km)
- Existed: 1930–present

Major junctions
- West end: NY 104 in Mexico
- US 11 in Colosse; I-81 in Parish; NY 13 in Camden; NY 26 / NY 46 / NY 49 / NY 365 in Rome
- East end: NY 5A in Yorkville

Location
- Country: United States
- State: New York
- Counties: Oswego, Oneida

Highway system
- New York Highways; Interstate; US; State; Reference; Parkways
← NY 68	NY 69	→ NY 70

New York State Route 69 (NY 69) is a state highway extending for 57.42 miles (92.41 km) across the central portion of the U.S. state of New York. The western terminus of the route is at NY 104 in the Oswego County village of Mexico. The eastern terminus is at NY 5A in the Oneida County village of Yorkville, just west of Utica. In between, NY 69 serves the city of Rome.

When NY 69 was first assigned in 1930, it stretched only from Colosse to Rome. By the early 1940s, NY 69 was extended to encompass all of its current alignment, as well as what is now NY 5A from Yorkville to Utica. It was reduced to its current length in 1970.

== Route description ==
Route 69 begins at an intersection with Route 104 in the village of Mexico. The route heads southward, intersecting with local roads. The highway enters a region of rural farmland as it progresses to the southeast. After a while, Route 69 enters Colosse, a hamlet of Parish. There, it intersects with U.S. Route 11, which heads northward towards the Canadian border. Route 69 enters the village of Parish, where it intersects with its lone suffixed route, Route 69A. There it also intersects with several county-maintained roads.

In the village of Parish, Route 69 meets Interstate 81 at exit 33. Afterwards, the highway leaves the village and re-enters the town, crossing through more farmlands and lakes. Route 69 intersects with more county roads as it heads eastward towards Amboy Center. Route 69 begins curving to the southeast and enters the Amboy hamlet of Amboy Center, where it intersects with NY 183. Also present in Amboy Center are two county roads. Route 69 continues southeast, this time towards Camden, which is in Oneida County. Route 69 enters Camden, where it becomes concurrent with NY 13 in the center of the village.

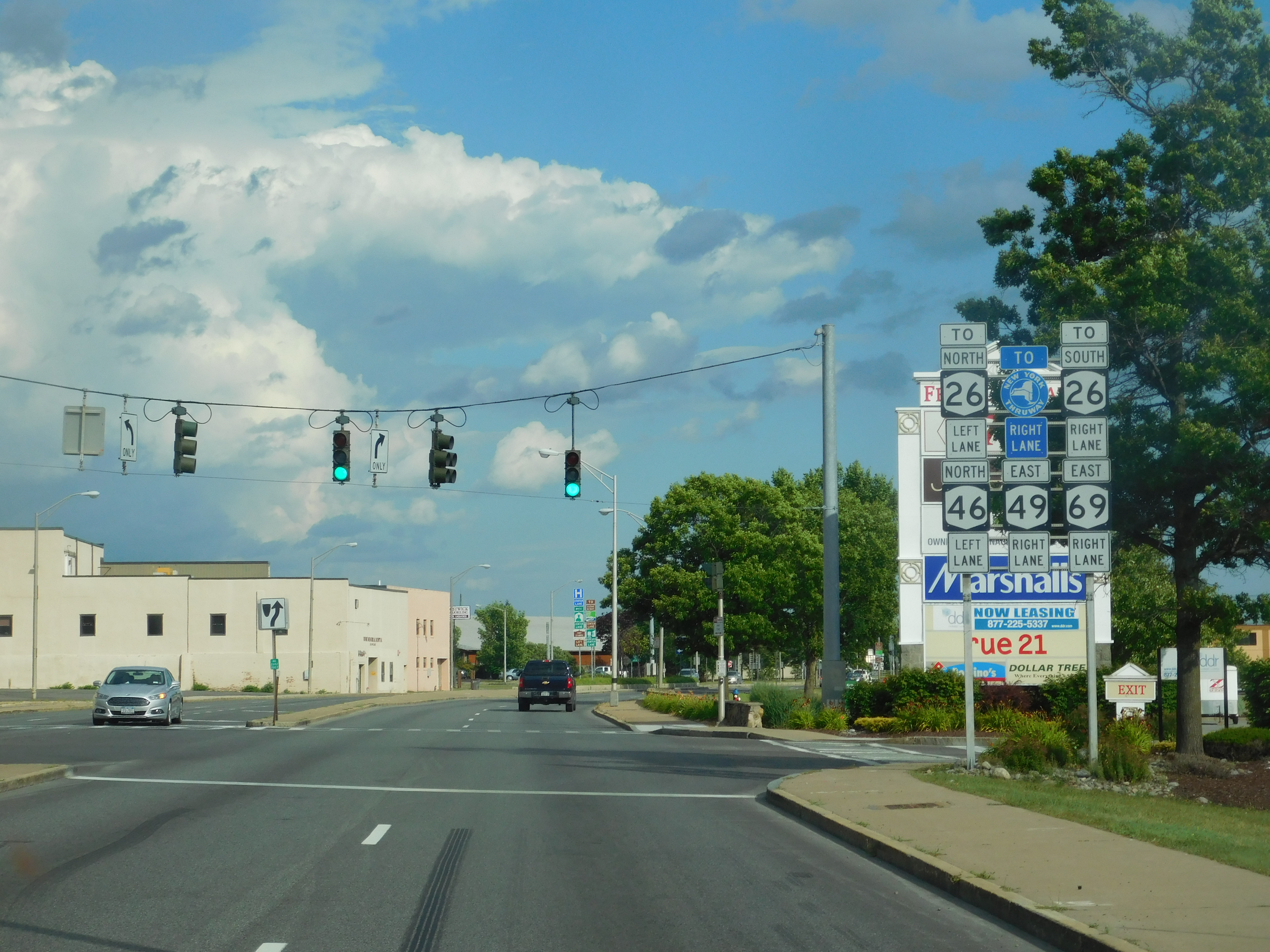
NY 69 and NY 49 approaching the end of the overlap with NY 46 and NY 26

Routes 69 and 13 split, and 69 continues out of downtown Camden. Route 69 enters Annsville and Taberg, where it intersects with a couple of county roads. Route 69 continues to the southeast towards Rome as Rome-Taberg Road. The highway quickly enters Rome and becomes concurrent with Routes 49 and 46 on the southwestern section of the city. The three routes pass to the south of Liberty Gardens, an attraction in Rome. The three routes head southward, intersecting with NY 26, and Route 46 turns off. Routes 49 and 69 head southward and become concurrent with Route 365. Route 69 turns off after a short distance along NY 365 and continues to the southeast as Rome-Oriskany Road.

Route 49 parallels the southeastern moving route to the north away from the city of Rome. Route 69 enters Oriskany, where it intersects with NY 291. The highway heads southward, entering Whitesboro, passing its local fire department memorial park and crossing the New York State Thruway. Route 69 terminates at an interchange with NY 5A in Yorkville.

== History ==
Most of what is now NY 69 was originally designated as part of Route 28, an unsigned legislative route, by the New York State Legislature in 1908. Route 28 began in Utica and followed modern NY 5A and NY 69 to Whitesboro, where it crossed the Mohawk River on current NY 291 and headed west to Rome on River Road (former NY 49). Route 28 rejoined modern NY 69 west of Rome and followed it through Camden to Colosse. Here, Route 28 turned north onto what is now U.S. Route 11 to meet Route 30 (now NY 104) in Maple View. When the first set of posted routes in New York were assigned in 1924, all of legislative Route 28 was designated as part of New York State Route 11, an east–west highway extending from Oswego to Utica. From Oswego to Colosse, NY 11 overlapped with NY 2 and NY 3 (now US 11 and NY 104, respectively). The route was truncated to NY 2 in Colosse on its western end by 1926.

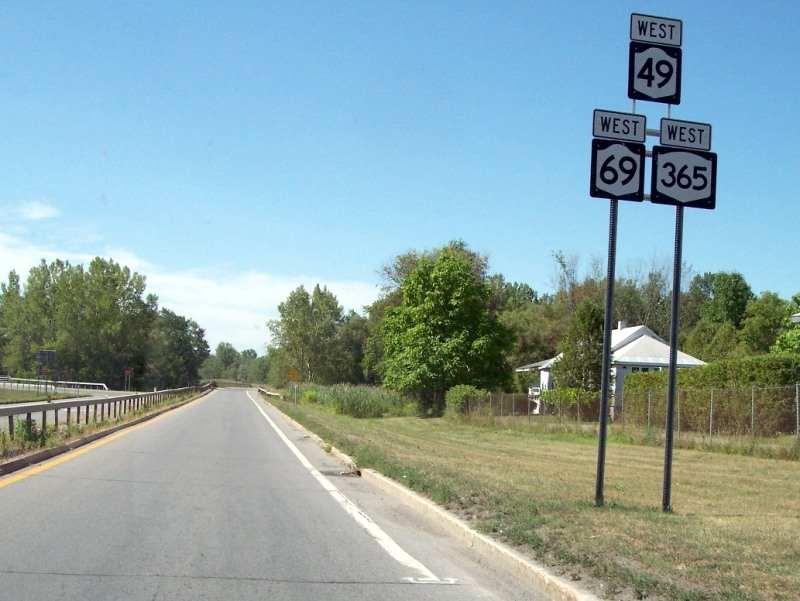
Signage for NY 49, NY 69, and NY 365 on the westbound on-ramp leading to the Utica–Rome Expressway

In 1927, the entirety of NY 2 was redesignated as part of the new U.S. Route 11. To eliminate duplication, all of NY 11 was renumbered to New York State Route 76. This route remained intact up to the 1930 renumbering of state highways in New York when NY 76 was split into several routes. East of Rome, the former routing of NY 76 became an eastward extension of NY 49 from Rome to Marcy. Between Marcy and Utica, old NY 76 was incorporated into the new NY 12C. West of Rome, old NY 76 was renumbered to NY 69. At the time, modern NY 69 from Mexico to Colosse was unnumbered while the portion of current NY 69 between Rome and Utica was part of NY 5S, an alternate route of NY 5 assigned as part of the renumbering. From Whitesboro to Utica, NY 5S and NY 12C were concurrent.

NY 69 was extended a short distance westward to its present western terminus at then-U.S. Route 104 (now NY 104) in Mexico c. 1940. It was extended eastward in the early 1940s when NY 5S was truncated to its present western terminus in downtown Utica. The former routing of NY 5S from Rome to Genesee Street in downtown Utica became part of NY 69. East of Whitesboro, NY 69 overlapped NY 12C; east of Yorkville, NY 69 also overlapped NY 5A. The overlaps between NY 5A, NY 12C, and NY 69 in Utica were eliminated on January 1, 1970, when NY 69 was truncated to its current eastern terminus in Yorkville and the NY 12C designation was eliminated.

== Major intersections ==
County	Location	mi	km	Destinations	Notes
Oswego	Village of Mexico	0.00	0.00	NY 104 (Main Street) – Oswego	Western terminus
Oswego	Town of Mexico	4.89	7.87	US 11 – Pulaski, Central Square	Hamlet of Colosse
Oswego	Village of Parish	6.78	10.91	NY 69A south (South Railroad Street)	Northern terminus of NY 69A
Oswego	Village of Parish	7.33	11.80	I-81 – Syracuse, Watertown	Exit 114 (I-81); parclo interchange
Oswego	Amboy	16.87	27.15	NY 183 north – Williamstown	Southern terminus of NY 183; hamlet of Amboy Center
Oneida	Village of Camden	27.11	43.63	NY 13 south (Main Street)	Southern terminus of NY 13 / NY 69 overlap
Oneida	Village of Camden	27.21	43.79	NY 13 north (Main Street) – Pulaski, County Sheriff	Northern terminus of NY 13 / NY 69 overlap
Oneida	Rome	42.82	68.91	NY 46 south / NY 49 west (Rome-New London Road) – Oneida	Western terminus of NY 46 / NY 69 and NY 49 / NY 69 overlaps
Oneida	Rome	45.12	72.61	NY 26 north / NY 46 north (Black River Boulevard) – Delta Lake State Park, MVCC	Eastern terminus of NY 46 / NY 69 overlap; northern terminus of NY 26 / NY 69 overlap
Oneida	Rome	46.13	74.24	NY 26 south / NY 365 west to I-90 west / New York Thruway west – Oneida	Southern terminus of NY 26 / NY 69 overlap
Oneida	Rome	46.65	75.08	NY 365 east	Western terminus of NY 69 / NY 365 overlap
Oneida	Rome	46.97	75.59	NY 49 east / NY 365 east	Eastern terminus of NY 49 / NY 69 and NY 69 / NY 365 overlaps
Oneida	Rome	47.22	75.99	NY 233 to I-90 / New York Thruway	NY 69 westbound overlaps NY 233 northbound to reach NY 49 / NY 365
Oneida	Oriskany	53.23	85.67	River Street ( NY 922E north)	Southern terminus of NY 922E
Oneida	Town of Whitestown	55.37	89.11	NY 291 north – Stittville	Southern terminus of NY 291
Oneida	Whitesboro	56.78	91.38	Mohawk Street ( NY 922A north)	Southern terminus of NY 922A
Oneida	Yorkville–New York Mills village line	57.42	92.41	NY 5A (Commercial Drive / Oriskany Boulevard) – Utica	Eastern terminus; trumpet interchange
1.000 mi = 1.609 km; 1.000 km = 0.621 mi: Concurrency terminus

== NY 69A ==
New York State Route 69A
- Location: Hastings–Parish
- Length: 2.04 mi (3.28 km)

NY 69A is a 2.04-mile-long (3.28 km) spur connecting NY 69 to the hamlet of Hastings in Oswego County. The two-lane route begins at US 11 in Hastings and heads northeast to Parish, where it ends at NY 69. It was assigned c. 1931.
