= New York State Route 840 =

State highway in Oneida County, New York, US

New York State Route 840
- NY 840 highlighted in red

Route information
- Maintained by NYSDOT
- Length: 4.02 mi (6.47 km)
- Existed: June 29, 2005–present

Major junctions
- West end: CR 52 / CR 840 in Whitestown
- NY 5A in New Hartford
- East end: NY 5 / NY 8 / NY 12 in Utica

Location
- Country: United States
- State: New York
- Counties: Oneida

Highway system
- New York Highways; Interstate; US; State; Reference; Parkways
← NY 825	→ NY 878

New York State Route 840 (NY 840) is an east–west expressway located entirely within Oneida County, New York, in the United States. It is a 4.02-mile (6.47 km) superhighway extension of Judd Road (County Route 840 or CR 840), which ends at Halsey Road (County Route 52 or CR 52) in Whitestown. The western terminus of NY 840 is at the junction of Judd and Halsey roads while its eastern terminus is at an interchange with the North–South Arterial (NY 5, NY 8, and NY 12) near the southern city line of Utica. NY 840 opened to traffic in 2005, and the road was ceremoniously designated as the Officer Joseph D. Corr Memorial Highway in 2007. In 2008, part of Judd Road was redesignated as CR 840 to match the designation of its state highway continuation.

== Route description ==
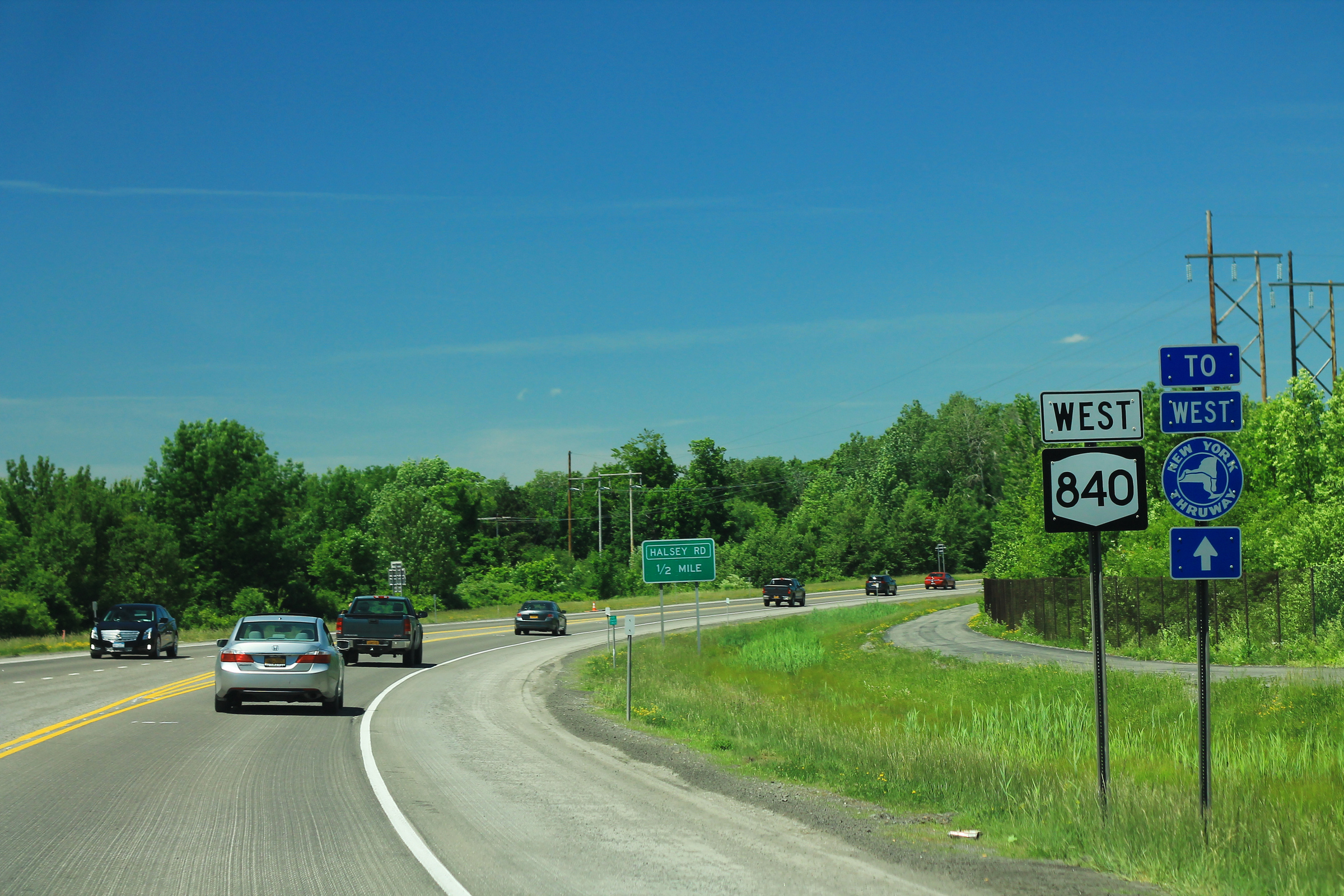
NY 840 westbound approaching Halsey Road

NY 840 begins at an intersection with Halsey Road (CR 52) and Judd Road in the town of Whitestown. North of this junction, NY 840 continues as Judd Road, designated as CR 840. NY 840 initially heads south as a two-lane expressway through a rural portion of Oneida County to an at-grade intersection with Clark Mills Road (CR 19), where it becomes a two-lane freeway and turns southeast to parallel a set of high-voltage power lines through the town. Upon crossing into the town of New Hartford, NY 840 becomes a two-lane divided freeway and turns again to follow a more easterly routing.

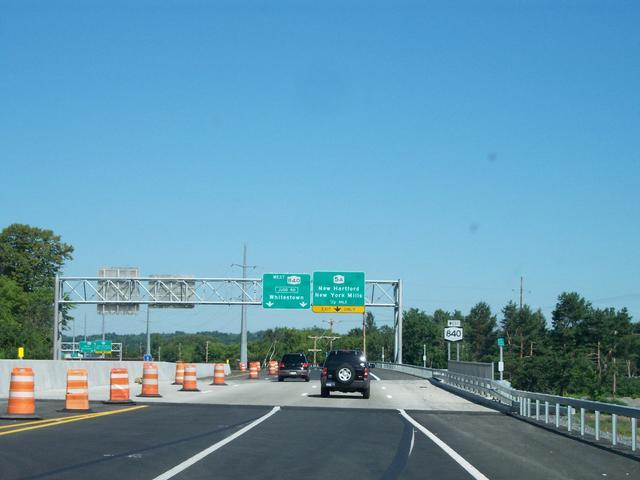
Approaching NY 5A on NY 840 westbound

As NY 840 approaches the residential outskirts of Utica, it becomes a four-lane freeway and connects to Middle Settlement Road (CR 30) by way of a partial cloverleaf interchange. East of the junction, the route curves southeastward and enters a major commercial district, where it intersects NY 5A by way of a single-point urban interchange. The district is confined mostly to the vicinity of NY 5A, however, and NY 840 proceeds southeast through residential neighborhoods and around pockets of commercial development to a cloverleaf interchange with the North–South Arterial (NY 5, NY 8, and NY 12) near the southern city line of Utica. NY 840 ends here; however, the highway continues southeast through the interchange as NY 8.

Although NY 840 is signed as an east–west route, the reference markers along NY 840 are sequenced from the arterial concurrency northward, ending at the Halsey Road intersection, in violation of standard New York State Department of Transportation (NYSDOT) practice. NYSDOT also lists the mileposts along the route from east to west in its annual Traffic Volume Report, implying a north–south orientation; however, NY 840 is listed as an east–west route in the NYSDOT route log, listing its beginning terminus at CR 40 (Judd Road, now CR 840).

== History ==
The first section of NY 840 opened to traffic on June 29, 2005, extending from the North–South Arterial to Middle Settlement Road. The remainder of the highway opened on October 3, 2005. In all, the project cost $45 million, including $33 million for the road itself. In April 2007, a bill was introduced in the New York State Senate that would ceremoniously designate NY 840 as the "Officer Joseph D. Corr Memorial Highway". It was passed by both houses of the New York State Legislature and signed into law by Governor Eliot Spitzer on July 18, 2007.

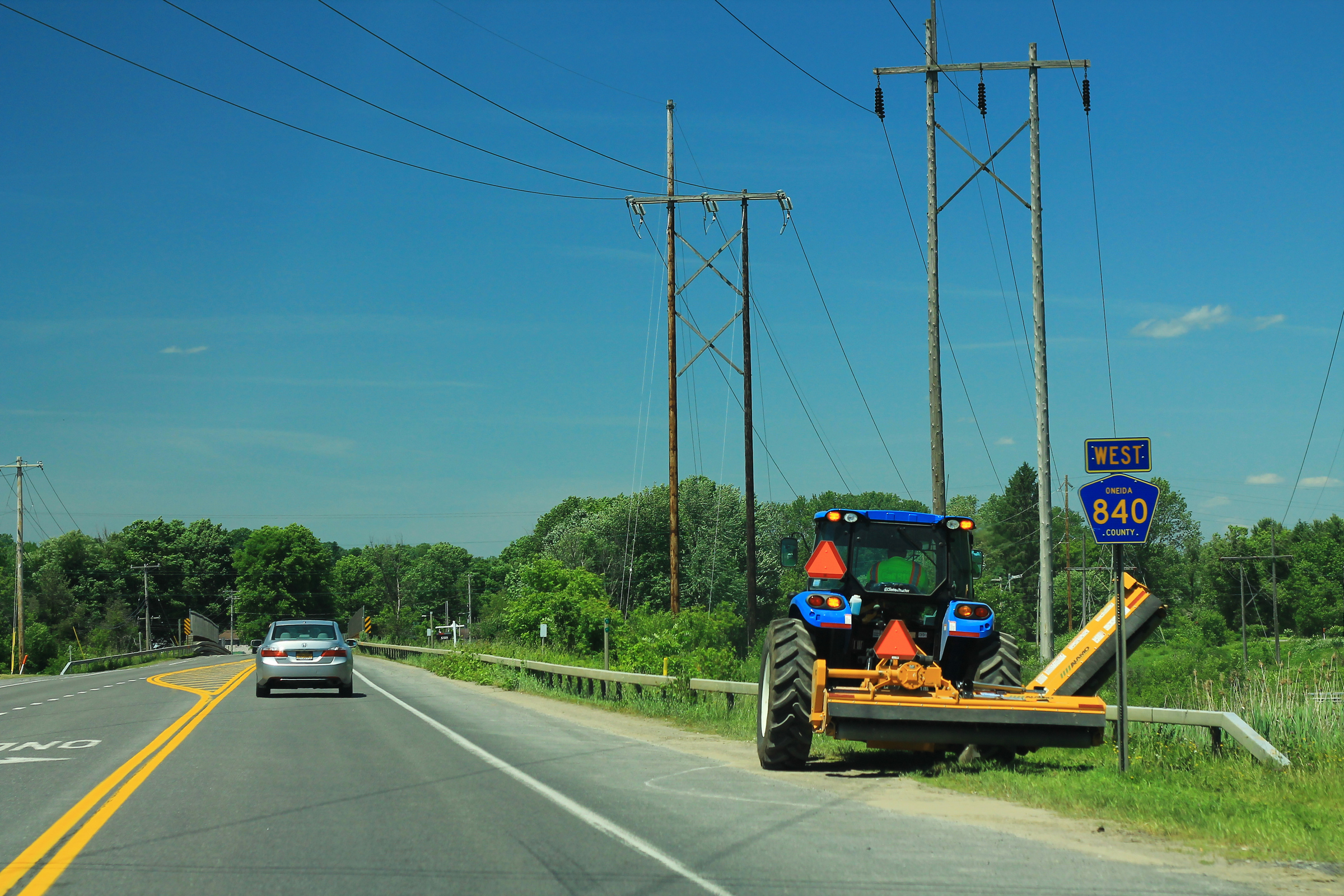
CR 840 sign

NY 840 is commonly known as Judd Road Extension in reference to Judd Road, the county-maintained road it connects to at its western end. Judd Road and Coleman Mills Road, the continuation of Judd Road north of the former Oneida County Airport, were initially designated as CR 40. Meanwhile, Sutliff Road, a road branching off of Coleman Mills Road near the airport, was originally CR 90. In September 2008, legislation was introduced in Oneida County that would redesignate the portion of Judd and Coleman Mills roads from Halsey Road to Sutliff Road and all of Sutliff Road as CR 840. The changes were proposed in an effort to bring the highways, which connect NY 840 to NY 233, under one designation that would serve as a clear continuation of NY 840 through northwest Whitestown. The redesignation was approved by the county legislature on September 24, 2008.

=== Future ===
According to the Herkimer-Oneida County Long Range Transportation Plan Update, NY 840 is slated to extend from its current terminus at Halsey Road in Whitestown to the interchanges of New York State Route 49 and New York State Route 365 in Rome. Options presented in the study include realigning the highway on a new right-of-way or constructing the highway in its existing alignment with new frontage roads. The project is estimated to cost $10 million.

== Exit list ==
The entire route is in Oneida County. All exits are unnumbered.

Location	mi	km	Destinations	Notes
Whitestown	0.00	0.00	CR 840 west (Judd Road) to I-90 west / New York Thruway west	Western terminus; at-grade intersection; access to I-90 via CR 52
Whitestown	0.50	0.80	CR 19 (Clark Mills Road)	At-grade intersection
Whitestown	0.50	0.80	Western end of freeway section	
Town of New Hartford			Woods Park Drive	Eastbound exit and entrance
Town of New Hartford	2.35	3.78	CR 30 (Middle Settlement Road) / Clinton Street	Clinton Street signed as Clinton Road; parclo interchange
Town of New Hartford	2.88	4.63	NY 5A – New Hartford, New York Mills	Single-point urban interchange
Utica			NY 5 / NY 8 north / NY 12 to I-90 / New York Thruway – Binghamton, Syracuse, Utica	Eastbound exit and westbound entrance; cloverleaf interchange
Utica	4.02	6.47	NY 8 south – Bridgewater	Eastern terminus
1.000 mi = 1.609 km; 1.000 km = 0.621 mi: Incomplete access

== See also ==
- List of county routes in Oneida County, New York
