= New York State Route 12 =

New York state highway

New York State Route 12
- NY 12 highlighted in red and NY 12A in blue

Route information
- Maintained by NYSDOT and the city of Watertown
- Length: 222.27 mi (357.71 km)
- Existed: 1924–present
- Tourist routes: Great Lakes Seaway Trail

Major junctions
- South end: US 11 in Chenango
- NY 12A in Chenango; NY 23 in Norwich; NY 80 in Sherburne; NY 12B in Sherburne; US 20 in Sangerfield; I-790 / NY 5 / NY 8 / NY 5S / NY 49 / NY 840 in Utica; NY 28 in Trenton/Alder Creek; US 11 / NY 3 in Watertown; I-81 in Orleans
- North end: NY 37 in Morristown

Location
- Country: United States
- State: New York
- Counties: Broome, Chenango, Madison, Oneida, Lewis, Jefferson, St. Lawrence

Highway system
- New York Highways; Interstate; US; State; Reference; Parkways
← NY 11C	→ NY 12B

New York State Route 12 (NY 12) is a state highway extending for 222.27 miles (357.71 km) through central and northern New York in the United States. The southern terminus of the route is at U.S. Route 11 (US 11) in the town of Chenango (just north of Binghamton) in the Southern Tier. The northern terminus is at NY 37 near the village of Morristown in the North Country. In between, the route serves three cities of varying size: Norwich, Utica, and Watertown. NY 12 intersects several primary routes, including US 20 in Sangerfield, New York State Thruway via Interstate 790 (I-790) in Utica, overlaps NY 28 from Barneveld to the town of Remsen, NY 3 in Watertown, and I-81 in Pamelia and Orleans.

It is a two lane, undivided, full access roadway for the majority of its length, except between the village of New Hartford and Alder Creek, where it is a four-lane highway. Within that span, it is a limited access highway in the city of Utica, referred locally as The Arterial and the North–South Arterial. The distance between Utica and Binghamton is a major trucking route, and features many gas stations, truck stops, and fast food restaurants. Between Boonville and Lowville, it follows the Black River Valley. Then further north, between Watertown and Morristown, it follows the St. Lawrence River valley.

NY 12, as originally assigned in 1924, extended from Chenango in the south to Clayton in the north. It was extended east over the former routing of NY 3 to Alexandria Bay in 1930, then along a new roadway to Morristown in the 1960s. Parts of NY 12 have been rerouted onto new roadways in areas, primarily in Oneida County.

== Route description ==
=== Broome and Chenango counties ===
NY 12 begins at US 11, which connects it to I-81, north of Binghamton in the Broome County town of Chenango. The route heads north through the Chenango River valley, connecting to I-88 (via NY 12A), and passing west of Chenango Valley State Park before traversing the Tioughnioga River near the community of Chenango Forks. On the northern bank of the river, NY 12 intersects and briefly overlaps NY 79 before continuing northward through the valley and into Chenango County.

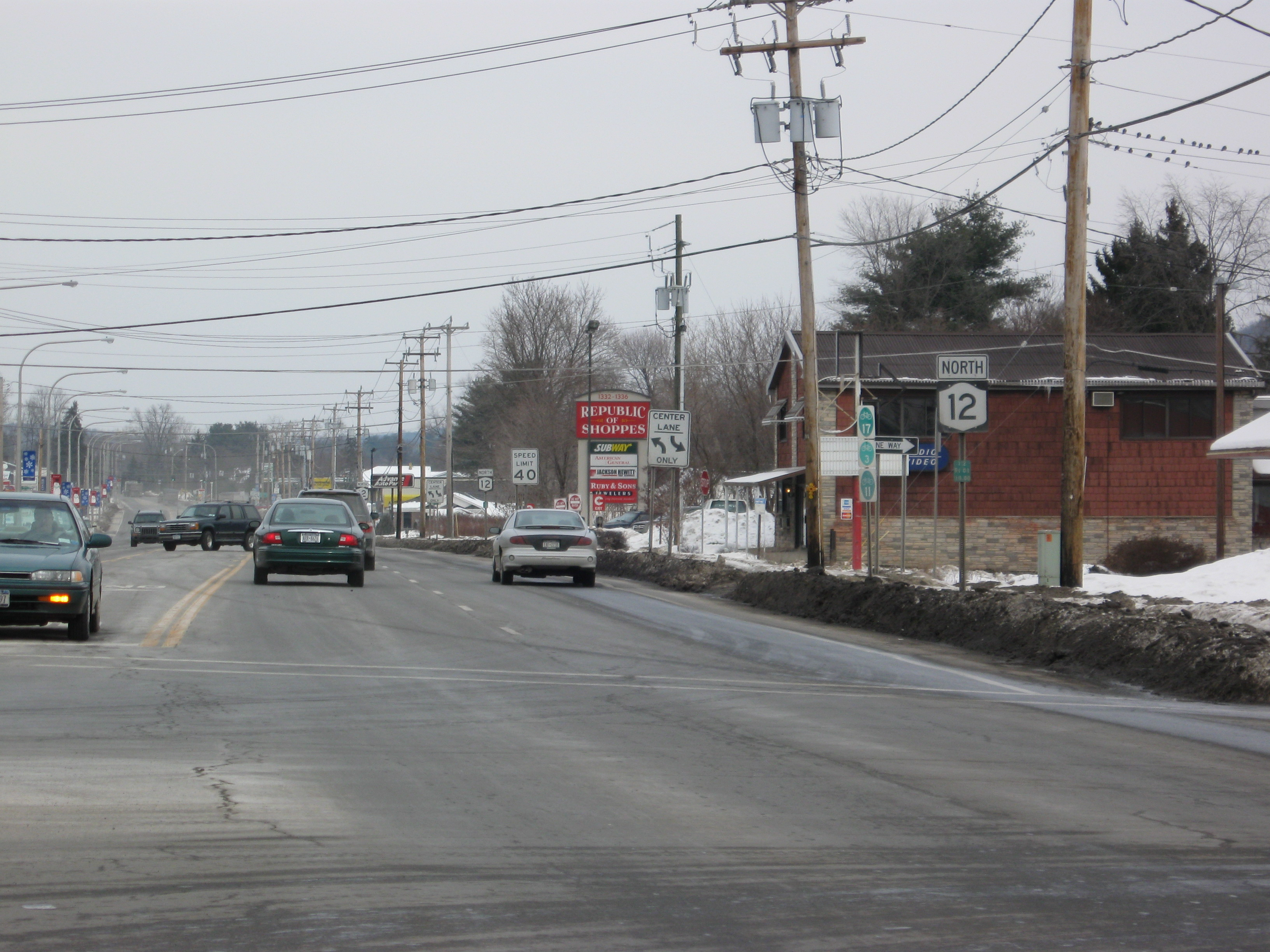
NY 12 begins its 200+ mile journey here at US 11 just north of Binghamton in Chenango.

Within Chenango County, NY 12 acts as the primary connector between the numerous communities located along the Chenango. In Greene, NY 12 intersects NY 206 and overlaps NY 41 for six blocks through the village before continuing northeast for twelve miles (19 km) to Oxford, where it intersects the eastern terminus of NY 220. After another six miles (9.7 km), NY 12 enters the city of Norwich, becomes South Broad Street, and then intersects the western terminus of NY 990L (East Main Street). The South Broad moniker remains with the route northward through the city until the downtown district, where NY 12 turns into North Broad Street at a junction with NY 23. NY 12 loses the street name soon afterward as it leaves the city and intersects the western terminus of NY 320 north of Norwich and south of Norwich Lt. Warren Eaton Airport.

The route and the Chenango River remain in close proximity to one another up through the village of Sherburne, where NY 12 intersects NY 80. North of the village center, the river breaks to the west, following NY 12B to the northwest while NY 12 continues northward into rural Madison County.

=== Madison and Oneida counties ===
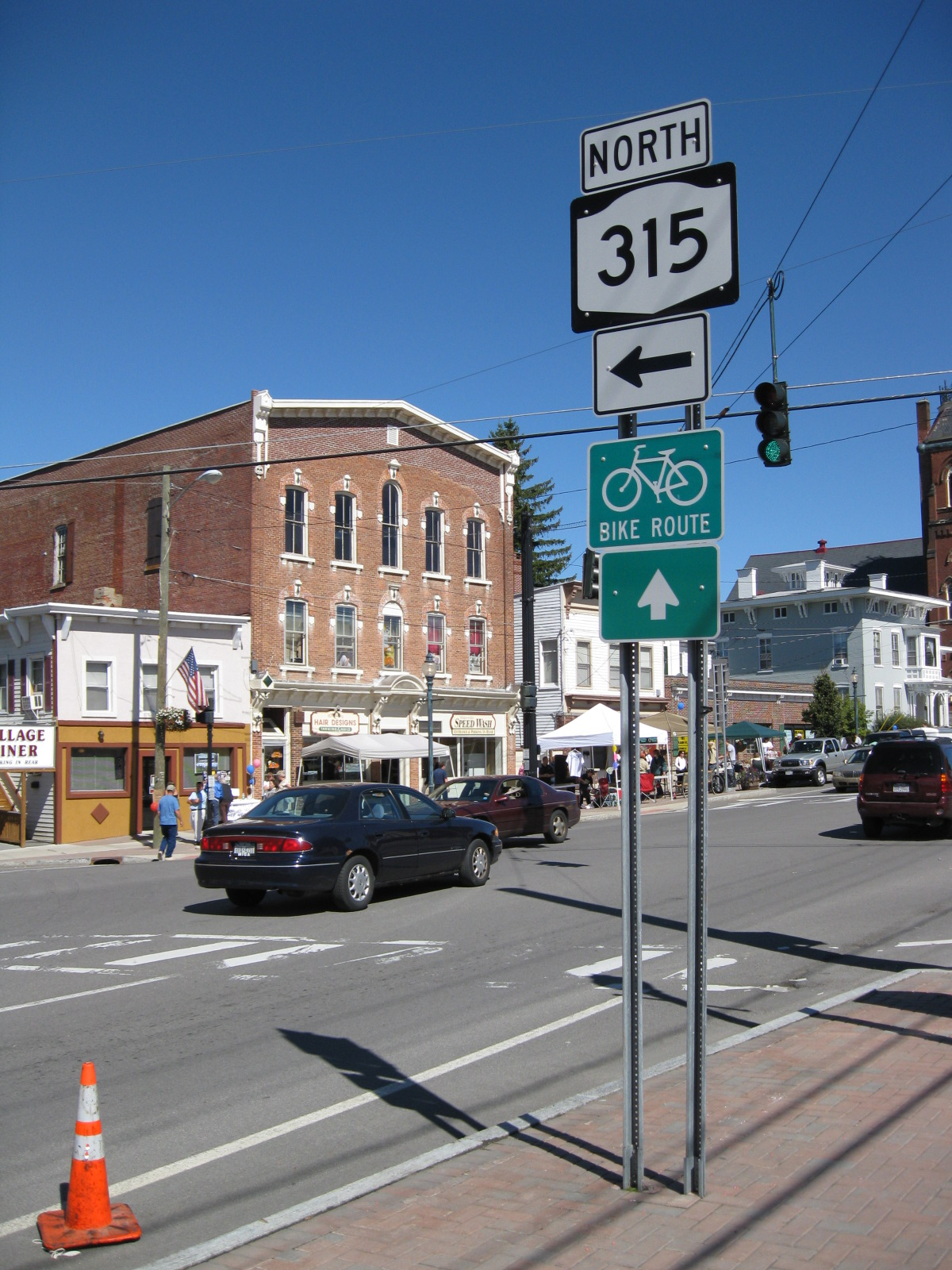
NY 12 north at NY 315 in Waterville

Across the county line, NY 12 joins the Sangerfield River as it heads north through the narrow southeastern portion of the county. Near the northern border of Madison County, the route shifts slightly east to bypass a marshy area around the Sangerfield River known as the Ninemile Swamp. The conditions persist into Oneida County to just south of the Sangerfield hamlet of the same name, where the swamp ends as the river curves away from NY 12. At the actual community, NY 12 intersects US 20.

The route continues north for an additional one mile (1.6 km) to the village of Waterville, home to an intersection between NY 12 and NY 315. Outside of Waterville, NY 12 heads north once more through hilly, sparsely populated areas of New York toward Utica. In the Utica suburb of New Hartford, the route intersects Genesee Street (unsigned NY 921E), then NY 5 a short distance east of where NY 12B terminates at NY 5. NY 12 turns east, joining NY 5 northeast on a limited-access highway known locally as the North–South Arterial. Upon crossing into the Utica city limits, the Arterial intersects NY 8 and NY 840 by way of a cloverleaf interchange. NY 8 joins the freeway here, following NY 5 and NY 12 through southern Utica as the arterial meets French Road (unsigned NY 921W) and then Burrstone Road (unsigned NY 921B) by way of a pair of interchanges. After the Burrstone Road interchange, the arterial becomes a divided highway through downtown before becoming limited-access once more just past Noyes Street. After a short distance the highway intersects Court Street via a single point urban interchange then Oriskany Street (NY 5A and NY 5S).

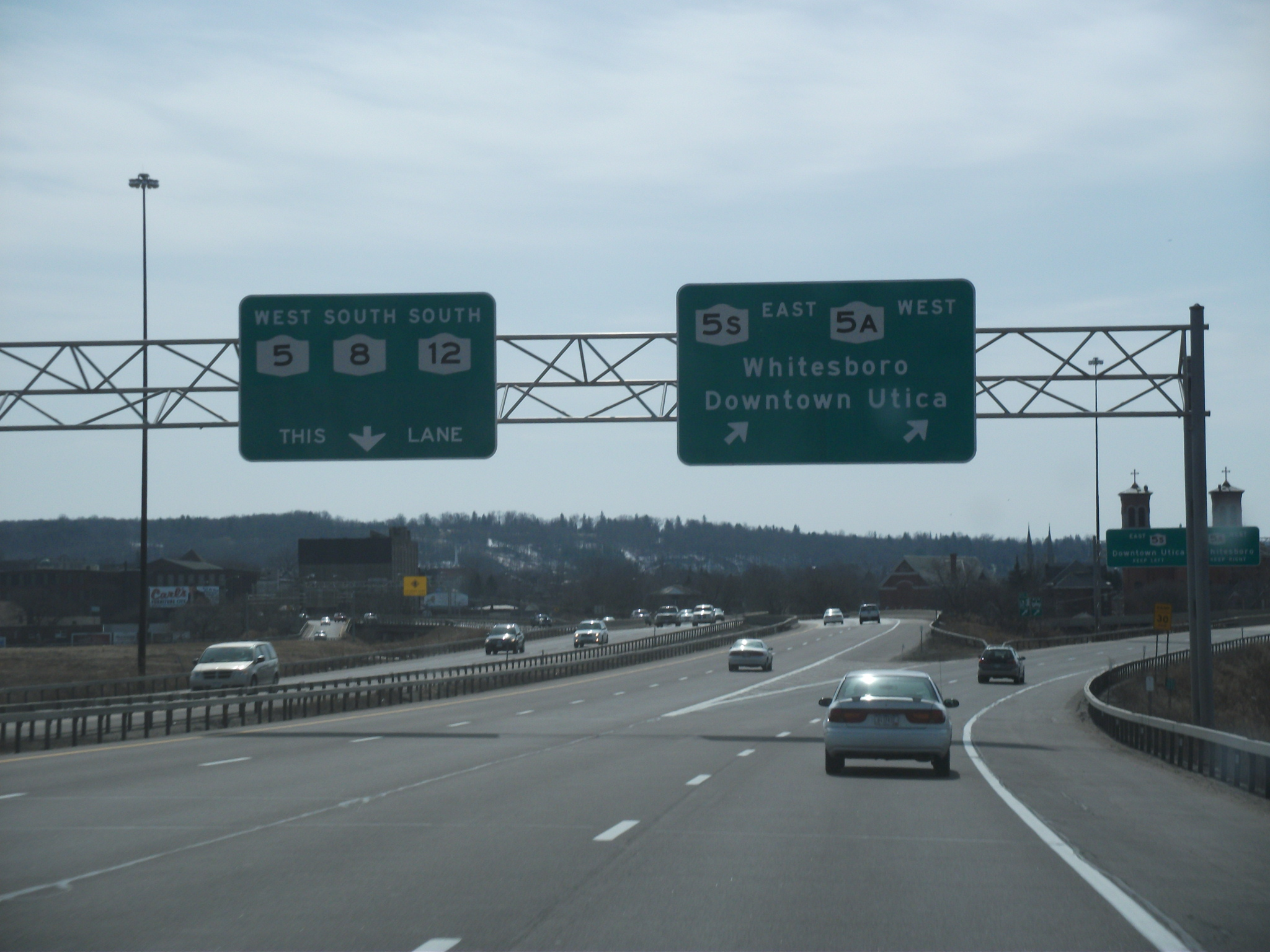
NY 12, 5 and 8 at the interchange with NY 5A and NY 5S

Between Oriskany Street and the New York State Thruway (I-90), NY 5, 8, and 12 is part of the Interstate Highway System as I-790 overlaps all three routes northward over the Mohawk River and the Erie Canal before leaving the arterial at a large interchange on the north bank of the canal. NY 5 turns off as well, following I-790 eastward. Meanwhile, NY 8 and NY 12 interchange with NY 49 (the Utica–Rome Expressway), partially via the I-790 exit ramps, and passes over the Thruway before continuing northward out of the city limits.

NY 8 and NY 12 remain limited-access as they proceed through the northern suburbs of Utica, connecting to Mulaney Road and Trenton Road via interchanges in Deerfield. Farther north in the town, NY 8 leaves the freeway by way of a trumpet interchange. Although the amount of development around NY 12 declines as it heads northward, it continues as an expressway to a point north of the Putnam Road interchange in Trenton, where the road reverts to a limited-access four-lane highway. This configuration remains through the villages of Barneveld, where NY 28 joins NY 12 south of the village, then intersects Mappa Avenue (unsigned NY 921D) in the village. From here NY 12 and NY 28 continues northward for a short distance and then connects to NY 365 via an interchange. From NY 365, it continues northward and intersects Steuben Street (unsigned NY 920V), the former NY 28B, east of the village of Remsen. From here NY 12 and NY 28 continue northward to the vicinity of Alder Creek in the town of Boonville, where NY 28 leaves NY 12 via a partial trumpet interchange and the road narrows to two lanes shortly afterward.

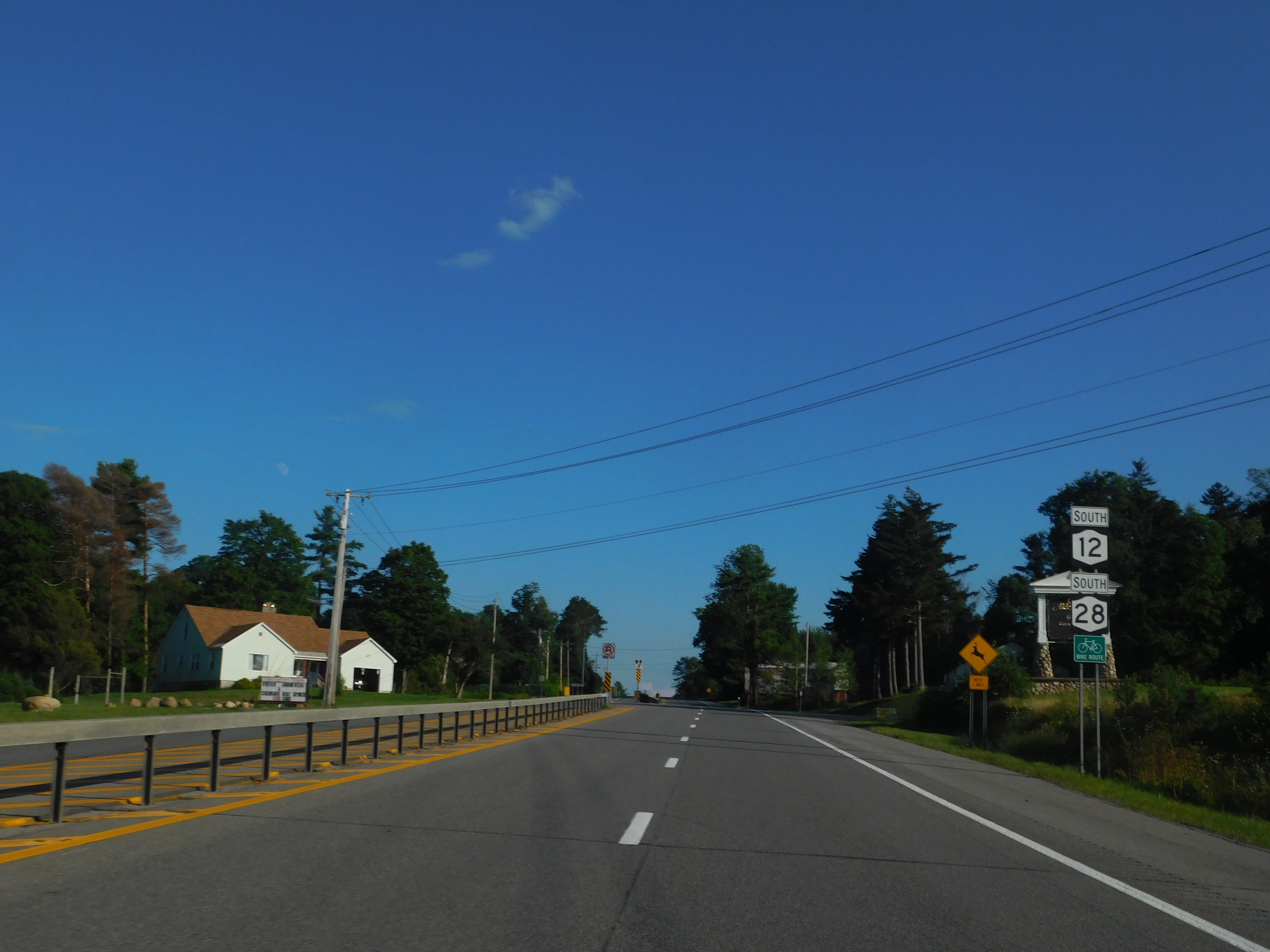
NY 12 and 28 in Remsen village

From Alder Creek to Boonville, NY 12 loosely follows the path of the Black River as it heads northwest. Inside Boonville, NY 12D departs NY 12 and begins to follow a northward routing parallel to that of its parent. Together with NY 12D and the Black River, NY 12 passes into the region of New York known as the North Country.

=== North Country ===
The path of NY 12 through New York's North Country consists of three primary subregions: rural Lewis County, urban Watertown, and the numerous communities that line the southern bank of the St. Lawrence River, here the geographical divide between the United States and Canada.

==== Lewis County ====
NY 12, NY 12D, and the Black River continue to follow parallel routings north through the village of Port Leyden to Lyons Falls, where NY 12D returns to NY 12 just west of the village. Heading north NY 12 passes under NY 12D. Whereas NY 12D heads northeast from NY 12 on Cherry Street to access Lyons Falls before heading west over NY 12 and out of the village. NY 12 continues north along the vicinity of the Black River to Lowville, where NY 12 briefly overlaps NY 26 and meets NY 812 before leaving both the village and the river to the west.

Roughly three miles (4.8 km) outside Lowville, at West Lowville, NY 12 leaves its due west alignment and curves to the northwest, with the westerly alignment continuing onward as NY 177. From here to the area surrounding Copenhagen, NY 12 passes through largely undeveloped terrain, save for a pair of isolated roadside communities. This trend ceases, albeit temporary, in the village of Copenhagen, located on the banks of the Deer River at the crossroads of NY 12 and the former NY 194 (now County Route 194 or CR 194). Outside the limits, the route resumes its trek through the rural North Country.

==== Watertown area ====
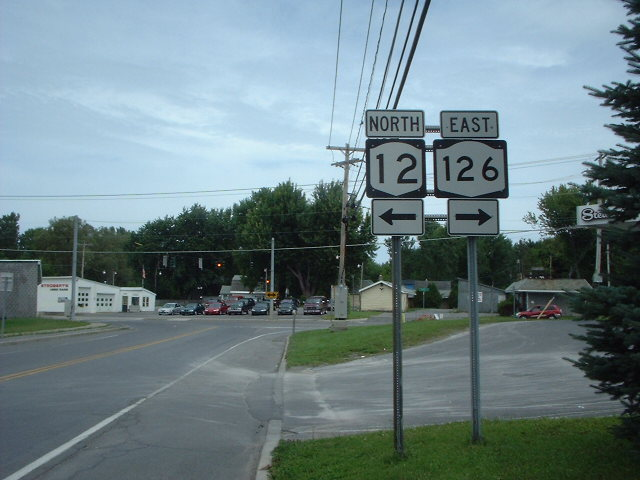
Approaching NY 126 on NY 12 northbound

NY 12 enters Jefferson County on its way to Watertown just north of Copenhagen. NY 12 is known as Van Allen Road, crossing with Jefferson county roads in Rutland. At the intersection with CR 67, NY 12 turns to the north and enters Watertown as Gifford Street. NY 12 intersects with NY 126 just northeast of Thompson Park and Watertown Golf Club and turns to the northwest. As NY 12 continues through southern parts of Watertown, NY 3 intersects and becomes concurrent. NY 3 and NY 12 enter Watertown Public Square and split into divided highways. Here, NY 283 starts to the northeast. The eastern terminus of NY 12F is accessed via NY 12 southbound.

NY 3 and NY 12 split, just northwest of the Public Square. NY 3 splits to the west, NY 12 heads to the northwest, and quickly becomes concurrent with US 11. The two roads cross a river and split in different directions. NY 12 heads to the northeast, intersecting with a suffixed route, NY 12E, and passes North Watertown Cemetery before connecting to I-81 at exit 47. NY 12 leaves Watertown afterwards and heads northeast through rural northwestern Jefferson County, along the way intersecting the western terminus of NY 342. North of Perch Lake in the southeastern corner of the town of Clayton, NY 12 intersects NY 180. From here, NY 12 continues approximately ten miles (16 km) north and reaches the village of Clayton on the St. Lawrence River. On the south side of the village NY 12 intersects NY 12E and James Street (unsigned NY 970L), a loop through the village of Clayton. From here NY 12 turns east, intersects Webb Street (other end of unsigned 970L), then continues following State Street out of Clayton.

==== St. Lawrence River ====
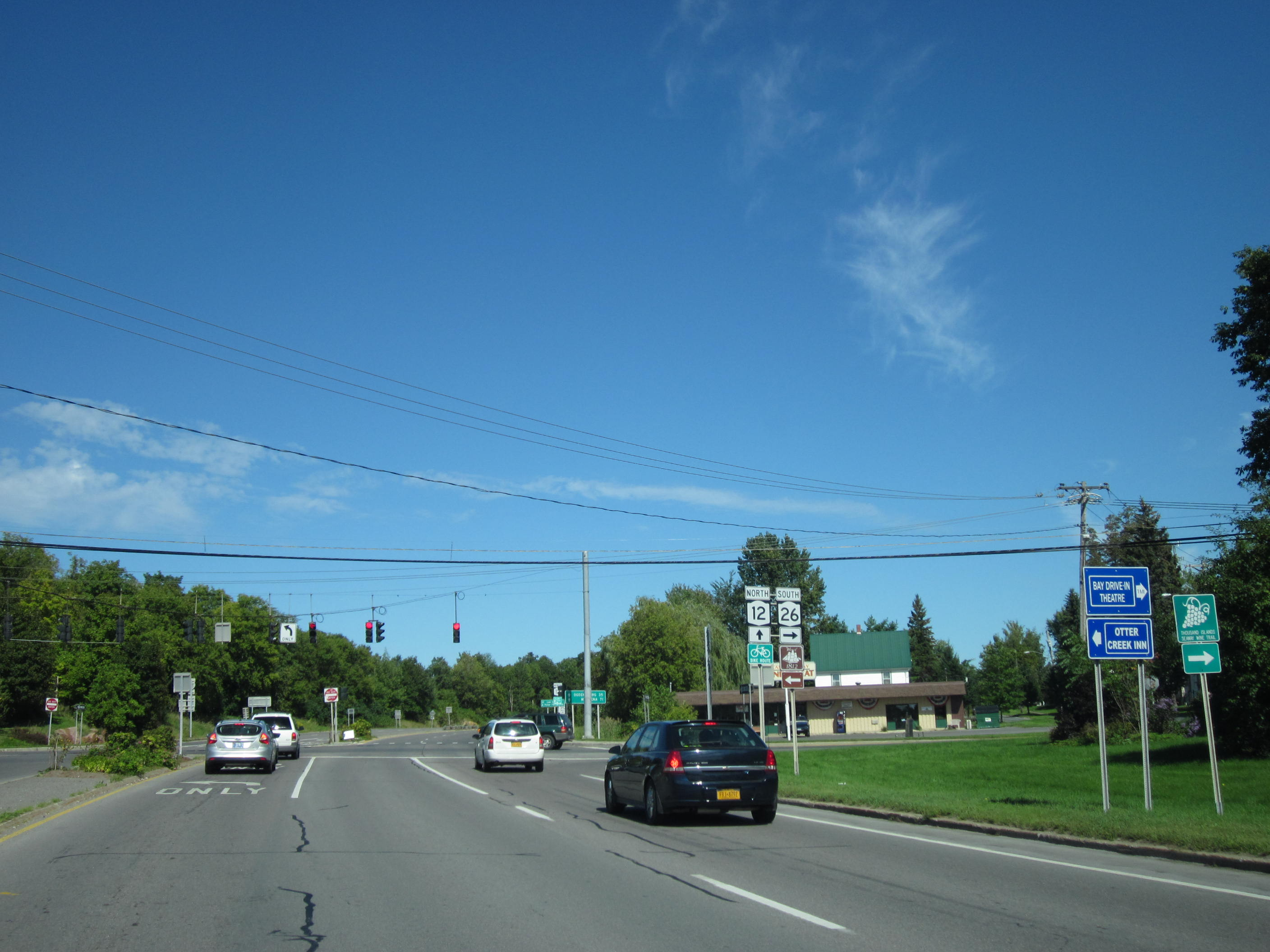
NY 12 at NY 26's northern terminus

NY 12 continues northeast along the south bank of the St. Lawrence, intersecting Mason Point Road (a local road leading to a Thousand Islands-bound ferry) and NY 180, and passing south of Grass Point State Park prior to encountering I-81, at exit 50, four miles (6.4 km) southwest of the village of Alexandria Bay. Farther northeast, NY 12 passes by Keewaydin State Park before intersecting the northern terminus of NY 26 and Church Street (unsigned NY 971K) in the southwestern portion of the village. The latter was a former northern extension of NY 26.

Outside of Alexandria Bay, NY 12 temporarily turns east and leaves the riverbank to avoid Goose Bay, a small body of water partially separated from the St. Lawrence by two protruding points of land. The route then curves back toward the water and follows the eastern length of the bay, serving the seaside hamlet of Goose Bay near the bay's midpoint. North of Goose Bay, NY 12 intersects Kring Point Road, an access road leading to Kring Point State Park, and crosses into St. Lawrence County. NY 12 continues along the southern bank of the St. Lawrence River as it proceeds through the rural western portion of the county. In the town of Hammond, five miles (8.0 km) past the county line, NY 12 intersects CR 6, a roadway leading east to the village of Hammond and Black Lake. Farther north in Morristown, NY 12 travels through Jacques Cartier State Park before terminating at an interchange with NY 37 just south of the Morristown village limits.

== History ==
=== Origins ===
A section of the highway north of Utica was created as the Utica Turnpike. The company that built the turnpike was chartered in 1805 to build a road from the town of Deerfield to the town of Steuben. The road was opened in part in 1811, and was fully open in 1815. The road was sold off in 1848.

=== Designation ===
In 1908, the New York State Legislature created Route 8, an unsigned legislative route extending from Binghamton to Kirkland (west of Utica) via Greene, Norwich, Sherburne, Bouckville, and Oriskany Falls. Also assigned at this time was Route 25, which passed through Barneveld, Remsen and Forestport on its way from Whitesboro to Albany, and Route 27, which began at Route 25 in Forestport and went northwest to Alexandria Bay by way of Boonville, Potters Corners, Lowville, Carthage, Watertown, and Clayton. Route 25 originally went directly from Barneveld to Remsen; however, it was realigned by 1920 to serve the village of Prospect to the east.

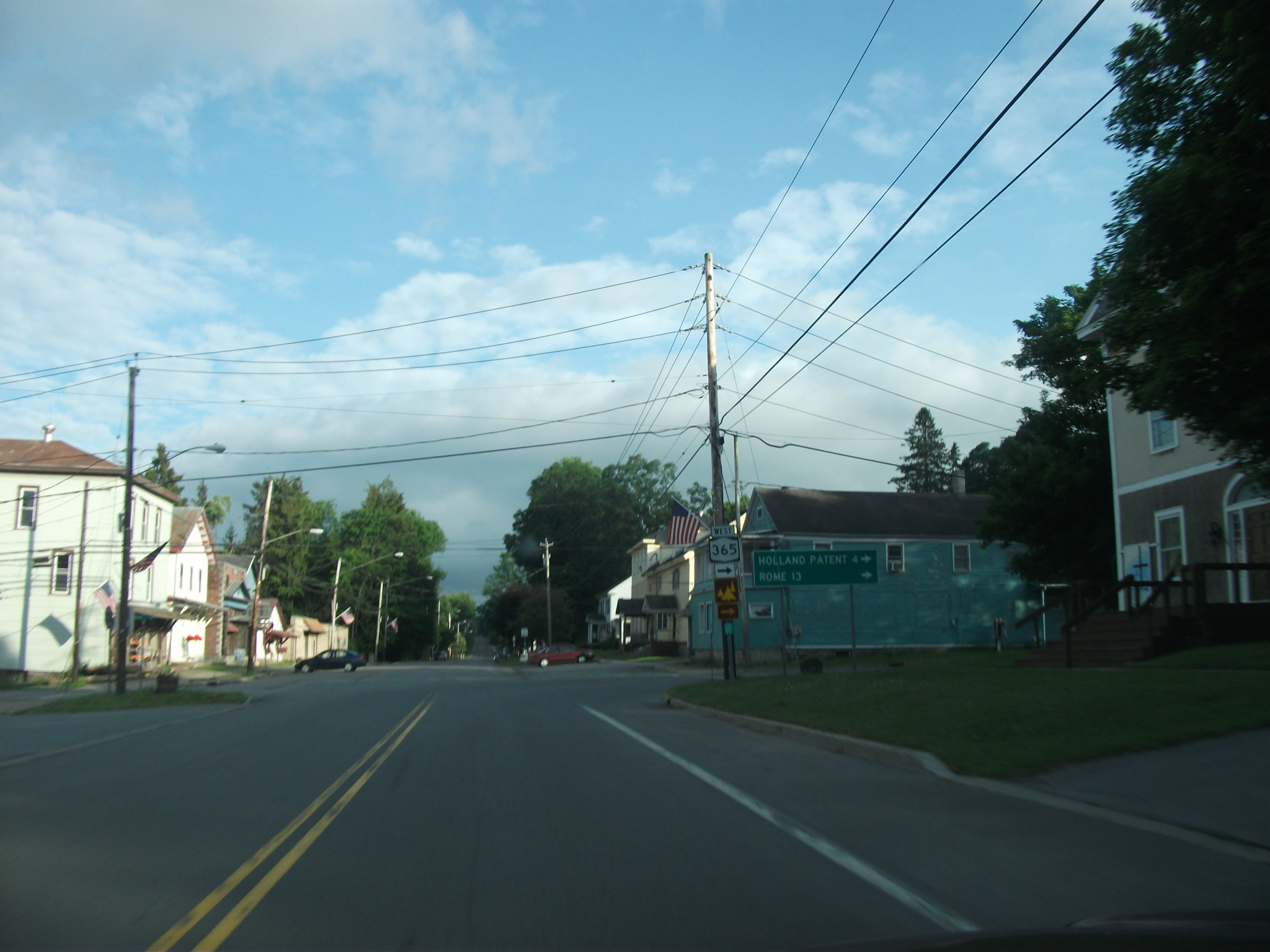
Former routing of NY 12 and 28 through Barneveld. Former NY 12 and 28 continued past where NY 365 turns west, now known as NY 921D

When the first set of posted routes in New York were assigned in 1924, NY 12 was assigned to an alignment extending from Binghamton to Clayton via Norwich, Utica, and Watertown. It utilized legislative Route 8 from Binghamton to just south of Clinton, where it veered northeast to serve the city of Utica instead of continuing north on Route 6 (modern NY 233) to Kirkland. In the vicinity of Utica, NY 12 initially followed Clinton Road, Genesee Street, and Trenton Road through the city. Past Utica, it continued north on Trenton Road to a point south of Trenton (now Barneveld), where it briefly followed its current routing. NY 12 turned off again in Trenton to follow legislative Route 25's original alignment on Mappa Avenue in Trenton and Main Street in Remsen. NY 12 continued north from Remsen on legislative Route 25.

At Forestport, NY 12 left Route 25 to follow legislative Route 27 to Lowville. In Lowville, NY 12 split from Route 27 and proceeded northwest to Watertown via Copenhagen, bypassing the slightly more circuitous route that Route 27 took via Carthage on modern NY 26, NY 126, and NY 3. NY 12 rejoined legislative Route 27 in Watertown and followed it to Clayton, where NY 12 ended at NY 3, which was also assigned in 1924. At the time, the segment of legislative Route 27 between Clayton and Alexandria Bay was designated as part of NY 3.

=== Realignments and terminus changes ===
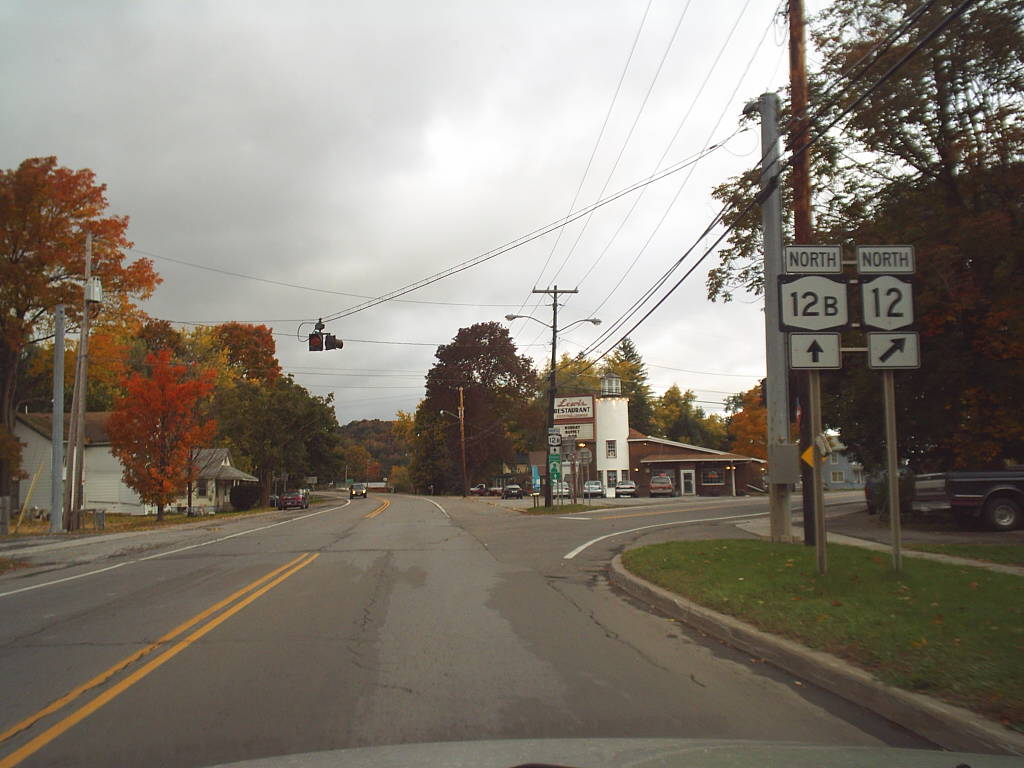
The junction of NY 12 and NY 12B in Sherburne. At different points in the 1920s, the straight path carried NY 12 and NY 12A.

In the late 1920s, NY 12 was realigned between Sherburne and Utica to follow a more direct alignment between the two locations via Sangerfield. Its former routing to the west became NY 12A (now NY 12B). As a result, NY 12 now entered Utica on Paris Road. In the 1930 renumbering of state highways in New York, NY 3 was rerouted onto its current alignment east of Watertown while the former routing of NY 3 from Clayton to Alexandria Bay became an extension of NY 12. Also created as part of the renumbering was NY 12D, an alternate route of NY 12 between Potters Corners and Lowville via Lyons Falls. By the following year, NY 12D was rerouted south of Lyons Falls to follow a routing similar to modern NY 12 to Boonville. The alignments of NY 12 and NY 12D between the two villages were swapped c. 1939, placing NY 12D on the direct highway between the two and NY 12 on the slightly more circuitous route via Lyons Falls.

NY 12 originally extended southward into downtown Binghamton by way of an overlap with US 11. The overlap was eliminated at some point between 1947 and 1970. On its north end, NY 12 was extended northeast over a new roadway along the St. Lawrence River to NY 37 in Morristown in the mid-1960s.

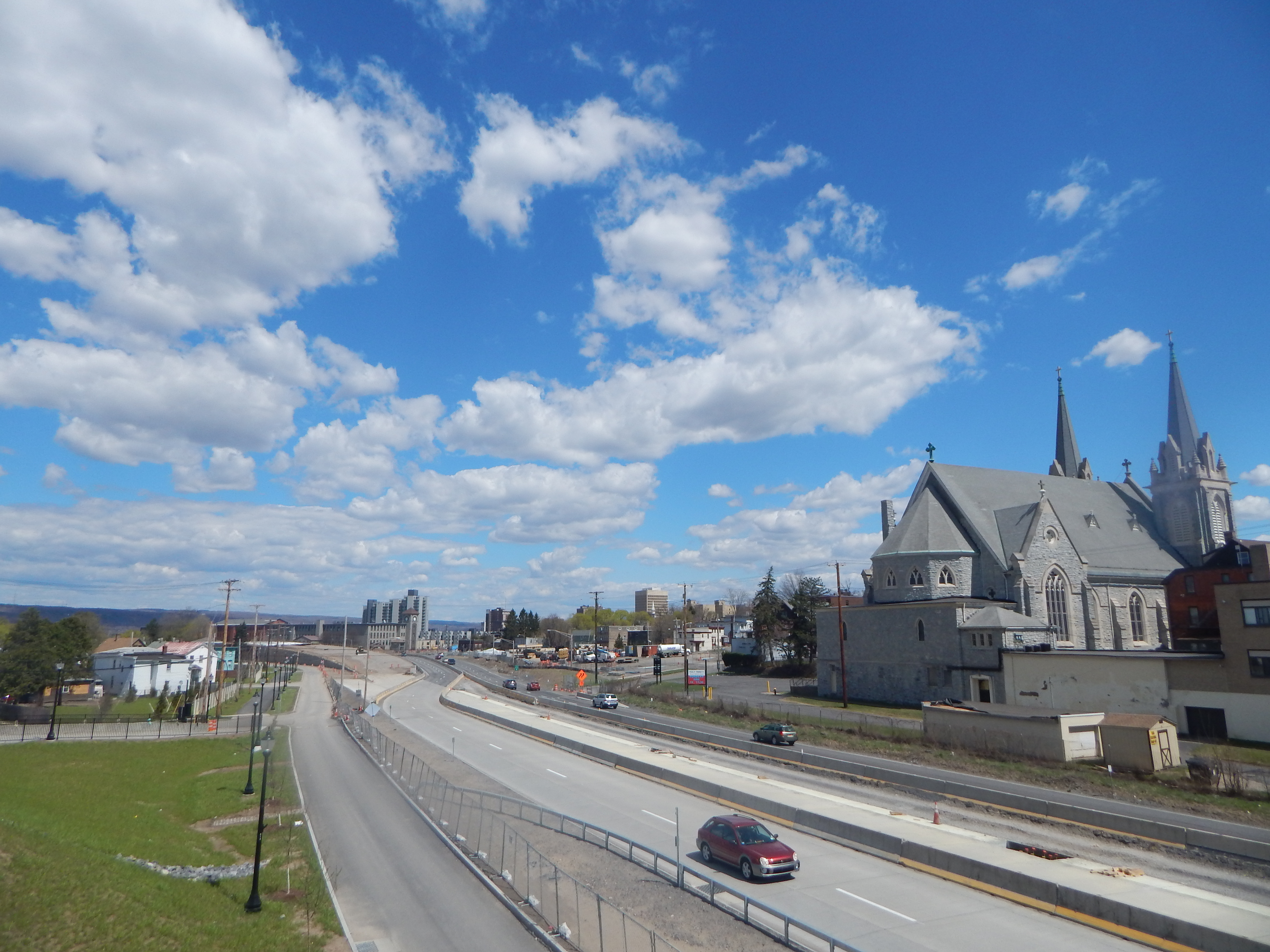
The Utica Arterial under construction in May 2015

In April 2014, work began on a $68.3 million project to replace the viaduct over Columbia Street, Lafayette Streets, and Oriskany Boulevard (NY 5A and NY 5S) in Utica. The nearly one mile stretch had signalized at-grade intersections that were causing safety concerns and some fatalities. In addition to the replacement of the viaduct, the alignment of the arterial was straightened, a new single point urban interchange was built at Court Street, and a pedestrian bridge was built across the roadway. The pedestrian bridge was opened by December 2014, and the remainder of the project was completed by October 2017.

=== Bypasses ===
Diagram of the interchange between I-790, NY 5, NY 8, NY 12 and NY 49

NY 12 has been realigned onto divided highways and limited-access highways over the years, particularly in Oneida County, to bypass communities along its routing. The first bypass that was constructed in Oneida County was around Remsen in the early 1950s. NY 12 was realigned onto the bypass, which passed to the west of the village, by 1954. Construction began by 1956 on a southward extension of the bypass that would take NY 12 around the eastern edge of Barneveld. It opened to traffic by 1958. Farther south, in Utica, a new limited-access highway was built through the downtown portion of the city in the early 1960s. At the time, it began at French Road and ended at Trenton Road. It became a realignment of NY 12 by 1964. An extension of the road southwest to Genesee Street in New Hartford was completed by 1968, at which time NY 12 was realigned to follow New Paris Road into the city. A limited-access highway bypassing Trenton Road and linking the Utica expressway and the Barneveld–Remsen bypass was completed by 1973, resulting in the rerouting of NY 12 onto the roadway. The former routing of NY 12 along Trenton Road from the Utica city line to Powell Road is now CR 91.

The route has also been realigned in areas to bypass smaller communities along the highway. One such location is in the vicinity of the village of Greene, where NY 12 initially followed Chenango Street through the village. The current bypass around the western edge of the village was built in the late 1970s and completed by 1981.

== Major intersections ==
County	Location	mi	km	Destinations	Notes
Broome	Chenango	0.00	0.00	US 11 (Front Street / Castle Creek Road) to I-81 – Castle Creek, Binghamton	Southern terminus
Broome	Chenango	0.53	0.85	NY 12A east (Chenango Bridge Road) to I-88 – Chenango Bridge	Western terminus of NY 12A
Broome	Barker	6.40	10.30	NY 79 north – Whitney Point	Southern terminus of NY 12 / NY 79 overlap; hamlet of Chenango Forks
Broome	Barker	6.63	10.67	NY 79 south – North Fenton, Chenango Valley State Park	Northern terminus of NY 12 / NY 79 overlap
Chenango	Village of Greene	14.30	23.01	NY 41 south / NY 206 (Genesee Street) – Bainbridge, Whitney Point	Southern terminus of NY 12 / NY 41 overlap
Chenango	Village of Greene	14.76	23.75	NY 41 north	Northern terminus of NY 12 / NY 41 overlap
Chenango	Village of Oxford	27.82	44.77	NY 220 west (Lafayette Park) – Bowman Lake State Park	Southern terminus of NY 12 / NY 220 overlap
Chenango	Village of Oxford	28.46	45.80	NY 220 east – Guilford, New York State Veterans Home	Northern terminus of NY 12 / NY 220 overlap
Chenango	City of Norwich	35.73	57.50	NY 990L north (East Main Street)	Southern terminus of NY 990L; former eastern terminus of NY 319
Chenango	City of Norwich	36.12	58.13	NY 23 (Pleasant Street / Rexford Street) – South New Berlin, South Plymouth	
Chenango	Town of Norwich	37.22	59.90	NY 320 east – New Berlin	Western terminus of NY 320
Chenango	Village of Sherburne	47.38	76.25	NY 80 (West State Street / East State Street) – New Berlin, Rogers Environmental Education Center	
Chenango	Village of Sherburne	48.13	77.46	NY 12B north – Earlville, Hamilton, Colgate University	Southern terminus of NY 12B
Oneida	Sangerfield	66.33	106.75	US 20 – Madison, Bridgewater	
Oneida	Waterville	67.62	108.82	NY 315 north (Buell Avenue) – Deansboro	Southern terminus of NY 315
Oneida	Town of New Hartford	79.73	128.31	NY 921E (Genesee Street) – New Hartford	Western terminus of unsigned NY 921E
Oneida	Town of New Hartford	79.89	128.57	NY 5 west to NY 12B south – Syracuse, Clinton	Southern terminus of NY 5 / NY 12 overlap
Oneida	Utica	80.54	129.62	NY 8 south / NY 840 west	Cloverleaf interchange; southern terminus of NY 8 / NY 12 overlap; eastern terminus of NY 840
Oneida	Utica	73.27– 73.67	117.92– 118.56	French Road ( NY 921W) –	Trumpet interchange
Oneida	Utica	73.78– 74.13	118.74– 119.30	Burrstone Road ( NY 921B) – , MVCC, Utica Zoo	Partial cloverleaf interchange
Oneida	Utica	83.83	134.91	NY 5A west / NY 5S east I-790 begins	Eastern terminus of NY 5A; western terminus of NY 5S; southern terminus of I-790; southern terminus of NY 12 overlap
Oneida	Utica	84.70	136.31	I-790 north / NY 5 east / NY 49 west	Eastern terminus of NY 49; northern terminus of I-790 / NY 12 and NY 5 / NY 12 overlaps; to I-90 / Thruway
Oneida	Deerfield	89.82	144.55	NY 8 north – Poland, Speculator	Northern terminus of NY 8 / NY 12 overlap
Oneida	Trenton	95.96	154.43	NY 28 south – Poland	Southern terminus of NY 12 / NY 28 overlap
Oneida	Trenton	96.25	154.90	Mappa Avenue ( NY 921D) – Barneveld	Southern terminus of unsigned NY 921D; former NY 921; former routing of NY 12 and 28
Oneida	Trenton	97.67	157.18	NY 365 – Barneveld, Prospect, Rome	Partial cloverleaf interchange
Oneida	Village of Remsen	100.56	161.84	NY 920V (Steuben Street) – Remsen	Western terminus of unsigned NY 920V; northern terminus of former NY 28B
Oneida	Town of Boonville	107.39	172.83	NY 28 north – Old Forge, Blue Mountain Lake	Northern terminus of NY 12 / NY 28 overlap; hamlet of Alder Creek
Oneida	Village of Boonville			NY 12D north (Main Street / Black River Trail) – Boonville, Turin, Pixley Falls State Park, Dodge-Pratt Northam	Southern terminus of NY 12D
Lewis	Lyons Falls	124.35	200.12	NY 12D south (Cherry Street) – Constableville, Lyons Falls	Northern terminus of NY 12D
Lewis	Village of Lowville	137.94	221.99	NY 26 south – Rome	Southern terminus of NY 12 / NY 26 overlap
Lewis	Village of Lowville	138.52	222.93	NY 26 north / NY 812 north	Northern terminus of NY 12 / NY 26 overlap; southern terminus of NY 812
Lewis	Town of Lowville	141.34	227.46	NY 177 west – Adams Center	Eastern terminus of NY 177
Lewis	Copenhagen	150.94	242.91	CR 194 (Mechanic Street)	Eastern terminus of former NY 194
Jefferson	Town of Watertown	163.57	263.24	NY 126 east (State Street) – Carthage	Western terminus of NY 126
Jefferson	City of Watertown	163.95	263.85	NY 3 east (Eastern Boulevard / Black River Trail / Olympic Scenic Byway) – Fort Drum	Eastern terminus of NY 3 / NY 12 overlap
Jefferson	City of Watertown	165.37	266.14	US 11 north / NY 3 west	Western terminus of NY 3 / NY 12 overlap (northbound); eastern terminus of US 11 / NY 12 overlap (southbound); southern terminus of US 11 / NY 12 overlap (northbound)
Jefferson	City of Watertown			NY 283 east (Factory Street)	Northbound intersection; western terminus of NY 283
Jefferson	City of Watertown			US 11 north (Washington Street)	Southbound intersection; western terminus of US 11 / NY 12 overlap
Jefferson	City of Watertown	165.72	266.70	US 11 north (Mill Street)	Northbound intersection; northern terminus of US 11 / NY 12 overlap
Jefferson	City of Watertown			US 11 south (South Massey Street) / NY 3 west (Arsenal Street)	Southbound intersection; western terminus of NY 3 / NY 12 overlap; southern terminus of US 11 / NY 12 overlap
Jefferson	City of Watertown			NY 12F west (Coffeen Street / Black River Trail) – Oswego	Southbound intersection; eastern terminus of NY 12F
Jefferson	City of Watertown	166.12	267.34	US 11 south (Leray Street)	Northern terminus of US 11 / NY 12 overlap (southbound)
Jefferson	City of Watertown	166.35	267.71	NY 12E north	Southern terminus of NY 12E
Jefferson	Pamelia	167.52	269.60	I-81 – Syracuse, Canada	Exit 158 (I-81); diamond interchange
Jefferson	Pamelia	169.64	273.01	NY 342 east to I-81 – Fort Drum, Black River, New York State Police	Western terminus of NY 342
Jefferson	Town of Clayton	175.49	282.42	NY 180 (Fox Road) – La Fargeville, Limerick	
Jefferson	Village of Clayton	187.10	301.11	NY 12E south (State Street / Seaway Trail) / Great Lakes Seaway Trail – Cape Vincent	Northern terminus of NY 12E
Jefferson	Village of Clayton	187.10	301.11	James Street ( NY 970L) – Clayton Business District	Terminus of unsigned NY 970L
Jefferson	Village of Clayton	187.30	301.43	Webb Street ( NY 970L)	Terminus of unsigned NY 970L
Jefferson	Orleans	192.21	309.33	NY 180 south – La Fargeville	Northern terminus of NY 180
Jefferson	Alexandria	194.22	312.57	I-81 to Highway 401 – Watertown, Syracuse, Canada, Wellesley Island	Exit 181 (I-81); cloverleaf interchange
Jefferson	Alexandria Bay	198.20	318.97	NY 26 south (Church Street) – Redwood / Church Street ( NY 971K)	Northern terminus of NY 26; southern terminus of unsigned NY 971K
St. Lawrence	Morristown	222.27	357.71	NY 37 / Great Lakes Seaway Trail – Ogdensburg, Watertown	Northern terminus
1.000 mi = 1.609 km; 1.000 km = 0.621 mi: Concurrency terminus

== Suffixed routes ==
New York State Route 12A
- Location: Chenango Bridge
- Length: 0.98 mi (1,580 m)

NY 12 has had seven suffixed routes bearing six different designations. Two have since been removed and at least partially renumbered. All of the routes were assigned as part of the 1930 renumbering of state highways in New York unless otherwise noted.

- The NY 12A designation has been used for two distinct highways:
  - The first NY 12A was an alternate route of NY 12 between Sherburne and Utica. It was assigned in 1928 and renumbered to NY 12B in the 1930 renumbering of state highways in New York.
  - The current NY 12A (0.98 miles or 1.58 kilometres) is an east–west spur connecting NY 12 to I-88 and NY 7 on the banks of the Chenango River in Chenango Bridge, Broome County. The entire route is known as Chenango Bridge Road and is one of only six signed New York state highways less than a mile in length. The route was assigned in 1930.
- NY 12B (33.57 miles or 54.03 kilometres) is an alternate route of NY 12 between Sherburne and Utica.
- NY 12C is a former alternate route of NY 12 between Utica and Barneveld. The route was eliminated in 1970, at which time the lone portion of NY 12C that did not overlap another state route was redesignated as NY 291.
- NY 12D (11.50 miles or 18.51 kilometres) is an alternate route of NY 12 between Boonville and Lyons Falls.
- NY 12E (39.76 miles or 63.99 kilometres) is an alternate route of NY 12 between Watertown and Clayton. While NY 12 follows a direct path between the two locations, NY 12E veers to the west to serve communities along Lake Ontario and the St. Lawrence River.
- NY 12F (6.89 miles or 11.09 kilometres) is a spur connecting NY 12 in downtown Watertown to NY 180 near the Watertown International Airport in Dexter.

== See also ==
- List of county routes in Oneida County, New York
