= Interstate 790 =

Highway in Oneida County, New York, US

Interstate 790
- Map of Utica in Oneida County with I-790 highlighted in red

Route information
- Auxiliary route of I-90
- Maintained by NYSDOT
- Length: 2.41 mi (3.88 km)
- Existed: 1960s–present
- NHS: Entire route

Major junctions
- West end: NY 5 / NY 8 / NY 12 / NY 5A / NY 5S in Utica
- East end: I-90 Toll / New York Thruway / NY 5 in Utica

Location
- Country: United States
- State: New York
- Counties: Oneida

Highway system
- Interstate Highway System; Main; Auxiliary; Suffixed; Business; Future; New York Highways; Interstate; US; State; Reference; Parkways
← NY 787	→ NY 812

Interstate 790 (I-790) is an auxiliary Interstate Highway in the city of Utica, New York, in the United States. It runs for 2.41 miles (3.88 km) from an interchange with New York State Route 5A (NY 5A) and NY 5S in downtown Utica to a pair of interchanges with Genesee Street east of the city. All of I-790 is concurrent with NY 5, and the portion south of NY 49 is also concurrent with NY 8 and NY 12. I-790 connects to exit 31 of the New York State Thruway (I-90) by way of an interchange near its east end. According to the New York State Department of Transportation (NYSDOT), I-790 follows NY 5 to Genesee Street while the highway leading to Thruway exit 31 is merely a pair of ramps connecting I-790 to its parent. The north–south portion of I-790 between its western terminus and NY 49 is named the North–South Arterial Highway.

== Route description ==
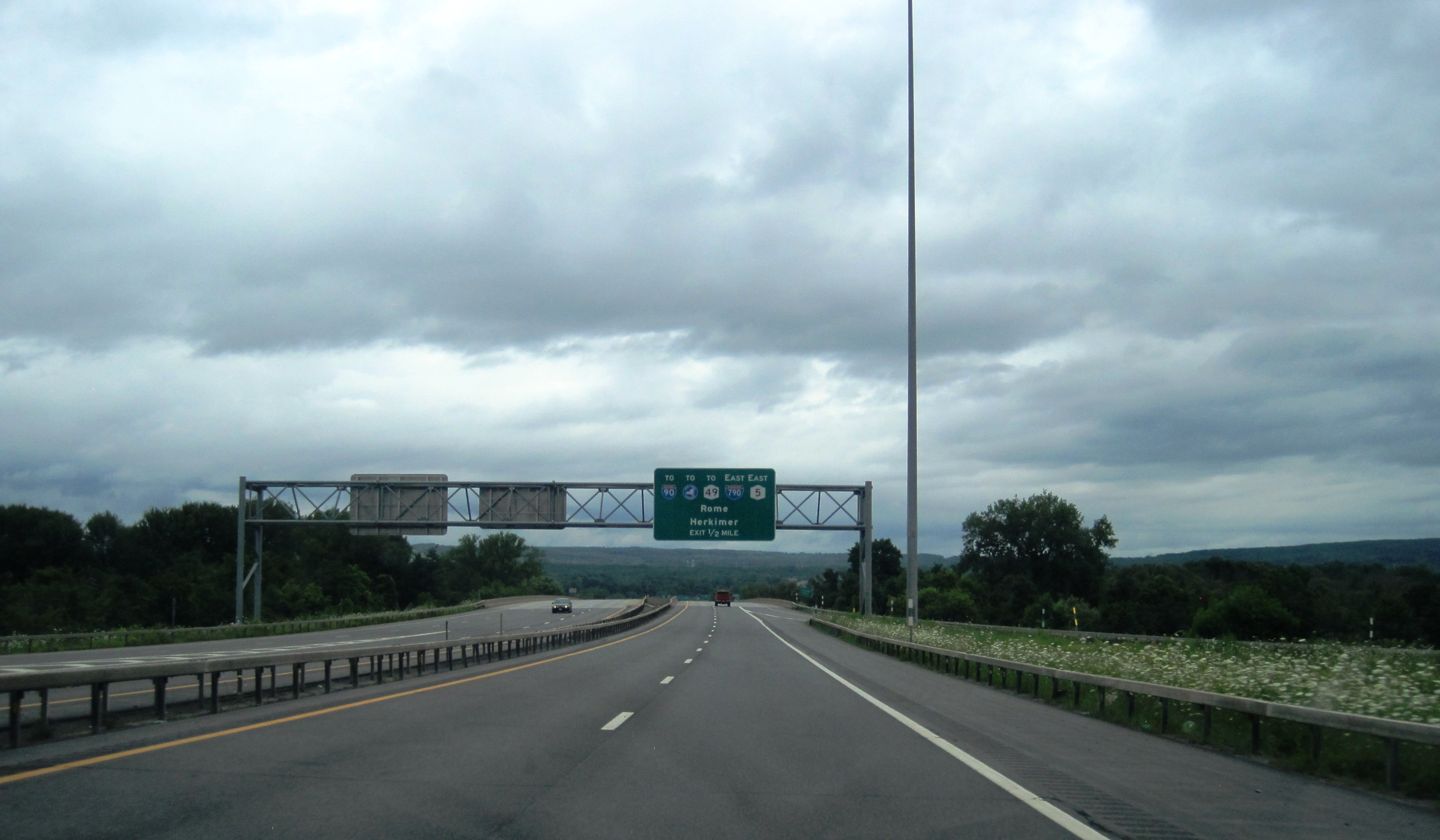
Eastbound I-790 approaching NY 49

Diagram of the interchange between I-790, NY 5, NY 8, NY 12, and NY 49

I-790 begins at an interchange connecting NY 5A and NY 5S to the North–South Arterial (NY 5, NY 8, and NY 12) on the northern edge of the city of Utica. The route heads northeast from this point, overlapping with NY 5, NY 8, and NY 12 along a six-lane limited-access highway leading away from downtown. As the road leaves the NY 5A and NY 5S junction, it crosses over the CSX Transportation's Mohawk Subdivision rail line, which runs along the northern edge of the interchange. Past the tracks, the dense commercial and residential blocks that comprise downtown Utica give way to a mostly undeveloped strip of land surrounding the Mohawk River and Erie Canal. I-790 continues on a northeasterly track across the open area, crossing the Mohawk River and a railroad grade just north of the waterway.

As I-790 crosses the Erie Canal, it enters a complex interchange built around the New York State Thruway (I-90). While NY 8 and NY 12 continue north through the junction, I-790 and NY 5 exit to the southeast, leaving NY 8 and NY 12 to meet NY 49 adjacent to the thruway. The two directions of NY 49 are physically split by the thruway; while the eastbound direction runs along the southern edge of the thruway, the westbound half flanks the thruway's westbound lanes. East of the interchange, I-790 and NY 5 take over NY 49's split right-of-way, following an identical configuration for about one mile (1.6 km) through Utica's northern suburbs. I-790 continues east along the thruway to the exit with northbound Genesee Street, where the Interstate Highway designation ends and the highways adjacent to the thruway become solely designated as NY 5.

While I-790 eastbound has an exit leading directly to exit 31 of the thruway, Utica's only exit along the highway, there is no direct connection from exit 31 to I-790 westbound. Instead, I-790 westbound uses part of Genesee Street to get between the I-90 interchange and the highways carrying NY 5 along the thruway.

== History ==
The portion of the North–South Arterial between Oriskany Street (NY 5A and NY 5S) and River Road was completed in the late 1950s. By 1961, a two-lane, limited-access highway was constructed along the south side of the New York State Thruway between the arterial and Thruway exit 31. The road left the arterial just north of the Erie Canal and had one intermediate interchange with Genesee Street before connecting directly to I-90 at exit 31. The two-lane connector and the section of the North–South Arterial between Oriskany Street and the connector was designated as I-790 by 1965. The connector was rebuilt as a four-lane freeway that straddles I-90. The direct connection from I-90 to I-790 was eliminated at this time, necessitating the use of surface streets and passing through traffic lights for traffic to reach I-790.

== Future ==
There are efforts within NYSDOT to renumber NY 49 and NY 365 (from Utica to Thruway exit 33 in the town of Verona) to NY 790, with the eventual plan of renumbering it again as an extension of I-790. The cost for the conversion to Interstate standards is estimated to be between $150 million and $200 million.

US Representative Mike Arcuri introduced legislation in July 2010 that would redesignate the 11-mile (18 km) portion of NY 49 from the North–South Arterial in Utica to NY 825 in Rome as part of I-790. The conversion is expected to cost between $1.5 million and $2 million, which would be used to install new signage along the expressway. By adding the Utica–Rome Expressway to the Interstate Highway System, the area would receive approximately $10 million in additional federal highway funding over the next five years. According to Arcuri, the proposed redesignation is part of a larger, long-term goal of creating an Interstate Highway-standard freeway that would begin at Thruway exit 33 in Verona and pass through Rome before ending at Thruway exit 31. The portion of NY 49 east of NY 825 already meets Interstate Highway standards.

== Exit list ==
The entire route is in Utica, Oneida County. All exits are unnumbered.

mi	km	Destinations	Notes
0.00	0.00	NY 5 west / NY 8 south / NY 12 south	Continuation west; western end of NY 5/NY 8/NY 12 concurrency
0.00	0.00	NY 5A west / NY 5S east – Whitesboro, Downtown Utica	Eastern terminus of NY 5A; western terminus of NY 5S
0.87	1.40	NY 8 north / NY 12 north – Poland, Watertown	Eastern end of NY 8/NY 12 concurrency
1.17	1.88	River Road / Riverside Drive	Westbound entrance only
1.25	2.01	NY 49 west – Rome	Eastern terminus of NY 49
1.84	2.96	I-90 Toll / New York Thruway / Genesee Street south	Eastbound exit and westbound entrance; exit 31 on I-90 / Thruway
		Genesee Street north	Eastbound exit and westbound entrance
2.29	3.69	NY 5 east (Leland Avenue)	At-grade intersection; eastern end of NY 5 concurrency
1.000 mi = 1.609 km; 1.000 km = 0.621 mi: Concurrency terminus; Incomplete access
