= Oquaga Creek State Park =

State park in New York, United States

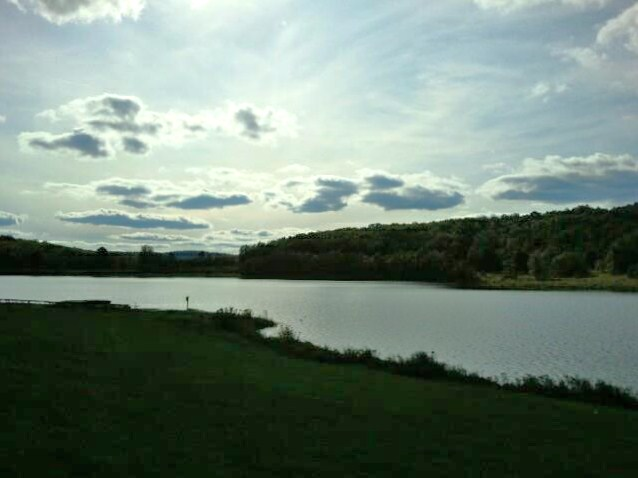
- Arctic Lake at Oquaga Creek State Park.

- Location within New York
- Type: State park
- Location: 5995 County Route 20; Bainbridge, New York
- Nearest city: Bainbridge, New York
- Coordinates: 42°10′34″N 75°25′34″W
- Area: 1,385 acres (5.60 km^{2})
- Created: 1979
- Operator: New York State Office of Parks, Recreation and Historic Preservation
- Visitors: 53,495 (in 2014)
- Open: All year
- Camp sites: 90
- Website: Oquaga Creek State Park

Oquaga Creek State Park is a 1,385-acre (5.60 km^{2}) state park in Broome, Delaware, and Chenango counties, New York. The park is partially in the towns of Masonville and Sanford. Broome County Route 241 passes through the park.

== Park description ==
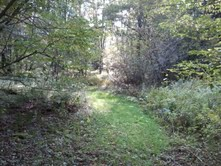
One of several nature trails available for hiking.

Oquaga Creek State Park has 90 campsites, one full-service cottage, and several "rustic" cabins. A limited number of seasonal campsites are also available. There are six miles (9.7 km) of hiking trails which offer views of wildlife such as deer, weasels, and various birds, in addition to wild plants such as wild blueberries and wild grapes. Many of the campsites are lined with raspberry bushes and wild strawberries.

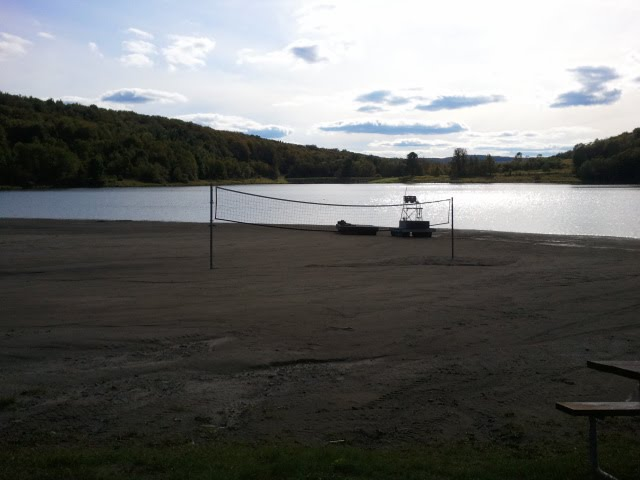
The public beach on Arctic Lake.

Arctic Lake, with a surface area of 55 acres (0.22 km^{2}), is available for fishing, and its beach is open to swimmers. In the winter, the lake is used for ice fishing and skating.

The park was closed for camping during the 2010 season due to New York State's budget shortfalls; however, the park's campground re-opened in summer 2011.

The park also includes a nine-hole disc golf course, built in 1979.

== See also ==
- List of New York state parks
