= Yorkville, Oneida County, New York =

Yorkville, New York
- Village
- Location in Oneida County and the state of New York.
- Coordinates: 43°6′39″N 75°16′24″W
- Country: United States
- State: New York
- County: Oneida

Government
  - Mayor: Michael A. Mahoney

Area
  - Total: 0.67 sq mi (1.74 km^{2})
  - Land: 0.67 sq mi (1.74 km^{2})
  - Water: 0 sq mi (0.00 km^{2})

Population (2020)
  - Total: 2,657
  - Density: 3,957.7/sq mi (1,528.08/km^{2})
- Time zone: UTC-5 (Eastern (EST))
  - Summer (DST): UTC-4 (EDT)
- ZIP Codes: 13495 (Yorkville); 13501 (Utica)
- FIPS code: 36-84099
- Website: villageofyorkvilleny.org

Yorkville is a village in Oneida County, New York, United States. The population was 2,689 at the 2010 census. The village of Yorkville is in the southeastern part of the town of Whitestown, adjacent to the city of Utica.

== History ==
The early population was composed of workers from the textile mills in adjacent New York Mills. The village was incorporated in 1902. On April 5, 1912 martial law was proclaimed to stop rioting textile strikers in Yorkville, Utica, and New York Mills.

Once supported by manufacturing, the area has lost most of jobs in this field. Hyosung USA operated a 240,000 square foot reinforced fabric lining plant on 2214 Whitesboro Street. Formerly Utica Converters, the plant was acquired by Hyosung in 2008 and closed in 2013 laying off 85. Built in 1908, the plant was once a Goodyear plant.

== Geography ==
Yorkville is located at 43°6′39″N 75°16′24″W (43.110719, -75.273306).

According to the United States Census Bureau, the village has a total area of .7 square mile (1.7 km^{2}), all land.

== Demographics ==
Historical population
Census	Pop.	Note	%±
1870	213		—
1880	295		38.5%
1910	691		—
1920	1,512		118.8%
1930	3,406		125.3%
1940	3,311		−2.8%
1950	3,528		6.6%
1960	3,749		6.3%
1970	3,425		−8.6%
1980	3,115		−9.1%
1990	2,972		−4.6%
2000	2,675		−10.0%
2010	2,689		0.5%
2020	2,657		−1.2%
U.S. Decennial Census

As of the census of 2000, there were 2,675 people, 1,160 households, and 718 families residing in the village. The population density was 4,005.7 inhabitants per square mile (1,546.6/km^{2}). There were 1,259 housing units at an average density of 1,885.3 per square mile (727.9/km^{2}). The racial makeup of the village was 98.24% White, 0.49% African American, 0.49% Asian, 0.22% from other races, and 0.56% from two or more races. Hispanic or Latino of any race were 1.16% of the population.

There were 1,160 households, out of which 27.0% had children under the age of 18 living with them, 42.9% were married couples living together, 14.7% had a female householder with no husband present, and 38.1% were non-families. 33.5% of all households were made up of individuals, and 16.3% had someone living alone who was 65 years of age or older. The average household size was 2.30 and the average family size was 2.91.

In the village, the population was spread out, with 22.5% under the age of 18, 8.7% from 18 to 24, 27.1% from 25 to 44, 22.4% from 45 to 64, and 19.3% who were 65 years of age or older. The median age was 39 years. For every 100 females, there were 88.8 males. For every 100 females age 18 and over, there were 87.0 males.

The median income for a household in the village was $33,490, and the median income for a family was $42,813. Males had a median income of $29,575 versus $22,382 for females. The per capita income for the village was $17,727. 12.1% of the population and 10.1% of families were below the poverty line. Out of the total people living in poverty, 23.7% are under the age of 18 and 8.2% are 65 or older.
