= New York State Route 12B =

Highway in New York

New York State Route 12B
- Map of central New York with NY 12B highlighted in red

Route information
- Auxiliary route of NY 12
- Maintained by NYSDOT
- Length: 35.53 mi (57.18 km)
- Existed: 1930–present

Major junctions
- South end: NY 12 in Sherburne
- US 20 / NY 26 in Madison
- North end: NY 5 in New Hartford

Location
- Country: United States
- State: New York
- Counties: Chenango, Madison, Oneida

Highway system
- New York Highways; Interstate; US; State; Reference; Parkways
← NY 12A	→ NY 12C

New York State Route 12B (NY 12B) is a state highway in the central part of New York in the United States. NY 12B is a north–south highway connecting Oneida County in the north to Chenango County in the south, passing through Madison County in between. The southern terminus of NY 12B is at NY 12 in the village of Sherburne. The northern terminus is at NY 5 in the town of New Hartford. In Madison County, NY 12B directly abuts the campus of Colgate University in the village of Hamilton.

== Route description ==
=== Sherburne to Madison ===
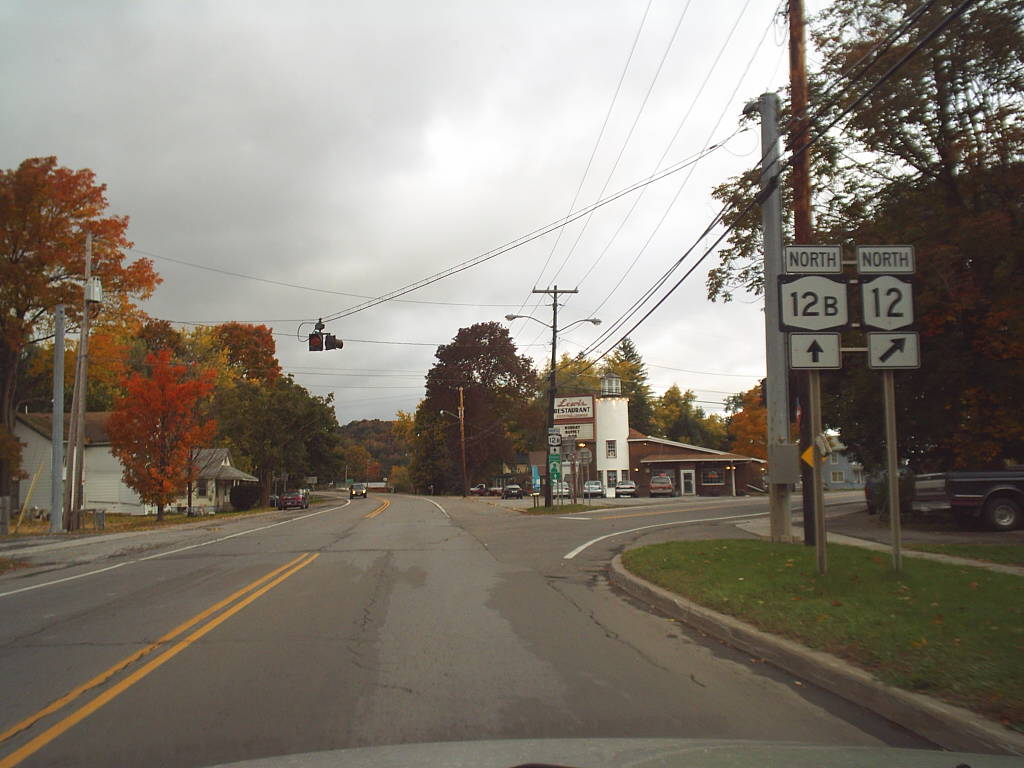
Southern terminus of NY 12B in the village of Sherburne, as seen from NY 12 north

NY 12B begins at an intersection with NY 12 (North Main Street / Utica Road) in the village of Sherburne. From NY 12, NY 12B proceeds north on North Main Street, while NY 12 proceeds northeast on Utica Road. A mix of residences and businesses parallel NY 12B, which leaves the village for the town of Sherburne to the northwest. NY 12B parallels a railroad line to the north, passing Baldwin Station, where the railroad crosses. The route becomes rural, bending to the north through Sherburne and paralleling the Springfield River. The two-lane rural roadway continues north, crosses the county line into Madison County and entering the village of Earlville. In Earlville, NY 12B doubles as North Main Street, a two-lane residential street that crosses through.

After Earlville, NY 12B continues northward into the town of Hamilton, where it becomes a two-lane rural highway once again. After crossing into the town of Lebanon, County Route 77 (CR 77; Middleport Road) intersects in the hamlet of Middleport. Middleport consists of a stretch of residences before NY 12B bends to the northeast and out. Crossing back into Hamilton, NY 12B crosses through the campus of Colgate University and Taylor Lake, before entering the village of Hamilton. In Hamilton, NY 12B gains the name of Broad Street, intersecting with CR 70 (Hamilton Street) before entering downtown as a two-lane commercial street. At the junction with CR 83 (Madison Street) and CR 75 (Lebanon Street), NY 12B turns northward and leaves the village on Utica Street.

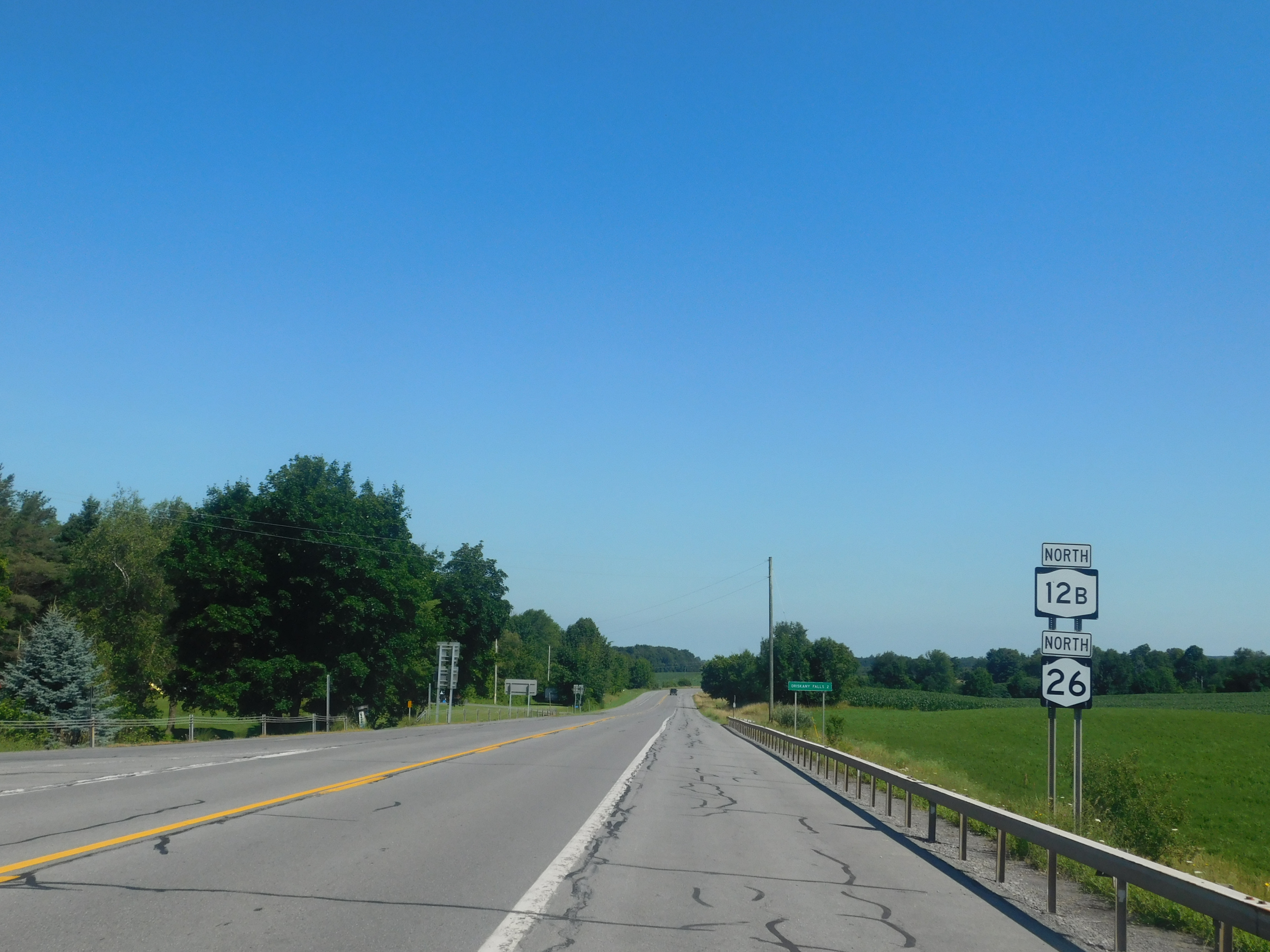
NY 12B and NY 26 north in Madison from US 20

Re-entering the town of Hamilton, NY 12B proceeds to the northwest alongside Hamilton Municipal Airport. After the airport, NY 12B enters the town of Eaton, where it passes Woodman Pond and enters the hamlet of Pecksport. In Pecksport, NY 12B intersects with the southern terminus of NY 46, where NY 12B bends to the northeast, paralleling CR 81 (Canal Road) and an abandoned canal. The two roads begin to fork in different directions as NY 12B intersects US 20 and NY 26 now in the town of Madison. The three routes become concurrent, turning northeast past Madison Lake. The routes soon enter the hamlet of Madison Center, intersecting with CR 41 (North Street) and CR 83 (South Street). The two-lane residential/commercial street lines Madison Center, leaving before NY 12B and NY 26 fork to the north at a junction in the town of Madison.

=== Madison to Utica ===
Continuing north from US 20, NY 12B and NY 26 cross through the town of Madison, paralleling CR 43 (Valley Road) before both cross the county line into Oneida County. Immediately after crossing the county line, NY 12B and NY 26 enter the village of Oriskany Falls and gain the moniker of Madison Street. Passing west of Karl Spooner Memorial Field, NY 12B and NY 26 intersect with CR 3 (Broad Street) just before NY 26 turns west onto Main Street. NY 12B turns to the northeast onto the renamed North Main Street when CR 46 (College Street) continues north on the former right-of-way. Leaving Oriskany Falls, NY 12B loses the North Main moniker and becomes a two-lane rural road through a quarry in the town of Marshall.

In Marshall, NY 12B bends to the northeast and away from the quarry, remaining a two-lane road of fields and residences. After a mobile home, NY 12B begins to straighten to the north, entering the hamlet of Marshall, where it becomes a two-lane commercial roadway. In downtown Marshall, NY 12B intersects with the eastern terminus of CR 11 (West Hill Road) and soon the northern terminus of NY 315. NY 12B becomes residential and leaves the hamlet of Marshall, re-entering the town. Near the intersection with Bougusville Road, the route crosses the town line into Kirkland. NY 12B becomes a two-lane rural highway, bending to the east near an intersection with NY 233 and into the hamlet of Farmers Mill. In Farmers Mill, NY 12B intersects with Dugway Road, where it intersects with CR 16 (Post Street) and into the hamlet of Franklin Springs.

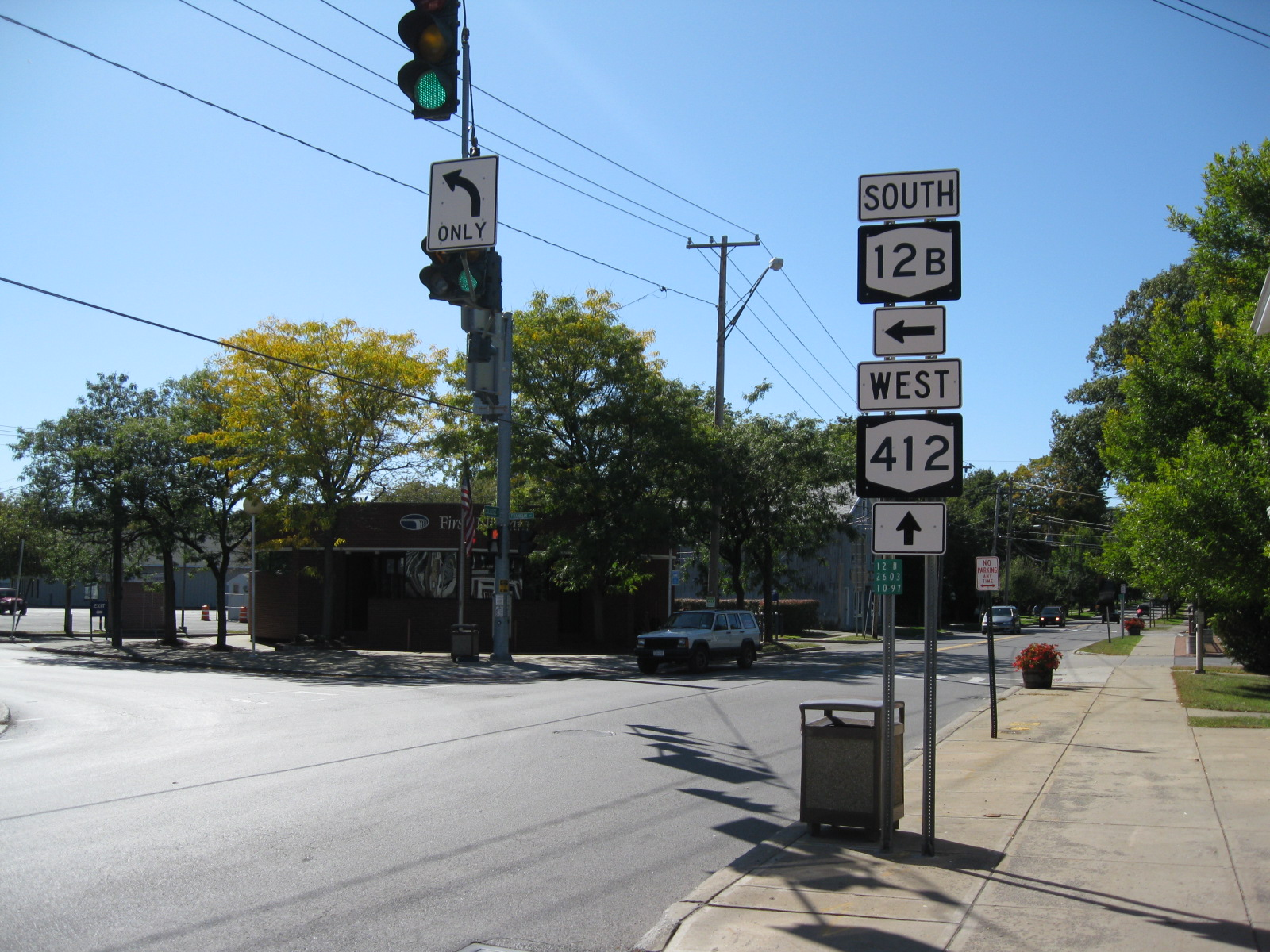
NY 12B southbound at the junction with NY 412 west in the village of Clinton

After an intersection with Dwight Avenue, NY 12B bends northeast out of the town of Kirkland and into the village of Clinton and gaining the name of Franklin Avenue. In Clinton, NY 12B becomes a two-lane commercial street before intersecting with the eastern terminus of NY 412 (College Street). NY 12B turns east onto College Street, crossing through downtown Clinton until the intersection with CR 17 (Fountain Street). At this junction, NY 12B turns northward on East Park Row, before leaving downtown Clinton to the northeast via Utica Street. The route remains a two-lane residential street, crossing Clinton Village Park before an intersection with CR 15 (Brimfield Street) before re-entering the town of Kirkland.

After re-entering Kirkland, NY 12B continues northeast as Utica Street, a two-lane residential street. The route soon bends to the east, intersecting with NY 5B (Limberlost Road), where the two routes become concurrent. A short distance after crossing into the town of New Hartford, NY 5B turns northward onto Middle Settlement Road. NY 12B continues eastward along now-Clinton Road, a two-lane commercial street until the junction with Merritt Place, where the street becomes residential, and bends to the northeast. A short distance after, NY 12B intersects with NY 5 (Seneca Turnpike) near the Yahnundasis Golf Club, which doubles as the former's northern terminus. NY 5 continues east into New Hartford and towards Utica.

== History ==
In 1908, the New York State Legislature created Route 8, an unsigned legislative route extending from the city of Binghamton to Kirkland. When the first set of posted routes in New York were assigned in 1924, all of Route 8 between Chenango Forks and Clinton became part of NY 12, which continued northeast through Clinton to Utica. The portion of NY 12 between Sherburne and Utica was realigned in 1928 to follow a new, more direct alignment to the east. The former routing of NY 12 between the two locations was redesignated as NY 12A. In the 1930 renumbering of state highways in New York, NY 12A was renumbered to NY 12B.

The section of NY 12B between Earlville and Hamilton has historically been susceptible to accidents. According to a study by the New York State Department of Transportation (NYSDOT), 93 accidents occurred along this portion of NY 12B from November 2006 to October 2009. Of those, 50 were the result of striking an animal while 15 others were cases where a motorist crashed into a fixed object. Area residents and officials had asked NYSDOT to lower the speed limit on the highway from 55 miles per hour (89 km/h) to 45 miles per hour (72 km/h); however, this request was denied in July 2010. Instead, NYSDOT will look into improving specific areas along the highway where accidents are more common.

== Major intersections ==
County	Location	mi	km	Destinations	Notes
Chenango	Village of Sherburne	0.00	0.00	NY 12 (North Main Street / Utica Road) – Utica, Norwich	Southern terminus
Madison	Eaton	14.06	22.63	NY 46 north to US 20 west – Munnsville, SUNY Morrisville	Southern terminus of NY 46; Hamlet of Pecksport
Madison	Town of Madison	16.52	26.59	US 20 west / NY 26 south – Morrisville	Western terminus of US 20 / NY 12B and NY 12B / NY 26 overlaps
Madison	Town of Madison	19.52	31.41	US 20 east – Sangerfield	Eastern terminus of US 20 / NY 12B overlap
Oneida	Oriskany Falls	22.07	35.52	NY 26 north (Main Street)	Eastern terminus of NY 12B / NY 26 overlap
Oneida	Marshall	26.33	42.37	NY 315 south – Waterville	Northern terminus of NY 315; hamlet of Deansboro
Oneida	Kirkland	29.34	47.22	NY 233 north (Harding Road) to I-90 / New York Thruway – Hamilton College	Southern terminus of NY 233
Oneida	Clinton	31.14	50.11	NY 412 west (College Street)	Eastern terminus of NY 412
Oneida	Kirkland	33.54	53.98	NY 5B west (Limberlost Road) – Kirkland	Western terminus of NY 5B / NY 12B overlap
Oneida	Kirkland	33.63	54.12	NY 5B east (Middle Settlement Road) – New York Mills	Eastern terminus of NY 5B / NY 12B overlap
Oneida	Town of New Hartford	35.53	57.18	NY 5 (Seneca Turnpike) to NY 12 – Utica, Syracuse	Northern terminus
1.000 mi = 1.609 km; 1.000 km = 0.621 mi: Concurrency terminus
