= Big Creek (Oriskany Creek tributary) =

Big Creek East Branch Oriskany Creek
- Location of the mouth of Big Creek Big Creek (Oriskany Creek tributary) (the United States)

Location
- Country: United States
- State: New York
- Region: Central New York
- County: Madison, Oneida
- Towns: Sangerfield, Marshall

Physical characteristics
- Source
  - coordinates: 42°55′46″N 75°19′20″W
- Mouth: Oriskany Creek
  - location: Deansboro, Oneida County, New York
  - coordinates: 42°59′48″N 75°24′58″W
  - elevation: 732 ft (223 m)

Big Creek also known as East Branch Oriskany Creek is a creek in Oneida County, New York. Big Creek flows into Oriskany Creek by Deansboro, New York.
