= M. French Swarthout =

American educator

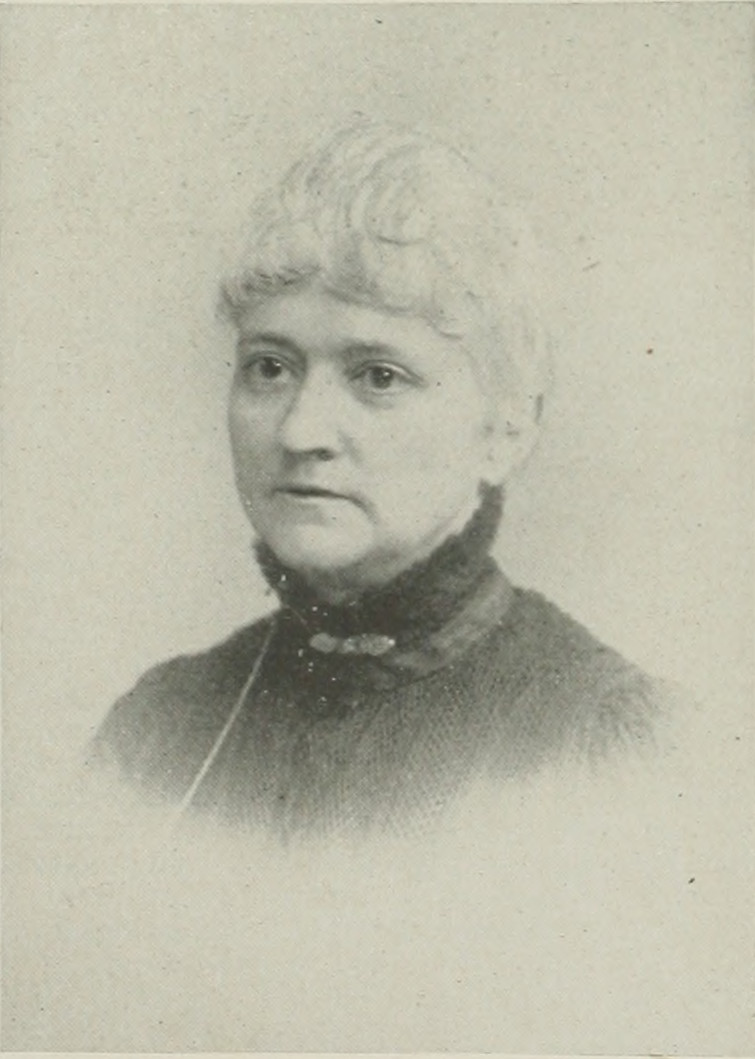
M. French Swarthout, A woman of the century

Mary French Swarthout (born September 15, 1844) was an American educator.

== Early life ==
Mary French Swarthout was born in Sangerfield, New York, on September 15, 1844.

She was educated in the Baptist Seminary in Waterville, New York, and afterwards took the course in the State Normal School in Albany, New York.

After finishing her school work, she moved with her parents to Lake County, Illinois.

== Career ==
Mary French Swarthout moved to Chicago, devoting her time to educational pursuits. She was engaged in the Chicago schools for the last fifteen years of the 19th Century.

She was the author of a series of arithmetics known as Sheldon's Graded Examples. These books were used in the schools of Chicago, and quite extensively throughout the West.

She was the vice-president of the Illinois Woman's Press Club and a member of the Authors' Club.

In 1892, together with Sarah Wilder Pratt, another prominent clubwoman and author of books on mathematics, she founded the Woman's Columbian Laundry, a company that should have been managed and employed only women. The venture was a success, but Pratt and Swarthout were outvoted and they filed a claim for being reimbursed.

== Personal life ==
Mary French Swarthout married early, and she had two sons and one daughter.
