= Turkey Creek (New York) =

- Location of the mouth of Turkey Creek Turkey Creek (New York) (the United States)

Location
- Country: United States
- State: New York
- Region: Central New York
- County: Oneida
- Towns: Kirkland, Marshall

Physical characteristics
- Source
  - coordinates: 42°59′37″N 75°18′59″W
- Mouth: Oriskany Creek
  - location: Farmers Mills, Oneida County, New York
  - coordinates: 43°01′14″N 75°24′11″W
  - elevation: 659 ft (201 m)

Turkey Creek is a creek in Oneida County, New York. Turkey Creek flows into Oriskany Creek by Farmers Mills, New York.
