= Deansboro station =

Train depot in Deansboro, New York, U.S.

Deansboro
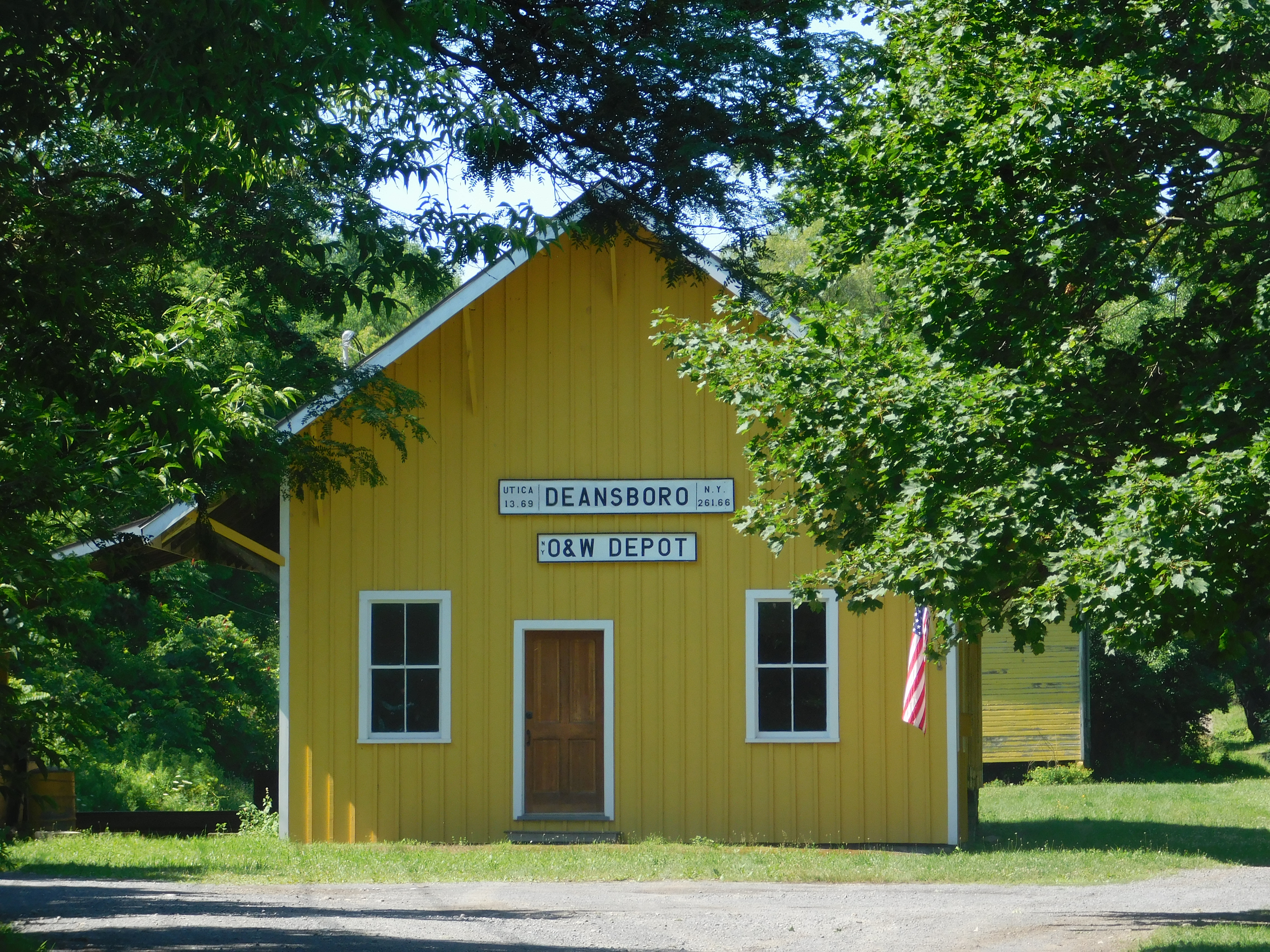
- Deansboro station in July 2020 after restoration

General information
- Location: 2707 Route 315, Deansboro, New York 13228

Former services
Preceding station	New York, Ontario and Western Railway	Following station
Orisanky Falls toward Randallsville	Randallsville – Utica	Franklin Springs toward Utica
- Deansboro Railroad Station
- U.S. National Register of Historic Places
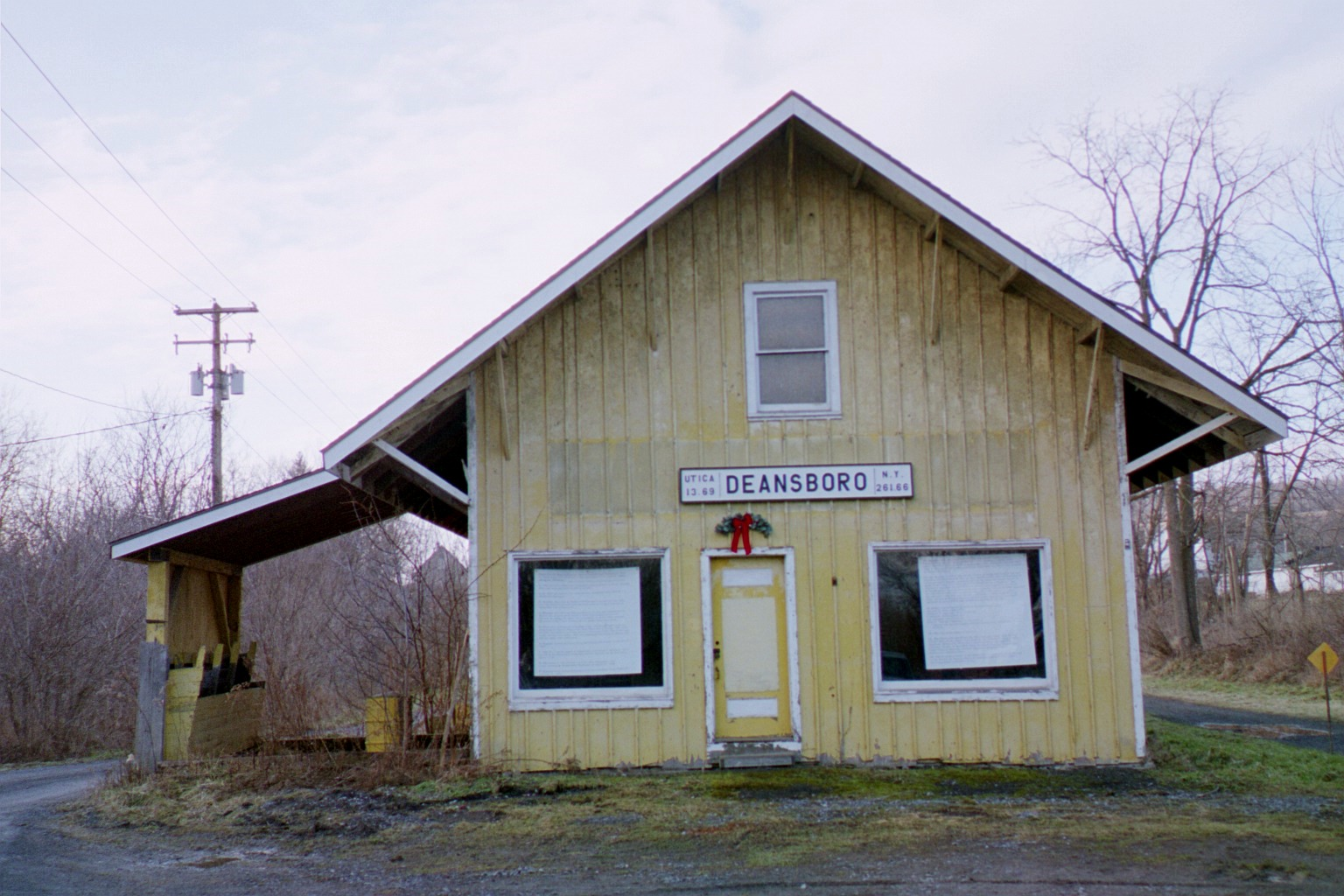
- The station prior to restoration.

- Location within New York Location within the United States
- Location: 2707 NY 315, Deansboro, New York
- Coordinates: 42°59′37″N 75°25′38″W
- Built: 1867
- Architectural style: Vernacular
- NRHP reference No.: 02001327
- Added to NRHP: November 15, 2002
Location

The Deansboro Railroad Station is a late nineteenth-century train depot in the hamlet of Deansboro in Oneida County, New York. It is historically significant for its role in the history of railroads in New York State and for its related characteristic architecture.

It was built by a predecessor railroad to the New York, Ontario and Western Railway. The depot is a one-story rectangular wood-frame building. It served the local community from 1867 until it was sold by the railroad in 1957.

It was listed on the National Register of Historic Places in 2002. There are plans to turn the depot into a museum.

== Gallery ==
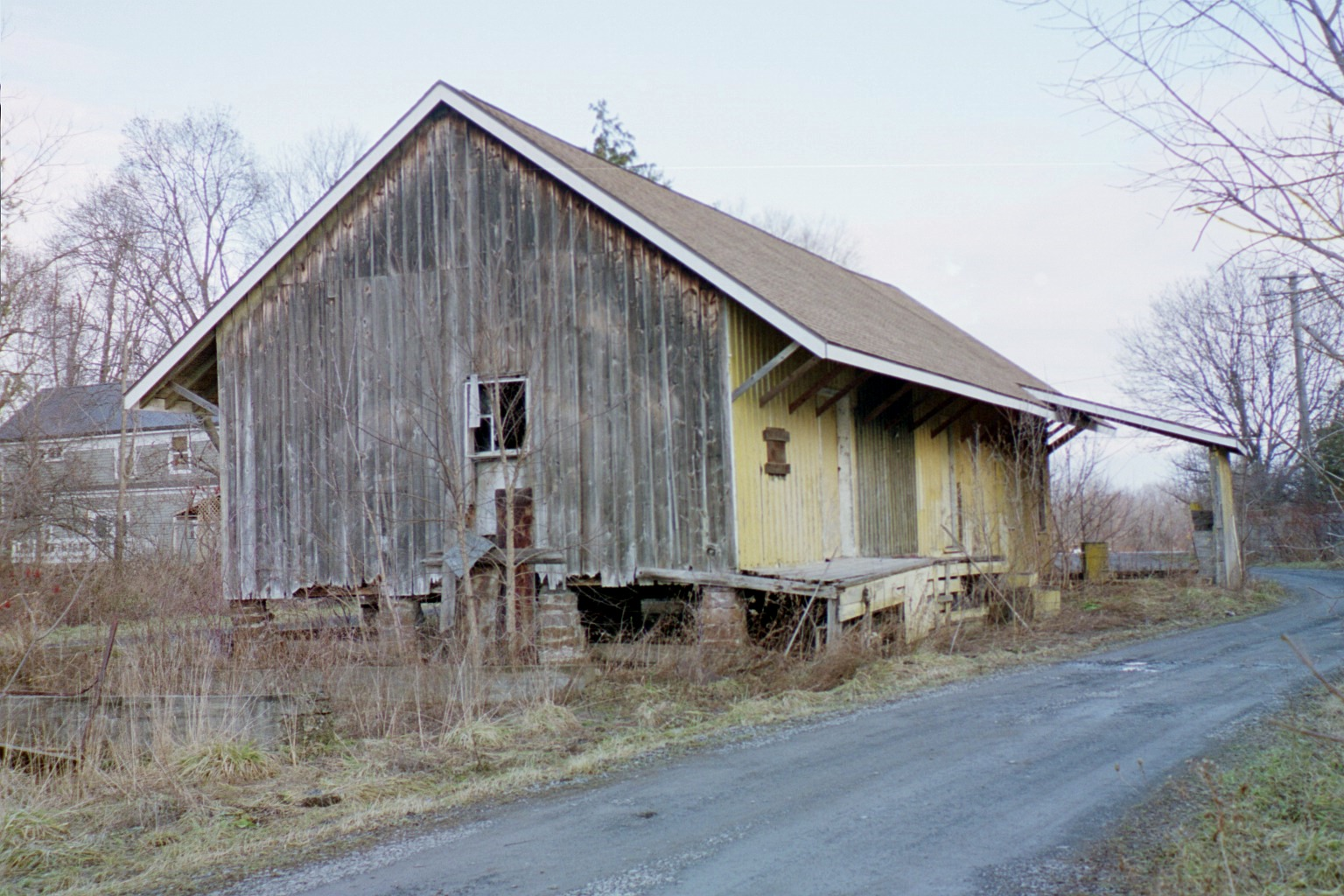
Rear view of Deansboro station
