= New York State Route 233 =

State highway in Oneida County, New York, US

New York State Route 233
- Map of Oneida County in central New York with NY 233 highlighted in red

Route information
- Maintained by NYSDOT
- Length: 12.04 mi (19.38 km)
- Existed: 1930–present

Major junctions
- South end: NY 12B near Clinton
- NY 5 in Westmoreland; I-90 Toll / New York Thruway in Westmoreland
- North end: NY 49 / NY 69 / NY 365 in Rome

Location
- Country: United States
- State: New York
- Counties: Oneida

Highway system
- New York Highways; Interstate; US; State; Reference; Parkways
← NY 232	→ NY 234

New York State Route 233 (NY 233) is a state highway in Oneida County, New York, United States. The southern terminus of the route is at an intersection with NY 12B southwest of the Clinton. Its northern terminus is at an interchange with the Utica–Rome Expressway within the Rome city limits but southeast of the inner tax boundary. NY 233 is the most direct connection between Rome and the New York State Thruway, which it meets at exit 32 in Westmoreland.

== Route description ==
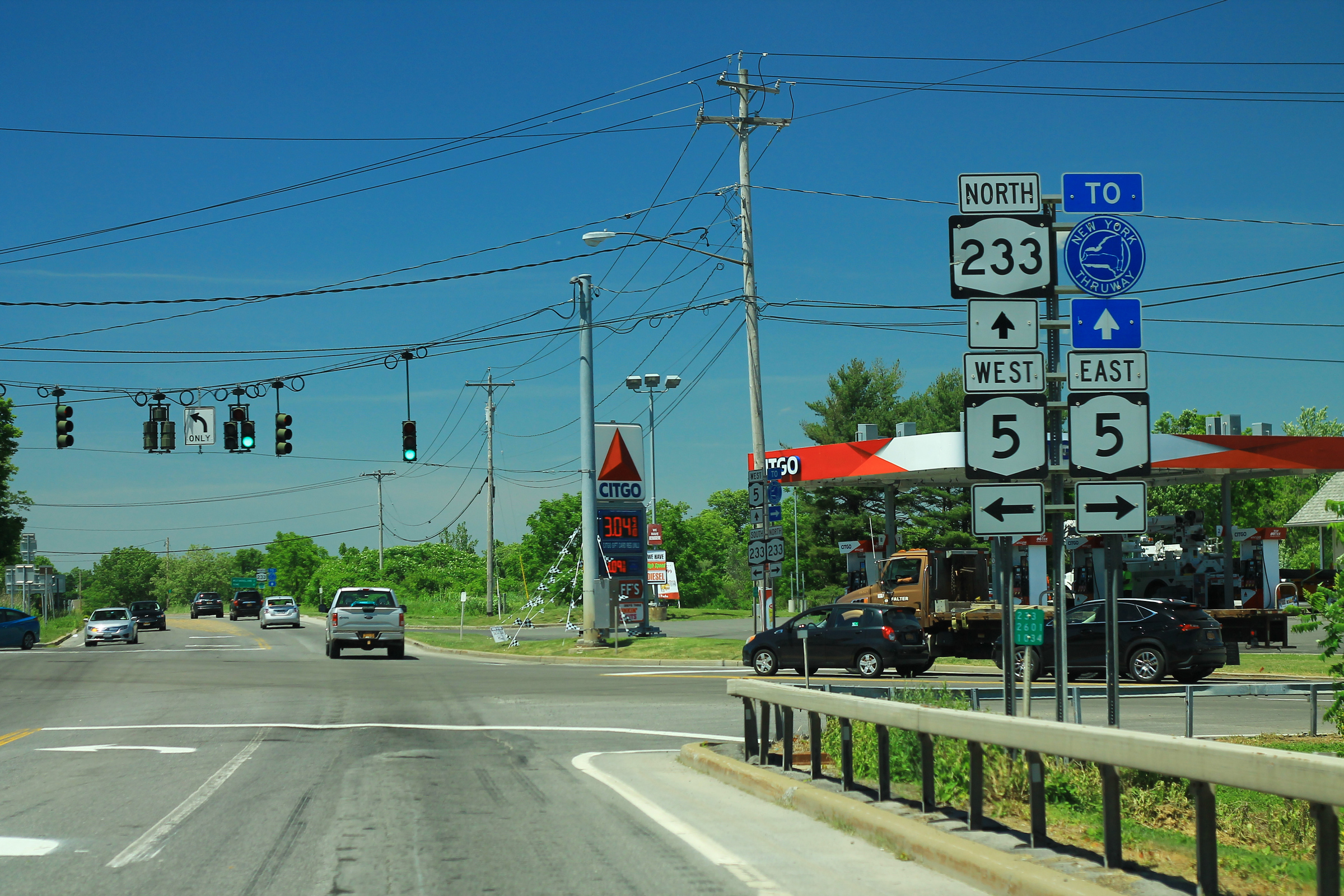
NY 233 at its junction with NY 5

NY 233 begins at an intersection with NY 12B southwest of the village of Clinton in the town of Kirkland. It heads north as Harding Road and passes the Harding Farm historic site before intersecting NY 412 (College Hill Road) directly west of Clinton. NY 412 heads east from here to serve Clinton while College Hill Road heads west to serve Hamilton College. North of the NY 412 junction, NY 233 is named Bristol Road as it passes through the hamlet of Kirkland (where it meets NY 5) and enters the town of Westmoreland. In the hamlet of Westmoreland, NY 233 meets the New York State Thruway (Interstate 90) at its exit 32. NY 233 does not directly connect to the exit ramps, making the connection instead by way of Cider Road. North of the interchange, the route becomes Rome–Westmoreland Road. Just before entering the large city of Rome, NY 233 cuts through the extreme northwestern corner of the town of Whitestown. Here, the route intersects County Route 840 (Sutliff Road), the county-maintained extension of NY 840. NY 233 continues into Rome to the hamlet of Stanwix and intersects NY 69 in the center of the community near where the Utica–Rome Expressway (NY 49 and NY 365) passes by Stanwix, with the connection between NY 233 and the eastbound direction of the expressway made via NY 69 eastbound. NY 69 joins NY 233 here, and both routes continue to the westbound on-ramps for the expressway. At this point, NY 69 turns west to join the expressway, while NY 233 ends.

== History ==
The alignment of NY 233 has remained virtually unchanged since the route was assigned as part of the 1930 renumbering of state highways in New York. It initially ended at a junction with NY 5S (now NY 69) in Rome (at Stanwix). The section of the Utica–Rome Expressway near Stanwix was constructed in the late 1970s, at which time NY 233 was extended a short distance along NY 69 to connect to an interchange with the expressway.

== Major intersections ==
The entire route is in Oneida County.

Location	mi	km	Destinations	Notes
Kirkland	0.00	0.00	NY 12B	Southern terminus
Kirkland	1.21	1.95	NY 412 east (College Street) / College Hill Road (NY 922C west) – Hamilton College	Western terminus of NY 412; eastern terminus of unsigned NY 922C; access to Hamilton College
Town of Westmoreland	3.47	5.58	NY 5 (Seneca Turnpike) – Vernon, New Hartford	
Town of Westmoreland	6.72	10.81	I-90 Toll / New York Thruway – Buffalo, Albany	Access via Cider Street; exit 32 on I-90 / Thruway
Rome	11.88	19.12	NY 69 east to NY 49 east / NY 365 east – Oriskany, Griffiss Park, Utica	Southern terminus of NY 69 overlap (northbound)
Rome	12.04	19.38	NY 49 west / NY 69 west / NY 365 west (Utica-Rome Expressway) – Downtown Rome, Oneida	Northern terminus; northern terminus of NY 69 overlap (northbound)
1.000 mi = 1.609 km; 1.000 km = 0.621 mi: Concurrency terminus
