= Grant Hill (New York) =

Mountain in New York, United States

- Location within New York Location within the United States

Highest point
- Elevation: 1,280 feet (390 m)
- Coordinates: 42°59′03″N 75°23′08″W

Geography
- Location: N of Waterville, New York, U.S.
- Topo map: USGS Oriskany Falls

Grant Hill is a summit located in Central New York Region of New York located in the Town of Marshall in Oneida County, north of Waterville.
