= Shenandoah =

Shenandoah may refer to:

== People ==
- Senedo people, a Native American tribe in Virginia
- Skenandoa or Shenandoah (1710–1816), Oneida Haudenosaunee chief
- Joanne Shenandoah (1958–2021), Oneida Haudenosaunee singer and acoustic guitarist

== Places ==
=== United States ===
==== Virginia and West Virginia ====
- Shenandoah, Virginia, a town in the state of Virginia
- Shenandoah County, Virginia, a county in the state of Virginia
- Shenandoah River, a river in Virginia and West Virginia
- Shenandoah Valley, the valley through which the aforementioned river runs
- Shenandoah Valley AVA, an American Viticultural Area in Virginia and West Virginia
- Shenandoah Mountain, a mountain ridge in Virginia and West Virginia
- Shenandoah National Park, a national park east of the Shenandoah Valley
- Shenandoah Historic District

=== Other US places ===
- Shenandoah (Miami), a neighborhood within the city of Miami, Florida
- Shenandoah, Iowa
- Shenandoah, Louisiana
- Shenandoah, New York
- Shenandoah, Pennsylvania
- Shenandoah Creek, a tributary of Mahanoy Creek in Pennsylvania
- Shenandoah, Texas
- Shenandoah, Houston, neighborhood of Houston, Texas
- California Shenandoah Valley AVA, an American Viticultural Area in California
- Shenandoah Peak, in Nevada, US
- Shenandoah station, an historic building located in Shenandoah, Iowa, United States

=== New Zealand ===
- Shenandoah River (New Zealand), a river in the South Island
- Shenandoah Highway or State Highway 65, in the South Island

== Transportation ==
=== Ships ===
- USS Shenandoah, several ships
- USNS Shenandoah (T-AO-181), an oiler laid down in 1964, renamed USNS Potomac (T-AO-181)
- CSS Shenandoah, an 1863 Confederate Navy screw steamer
- Shenandoah (schooner), a 1964 topsail schooner operated by Black Dog Tall Ships
- Shenandoah (1902), a schooner built in New York in 1902

=== Airships ===
- USS Shenandoah (ZR-1), an American naval rigid airship, broken up in a storm in 1925

=== Trains ===
- Shenandoah (B&O train), an American passenger train
- Shenandoah (Amtrak train), an American passenger train between Washington, DC, and Cincinnati, Ohio

== Arts and media ==
- "Oh Shenandoah", an episode of The Newsroom HBO series
- Shenandoah (film), a 1965 film starring James Stewart
- Shenandoah (musical), a 1974 Broadway musical based on the film
- Shenandoah (magazine), a literary magazine published by Washington and Lee University
- Shenandoah (play), an 1888 drama of the American Civil War by Bronson Howard
- Shenandoah: Daughter of the Stars, former title of the 2016 video game 1993 Space Machine
- A Man Called Shenandoah, a 1965–1966 Western television series

=== Music ===
- "Oh Shenandoah", a popular American folk song or sea shanty
- Shenandoah (band), a country music group
  - Shenandoah (album), their 1987 self-titled debut album
- Shenandoah, a band formed by Arlo Guthrie
- "Shen-an-doah", the closing song on Pitchshifter's 2002 album PSI

== Organizations ==
- Shenandoah Valley Academy, a parochial, college-preparatory boarding school in New Market, Virginia, US
- Confederate Army of the Shenandoah, during the American Civil War, US
- Union Army of the Shenandoah, during the American Civil War, US
- Shenandoah University, a university in Winchester, Virginia, US
- Museum of the Shenandoah Valley, also in Winchester, Virginia, US

== Games ==
- Shenandoah (wargame), a 1975 wargame simulating the 1862 and 1864 Valley campaigns of the American Civil War

== Other uses ==
- Shenandoah (beard), a type of beard
- Shenandoah Circuit, a race track at Summit Point Motorsports Park, West Virginia, US
- Shenandoah, garbage collector in Java Virtual Machine

== See also ==
- Shenandoah-Dives Mill, a former ore mill
- Operation Shenandoah, a 1966 operation in the Vietnam war
- Army of the Shenandoah (disambiguation)
- Shanendon Cartwright, Bahamian politician
