= Harding Farm =

Coordinates: 43.046602°N 75.398136°W

Harding Farm is a historic site west of the village of Clinton in Oneida County, New York, United States. It is located on New York State Route 233 (Harding Road) and is situated 0.4 miles (0.6 km) south of the junction of NY 233 and New York State Route 412.

It was built by Samuel Kirkland in 1793. Kirkland, missionary to the Oneida Indians and founder of Hamilton College, received 4,000 acres (1,600 ha) from the state of New York following the American Revolution. Colonists and Oneida people traveling the Oriskany Valley were frequent and welcome visitors. Oneida Chief Skenandoa, who had played a critical role in aiding the Colonists during the revolution, advised Kirkland on the ideal site to build his home. In 1816, Skenandoa requested to be buried next to Kirkland in the orchard behind Kirkland's house in order to "go up with him at the great resurrection." The bodies were later exhumed and moved to the Hamilton College cemetery. In 1851, Lyman S. Harding purchased the property and converted it to a dairy farm. In 1905, it was sold to Elihu Root, a native of nearby Clinton and Secretary of State for President Theodore Roosevelt. The Harding Family bought the property back in 1912 with considerably less land than it once had. Today, Harding Farm is a private residence.

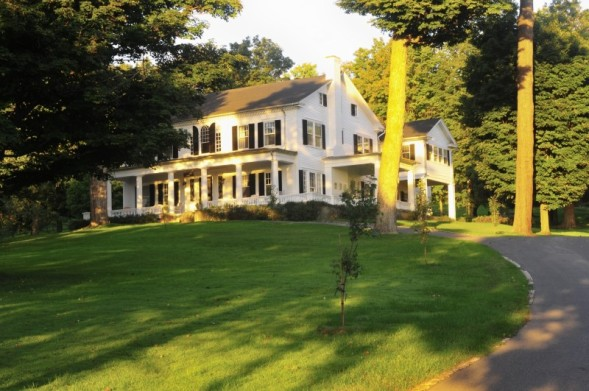
Main house at Harding Farm. Built by Kirkland in 1793

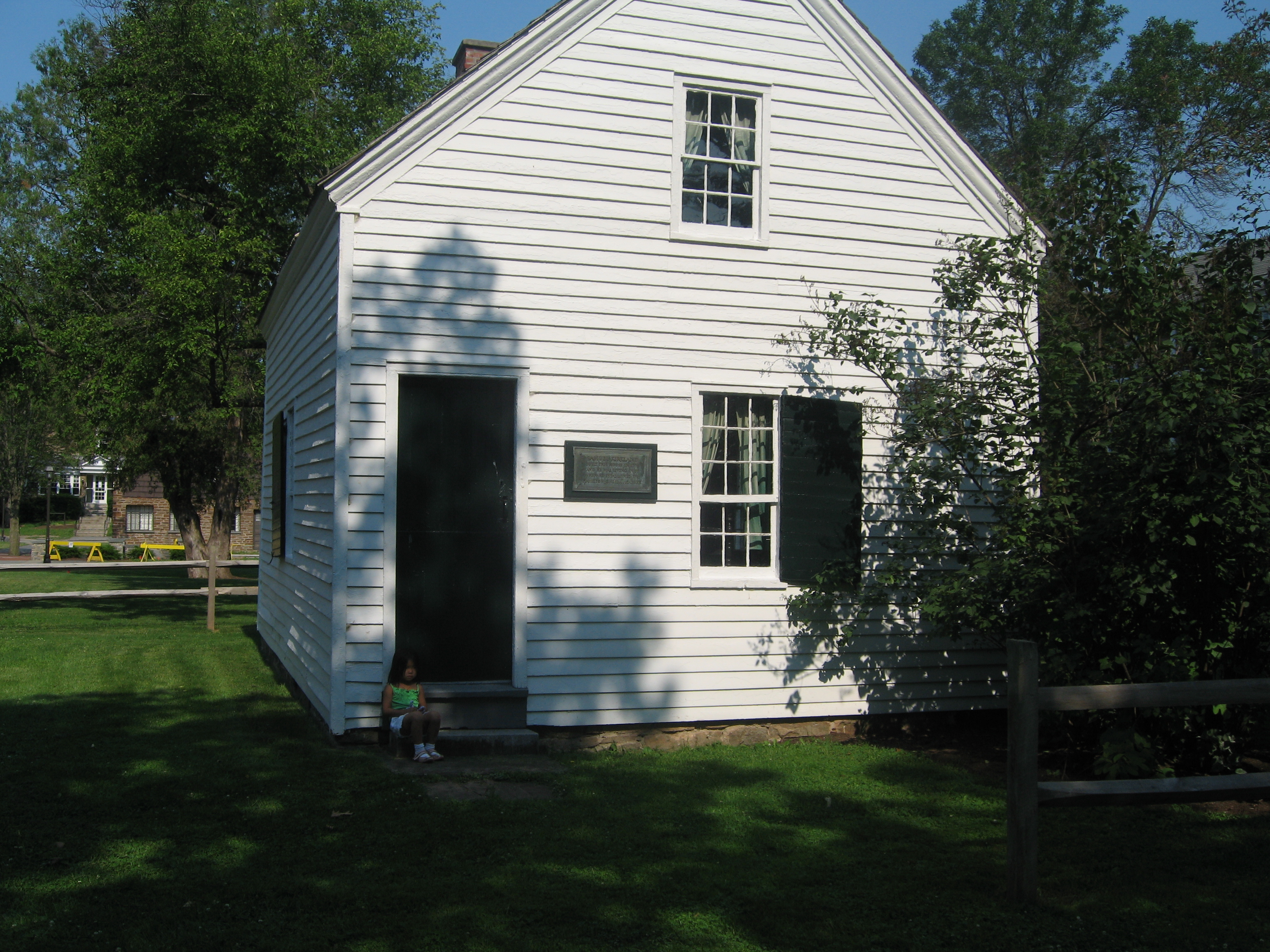
Samuel Kirkland's original cottage. Now located on the Hamilton College campus.
