= Rev. Asahel Norton Homestead =

Historic house in New York, United States

- U.S. National Register of Historic Places
- Location within New York Location within the United States
- Nearest city: Kirkland, New York
- Coordinates: 43°3′51″N 75°25′7″W
- Area: 8 acres (3.2 ha)
- Built: 1797
- Architectural style: Federal, Vernacular Federal
- NRHP reference No.: 85001546
- Added to NRHP: July 11, 1985

Rev. Asahel Norton Homestead is a historic home and farm complex located at Kirkland in Oneida County, New York.

The owner, Rev. Asahel Norton (Sept. 20, 1765-May 10, 1853) was a graduate of Yale College. He became known in later life for his interest in pomology, and for his apple trees. He was one of the founders of Hamilton College.

The home was built about 1797 and is a two-story wood-frame structure with a five bay, center hall configuration in a vernacular Federal style. Also on the property are the original well, chicken coop and animal barn, and fruit orchard.

The homestead was listed on the National Register of Historic Places in 1999.
