= New York State Route 315 =

State highway in Oneida County, New York, US

New York State Route 315
- Map of Oneida County in central New York with NY 315 highlighted in red

Route information
- Maintained by NYSDOT
- Length: 5.27 mi (8.48 km)
- Existed: 1930–present

Major junctions
- South end: NY 12 in Waterville
- North end: NY 12B in Marshall

Location
- Country: United States
- State: New York
- Counties: Oneida

Highway system
- New York Highways; Interstate; US; State; Reference; Parkways
← NY 314	→ NY 316

New York State Route 315 (NY 315) is a state highway in Oneida County, New York, in the United States. It begins at an intersection with NY 12 in the village of Waterville and ends at a junction NY 12B in the hamlet of Deansboro, located in the town of Marshall. NY 315 was assigned as part of the 1930 renumbering of state highways in New York.

== Route description ==
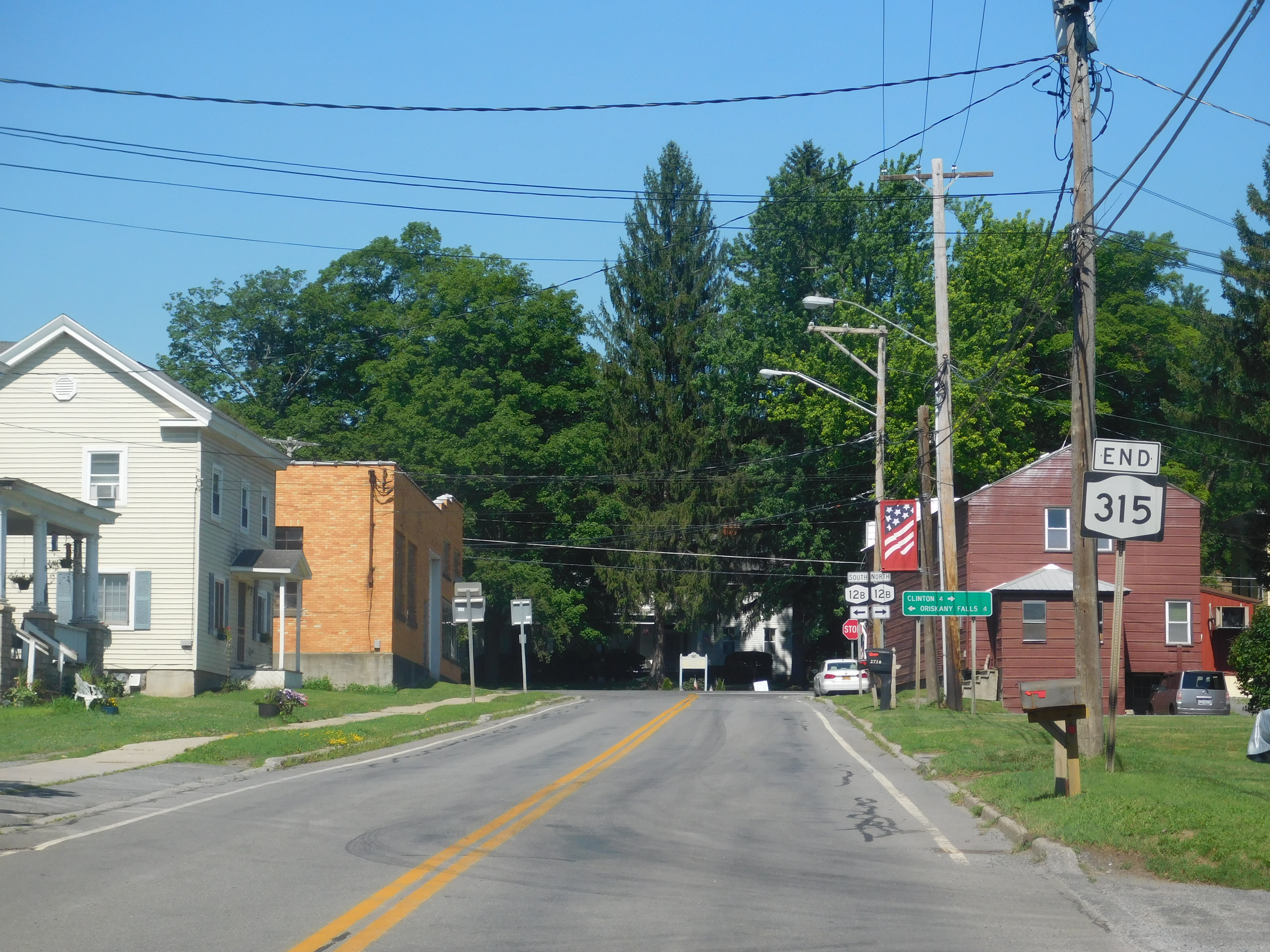
NY 315 approaching NY 12B in Deansboro

At the southern end, NY 315 begins in Waterville at an intersection with NY 12. Paralleling Big Creek, the route heads northwestward through mostly rural and residential land. The route, locally known as Buell Avenue along this stretch of its source, crosses several of the creek's tributaries as it progresses towards the hamlet of Deansboro, where it bends slightly westward and uneventfully terminates at NY 12B. Approximately midway between Waterville and Deansboro is Forge Hollow. Here, the road makes an S-shaped turn around Big Creek and one finds a rock face with caves and a natural spring. The entire route is five miles long.

== History ==
NY 315 was assigned to its current alignment during the 1930 state highway renumbering. Since then, it has not undergone any major alterations.

== Major intersections ==
The entire route is in Oneida County.

Location	mi	km	Destinations	Notes
Waterville	0.00	0.00	NY 12 – Utica, Sangerfield	Southern terminus
Marshall	5.27	8.48	NY 12B – Clinton, Oriskany Falls	Northern terminus; hamlet of Deansboro
1.000 mi = 1.609 km; 1.000 km = 0.621 mi
