= Army of the Shenandoah =

Army of the Shenandoah refers to two armies in the American Civil War:

- Confederate Army of the Shenandoah
- Union Army of the Shenandoah

== See also ==
- Shenandoah (disambiguation)
