= Waterville Triangle Historic District =

Historic district in New York, United States

- U.S. National Register of Historic Places
- U.S. Historic district
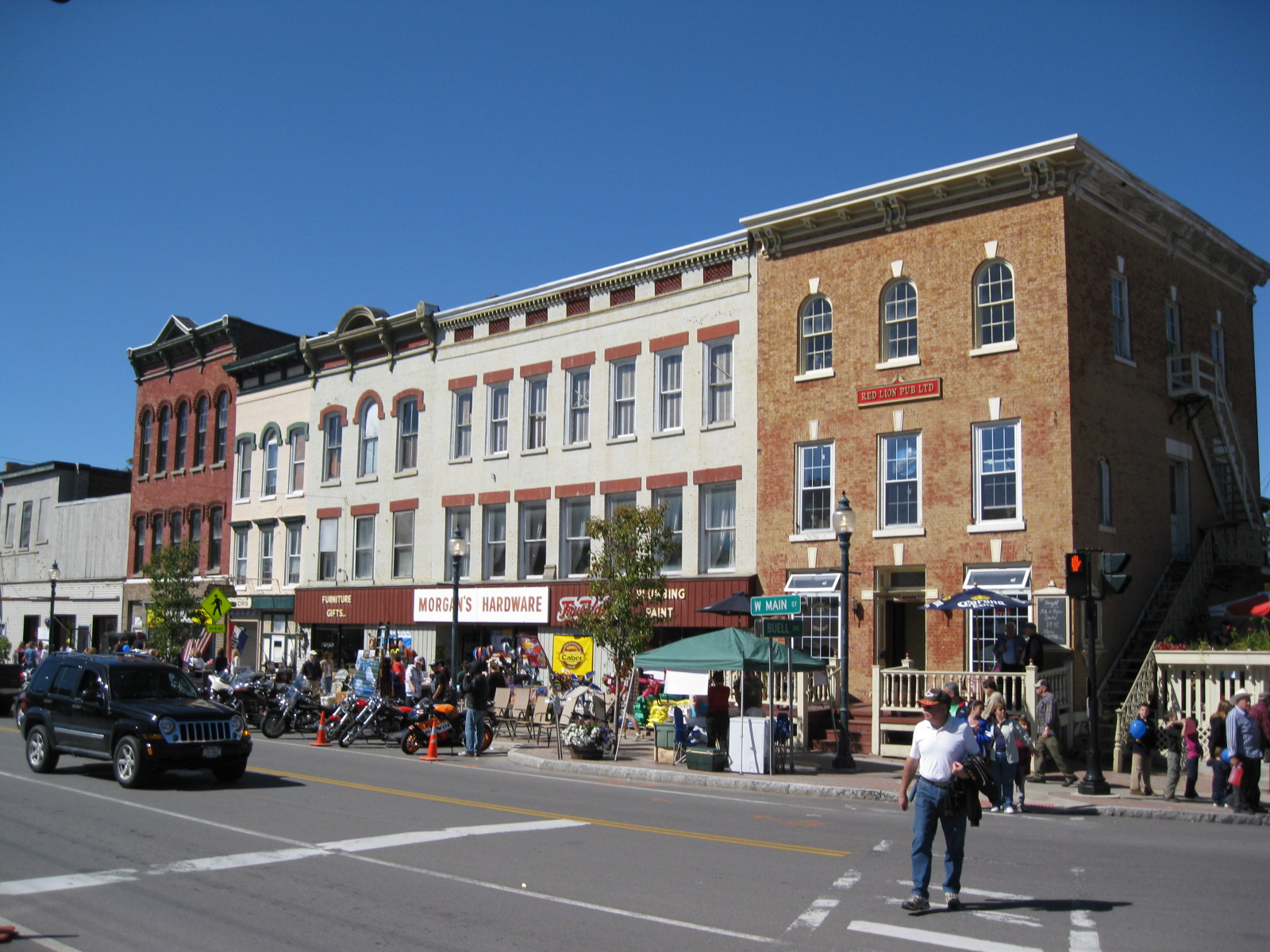
- Waterville Triangle Historic District, September 2009

- Location within New York Location within the United States
- Location: Stafford Ave., Main and White Sts., Waterville, New York
- Coordinates: 42°55′50″N 75°22′43″W
- Area: 27 acres (11 ha)
- Built: 1867
- Architect: Multiple
- NRHP reference No.: 78001888
- Added to NRHP: April 4, 1978

Waterville Triangle Historic District is a national historic district located at Waterville in Oneida County, New York. The district includes 59 contributing buildings and encompasses the heart of the village where three streets intersect to form a triangle. It includes buildings with a wide variety of architectural styles and whose worthy historical buildings span the period from 1820 to 1900.

It was listed on the National Register of Historic Places in 1978.
