= New York State Route 412 =

State highway in Oneida County, New York, US

New York State Route 412
- College Street
- Map of Oneida County in central New York with NY 412 highlighted in red and NY 922C in blue

Route information
- Maintained by NYSDOT
- Length: 0.75 mi (1,210 m)
- Existed: mid-1930s–present

Major junctions
- West end: NY 233 in Kirkland
- East end: NY 12B in Clinton

Location
- Country: United States
- State: New York
- Counties: Oneida

Highway system
- New York Highways; Interstate; US; State; Reference; Parkways
← NY 411	→ NY 413

New York State Route 412 (NY 412) is a state highway in Oneida County, New York, in the United States. It serves as a connector between NY 233, which bypasses the village of Clinton to the west, and NY 12B, which passes through the village. NY 412 is a two-lane highway its entire length. It was assigned in the mid-1930s, originally extending from the Hamilton College campus west of NY 233 to Clinton. It was cut back to its present length in the early 1950s.

== Route description ==
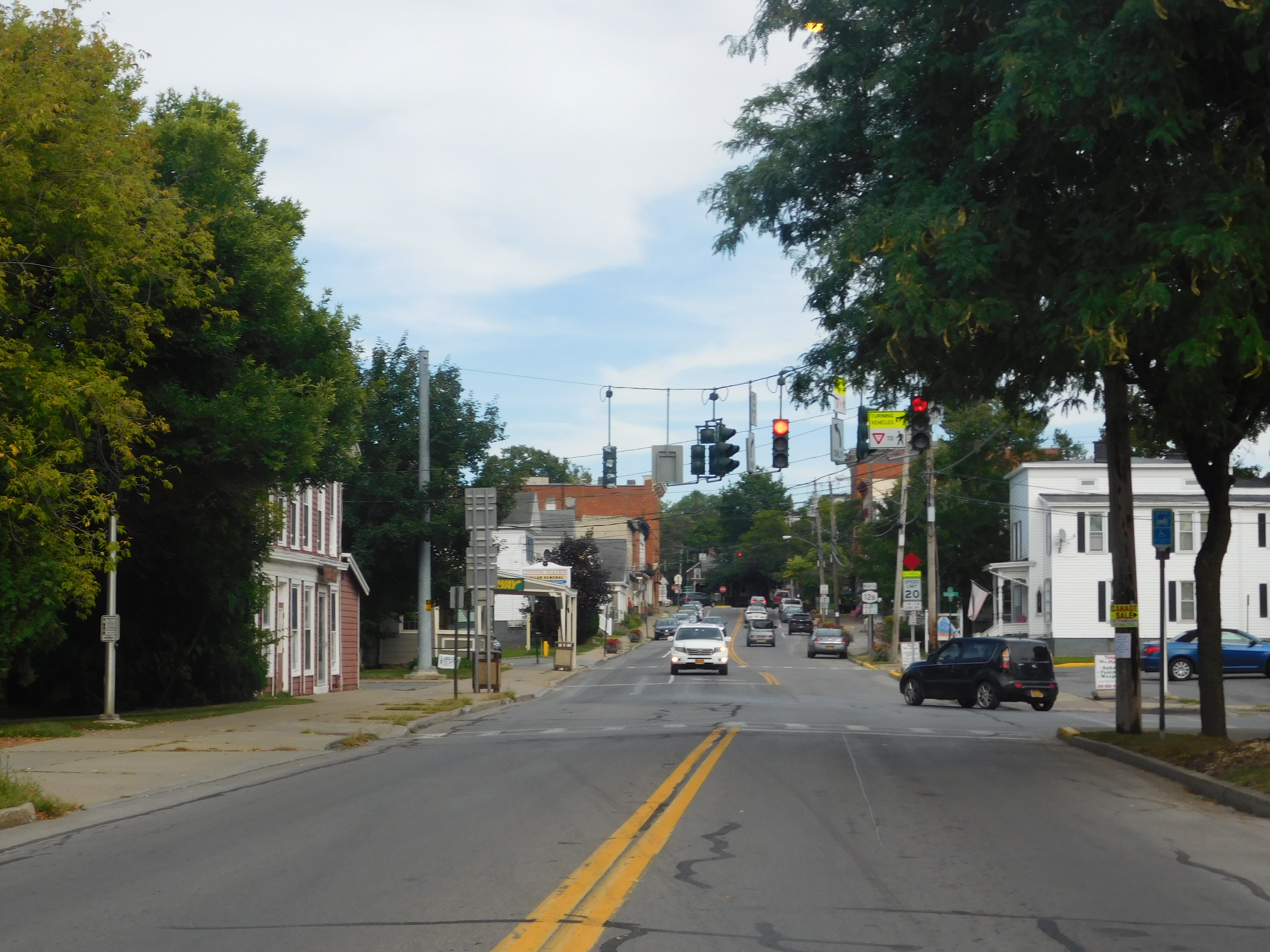
NY 412 heading eastbound toward NY 12B in Clinton

NY 412 begins at an intersection with NY 233 and College Hill Road (unsigned NY 922C) in the town of Kirkland just east of the Hamilton College campus. The route progresses eastward past a short strip of a residences as College Street before crossing over a creek and entering the village of Clinton. It continues to serve residential neighborhoods until it meets Chenango Avenue near the center of the village, at which the surroundings transition from residential to commercial. NY 412 ends one block later at a junction with NY 12B (Franklin Avenue). College Street continues east from this point as part of NY 12B.

== History ==
The state of New York assumed maintenance of the east–west roadway linking Hamilton College to the village of Clinton by 1926. It was designated NY 412 in the mid-1930s, serving as a posted connector between the college and NY 12B, the primary north–south road through the village. In the early 1950s, the route was truncated on its western end to its junction with NY 233 east of the campus. Most of NY 412's former routing to Hamilton College became part of County Route 13 by 1978; however, the easternmost 0.03 miles (0.05 km) is still state-maintained as NY 922C, an unsigned reference route.

== Major intersections ==
The entire route is in Oneida County.

Location	mi	km	Destinations	Notes
Kirkland	0.00	0.00	College Hill Road ( NY 922C) – Hamilton College	Continuation as College Hill Road; eastern terminus of unsigned NY 922C
Kirkland	0.00	0.00	NY 233	Western terminus
Clinton	0.75	1.21	NY 12B (Franklin Avenue)	Eastern terminus
1.000 mi = 1.609 km; 1.000 km = 0.621 mi
