= Deans Creek (Oriskany Creek tributary) =

Location
- Country: United States
- State: New York

Physical characteristics
- Source
  - coordinates: 43°00′56″N 75°27′41″W
- Mouth: Oriskany Creek
  - coordinates: 43°07′14″N 75°21′55″W
  - elevation: 459 ft (140 m)

Deans Creek is a river in the U.S. State of New York.
