= Skenandoa =

Oneida chief (c. 1706 – 1816)

John Skenandoa
- Shenandoah
- Born: c. 1706; Conestoga or Haudenosaunee
- Died: March 11, 1816 (aged 109–110); Oneida County, New York, U.S.
- Occupations: Chief, military leader

John Skenandoa (/ˌskɛnənˈdoʊə/; c. 1706 – March 11, 1816), also called Shenandoah (/ˌʃɛnənˈdoʊə/) among other forms, was an elected chief (a so-called "pine tree chief") of the Oneida. He was born into the Iroquoian-speaking Conestoga, but was adopted into the Oneida of the Haudenosaunee Confederacy. When he later accepted Christianity, he was baptized as "John", taking his Oneida name Skenandoa as his surname. Based on a possible reconstruction of his name in its original Oneida, he is sometimes called "Oskanondonha" in modern scholarship. His tombstone bears the spelling Schenando (/ˈʃɛnəndoʊ, ˈskɛn-/).

During the colonial years, Skenandoa supported the English against the French in the Seven Years' War. Later, during the American Revolutionary War, he supported the colonials and led a force of 250 Oneida and Tuscarora warriors in western New York in their support. He met George Washington, who wrote at least one letter of recommendation for him.

A longtime friend of the minister Samuel Kirkland, a founder of Hamilton College, his request to be buried next to Kirkland was granted. In the funeral procession at the death of Skenandoa together were Oneida, students and officers from Hamilton College, Kirkland's widow and her family, and many citizens of Clinton, New York.

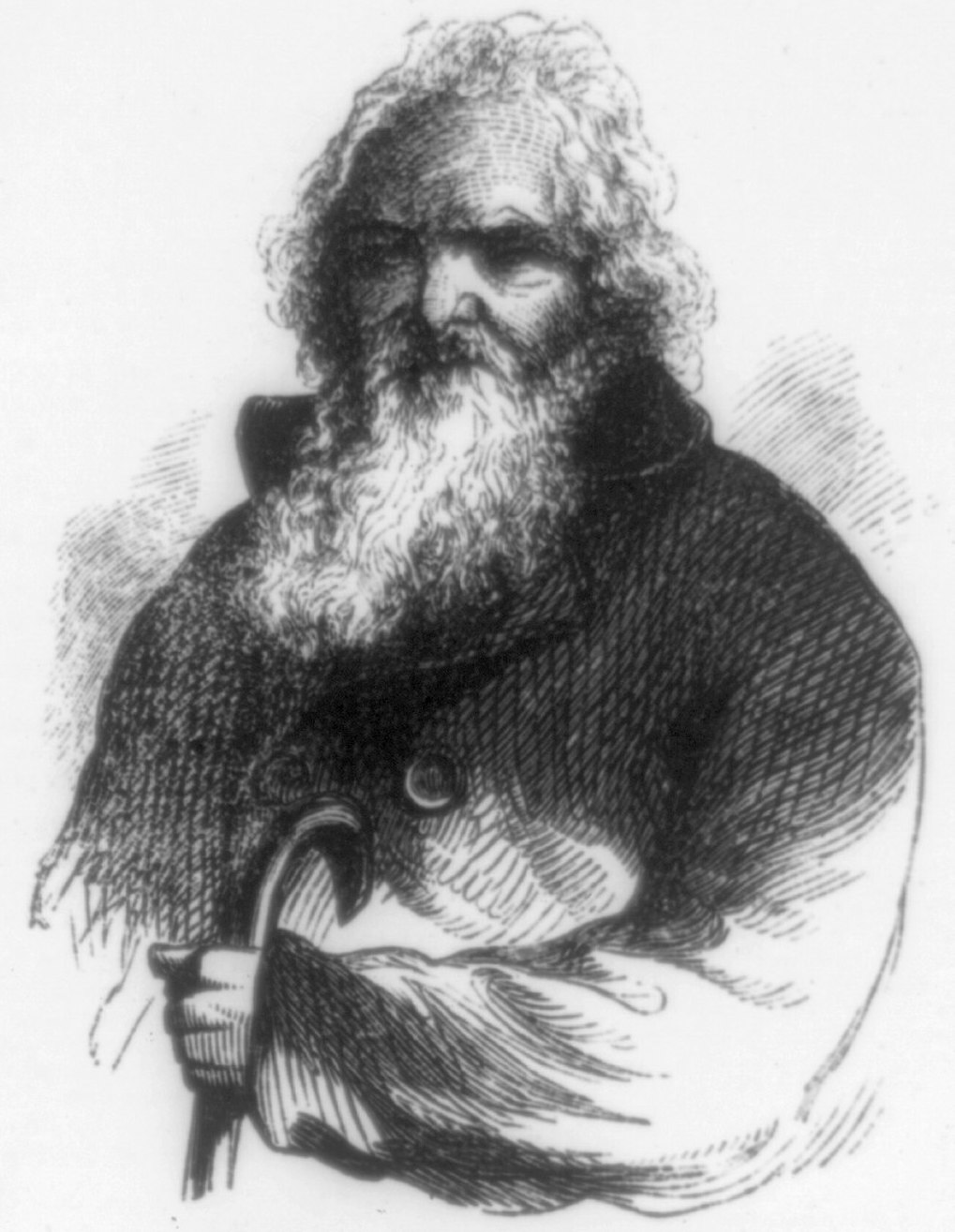

== Name ==
Skenandoa's name is variously recorded; "Shenandoah" has become the most famous form, used in many versions of the folk song "O Shenandoah", where the words "O Shenandoah, I love your daughter" and "The chief disdained the trader's dollars: / 'My daughter never you shall follow'" are found. Other forms include Skenandoah or Scanandoa; Schenandoah, Schenandoa, Shenondoa, Shanandoah, or Shanendoah; Skenando or Scanondo; Schenando; Skenandore; and Skennondon, Scanandon, Skonondon, or Skeanendon.

The origin of Skenandoa's name is uncertain. The spelling Oskanondonha (which was not recorded in his lifetime) assumes derivation from Oneida oskanu:tú: [oˌskanũːˈtũː], "deer". However, Skenandoa referred to himself as "an aged hemlock", and the Oneida word for "hemlock" is kanʌʔtú:saʔ [ˌkanə̃ʔˈtũːsaʔ]; this derivation has had a longer tradition of acceptance.

== Life ==
Skenandoa was born in 1706 into the Iroquoian-speaking Conestoga people (also called Susquehannock), located in present-day eastern Pennsylvania. He was adopted into the Oneida people, one of the Five Nations of the Haudenosaunee Confederacy.

As an adult man, he was notable for his height, estimated to be 6'5," and was said to have a commanding presence. The Oneida elected him as a "Pine Tree Chief", in recognition of his leadership and contribution to the tribe. This position allowed him a place in the Grand Council of 50 royaner of the Confederacy, representing all the clans of all the nations. It was not hereditary, nor could Skenandoa name a successor. The name referred to a man being recognized as a chief and rising up inside the tribe.

During the Seven Years' War (also called the French and Indian War in the Thirteen Colonies), Skenandoa favored the British against the French and led the Oneida in their support in central New York. He was said to have saved German colonists in German Flatts, in the Mohawk Valley, from a massacre.

During the next decades, he formed more alliances with the ethnic German and British colonists in central and western New York.

Samuel Kirkland, a Protestant missionary who went to the Haudenosaunee country of western New York in 1764, encountered Skenandoa there and mentioned him in letters. Kirkland returned to the area in 1766 and worked with the Oneida for the remainder of his life. After Kirkland persuaded the chief to become baptized, Skenandoa took the name "John". Many of the Oneida converted to Christianity in the decade before the American Revolutionary War.

In part due to the friendship with Kirkland, Skenandoa favored the patriot colonials and led the Oneida to be their allies during the American Revolutionary War. Skenandoa led many Oneida to fight against the British and their Haudenosaunee allies, who came from four nations of the Confederacy. Skenandoa commanded 250 warriors from the Oneida and Tuscarora tribes. In the 1800s New York Governor Daniel D. Tompkins gave him a silver pipe in recognition of his contributions. Today it is displayed at Shako:wi, the Oneida Nation museum at their reservation near Syracuse.

Mohawk war leader Joseph Brant, who allied with the British during the revolution, had Skenandoa jailed at Fort Niagara for a period in 1779 during the war when the Oneida chief was on a peace mission to the Haudenosaunee.

Skenandoa lived what appears to be past the age of 100. Nearing the end of his life and having gone blind, the chief is recorded as having said:

I am an aged hemlock. I am dead at the top. The winds of an hundred winters have whistled through my branches. Why my Jesus keeps me here so long, I cannot conceive. Pray ye to him, that I may have patience to endure till my time may come.

After Skenandoah died in 1816 at well over a hundred years old, he was buried upon his request (and with the Kirkland family's approval) next to his friend Kirkland, who had died in 1808, on the grounds of Kirkland's home in Clinton, New York. Today the property is known as Harding Farm. As a measure of the respect for the chief, the procession at his funeral in 1816 included students and officers from Hamilton College, the widow Mrs. Kirkland and other members of her family, and numerous town residents, in addition to his son and members of his family and nation. In 1851, both bodies were reinterred in the cemetery of Hamilton College.

== Legacy and honors ==
The Oneida oral tradition tells that Chief Skenandoa provided critical food, sending corn to General George Washington and his men during their harsh winter at Valley Forge in 1777–1778. Washington is said to have named the Shenandoah River and valley in his honor, and subsequently numerous other places in the United States were named Shenandoah. He is also referred to in the title and lyrics of the folk song "Oh Shenandoah".

A monument to Skenandoa was erected by the Northern Missionary Society at the Hamilton College cemetery. Its inscription recognizes his leadership, friendship with Kirkland, and important contributions to the rebel colonists during the war.

In 2002 he was inducted into the Hall of Fame of the Oneida County Historical Society.

The Oneida performer-composer Joanne Shenandoah (1957–2021) was a descendant of Chief Shenandoah.
