= Pleasant Valley Grange Hall =

- U.S. National Register of Historic Places
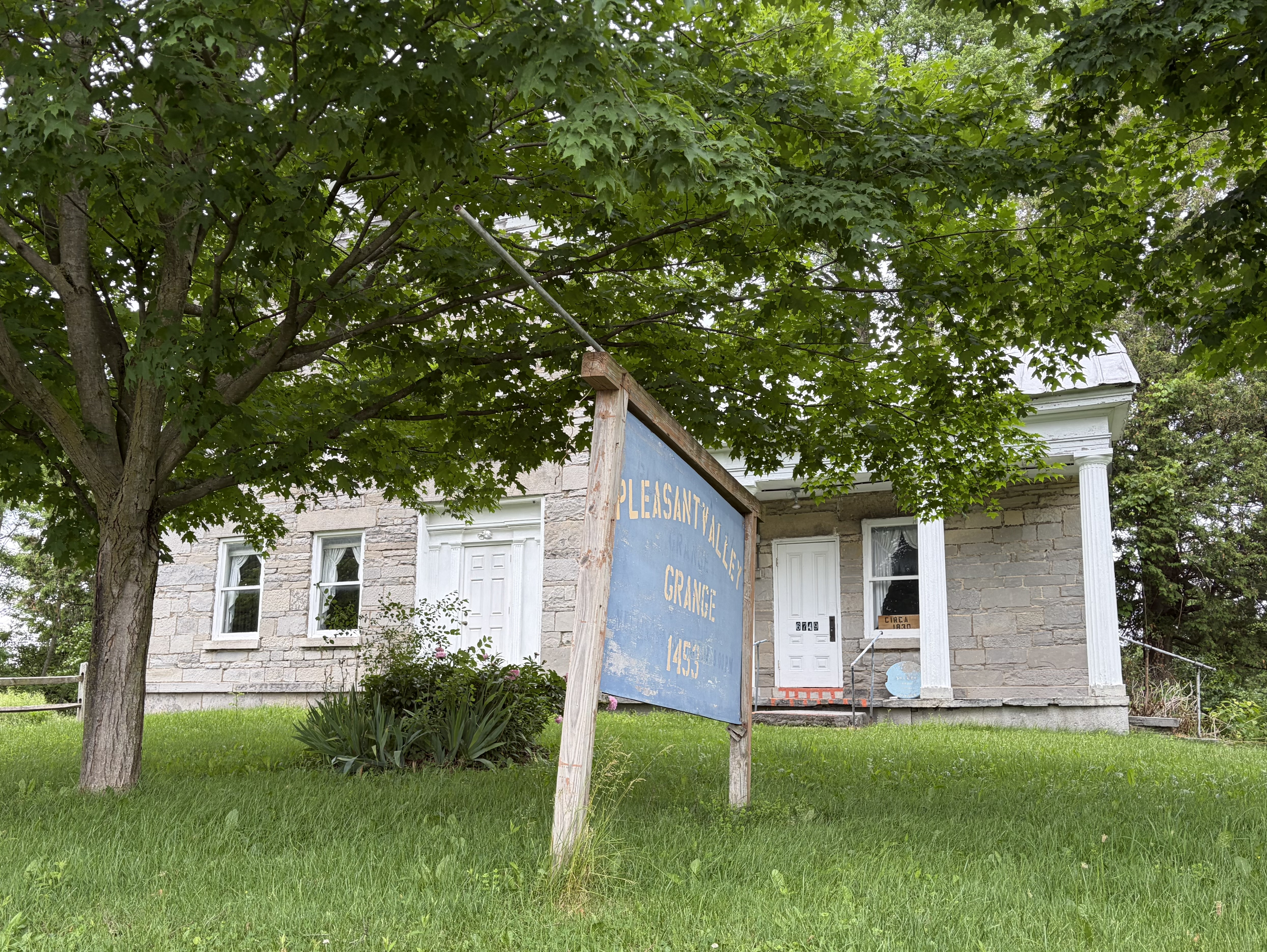
- The Grange Hall in 2026

- Location within New York Location within the United States
- Nearest city: Sangerfield, New York
- Coordinates: 42°55′02″N 75°26′24″W
- Area: less than one acre
- Built: 1830
- Architectural style: Greek Revival
- NRHP reference No.: 99000058
- Added to NRHP: February 12, 1999

Pleasant Valley Grange Hall is a historic Grange Hall located in the hamlet of Pleasant Valley, which is in the town of Sangerfield in Oneida County, New York. It was built about 1830 as a farmhouse. It consists of a rectangular, 2 1/2-story, gable-roofed limestone main block with a 1-story service wing. There is also a 1-story gable-roofed frame wing. It has been used as a Grange Hall since 1922.

It was listed on the National Register of Historic Places in 1999.
