= Utica Station =

Utica Station may refer to:

- Union Station (Utica, New York), an Amtrak station listed on the NRHP
- Utica (Metro Rail), a subway station in Buffalo, New York
- Utica Station (Illinois), a railroad station in North Utica, Illinois; demolished in 2004
