= Waterville, New York =

- Village
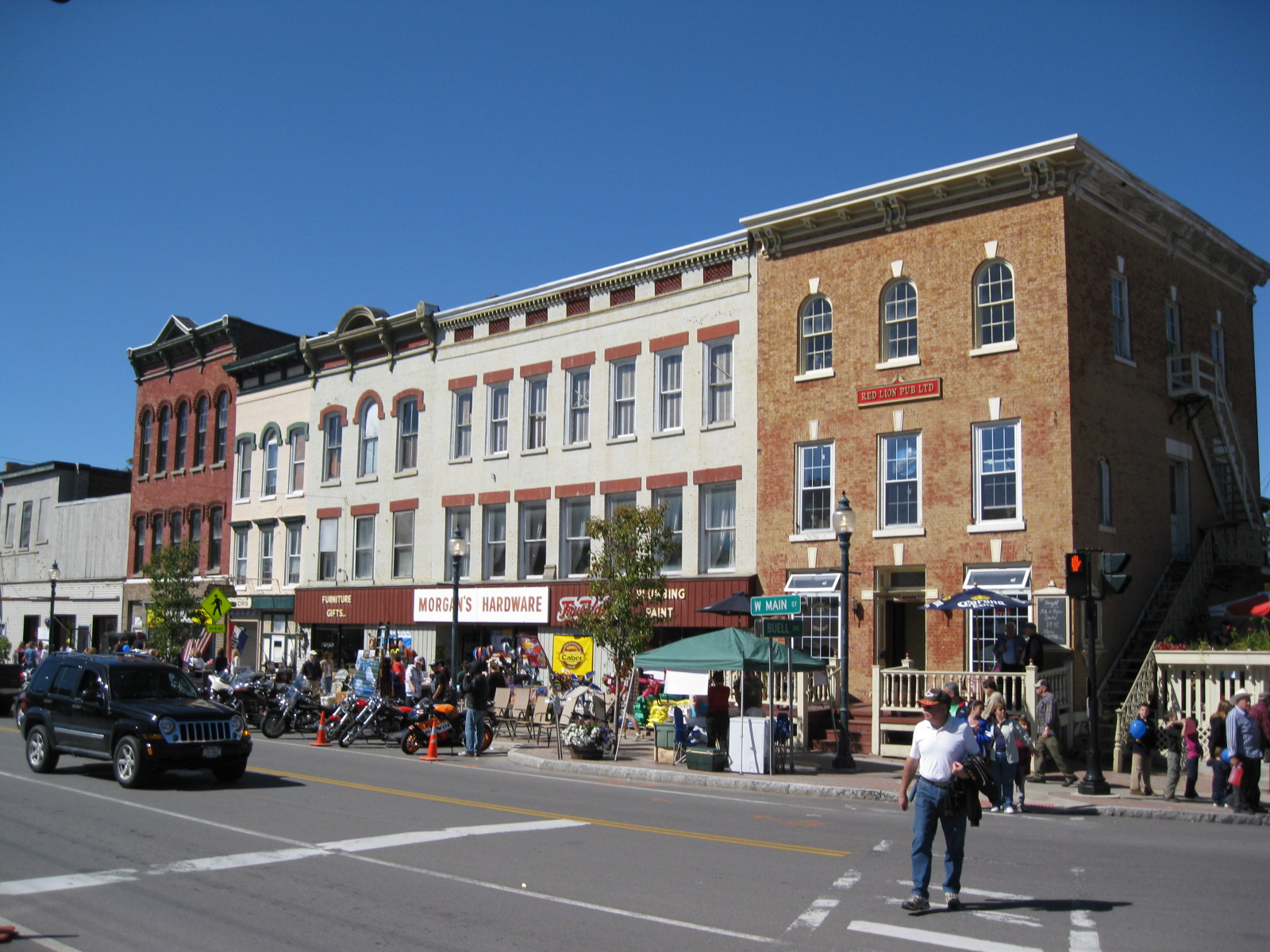
- The Waterville Triangle Historic District.

- Location in Oneida County and the state of New York.
- Coordinates: 42°55′54″N 75°22′36″W
- Country: United States
- State: New York
- County: Oneida

Area
  - Total: 1.42 sq mi (3.67 km^{2})
  - Land: 1.42 sq mi (3.67 km^{2})
  - Water: 0 sq mi (0.00 km^{2})
- Elevation: 1,201 ft (366 m)

Population (2020)
  - Total: 1,473
  - Density: 1,040.3/sq mi (401.68/km^{2})
- Time zone: UTC-5 (Eastern (EST))
  - Summer (DST): UTC-4 (EDT)
- ZIP code: 13480
- Area code: 315
- FIPS code: 36-78663
- GNIS feature ID: 0968917
- Website: villageofwaterville.gov

Waterville (called Ska-na-wis, "long swamp" by the Haudenosaunee) is a village in Oneida County, New York, United States. According to the 2020 census, its population was 1,473.

== History ==
Long the traditional territory of the Iroquoian-speaking Oneida people of the Haudenosaunee, the Waterville area was first settled by European Americans circa 1792 after the United States' victory in the American Revolutionary War. The US forced the Iroquois Confederacy to cede most of its land in New York state. The settlement was known as "The Huddle". In 1808, the settlement formally took the name of Waterville. The village is named after Waterville, Maine.

Hops (humulus lupulus) were introduced to the area in about 1820; by 1875, Waterville was considered the "Hops Capital of the World." Several inventions related to the cultivation and curing of hops were developed locally, the most important of which was liquid hop extract. The International Hop Stock Exchange was established in the 1860s.

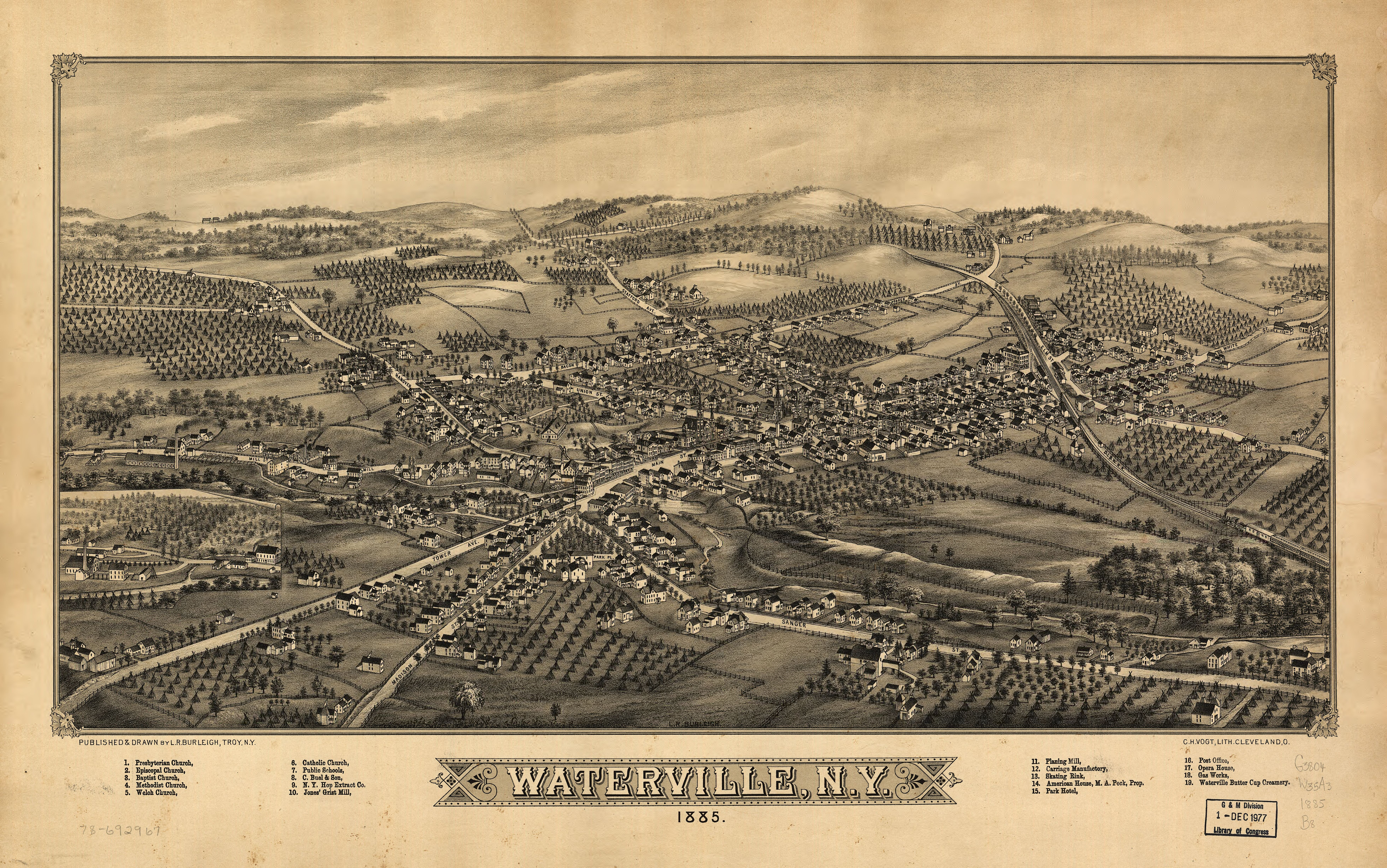
Perspective map of Waterville from 1885 with list of landmarks by L.R. Burleigh

With the introduction of railway service in 1867, chiefly the Delaware, Lackawanna and Western Railroad, Waterville became a major shipping point for hops-related cargo; "Waterville Hops" and hop extract were shipped to brewers all over the world. The economic prosperity fueled by the hop industry was reflected by merchants building fine Victorian-style homes. By the 1920s, hop production began to wane, due primarily to poor agricultural technology. By the close of the 1940s, Waterville's working hop farms had all been converted to other uses. Some locals continue to grow hops as a recreational "tip of the hat" to Waterville's past.

The Loomis Gang, a notorious group of horse thieves, lived and operated in the Waterville area during the mid-nineteenth century. Beyond documented history, there is much folklore associated with the Loomis family, including legends of ghosts that haunt the Nine Mile Swamp area located one mile south of Waterville.

Also of interest is the former home of George Eastman, the father of the Kodak Company. Kodak made, and continues to make, high-quality cameras and accessories. The parking lot across from St. Bernard's Church is the approximate site of Eastman's former residence.

== Geography ==
Waterville is located at 42°55′54″N 75°22′36″W (42.931591, -75.376538).

The village of Waterville is on the border of the towns of Marshall and the Sangerfield in Oneida County.

New York State Route 12 runs north–south through the center of town, where it intersects state route 315. One mile south of the village, U.S. Route 20 runs east–west and intersects Route 12 in Sangerfield.

According to the United States Census Bureau, the village has a total area of 1.3 square miles (3.4 km^{2}), all land except Big Creek, a tributary to the Oriskany Creek that runs through the center of town crossing under Sanger Avenue (Route 12) and paralleling Buell Avenue (Route 315). Rolling hills, farmland, and mixed forests are found in the surrounding area. Other nearby bodies of water include Chittening Pond, Bailey Lake, Gorton Lake, the Waterville Reservoirs (headwaters of Big Creek) and the Nine Mile Swamp.

The nearest city, Utica, lies approximately fifteen miles north of the village. At 1,200 feet MSL, the village is at a higher elevation than Utica, which is located in the Mohawk River Valley. By Route 20, Waterville is approximately sixty miles east of Syracuse and eighty miles west of Albany.

To the east of the village is Tassel Hill, the highest point in Oneida County at 1,945 feet above sea level. Tassel Hill is located in the Tassel Hill State Forest, which offers all-season recreational opportunities such as camping, hiking, biking, ATV-riding, and snowmobiling. Nearby is the Albert J. Woodford State Forest.

== Demographics ==
Historical population
Census	Pop.	Note	%±
1890	2,024		—
1900	1,571		−22.4%
1910	1,410		−10.2%
1920	1,255		−11.0%
1930	1,298		3.4%
1940	1,489		14.7%
1950	1,634		9.7%
1960	1,901		16.3%
1970	1,808		−4.9%
1980	1,672		−7.5%
1990	1,664		−0.5%
2000	1,721		3.4%
2010	1,583		−8.0%
2020	1,473		−6.9%
U.S. Decennial Census

As of the census of 2000, there were 1,721 people, 626 households, and 435 families residing in the village. The population density was 1,297.8 inhabitants per square mile (501.1/km^{2}). There were 673 housing units at an average density of 507.5 per square mile (195.9/km^{2}). The racial makeup of the village was 98.08% White, 0.46% African American, 0.29% Native American, 0.58% Asian, 0.06% Pacific Islander, and 0.52% from two or more races. Hispanic or Latino of any race were 0.81% of the population.

There were 626 households, out of which 38.7% had children under the age of 18 living with them, 50.0% were married couples living together, 16.6% had a female householder with no husband present, and 30.5% were non-families. 26.2% of all households were made up of individuals, and 14.7% had someone living alone who was 65 years of age or older. The average household size was 2.60 and the average family size was 3.09.

In the village, the population was spread out, with 27.9% under the age of 18, 7.8% from 18 to 24, 25.2% from 25 to 44, 20.5% from 45 to 64, and 18.7% who were 65 years of age or older. The median age was 38 years. For every 100 females, there were 80.4 males. For every 100 females age 18 and over, there were 70.7 males.

The median income for a household in the village was $37,563, and the median income for a family was $46,761. Males had a median income of $32,009 versus $23,333 for females. The per capita income for the village was $17,219. About 8.6% of families and 12.3% of the population were below the poverty line, including 15.0% of those under age 18 and 12.8% of those age 65 or over.

== Economy ==
=== Industry ===
The Waterville Knitting Mill produced textiles until the early 1980s. In 1969, the Waterville Knitting Mill built a new building around the corner from their original building. In 2009, the original Knitting Mill was torn down due to dangerous conditions within the building and trespassing. In 1995, C & H Plastics, a custom thermoplastic injection molding facility founded in 1970, bought the newer facility on Conger Avenue and renovated it. It continues to operate to this day. Dairy farming remains an important industry in the greater Waterville area.

=== Community development and renewal ===
Recent infrastructure development has included a new Municipal Hall (2002), and state-of-the-art Waterville Public Library with formal gardens (2006) and 19 kW photovoltaic solar array (2009) and croquet lawn (2017). From 2005 to 2006, the Village underwent major thoroughfare reconstruction under the auspices of the New York State Department of Transportation. The project included new sidewalks, decorative red brick paving, granite curbing and newly planted trees along Main Street; Victorian street lamps line Main Street and Sanger Avenue (NYS Rt. 12). Donated by the Rotary Club of Waterville, a decorative town clock adorns the corner of Main Street and White Street in the center of the Village . Upgraded sewer lines have helped curb pollution of the Waterville Creek. In 2009–10, funded by private donations, a Victorian-era bandstand was erected in the Village Park. The Barton-Brown Observatory, a joint venture of the Waterville Public Library and Mohawk Valley Astronomical Society, opened in 2012 on the grounds of the Library. The Observatory houses two large, research grade telescopes and hosts monthly stargazing events open to the public.

== Arts and culture ==
=== Annual cultural events ===
The Waterville Volunteer Fire Department used to host an annual "Field Days", which was typically held on the third weekend of July, featuring a parade, amusement rides and fireworks. The "Cruisin' Into Waterville" festival has been held in Waterville every Fall since 2005, commemorating the completion of the Route 12 renovations in the village.

=== Tourism ===
The Waterville Triangle Historic District was listed on the National Register of Historic Places in 1978. The Tower Homestead and Masonic Temple was listed in 1977.

The Waterville Public Library is a hub of cultural activity, presenting an array of film, music, art and educational events and programs.

The Waterville Historical Society on East Main Street houses a museum of local history exhibits.

== Education ==
The Waterville Central School District, the school district of the village, serves several communities in the area including Deansboro, North Brookfield, Oriskany Falls, and Sangerfield. The district has two buildings including Memorial Park Elementary School for grades K-6 (located on East Bacon Street), and Waterville Jr/Sr High School for grades 7-12 (located on Madison Street).

Colleges within twenty-five miles include Hamilton College, Colgate University, Utica University, SUNY IT, and Mohawk Valley Community College.

== Notable people ==
- Frank Lusk Babbott (1854–1933), jute merchant, art patron/collector, philanthropist
- Charlotte B. Coman (1833-1924), painter
- George Cushman (born 1991), racing driver
- George Eastman (1854–1932), inventor, philanthropist, founder of Eastman Kodak
- Claude Fuess (1885–1963), author, historian, educator, and 10th Headmaster of Phillips Academy in Andover, Massachusetts.
- John Stoughton Newberry (1826-1887), U.S. Congressman
- Charlemagne Tower (1809–1889), lawyer, soldier, industrialist
