= Oriskany Creek =

River in New York, United States

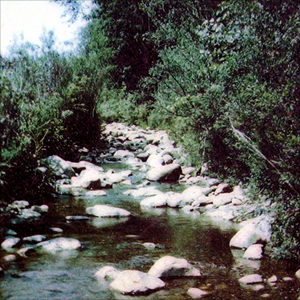
- The site of a patriot ambush during the Battle of Oriskany at Oriskany Creek

- Location of the mouth of the Oriskany Creek in New York State. Oriskany Creek (the United States)

Location
- Country: United States
- State: New York
- Counties: Madison, Oneida

Physical characteristics
- Source
  - location: Stockbridge, Madison County
  - coordinates: 42°57′36″N 75°33′17″W
- Mouth: Mohawk River
  - location: Whitestown, Oneida County
  - coordinates: 43°09′50″N 75°19′26″W
- Length: 33 mi (53 km)

Basin features
- Tributaries
  - left: Deans Creek
  - right: White Creek, Turkey Creek, Big Creek, Buckley Mill Creek

Oriskany Creek is a 33-mile-long (53 km) river in New York, United States. It rises in Madison County and flows northeastward, primarily through Oneida County. Oriskany Creek is a tributary of the Mohawk River and therefore part of the Hudson River watershed.

Oriskany Creek is wide and shallow, affording passage to only canoes, and that for only part of its length. The creek is known for its brown trout, which are caught from the shore or by wading.

== History ==
The Oneida village of Oriskany was located near the mouth of the creek, by the Mohawk River.

During the American Revolutionary War, part of the Battle of Oriskany was fought in a swampy, steep ravine, near the mouth of the river.

When settlers arrived, the creek became the power source of many mills along its course.

The creek was an important source of water for the former Chenango Canal, which linked the Southern Tier of New York to the Erie Canal.

== Communities along the creek ==
- Clark Mills
- Clinton
- Colemans Mills
- Deansboro
- Farmers Mills
- Kirkland
- Oriskany
- Oriskany Falls
- Solsville
- Walesville

== See also ==
- List of rivers in New York
