= Shenandoah Peak =

Summit

Coordinates: 37°30′00″N 117°02′24″W

Shenandoah Peak is a summit in the U.S. state of Nevada. The elevation is 5,846 feet (1,782 m).

A variant name is "Shenandoah Mountain". The name is a transfer from the Shenandoah Valley, in Virginia.
