= Sangerfield, New York =

- Town
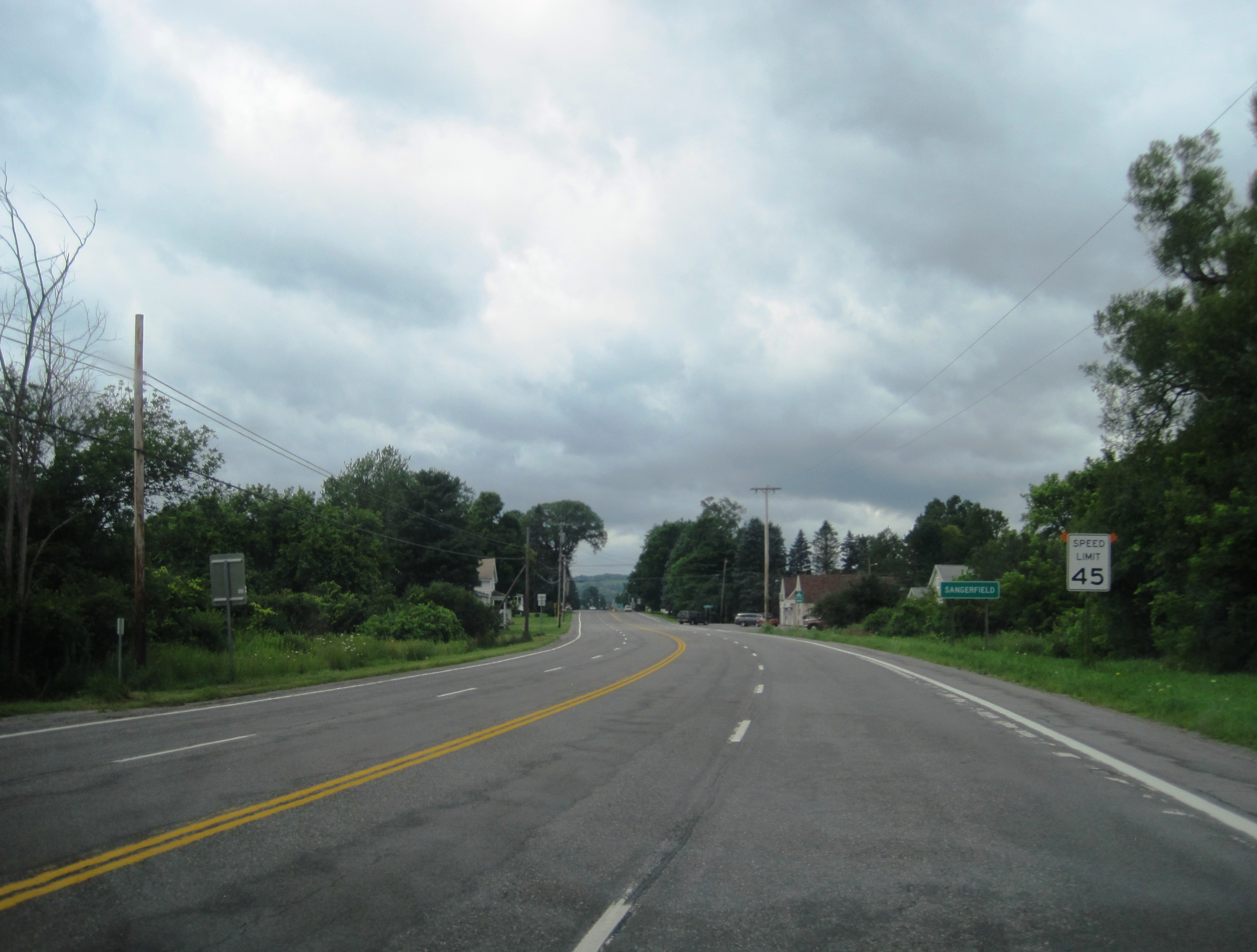
- Entering the hamlet of Sangerfield along US 20 westbound

- Location in Oneida County and the state of New York.
- Coordinates: 42°54′50″N 75°22′51″W
- Country: United States
- State: New York
- County: Oneida

Government
  - Type: Town Council
  - Town Supervisor: William Fredericks (R)
  - Town Council: Members' List: • Louis Langone (D); • Michael Tower (R); • James Wratten (R); • David McNamara (R)

Area
  - Total: 30.98 sq mi (80.24 km^{2})
  - Land: 30.80 sq mi (79.78 km^{2})
  - Water: 0.18 sq mi (0.46 km^{2})
- Elevation: 1,570 ft (480 m)

Population (2010)
  - Total: 2,561
  - Estimate (2016): 2,499
  - Density: 81.1/sq mi (31.32/km^{2})
- Time zone: UTC-5 (Eastern (EST))
  - Summer (DST): UTC-4 (EDT)
- ZIP Codes: 13455 (Sangerfield); 13480 (Waterville); 13425 (Oriskany Falls)
- Area code: 315
- FIPS code: 36-65134
- GNIS feature ID: 0979458
- Website: Town of Sangerfield

Sangerfield is a town in Oneida County, New York, United States. The population was 2,561 at the 2010 census. The town is named after Jedediah Sanger, an early settler.

The Town of Sangerfield is on the county's southern border.

== Geography ==
According to the United States Census Bureau, the town has a total area of 31.0 square miles (80 km^{2}), of which 30.8 square miles (80 km^{2}) is land and 0.2 square miles (0.52 km^{2}) (0.52%) is water.

The southern and western town lines are the border of Madison County. U.S. Route 20 crosses the town. The Sangerfield River is an important stream flowing southward through the town.

== History ==
The town was first settled c. 1792.

In 1788, the State of New York bought from the Oneida Indians twenty towns that bordered the Unadilla River. This land became known as "Clinton's Purchase". In 1789, the state surveyed "Township No. 20" in this tract for

- Michael Myers of Herkimer,
- Jedediah Sanger of New Hartford, and
- John I. Morgan.

This region then went through several name changes in its early years:

From Date	To Date	Town Name	County Name
15 Feb. 1791	10 Apr. 1792	Whitestown	Herkimer
10 Apr. 1792	5 Mar. 1795	Paris	Herkimer
5 Mar. 1795	15 Mar. 1798	Sangerfield	Herkimer
15 Mar. 1798	4 Apr. 1804	Sangerfield	Chenango
4 Apr. 1804	Present	Sangerfield	Oneida

Sangerfield was formed from the Town of Paris in 1795, prior to the creation of Oneida County.

== Demographics ==
Historical population
Census	Pop.	Note	%±
1800	1,143		—
1810	1,324		15.8%
1820	2,011		51.9%
1830	2,272		13.0%
1840	2,251		−0.9%
1850	2,371		5.3%
1860	2,343		−1.2%
1870	2,513		7.3%
1880	3,171		26.2%
1890	3,017		−4.9%
1900	2,440		−19.1%
1910	2,086		−14.5%
1920	1,795		−14.0%
1930	1,862		3.7%
1940	1,961		5.3%
1950	2,143		9.3%
1960	2,482		15.8%
1970	2,475		−0.3%
1980	2,397		−3.2%
1990	2,460		2.6%
2000	2,610		6.1%
2010	2,561		−1.9%
2016 (est.)	2,499		−2.4%
U.S. Decennial Census

As of the census of 2000, there were 2,610 people, 944 households, and 684 families residing in the town. The population density was 84.7/sq mi (32.7/km^{2}). There were 1,010 housing units at an average density of 32.8/sq mi (12.7/km^{2}). The racial makeup of the town was 98.31% White, 0.38% African American, 0.31% Native American, 0.38% Asian, 0.04% Pacific Islander, 0.04% from other races, and 0.54% from two or more races. Hispanic or Latino of any race were 0.54% of the population.

There were 944 households, out of which 38.2% had children under the age of 18 living with them, 55.2% were married couples living together, 13.0% had a female householder with no husband present, and 27.5% were non-families. 22.5% of all households were made up of individuals, and 10.7% had someone living alone who was 65 years of age or older. The average household size was 2.67 and the average family size was 3.09.

In the town, the population was spread out, with 28.2% under the age of 18, 7.0% from 18 to 24, 26.9% from 25 to 44, 21.5% from 45 to 64, and 16.3% who were 65 years of age or older. The median age was 38 years. For every 100 females, there were 91.6 males. For every 100 females age 18 and over, there were 82.7 males.

The median income for a household in the town was $38,264, and the median income for a family was $44,871. Males had a median income of $31,144 versus $21,250 for females. The per capita income for the town was $17,068. About 5.9% of families and 9.7% of the population were below the poverty line, including 10.6% of those under age 18 and 9.2% of those age 65 or over.

== Communities and locations in Sangerfield ==
- Chittning Pond – A small lake near the eastern town line, located just east of the local State Lands.
- Conger Corners – A location between the Sangerfield hamlet and Pleasant Valley at the intersection of U.S. Route 20 with Madison Street on the north, and Newberry Road to the south.
- Five Corners – A hamlet southeast of the Sangerfield hamlet.
- Nine-Mile Swamp (Skanawis) – A swamp on the east branch of the Chenango River (Sangerfield River) that is partly in the southwestern part of the town. Famous for lodging the Loomis Gang.
- Pleasant Valley – A hamlet west of the Sangerfield hamlet on US Route 20.
- Sangerfield – The hamlet of Sangerfield is south of Waterville and on US Route 20. The Sangerfield area is located on a geological divide, with streams to the north draining into the Oriskany Creek and eventually the Mohawk River (Tenonatche), streams to the south draining into the Chenango River and eventually the Susquehanna. Location of the town government.
- Stockwell – A hamlet in the southern part of the town.
- Tassel Hill – Highest point in Oneida County. Located in the northeastern part of the town, east of Route 12 on the borders of Bridgewater, Marshall, and Paris townships.
- Waterville – Part of the Village of Waterville is within the northern town line, north of Sangerfield village on Route 12.
- Whiskey Hollow – A small stretch of road on Route 315 approximately .5 miles inside Waterville.

== Historic Places ==
Pleasant Valley Grange Hall is located on the National Register of Historic Places
