= Deansboro, New York =

- hamlet
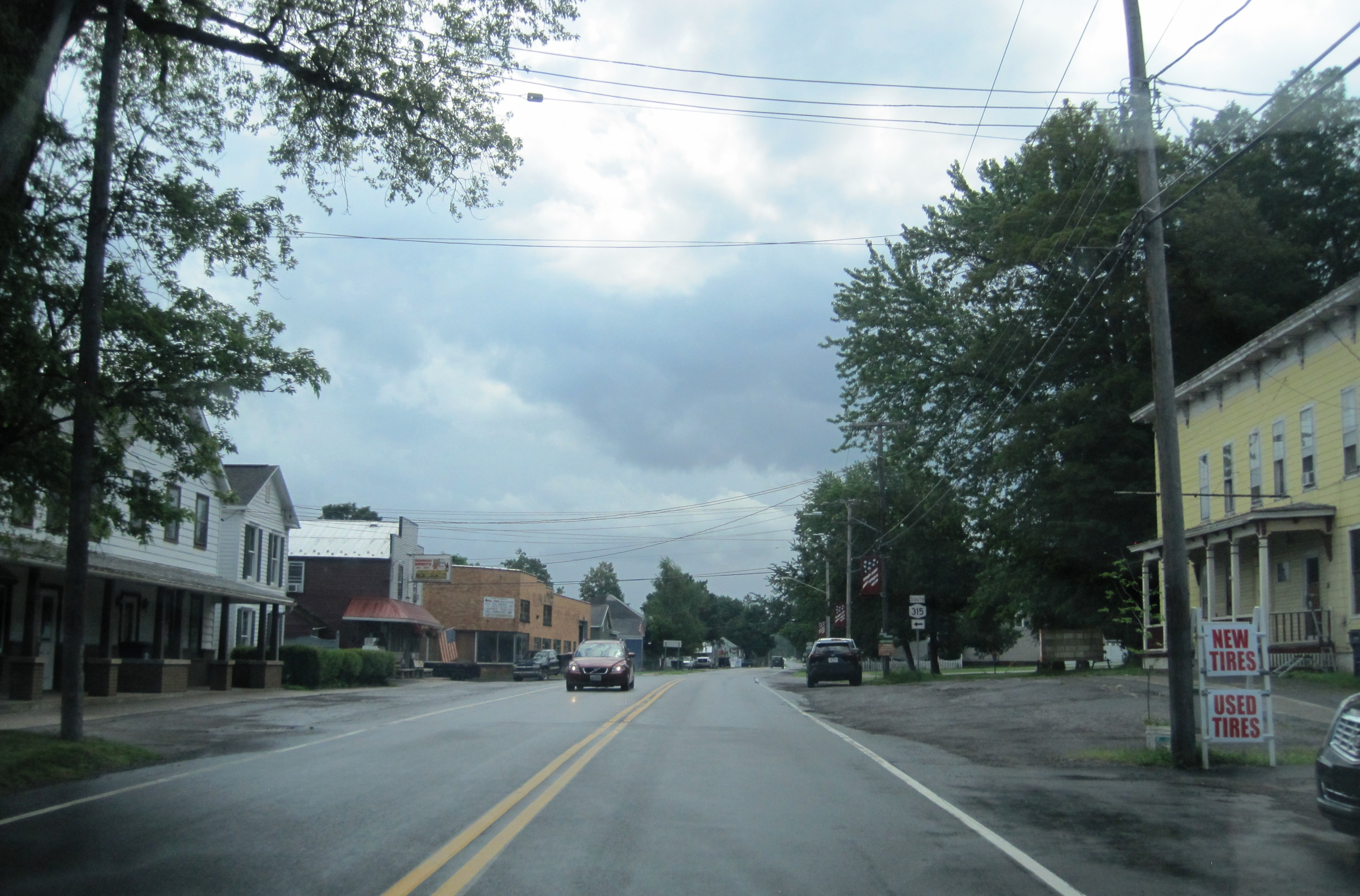
- Intersection of NY 12B and NY 315 in Deansboro

- Location within New York
- Coordinates: 42°59′42″N 75°25′43″W
- Country: United States
- State: New York
- County: Oneida
- Elevation: 817 ft (249 m)
- Time zone: UTC-5 (Eastern (EST))
  - Summer (DST): UTC-4 (EDT)
- ZIP code: 13328
- Area code: 315
- GNIS feature ID: 948145

Deansboro is a hamlet in Oneida County, New York, United States.

The Deansboro Railroad Station was listed on the National Register of Historic Places in 2002.
