= Clarence L. Fisher =

American businessman and politician

Clarence Lyon Fisher (August 22, 1877 – April 14, 1959) was an American businessman and politician from New York.

== Life ==
Fisher was born on August 22, 1877, in Lyonsdale, New York, the son of patent lawyer William Hubbell Fisher and Mary Lyon. His grandfathers were Rev. Samuel W. Fisher, president of Hamilton College, and land owner Lyman R. Lyon.

After attending public school in Lyons Falls, Fisher attended Holbrook's Military Academy at Ossining. He then went to Hamilton College, graduating from there with a Ph.B. in 1900. After graduating, he spent two years working as a reporter for the Philadelphia Press, retiring from the profession for health reasons. He then worked with his mother in the management of the family's timber interests in Lewis and Herkimer counties. He later became half owner and manager of the Fisher Forestry and Realty Company of Lyons Falls. He was also a director of the Black River National Bank of Lowville and vice-president of the Lyons Falls National Bank. During World War I, he was one of the Four Minute Men and enlisted in the army YMCA, where he was put in charge of all YMCA work at the Aberdeen Proving Ground.

In 1910 and 1911, Fisher was elected village president of Lyons Falls. In 1924, he was elected to the New York State Assembly as a Republican, representing Lewis County. He served in the Assembly in 1925, 1926, 1927, 1928, and 1929. While in the Assembly, he authored the Fisher Reforestation Tax Law, got Whetstone Gulf designated and developed into a State park, and secured passage of a Constitutional amendment that eliminated all legal doubt regarding a $100,000 Emergency Fund for the suppression of forest fires. He also served on the Herkimer Home Commission and the New York State Reforestation Commission.

Fisher attended the Forest Presbyterian Church in Lyons Falls. He was master of his Freemason lodge and Deputy Grand Master of the Jefferson-Lewis Masonic district. He was a member of Alpha Delta Phi, the Royal Arch Masonry, the Odd Fellows, the Port Leyden Grange, the Lewis County Pomona Grange, and the Lewis County Farm Bureau. He was a vice-president of the Adirondack Civic League, a director of the Empire State Forest Products Association, president of the New York State Forestry Association and the Lewis County Forestry Council, and a member of the board of governors of the Adirondack Mountain Club. He was also a member of the Sons of the American Revolution. In 1918, he wrote the History of Lyons Falls. In 1907, he married Melissa Rachel Ingals of Chicago, Illinois. Their children were Clarence Ingals and Helena Rachel.

Fisher died at the Syracuse Memorial Hospital on April 14, 1959. He was buried in Wildwood Cemetery in Lyons Falls.

New York State Assembly
Preceded by Miller B. Moran	New York State Assembly; Lewis County; 1925–1929	Succeeded by Edward M. Sheldon
