= Lansing Kill =

River in New York State, U.S.

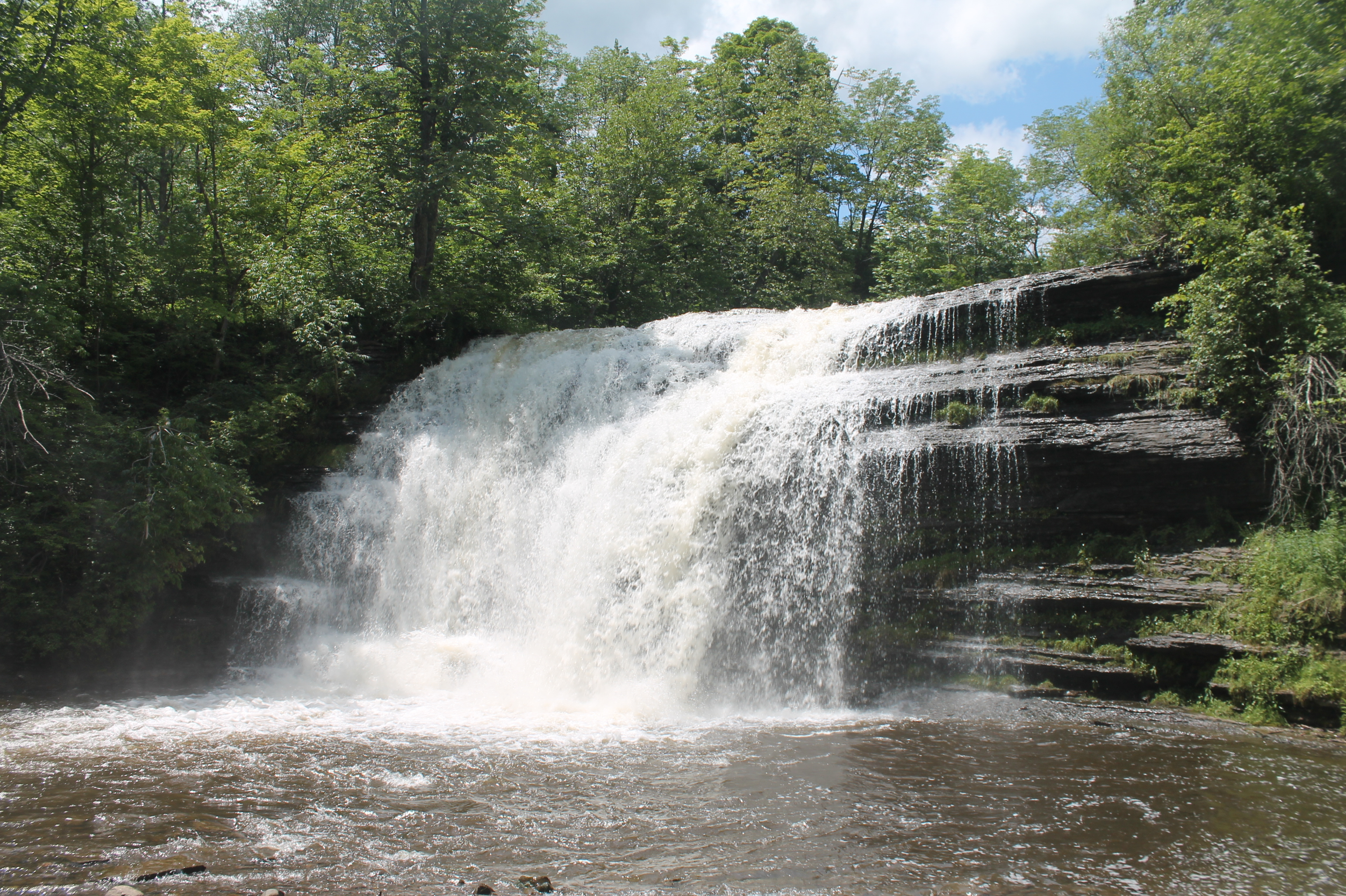
- Pixley Falls in June 2013

- Location of the mouth within New York Lansing Kill (the United States)

Location
- Country: United States
- State: New York
- Region: Central New York
- County: Oneida

Physical characteristics
- Source
  - location: West of Alder Creek
  - coordinates: 43°24′47″N 75°18′28″W
  - elevation: Approximately 1,420 ft (430 m)
- Mouth: Mohawk River
  - location: North of Westernville
  - coordinates: 43°21′03″N 75°22′30″W
  - elevation: 623 ft (190 m)
- Basin size: 31.3 sq mi (81 km^{2})

Basin features
- Tributaries
  - right: Clark Brook, Dunn Brook, Chase Creek
- Waterfalls: Pixley Falls

Lansing Kill is a river in Oneida County in the state of New York. The river begins west of Alder Creek and flows into the Mohawk River approximately five miles (8.0 km) north of Westernville. Pixley Falls is a waterfall located on Lansing Kill by Hurlbutville. Lansing Kill flows through Pixley Falls State Park and it flows parallel to the old Black River Canal for much of its course.
