= Lyonsdale, New York =

- Town
- Location within New York Location within the United States
- Coordinates: 43°36′8″N 75°18′5″W
- Country: United States
- State: New York
- County: Lewis

Area
  - Total: 70.10 sq mi (181.57 km^{2})
  - Land: 68.74 sq mi (178.04 km^{2})
  - Water: 1.36 sq mi (3.53 km^{2})
- Elevation: 1,220 ft (372 m)

Population (2010)
  - Total: 1,227
  - Estimate (2016): 1,216
  - Density: 17.7/sq mi (6.83/km^{2})
- Time zone: UTC-5 (Eastern (EST))
  - Summer (DST): UTC-4 (EDT)
- ZIP Codes: 13433 (Port Leyden); 13368 (Lyons Falls); 13309 (Boonville); 13312 (Brantingham)
- Area code: 315
- FIPS code: 36-049-43995
- GNIS feature ID: 979176
- Website: https://lyonsdaleny.gov/

Lyonsdale is a town in Lewis County, New York, United States. The population was 1,227 at the 2010 census. The town is named after its principal community and its founder Caleb Lyon.

Lyonsdale is in the southeastern part of the county and is just north of Boonville.

== History ==
The community of Lyonsdale was settled in 1819. Caleb Lyons, the town founder, was an advocate of the Black River Canal. The town was formed from the town of Greig in 1873. The traditional economy has been based on forest products, such as wood pulp.

== Geography ==
According to the United States Census Bureau, the town has a total area of 70.1 square miles (182 km^{2}), of which 68.7 square miles (178 km^{2}) are land and 1.4 square miles (3.6 km^{2}), or 2.00%, are water.

The western town line is the Black River and the town of Leyden. The eastern town line is the border of the town of Webb in Herkimer County, the southern town line is the border of the town of Boonville in Oneida County, and the northern town line is the border of the town of Greig.

Part of the town is in the Adirondack Park. The Moose River, a tributary of the Black River, flows through the town.

== Demographics ==
Historical population
Census	Pop.	Note	%±
1880	1,475		—
1890	1,451		−1.6%
1900	1,371		−5.5%
1910	1,007		−26.5%
1920	918		−8.8%
1930	762		−17.0%
1940	909		19.3%
1950	873		−4.0%
1960	942		7.9%
1970	1,013		7.5%
1980	1,135		12.0%
1990	1,281		12.9%
2000	1,273		−0.6%
2010	1,227		−3.6%
2016 (est.)	1,216		−0.9%
U.S. Decennial Census

As of the census of 2000, there were 1,273 people, 468 households, and 336 families residing in the town. The population density was 18.5 inhabitants per square mile (7.1/km^{2}). There were 703 housing units at an average density of 10.2 per square mile (3.9/km^{2}). The racial makeup of the town was 98.19% White, 0.86% African American, 0.16% Native American, 0.31% from other races, and 0.47% from two or more races. Hispanic or Latino of any race were 0.39% of the population.

There were 468 households, out of which 36.1% had children under the age of 18 living with them, 54.5% were married couples living together, 9.0% had a female householder with no husband present, and 28.0% were non-families. 22.4% of all households were made up of individuals, and 13.0% had someone living alone who was 65 years of age or older. The average household size was 2.72 and the average family size was 3.11.

In the town, the population was spread out, with 28.4% under the age of 18, 10.3% from 18 to 24, 27.0% from 25 to 44, 21.3% from 45 to 64, and 13.0% who were 65 years of age or older. The median age was 35 years. For every 100 females, there were 104.7 males. For every 100 females age 18 and over, there were 102.9 males.

The median income for a household in the town was $33,321, and the median income for a family was $35,938. Males had a median income of $30,357 versus $17,917 for females. The per capita income for the town was $13,298. About 13.8% of families and 20.0% of the population were below the poverty line, including 26.9% of those under age 18 and 21.3% of those age 65 or over.

== Communities and locations in the Lyonsdale ==
- Fowlerville – A location on the Moose River east of the hamlet of Lyonsdale; it is inside the Adirondack Park on the Moose River.
- Goulds Mill – A location southwest of the hamlet of Lyonsdale.
- Kosterville – A location west of the hamlet of Lyonsdale.
- Lyonsdale – The hamlet of Lyonsdale is east of the village of Lyons Falls and on the bank of the Moose River.
- Lyons Falls – Part of the village of Lyons Falls, east of the Black River, is within the town of Lyonsdale.
- Moose River Village – Solely within the Adirondack Park, this former hamlet is located on the Moose River Road, in the southeastern portion of the town next to the Moose River.
- Mud Shanty Corners – A location where the Moose River Road, the North South Road, and the Wildcat Road intersect; east of the village of Port Leyden.
- Port Leyden – Part of the village of Port Leyden, east of the Black River, is within the town of Lyonsdale.
- Porters Corners – A location where the Moose River and Boonville Roads intersect, near the town's southern boundary.
- Pennysettlement – A location northeast of the village of Port Leyden, inside the Adirondack Park.
- Shuetown – A location west of the hamlet of Lyonsdale on the north side of the Moose River.
