= West Leyden, New York =

- Hamlet
- Location within New York Location within the United States
- Coordinates: 43°27′34″N 75°27′50″W
- Country: United States
- State: New York
- County: Lewis
- Town: Lewis
- Elevation: 1,489 ft (454 m)
- Time zone: UTC-5 (Eastern (EST))
  - Summer (DST): UTC-4 (EDT)
- ZIP code: 13489
- Area codes: 315 & 680
- GNIS feature ID: 970784

West Leyden is a hamlet in Lewis County, New York, United States. The community is located in the town of Lewis along the East Branch of the Mohawk River at the intersection of New York State Route 26 and New York State Route 294, 6.6 miles (10.6 km) west-southwest of Boonville. West Leyden has a post office with ZIP code 13489, which opened on December 16, 1826. Today West Leyden is home to approximately 250 residents, a grocery store/gas station, church, two restaurants, garbage company, Volunteer Fire and Ambulance Department and Elementary School.
