= New York State Route 12D =

State highway in northern New York, US

New York State Route 12D
- NY 12D highlighted in red and NY 970J in blue

Route information
- Auxiliary route of NY 12
- Maintained by NYSDOT
- Length: 11.50 mi (18.51 km)
- Existed: 1930–present

Major junctions
- South end: NY 12 in Boonville
- NY 26 at Potters Corners
- North end: NY 12 in Lyons Falls

Location
- Country: United States
- State: New York
- Counties: Oneida, Lewis

Highway system
- New York Highways; Interstate; US; State; Reference; Parkways
← NY 12C	→ NY 12E

New York State Route 12D (NY 12D) is a north–south state highway located in the northern part of New York in the United States. The southern terminus of the route is in the Oneida County village of Boonville, where it intersects NY 12. The northern terminus is at a junction with NY 12 in the Lewis County village of Lyons Falls. NY 46 and NY 294 are also present in the immediate area of the route's southern terminus.

NY 12D was originally assigned as part of the 1930 renumbering of state highways in New York to most of what is now NY 12 between Boonville and Lowville. The alignments of both routes between the two locations were swapped c. 1939, placing NY 12D on its current alignment from Boonville to Potters Corners (in the Town of West Turin) and on NY 26 between Potters Corners and Lowville. The overlap between NY 12D and NY 26 remained in place until the 1970s when NY 12D was realigned onto its current routing between Potters Corners and Lyons Falls, replacing then-New York State Route 337.

== Route description ==
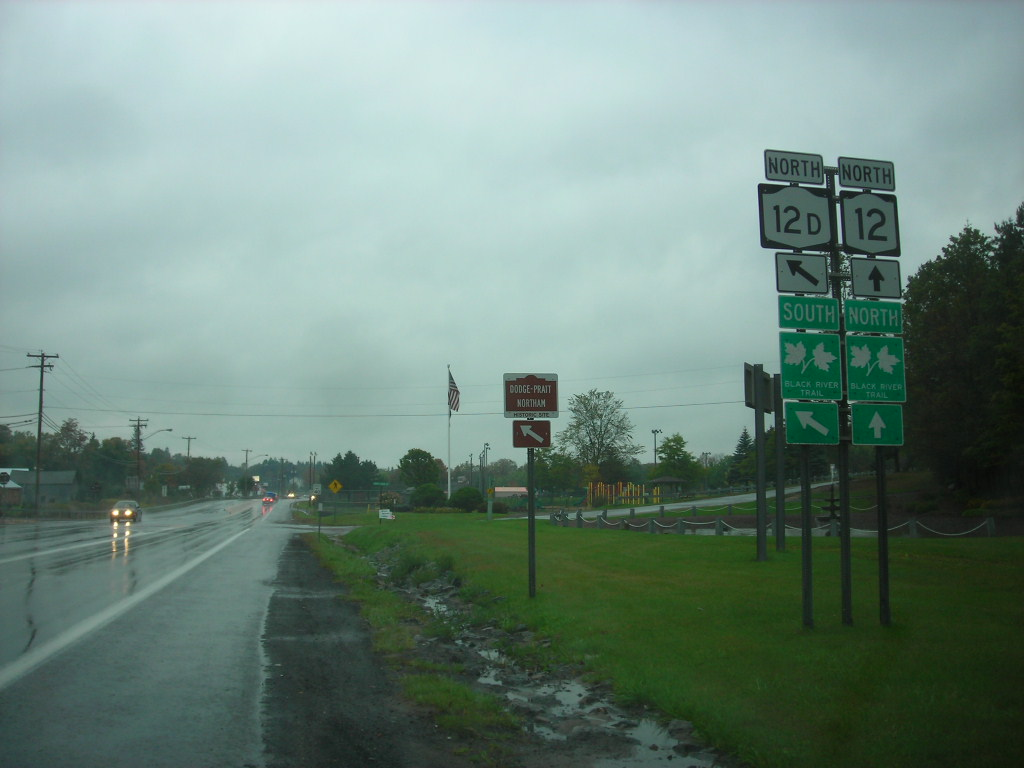
Southern terminus of NY 12D at NY 12 in Lowville

NY 12D begins at an intersection with NY 12 at the southeastern edge of the village of Boonville in northern Oneida County. While NY 12 bypasses the village to the east, NY 12D heads northwest into the village on Main Street. At Schuyler Street, NY 12D bears west for one block to Post Street, where it intersects the northern terminus of NY 46. The eastern terminus of NY 294 is located one block to the south at the junction of Post and Ford streets. NY 12D, meanwhile, turns north at Post Street and follows the street out of the village and through the town of Boonville to the Lewis County town of Leyden.

Within Leyden, NY 12D passes through largely rural terrain with the exception of a pair of roadside communities: the hamlet of Talcottville on the Sugar River, a tributary of the nearby Black River, and the community of Locust Grove at the intersection of NY 12D and Locust Grove Road. The route crosses into West Turin roughly 1 mile (1.6 km) later, where it intersects NY 26 at Potters Corners. NY 26 turns north here to follow the right-of-way of NY 12D; however, NY 12D turns northeast onto the right-of-way of NY 26 toward Lyons Falls. Near the western edge of the village, NY 12D passes over NY 12 with no access between the two. The connection is made a short distance to the southeast via McAlpine and Cherry Streets, which NY 12D follows to terminate at NY 12.

== History ==
In 1908, the New York State Legislature created Route 27, an unsigned legislative route that initially extended from Forestport to Alexandria Bay via Boonville, Lowville, and Watertown. From Boonville to Lowville, Route 27 used what is now NY 12D and NY 26. When the first set of posted routes in New York were assigned in 1924, the segment of legislative Route 27 between Boonville and Lowville via Potters Corners was designated as part of NY 12. An alternate route of NY 12 between Potters Corners and Lowville via Lyons Falls was assigned NY 12D as part of the 1930 renumbering of state highways in New York. By the following year, NY 12D was rerouted south of Lyons Falls to follow a routing similar to modern NY 12 to Boonville. The former routing of NY 12D between Potters Corners and Lyons Falls was redesignated as NY 337 c. 1935. The routings of NY 12 and NY 12D between Boonville and Lowville were swapped c. 1939.

Originally, NY 12 entered Lyons Falls on Franklin Street and followed Center and McAlpine Streets through the village before leaving the area on Cherry Street. NY 12 was rerouted onto its current alignment around the western edge of Lyons Falls in the late 1940s; however, NY 337 was not truncated nor rerouted to meet the new path of NY 12. Instead, NY 337 was initially extended eastward along the former alignment of NY 12 on McAlpine Street to a new terminus at Center Street. It was rerouted east of Cherry Street to follow Cherry south to NY 12 c. 1970. The former routing of NY 337 along McAlpine Street from Cherry Street to a grade crossing with the Mohawk, Adirondack and Northern Railroad, a distance of 0.03 miles (48 m), is now designated as NY 970J, an unsigned reference route. The overlap between NY 12D and NY 26 north of Potters Corners was eliminated c. 1972 when NY 12D was rerouted to follow NY 337 to Lyons Falls, placing NY 12D on its current alignment.

== Major intersections ==
County	Location	mi	km	Destinations	Notes
Oneida	Village of Boonville	0.00	0.00	NY 12 – Port Leyden, Alder Creek	Southern terminus
Oneida	Village of Boonville	0.62	1.00	NY 46 south (Post Street) to NY 294 west – Rome, Pixley Falls State Park	Northern terminus of NY 46
Lewis	West Turin	9.24	14.87	NY 26 – Lowville, Watertown, Rome	Hamlet of Potters Corners
Lewis	Lyons Falls	11.26	18.12	McAlpine Street ( NY 970J)	Former NY 337
Lewis	Lyons Falls	11.50	18.51	NY 12 (Black River Trail) – Boonville, Lowville	Northern terminus
1.000 mi = 1.609 km; 1.000 km = 0.621 mi
