= Mary Whitney =

Mary Whitney may refer to:

- Mary Traffarn Whitney (1852–1942), American minister editor, social reformer, philanthropist, lecturer
- Mary Watson Whitney (1847–1921), American astronomer
