= Lewis, New York =

Lewis is the name of several places in the U.S. state of New York:

- Lewis, Essex County, New York
- Lewis, Lewis County, New York
- Lewis County, New York
