= Boonville Historic District =

Historic district in New York, United States

- U.S. National Register of Historic Places
- U.S. Historic district
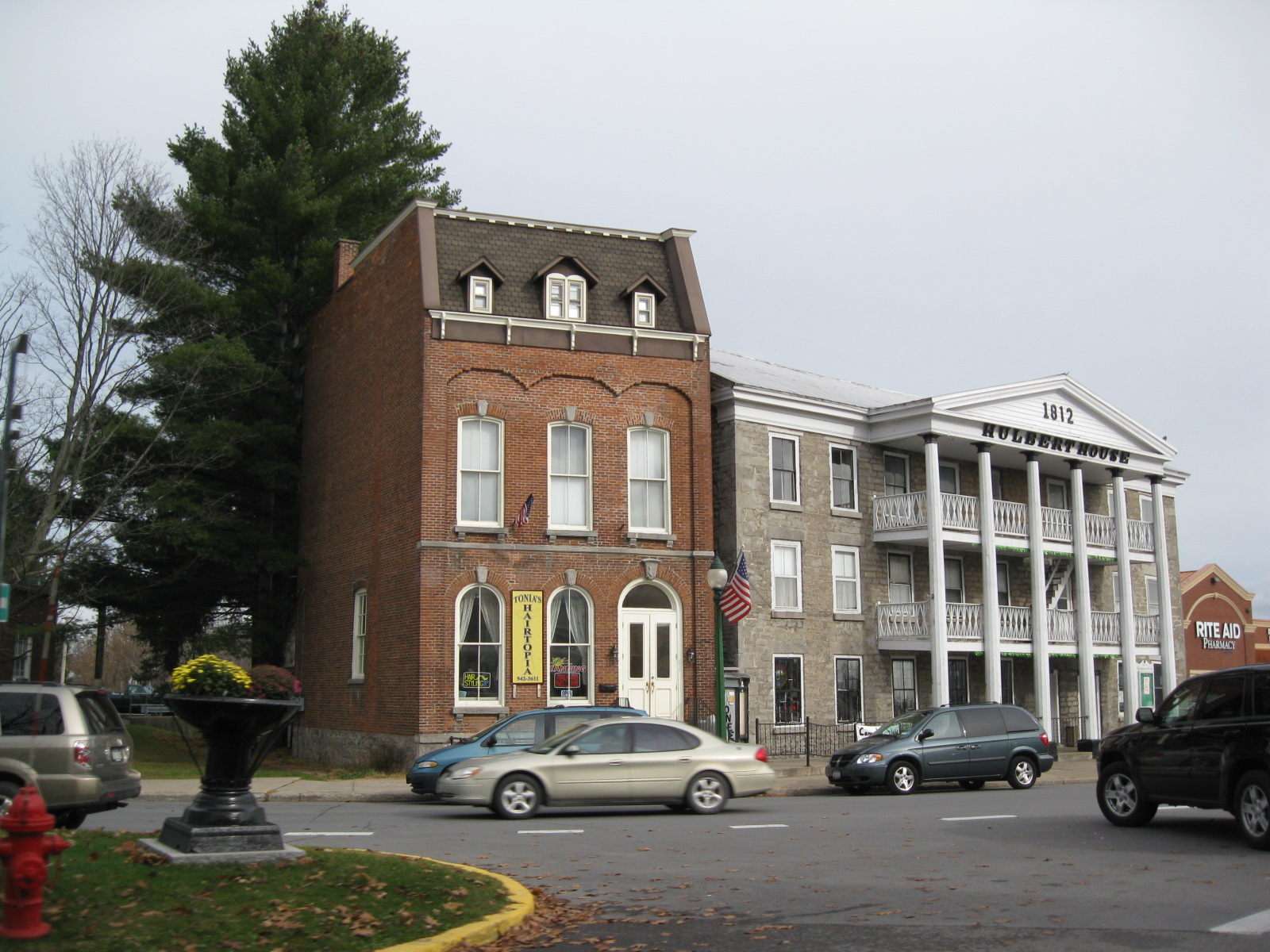
- 103 & 105 Main St., November 2009

- Location within New York Location within the United States
- Location: Schuyler, Post, W. Main and Summit Sts., Boonville, New York
- Coordinates: 43°29′4″N 75°20′13″W
- Area: 26 acres (11 ha)
- Built: 1848
- Architect: Lathrop, Azel J.; Et al.
- NRHP reference No.: 79001608
- Added to NRHP: November 16, 1979

Boonville Village Historic District is a national historic district located at Boonville in Oneida County, New York. The district includes 74 contributing buildings, two contributing structures, and two contributing sites. It includes a grouping of architecturally significant buildings that front on the triangular intersection created by Main, Post, and East Schuyler streets. Located within the district are the separately listed Erwin Library and Pratt House and US Post Office-Boonville.

It was listed on the National Register of Historic Places in 1979.
