= Five Lock Combine and Locks 37 and 38, Black River Canal =

- U.S. National Register of Historic Places
- U.S. Historic district
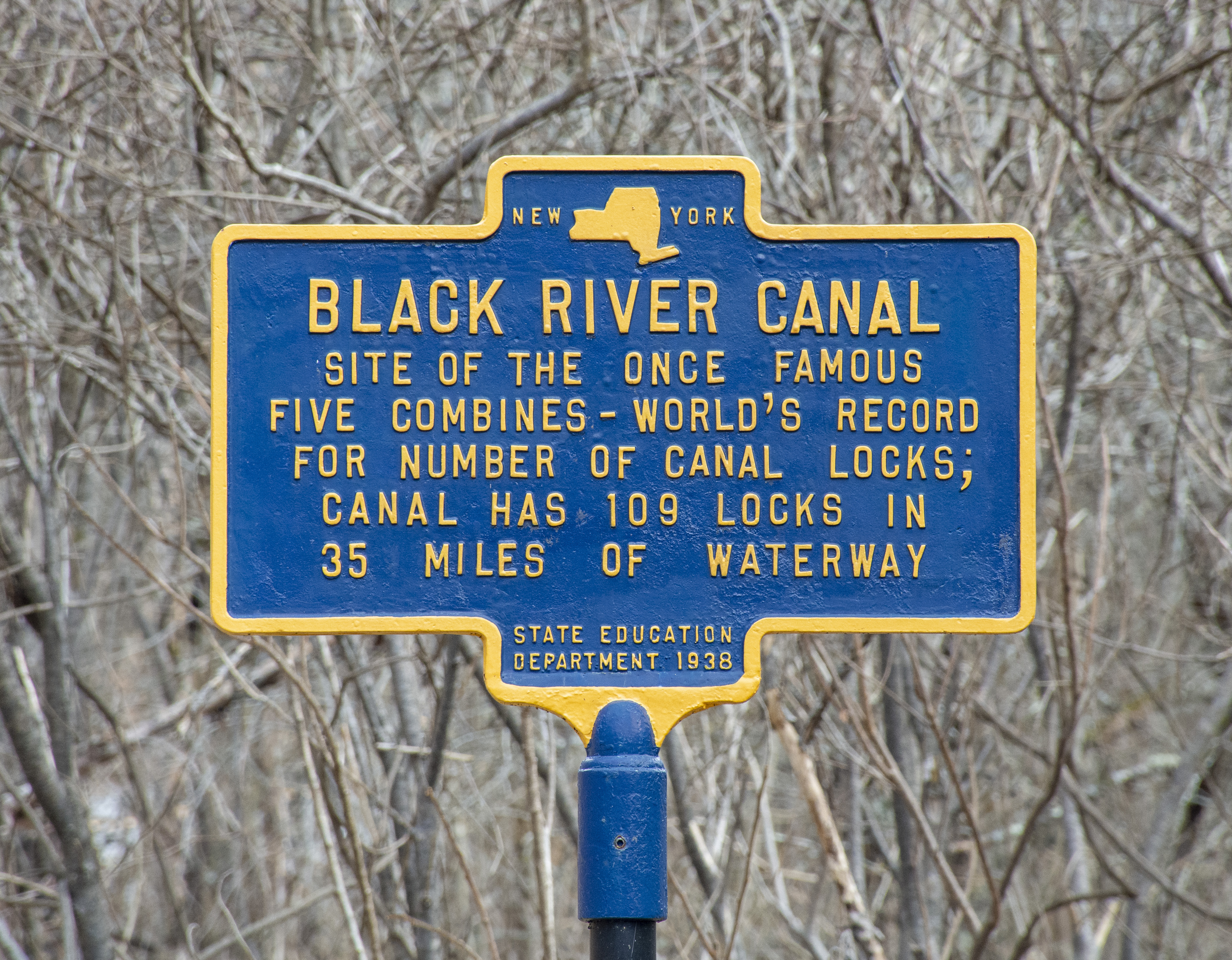

- Location within New York Location within the United States
- Location: NY 46, Boonville, New York
- Coordinates: 43°24′11″N 75°21′49″W
- Area: 71.6 acres (29.0 ha)
- Built: 1850
- Architect: Root, Partous
- NRHP reference No.: 73001229
- Added to NRHP: March 20, 1973

Five Lock Combine and Locks 37 and 38, Black River Canal is a national historic district located in the Boonville Gorge Park at Boonville in Oneida County, New York. The district includes seven locks of the abandoned Black River Canal, including the five lock combine (locks 39 through 43). The locks are 90 by 15 feet (27.4 by 4.6 m) and could accommodate boats of 70 tons. The original locks were built about 1850 and rebuilt between 1887 and 1900. The canal closed in 1924.

It was listed on the National Register of Historic Places in 1973.
