= United States Post Office (Boonville, New York) =

- US Post Office-Boonville
- U.S. National Register of Historic Places
- U.S. Historic district – Contributing property
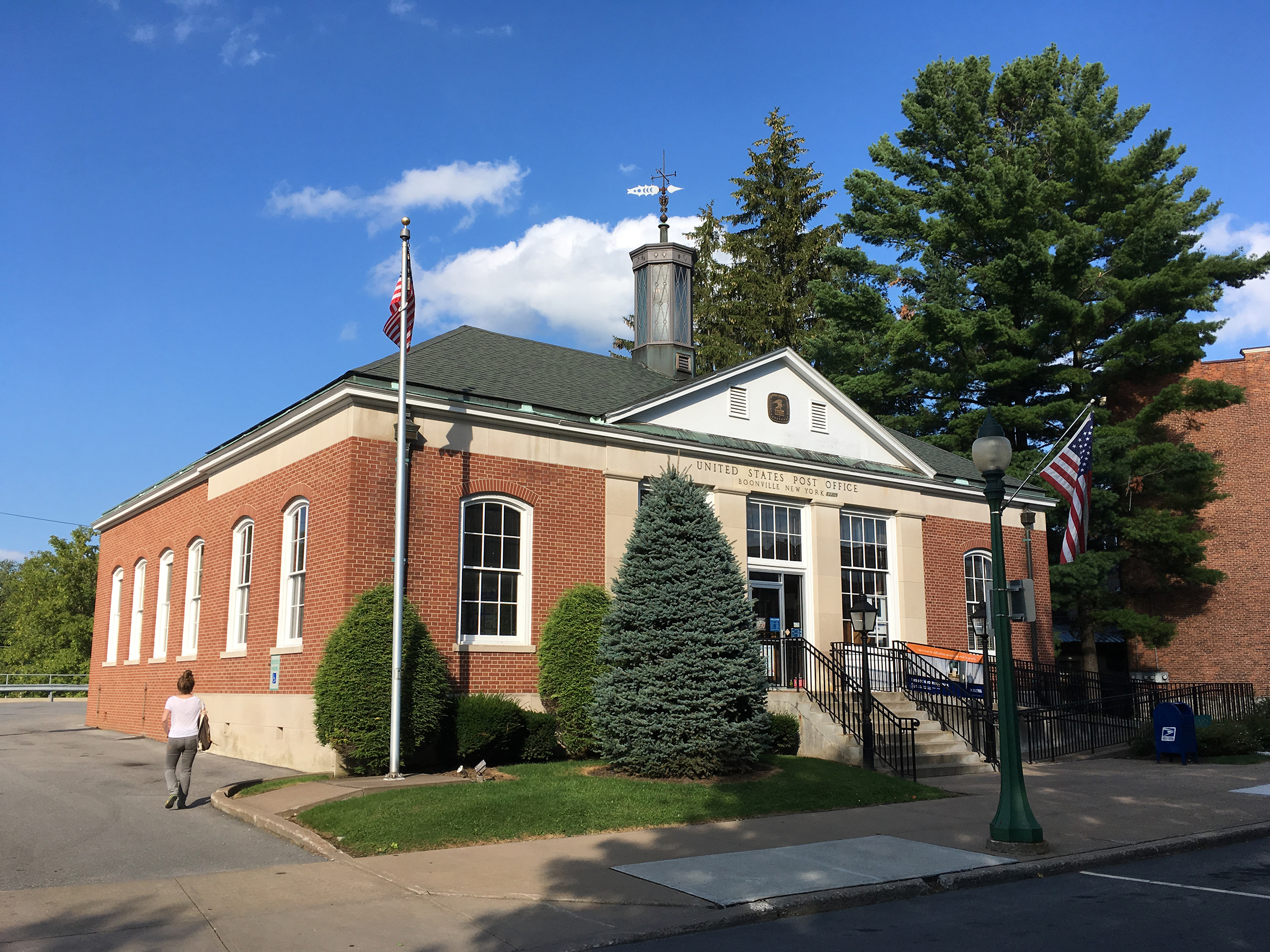
- Boonville Post Office

- Location within New York Location within the United States
- Location: 101 Main St., Boonville, New York
- Coordinates: 43°29′3″N 75°20′9″W
- Area: less than one acre
- Built: 1937
- Architect: US Treasury Dept.; Simon, Louis A.
- Architectural style: Colonial Revival
- MPS: US Post Offices in New York State, 1858-1943, TR
- NRHP reference No.: 88002457
- Added to NRHP: November 17, 1988

US Post Office-Boonville is a historic post office building located at Boonville in Oneida County, New York, United States. It was designed and built in 1937, and is one of a number of post offices in New York State designed by the Office of the Supervising Architect of the Treasury Department, Louis A. Simon. It is a one-story, five bay building with a poured concrete foundation and brick facades in the Colonial Revival style. It features a hipped roof surmounted by an octagonal cupola with metal window tracery and an iron weathervane. The interior features a mural painted by the McCullough sisters of New York City depicting a 19th-century scene on the Black River Canal. It is a contributing structure within the Boonville Historic District.

It was listed on the National Register of Historic Places in 1988.
