= Pixley Falls =

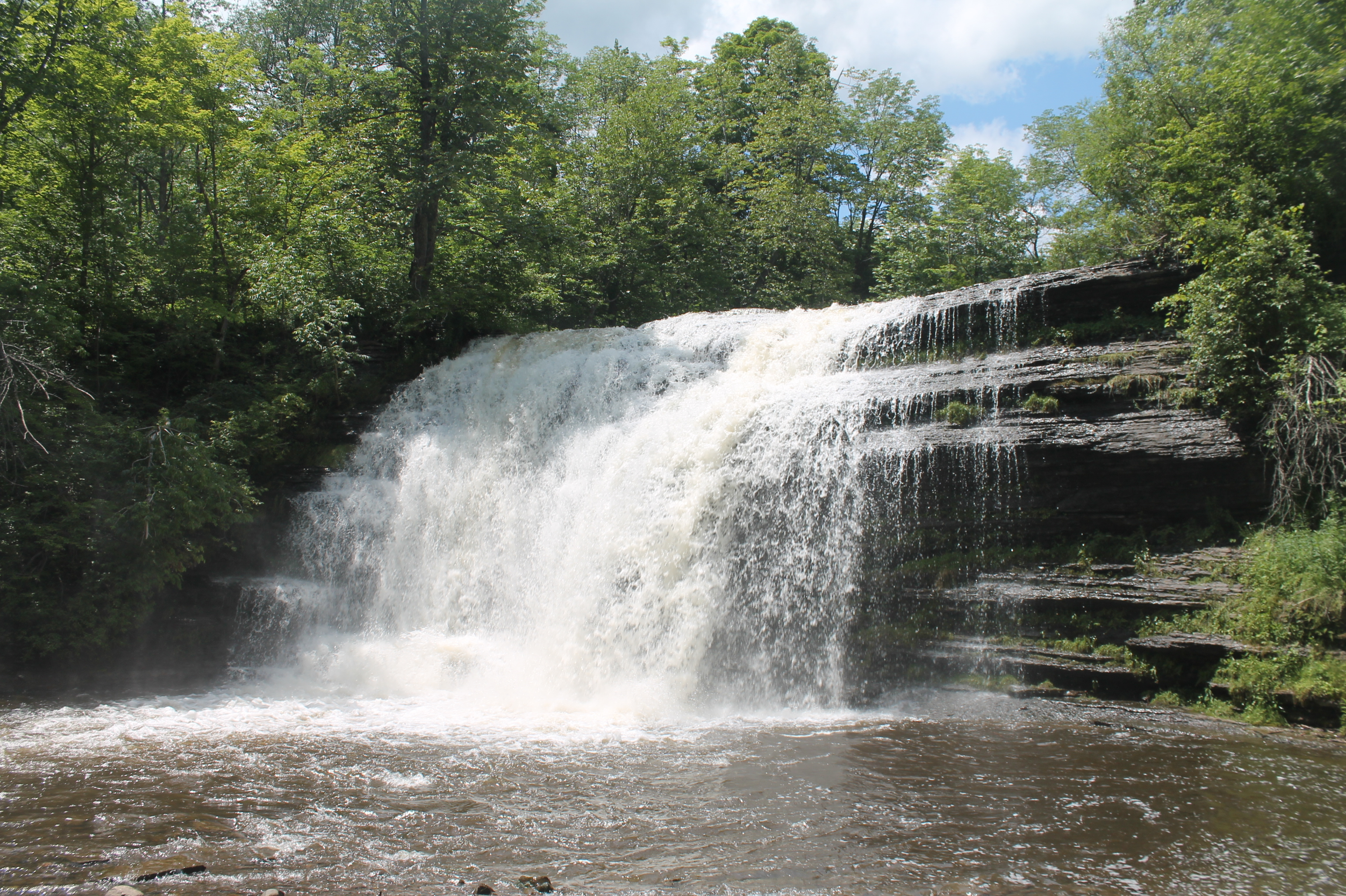
- Pixley Falls in June 2013.

- Location within New York
- Coordinates: 43°24′08″N 75°20′39″W
- Elevation: 840 ft (260 m)
- Watercourse: Lansing Kill

Pixley Falls is a waterfall located on Lansing Kill south of Boonville, New York by Hurlbutville, New York. Pixley Falls is located within Pixley Falls State Park.

== See also ==
- List of waterfalls
