= Pixley Falls State Park =

State park in New York, United States

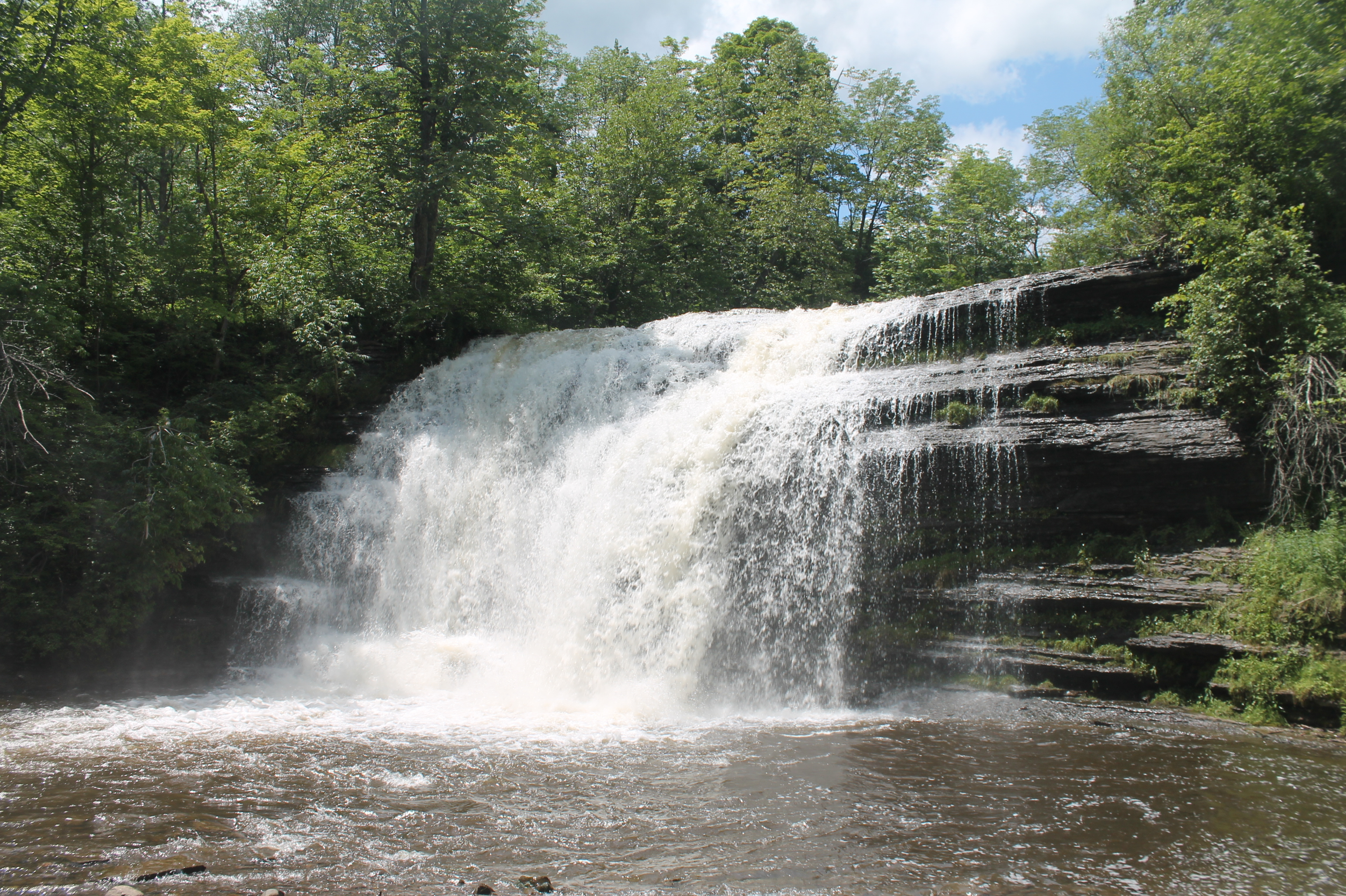
- Pixley Falls in June 2013.

- Location within New York
- Type: State park
- Location: 11430 State Route 46; Boonville, New York
- Nearest city: Rome, New York
- Coordinates: 43°24′12″N 75°20′42″W
- Area: 375 acres (1.52 km^{2})
- Created: 1924
- Operator: New York State Office of Parks, Recreation and Historic Preservation
- Open: All year
- Website: Pixley Falls State Park

Pixley Falls State Park is a 375-acre (1.52 km^{2}) New York state park in the town of Boonville in Oneida County, New York, United States. It is on New York State Route 46, 18 miles (29 km) north of Rome and six miles (9.7 km) southwest of Boonville, near the community of Hurlbutville.

== Facilities ==
Open all year, the park gets its name from Pixley Falls, a 50-foot (15 m) waterfall accessible via a short hiking trail. It offers picnicking, a nature trail, hiking, fishing, seasonal hunting, and cross country skiing. It has steep wooded hills, a mountain trout stream, and a trail that runs along the ruins of the 19th-century Black River Canal.

Camping, once permitted at the park, has not been allowed since it became day-use only in 2010.

== See also ==
- List of New York state parks
- List of waterfalls
