= Black River Canal Warehouse =

Historic commercial building in New York, United States

- U.S. National Register of Historic Places
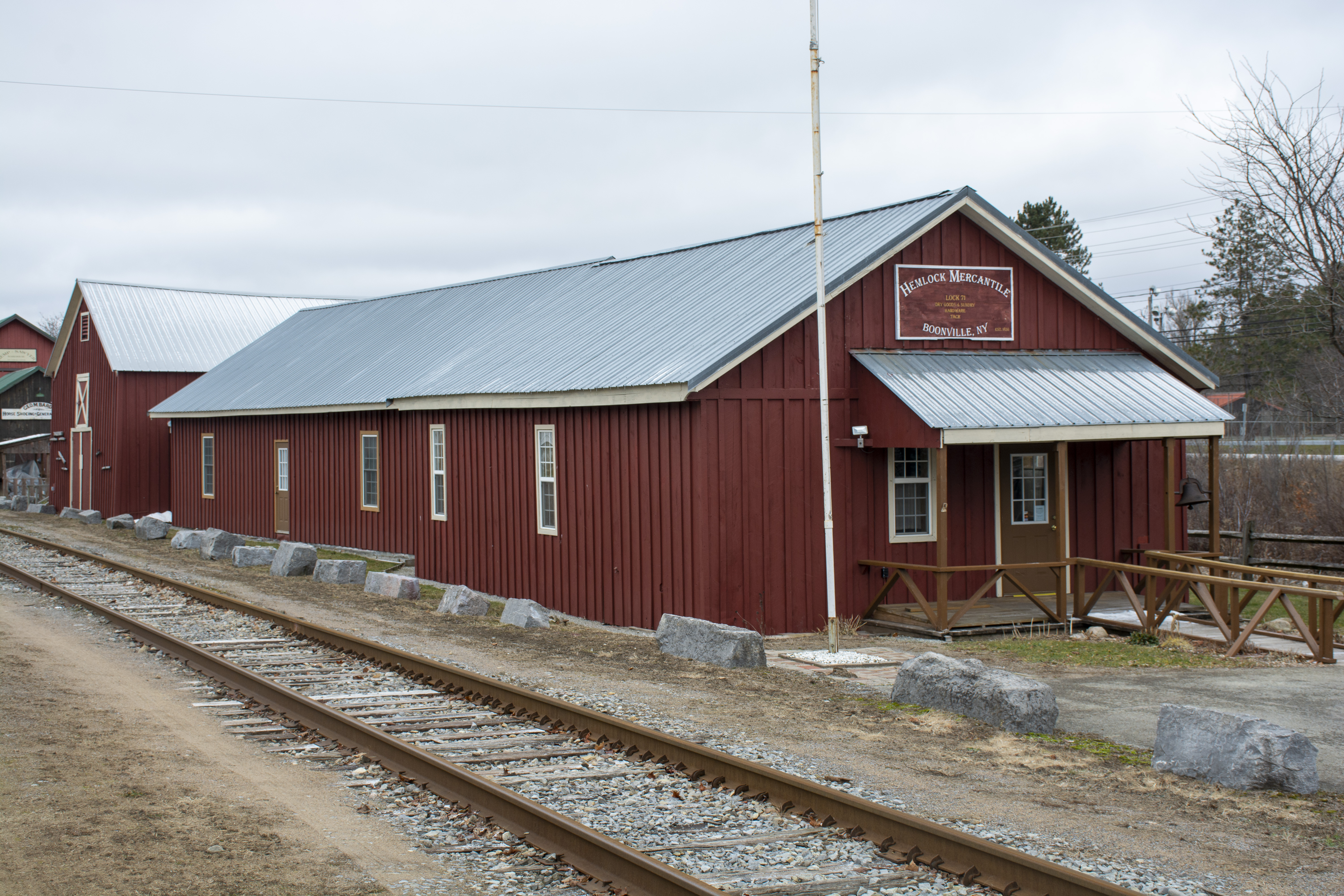

- Location within New York Location within the United States
- Location: 502 Water St. Boonville, New York
- Coordinates: 43°28′52″N 75°19′40″W
- Area: 0.1 acres (0.040 ha)
- Built: 1850
- NRHP reference No.: 03000093
- Added to NRHP: March 7, 2003

Black River Canal Warehouse is a historic canal warehouse building located at Boonville in Oneida County, New York. It was built in 1850 and is a 1 1/2-story, rectangular, wood-frame building, 28 feet by 40 feet with a gable roof. It was built as a warehouse on the Black River Canal and used as such until the canal was abandoned in 1924.

It was listed on the National Register of Historic Places in 2003.

The building is now home to a hands-on exhibit center for the Boonville Black River Canal Museum.
