= The Pines (Lyons Falls, New York) =

Historic house in New York, United States

- U.S. National Register of Historic Places
- Location within New York Location within the United States
- Nearest city: Lyons Falls, New York
- Coordinates: 43°37′23″N 75°21′32″W
- Area: 8.8 acres (3.6 ha)
- Built: 1860
- Architectural style: Italianate
- NRHP reference No.: 07000621
- Added to NRHP: June 27, 2007

"The Pines" is a historic home and related dependencies located at Lyons Falls in Lewis County, New York. The main house was built about 1860 and is a timber-frame, flat-roofed, vernacular Italianate style residence. It consists of a two-story, five-bay main block with 2 two-story wings. Also on the property are a maple sap boiling house / woodshed (c. 1930); carriage house / garage (c. 1880); main barn (c. 1890); woodshed (ca. 1890); and workshop / shed (c. 1910).

It was listed on the National Register of Historic Places in 2007.
