= Gould Mansion Complex =

Historic house in New York, United States

- U.S. National Register of Historic Places
- U.S. Historic district
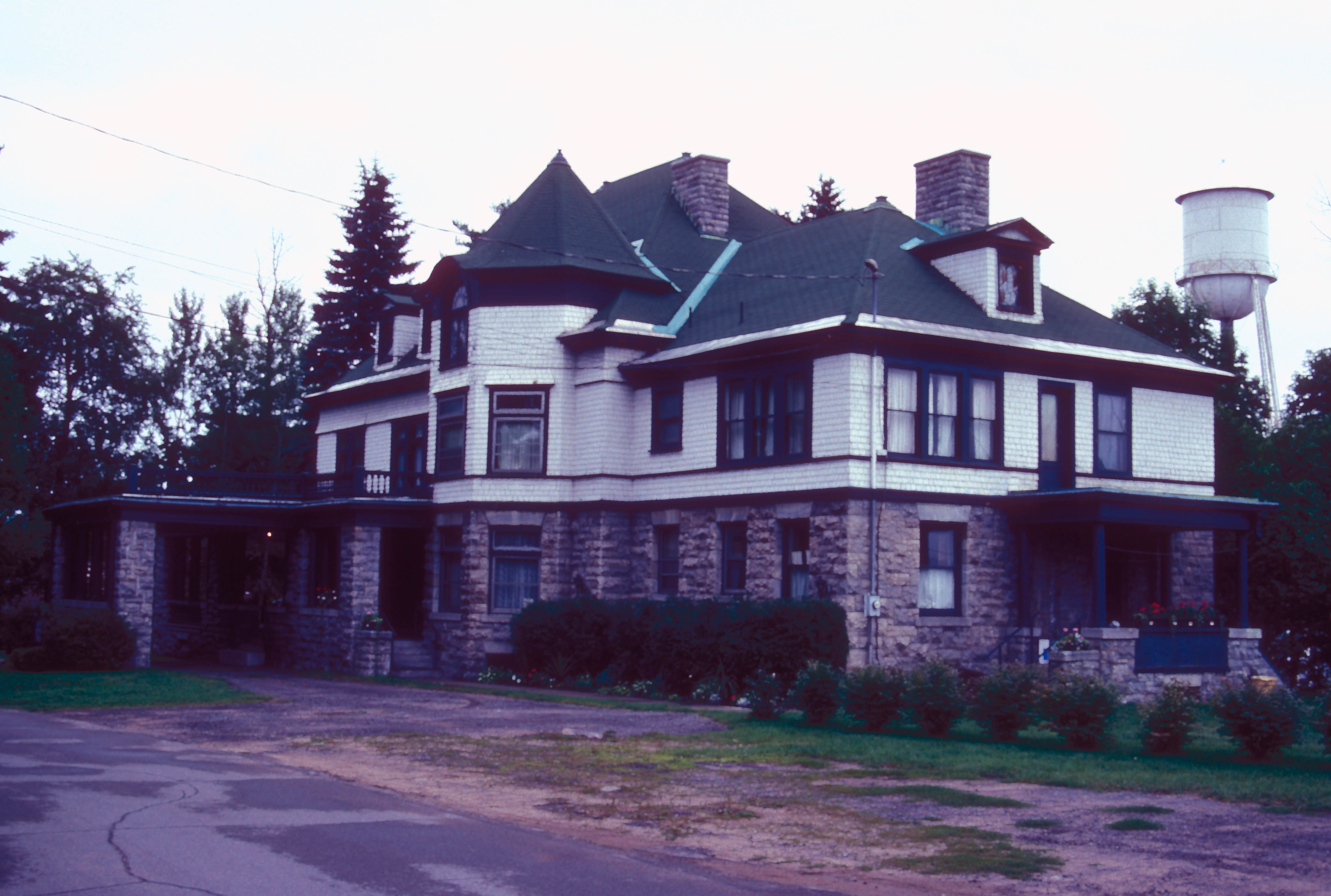

- Location within New York Location within the United States
- Location: Main St., Lyons Falls, New York
- Coordinates: 43°37′5″N 75°21′38″W
- Area: 0.5 acres (0.20 ha)
- Built: 1902
- Architect: Fuller & Pitcher
- Architectural style: Romanesque
- NRHP reference No.: 78001857
- Added to NRHP: April 19, 1978

Gould Mansion Complex is a historic home and national historic district located at Lyons Falls in Lewis County, New York. The district includes three contributing structures: the main house, carriage house and barn, and office building that served as headquarters for the Gould Paper Company.

It was listed on the National Register of Historic Places in 1978.
