= Mary Traffarn Whitney =

American minister (1852–1942)

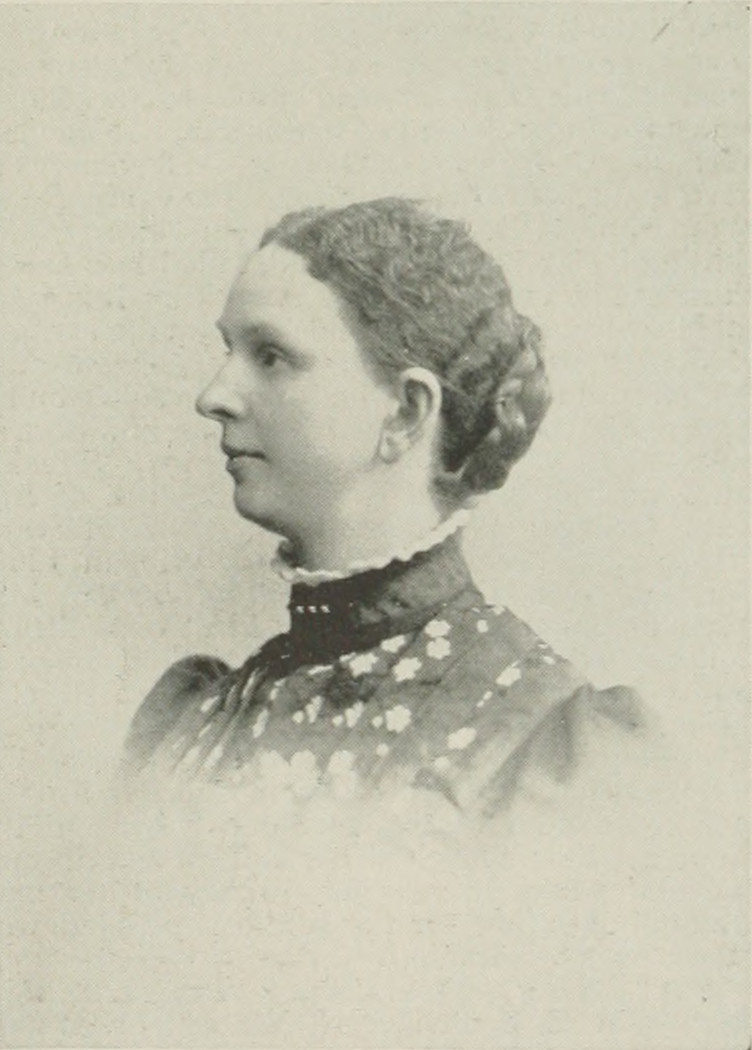
- Photo in A Woman of the Century
- Born: Mary Louise Traffarn; February 28, 1852; Alder Creek, New York, U.S.
- Died: March 8, 1942 (aged 90); Weare, New Hampshire, U.S.
- Education: Whitestown Seminary; Utica Free Academy; Clinton Industrial Institute; St. Lawrence University; Chicago Kindergarten Training School (now National Louis University)
- Occupations: Unitarian minister; editor; social reformer; philanthropist; lecturer
- Spouse: Herbert Ellerson Whitney (m. 1873)
- Children: 4

Mary Traffarn Whitney (February 28, 1852 – March 8, 1942) was an American minister and editor, as well as a social reformer, philanthropist and lecturer. She was one of the early Universalist women ministers, later changing her association to that of the Unitarian church. Whitney was the author of Honor between men and women (1896), FamilyCulture, the Science of Human Life (1897), Present Tendencies in Racial Improvement (1897), Hymns of Peace (1915), and Problems for seniors by a senior (1932).

== Early years and education ==
Mary Louise Traffarn was born at Alder Creek, New York, a hamlet of Boonville, February 28, 1852. Her father, Job Traffarn, was a descendant of an old Huguenot family, and from that ancestry, she inherited their love of truth and force of moral conviction. Her mother was named Sally.

Her early religious training was a combination of Universalist and Evangelical teaching, the former being received from her parents and the latter from the Methodist, Baptist, and Presbyterian preaching in the Union church of the hamlet and in the Evangelical Sunday-school.

She received the rudiments of her education in the Whitestown Seminary, the Utica Free Academy, and the Clinton Industrial Institute, at Clinton, New York. She graduated from the St. Lawrence University in 1872, obtained the degree of B. S. There, she was fond of mathematical, scientific and logical branches of study.

== Career ==
In 1873, in Utica, New York, she married Rev. Herbert Ellerson Whitney, a Universalist minister who later associated with the Unitarian church. She became an active assistant in his work, pursuing such lines of study as a busy life would permit, and teaching several terms with him in the old academy in Webster, New York. In 1881, she was graduated from the Chicago Kindergarten Training School (now National Louis University), and taught that system for two years.

She had preached and lectured occasionally up to 1885, when she became licensed to preach, and was asked to take charge of a Universalist church in Mount Pleasant, Iowa, which she did, finding in the ministry the real work of her life. Two years later (1887) she was ordained at Newport, New York, and afterwards, received the fellowship of the Unitarian denomination (1897). In the course of her life, she also taught for a year at the Webster, New York, Academy. In 1891, she became the first woman minister called to a Unitarian church in Boston, that being the Second Unitarian Church in West Somerville, Massachusetts.

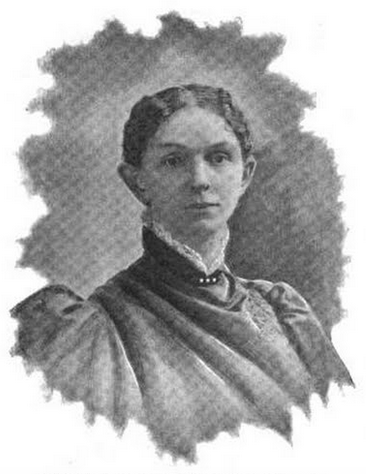
1892

The trend of her ministry was in the direction of the practical and spiritual, rather than the theoretic. The motive of her ministry was to add something to the helpful forces of the world. The secret of her success was hard work, making no account of difficulties. The methods and means of her progress included the habit of learning from experience and from passing events, taking great lessons for life from humble sources. As a lecturer on reform subjects, she was popular. She also took a deep interest in philanthropic work and the social problems of the day. Seeking the advancement of women, she felt that she might do most to promote that advancement by practically demonstrating in her own work that woman has a place in the ministry. In accord with this thought, her aim was to do her best in whatever place was open to her.

Whitney was associated with the South Boston Benevolent Fraternity of Churches (missionary work), Massachusetts Moral Education Association (president, 1899-1905), Woman's Christian Temperance Union (state superintendent of social purity), Senior Club in Bernardston, Massachusetts (organizer), South Boston Family Culture Institute (founder, president), and the Socialist Party of America (nominated as a candidate for United States Congress). She was a member of the Daughters of the American Colonists. Whitney served as editor of the South Boston Family Culture Institute's monthly magazine, Family Culture (1896–97).

Whitney was a speaker at the Vermont state women's suffrage conference in 1908.

== Personal life ==
The Whitneys were parents of four sons, Waldo (b. 1877), Frederick (b. 1879), Karl (b. 1882), and Leslie (b. 1884). She died March 8, 1942, at her home in Weare, New Hampshire.

== Selected works ==
- Honor between men and women, 1896
- FamilyCulture, the Science of Human Life, 1896–97
- Present Tendencies in Racial Improvement, 1897
- Hymns of Peace, 1915
- Problems for seniors by a senior, 1932
