= New York State Route 294 =

State highway in northern New York, US

New York State Route 294
- Map of Lewis and Oneida counties with NY 294 highlighted in red

Route information
- Maintained by NYSDOT
- Length: 6.82 mi (10.98 km)
- Existed: 1930–present

Major junctions
- West end: NY 26 in Lewis
- East end: NY 46 in Boonville

Location
- Country: United States
- State: New York
- Counties: Lewis, Oneida

Highway system
- New York Highways; Interstate; US; State; Reference; Parkways
← NY 293	→ I-295

New York State Route 294 (NY 294) is an east–west state highway in northern New York in the United States. It extends for just under 7 miles (11 km) from an intersection with NY 26 in the Lewis County town of Lewis to a junction with NY 46 in the Oneida County village of Boonville. The route serves the hamlet of West Leyden at its western terminus and the community of Redmond Center in the Oneida County town of Ava. NY 294 was assigned as part of the 1930 renumbering of state highways in New York.

== Route description ==
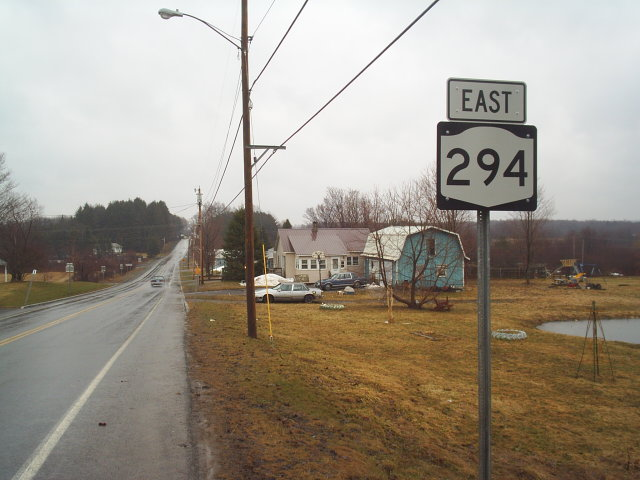
First reassurance marker on NY 294 eastbound in West Leyden

NY 294 begins at an intersection with NY 26 in the Lewis hamlet of West Leyden in southern Lewis County. Leaving a small strip of businesses and residences along NY 26, the road heads east into a mostly rural area. NY 294 crosses into Oneida County 0.75 miles (1.21 km) from NY 26 and passes through the Oneida County Reforestation Area, where the highway becomes surrounded by dense woods. After exiting the reforestation area, NY 294 heads across expansive farmlands before reaching a junction with County Route 67 (East Ava Road), which intersects from the south.

The highway continues east, traveling past occasional farmhouses as it gradually turns toward the northeast. It passes another farm before entering a more developed corridor, although the transition is subtle. NY 294 passes several residences on its way into the village of Boonville, located about 5.5 miles (8.9 km) from the route's western terminus, where the highway becomes Ford Street. The highway serves Adirondack High School on its way to entering the heavily developed center of Boonville. Here, it becomes lined with dozens of closely situated houses and resumes an eastward direction for the remainder of its length. The route passes Boonville Elementary School on its way to the center of Boonville, where it ends at a junction with NY 46 (Post Street).

== History ==
Sometime prior to 1923, the east–west highway connecting West Leyden to Boonville was selected to become a state highway by New York State Department of Highways Commissioner Frederick Stuart Greene, who had drawn up a map of proposed state highways in Oneida County and presented it to the New York State Legislature for approval. The mileage for the route came from part of either modern NY 12 or NY 12D, a segment of which had been designated a state road before it became part of Route 27, a legislative route, in 1908. By law, the mileage of any road previously designated as a state highway and later included as part of a legislative route would be reassigned to another highway, allowing the West Leyden–Boonville road to become state-maintained. The plan fell through when the legislature ultimately adopted another version of the state highway map that did not include the West Leyden–Boonville road.

In 1923, Boonville Town Supervisor Clarence R. Sperry visited Albany to lobby Commissioner Greene and the state legislature to add the road to the state highway system. Although Greene still favored the inclusion of the highway, the road had still not been added to the state highway system by 1926. Despite this fact, the road was designated as NY 294 as part of the 1930 renumbering of state highways in New York. It was finally accepted by the state and rebuilt to state highway standards by 1932.

== Major intersections ==
County	Location	mi	km	Destinations	Notes
Lewis	Lewis	0.00	0.00	NY 26 – Rome, Lowville	Western terminus; hamlet of West Leyden
Oneida	Village of Boonville	6.82	10.98	NY 46 (Post Street) to NY 12D	Eastern terminus
1.000 mi = 1.609 km; 1.000 km = 0.621 mi
