= Utica Free Academy =

High school in Utica, New York

Utica Free Academy

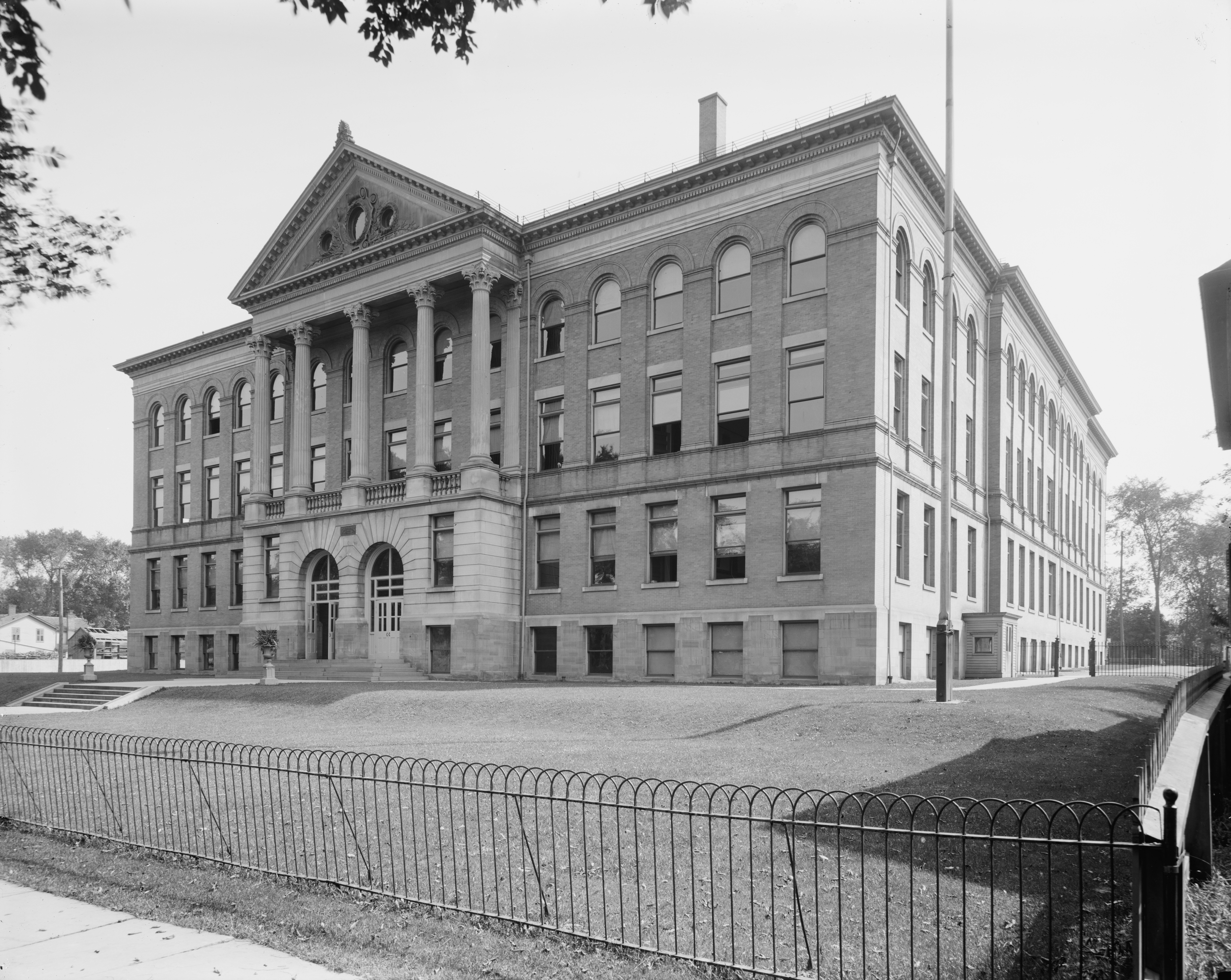
Utica Free Academy building viewed from Kemble Street, photo from circa 1910

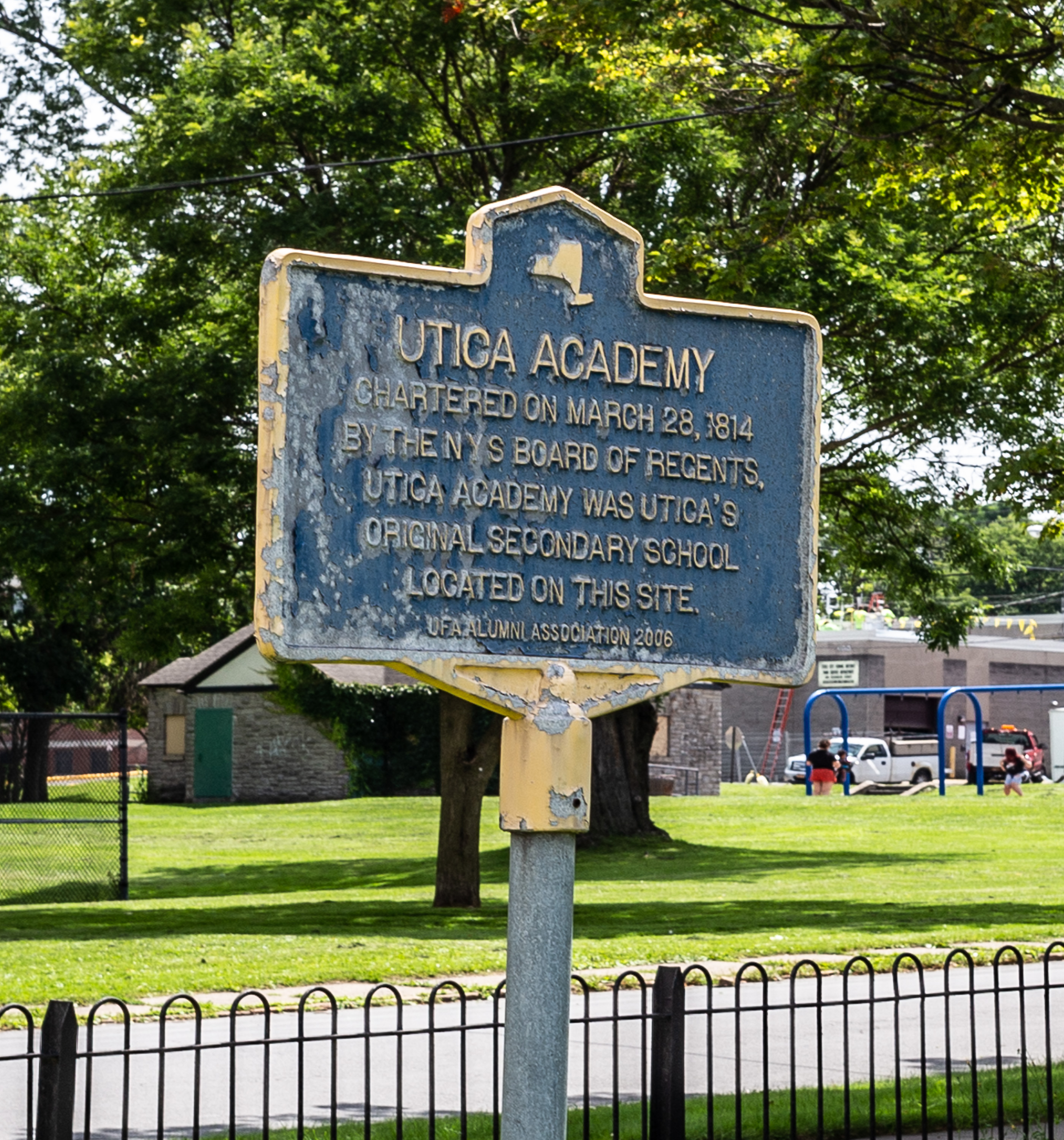
Historic plaque

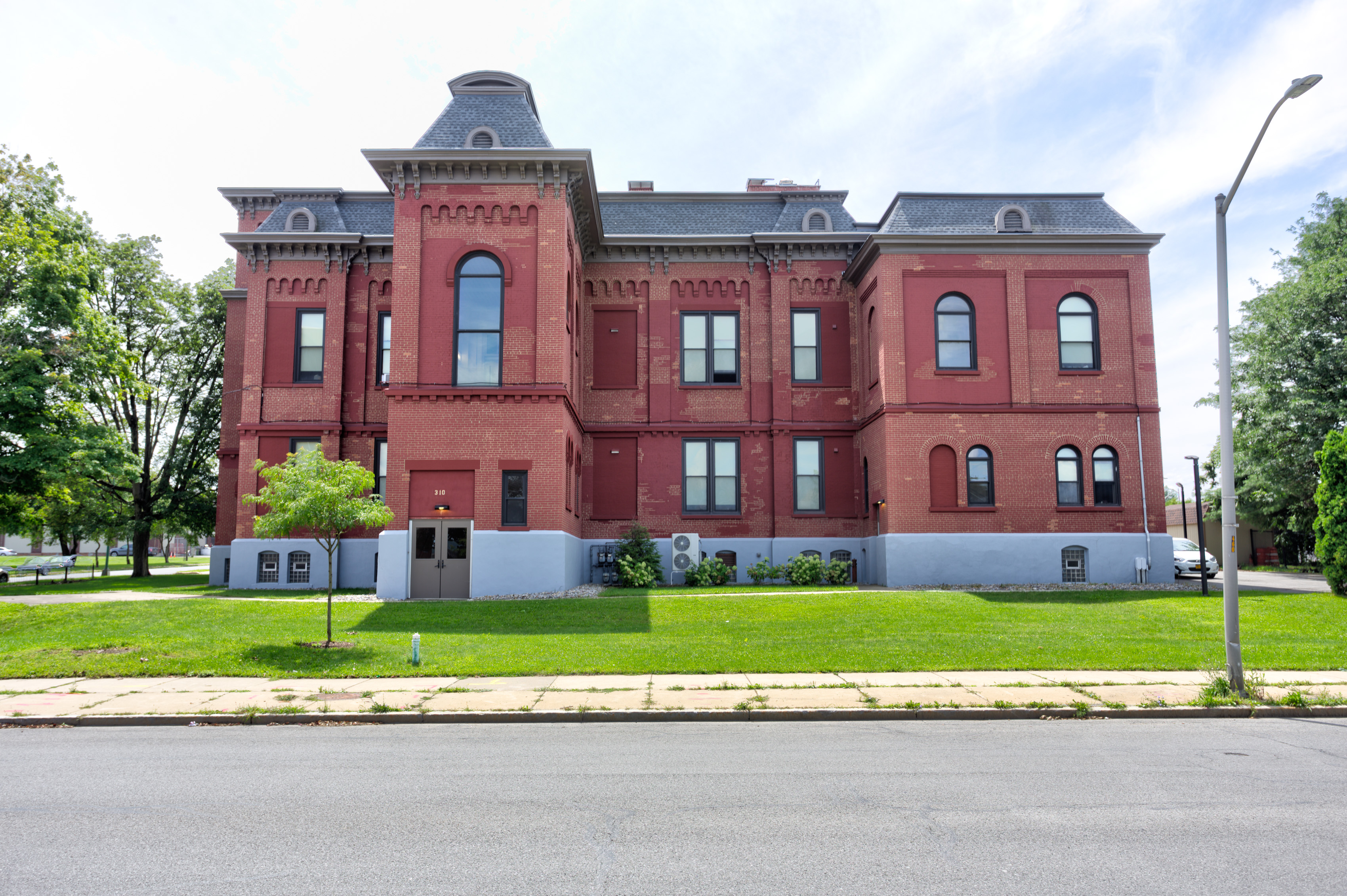
Utica Academy, Bleecker Street, 2021

Utica Free Academy, whose predecessor, Utica Academy, opened in 1814, was a high school in Utica, New York, which operated from 1840 until 1990, when it was consolidated with Thomas R. Proctor High School. The combined entity operated briefly at UFA's original facility under the name Utica Senior Academy, but by 1993 had been reverted to the Proctor name and heritage.

The last UFA building is now a nursing home.

== Notable alumni ==
- Dean Alfange (1897–1989), politician
- Richard H. Balch (1901–1984), businessperson and politician
- Tim Capstraw (b. 1960), basketball coach and broadcaster
- John D. Caton (1812–1895), chief justice of the Illinois Supreme Court
- Mark Danner (b. 1958), writer, journalist, and educator
- George Detore (1906–1991), professional baseball player
- Cyrus D. Prescott (1836–1902), politician and lawyer
- John Ballard Rendall (1847–1924), minister, Lincoln University president, and Pennsylvania state representative
- Walter Sheridan, an investigator for various agencies of the US government.
- Hal White (1919–2001), professional baseball player
- Mary Traffarn Whitney (1852–1942), minister, editor, social reformer, philanthropist, lecturer

== Notable faculty ==
- Charles Stuart (1783–1865), abolitionist, principal (1822–1829)
