= Lewis, Lewis County, New York =

Lewis, New York
- Town
- Location within New York Location within the United States
- Coordinates: 43°28′17″N 75°31′45″W
- Country: United States
- State: New York
- County: Lewis

Area
  - Total: 65.1 sq mi (168.7 km^{2})
  - Land: 64.6 sq mi (167.3 km^{2})
  - Water: 0.54 sq mi (1.4 km^{2})
- Elevation: 1,539 ft (469 m)

Population (2010)
  - Total: 854
  - Density: 13/sq mi (5.1/km^{2})
- Time zone: UTC-5 (Eastern (EST))
  - Summer (DST): UTC-4 (EDT)
- ZIP Codes: 13489 (West Leyden); 13309 (Boonville); 13316 (Camden); 13325 (Constableville); 13471 (Taberg)
- FIPS code: 36-42125
- GNIS feature ID: 979144
- Website: https://townoflewislcny.gov/

There is another Town of Lewis in Essex County, New York.

Lewis is a town in Lewis County, New York, United States. The population was 854 at the 2010 census. The town is named after its county, which is named after former governor, Morgan Lewis.

Lewis is situated on the southern border of the county and is north of Rome. Most of the town's population lives in the southern section.

== History ==
Settlement commenced circa 1800. Two families arrived in 1798, but left after approximately two years. Permanent settlers began appearing in 1799, and an influx of foreign settlers in 1831 helped populate the early town.

The town of Lewis was formed in 1852 from the towns of Leyden and West Turin.

== Geography ==
According to the United States Census Bureau, the town has a total area of 65.1 square miles (169 km^{2}), of which 64.6 square miles (167 km^{2}) are land and 0.5 square miles (1.3 km^{2}), or 0.83%, are water.

The southern town line is the border of Oneida County.

The headwaters of the Mohawk River are located in the eastern part of the town.

New York State Route 26 is a major north-south highway which passes through the eastern part of the town, where it intersects New York State Route 294 at West Leyden. The primary east-west route is County Road 46 (Osceola Road), which passes through the southern part of the town, connecting Leisher Mill to West Leyden.

== Demographics ==
Historical population
Census	Pop.	Note	%±
1860	1,407		—
1870	1,051		−25.3%
1880	941		−10.5%
1890	999		6.2%
1900	917		−8.2%
1910	801		−12.6%
1920	753		−6.0%
1930	677		−10.1%
1940	413		−39.0%
1950	584		41.4%
1960	587		0.5%
1970	649		10.6%
1980	720		10.9%
1990	858		19.2%
2000	857		−0.1%
2010	854		−0.4%
2014 (est.)	841		−1.5%
U.S. Decennial Census

As of the census of 2000, there were 857 people, 296 households, and 224 families residing in the town. The population density was 13.2 inhabitants per square mile (5.1/km^{2}). There were 440 housing units at an average density of 6.8 per square mile (2.6/km^{2}). The racial makeup of the town was 99.30% White, 0.35% African American and 0.35% Native American. Hispanic or Latino of any race were 0.35% of the population.

There were 296 households, out of which 43.6% had children under the age of 18 living with them, 58.4% were married couples living together, 9.5% had a female householder with no husband present, and 24.3% were non-families. 19.6% of all households were made up of individuals, and 7.1% had someone living alone who was 65 years of age or older. The average household size was 2.90 and the average family size was 3.33.

In the town, the population was spread out, with 32.8% under the age of 18, 7.5% from 18 to 24, 30.0% from 25 to 44, 18.7% from 45 to 64, and 11.1% who were 65 years of age or older. The median age was 34 years. For every 100 females, there were 103.1 males. For every 100 females age 18 and over, there were 106.5 males.

The median income for a household in the town was $36,696, and the median income for a family was $40,667. Males had a median income of $28,813 versus $25,000 for females. The per capita income for the town was $13,256. About 9.7% of families and 10.7% of the population were below the poverty line, including 4.7% of those under age 18 and 18.3% of those age 65 or over.

== Communities and locations in the town ==
- Fey Mill – A hamlet in the south central part of the town.
- Fish Creek – (1) A hamlet near the northeastern town line. (2) A stream flowing out the southern part of Lewis.
- Fish Creek Reservoir – A reservoir south of Swancott Mill.
- Freeman Mill – A hamlet northwest of Parson Mill.
- Parson Mill – A hamlet west of Fey Mill on County Road 46.
- Prussian Settlement – A location west of West Leyden on County Road 46 at the intersection of Kirk Road. This location is marked by a few houses and a cemetery.
- Sunset Corners – A location in the north central part of the town, north of Freeman Mill.
- Swancott Mill – A hamlet on County Road 46 west of Freeman Mill.
- Swancott Hill State Forest – A state forest tract by the southern town line, south of Swancott Mill.
- West Leyden – A hamlet in the eastern part of the town on NY-26 near its intersection with NY-294 and County Roads 46 and 47.
