= Boonville-Oneida County Fairgrounds =

Fairground in New York, U.S.

Boonville - Oneida County Fairgrounds
- Interactive map of Boonville - Oneida County Fairgrounds
- Location: Boonville, New York
- Coordinates: 43.4815°N 75.3554°W
- Area: 20 acres (8.1 hectares)
- Operator: Boonville Fair Association
- Status: Open
- Website: Official website

The Boonville-Oneida County Fairgrounds is the home of the annual Oneida County Fair. The fairgrounds are open year-round and host a number of events. It is located on Ford Street in Boonville, New York.

== Overview ==
The Boonville Union Agricultural Society, which was organized in 1871, held fairs for a number of years on the grounds leased from the Boonville Driving Park Association. By 1888 the Boonville Fair Association had assumed responsibility for the annual event, and in 1905, the Fair Association purchased the lands from the Driving Park Association.

The Oneida County Agricultural Society held the Oneida County Fair in Rome, New York from 1841 through 1928, when it was dissolved for financial reasons. Regional fairs continued in Oneida County at Boonville, New Hartford, Remsen, and Vernon. In 1972 Oneida County Executive Bill Bryant dubbed the Boonville Fair as the "official" Oneida County Fair, creating a public-private partnership that renamed it the Boonville-Oneida County Fair.

== Grandstand and track ==
The original track at the fairgrounds was square and included neighboring property sold off as building lots during the Depression. The original grandstand faced west but was moved in the early 1930s using rollers and mules to its present location.

== Events ==
=== Agricultural fair ===
The annual fair runs from the last week of July and features exhibits, midway rides, live entertainment and special events. Events include a kids' tractor pedal pull, the 4-H Dog Show, Clydesdale wagon rides, pro wrestling and harness racing.

=== Snowmobile racing ===
The Adirondack Cup began in the early 1960s, drawing more than 40,000 snowmobile fans to the Fairgrounds and earning the town worldwide recognition. After a pause in the late 1970s, snowmobile racing returned in 2007 with the formation of the Boonville Snow Festival II.

=== Woodsmen's field days ===
The NYS Woodsmen Field Days are held at the Fairgrounds the third full weekend in August. The event was founded by the Rev. Frank Reed in 1948 to honor the forestry industry and has evolved into one of the predominant lumberjack contests in the United States today. Contestants come from as far away as Canada, Australia and New Zealand to compete in the festivities. Woodsmen's contests are held all weekend while hundreds of displays of various forestry related equipment, chainsaw carving demonstrations, safety demonstrations are showcased .
