= Erwin Library and Pratt House =

Historic house in New York, United States

- U.S. National Register of Historic Places
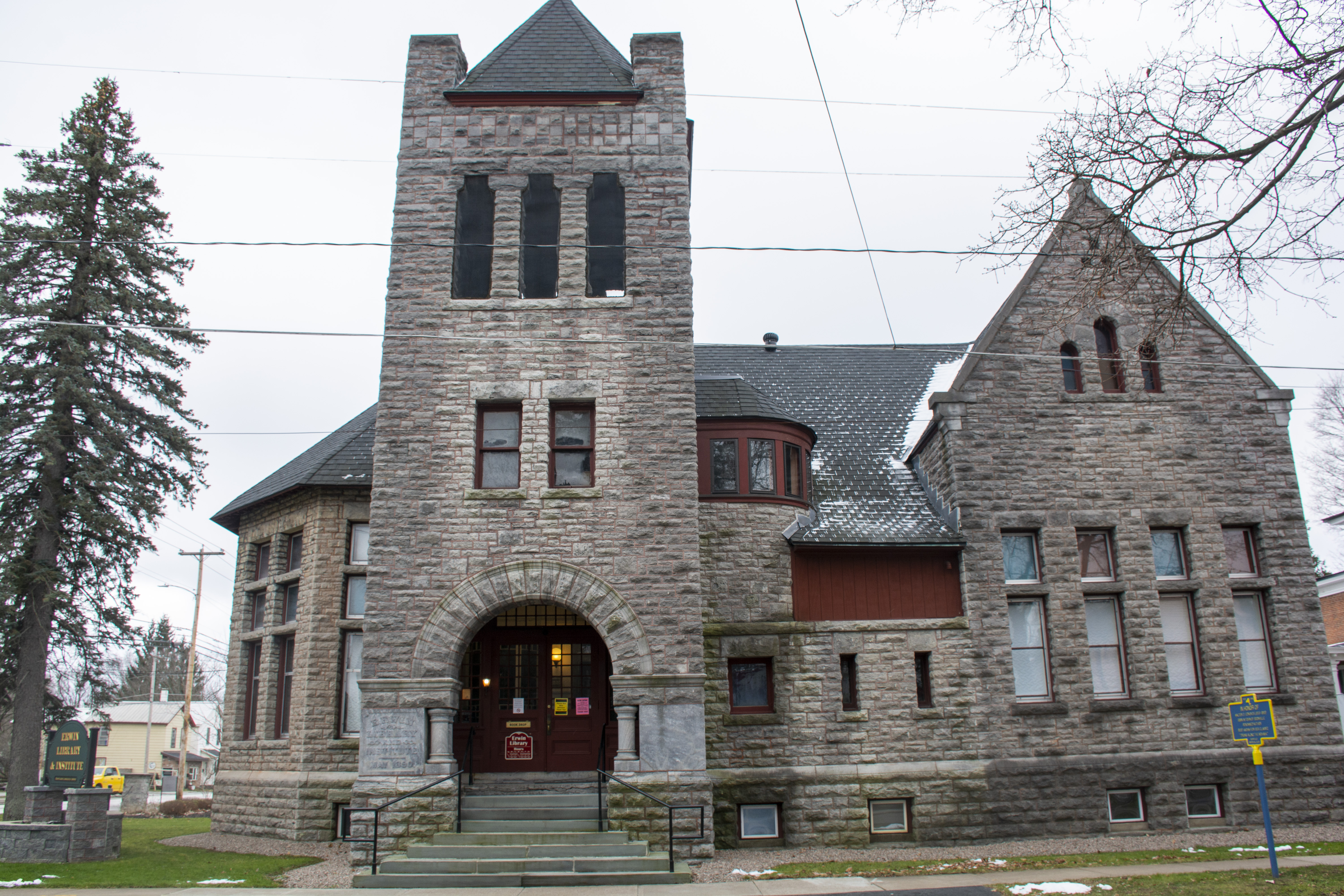

- Location within New York Location within the United States
- Location: 104 and 106 Schuyler St., Boonville, New York
- Coordinates: 43°29′2″N 75°20′13″W
- Area: 0.5 acres (0.20 ha)
- Built: 1875
- Architect: Vivian, C.L.; Lathrop, J.B.
- Architectural style: Late Victorian, Romanesque, Richardsonian Romanesque
- NRHP reference No.: 73001228
- Added to NRHP: August 14, 1973

Erwin Library and Pratt House is a historic library building and house located in Boonville in Oneida County, New York. The library building was built in 1890 of rock-faced local limestone with a square tower at the entrance. The Pratt House was constructed in 1875. It is of brick with a foundation of smooth limestone and a mansard roof with a central tower.

It was listed on the National Register of Historic Places in 1973.
