= Wildwood Cemetery and Mary Lyon Fisher Memorial Chapel =

Historic cemetery in New York, United States

- U.S. National Register of Historic Places
- Location within New York Location within the United States
- Location: River Rd., Lyons Falls, New York
- Coordinates: 43°36′30″N 75°20′43″W
- Area: 37 acres (15 ha)
- Built: 1906, 1921
- Built by: W. H. Rich & Sons
- Architect: Gouge & Ames
- Architectural style: Late Gothic Revival
- NRHP reference No.: 11000403
- Added to NRHP: June 27, 2011

Wildwood Cemetery and Mary Lyon Fisher Memorial Chapel is a historic cemetery and chapel located at Lyons Falls in Lewis County, New York. The cemetery was established in 1906, and the chapel constructed in 1921. It remains an active burial ground containing 736 marked burials. The memorial chapel is a two-story, masonry building in the Late Gothic Revival style designed by Utica architects Gouge & Ames. It consists of a rectangular main section, measuring 19 feet by 24 feet, with a rear chancel addition measuring 9 feet by 15 feet. Also in the cemetery is a contributing plaque to Caleb Lyon Sr.

It was listed on the National Register of Historic Places in 2011.
