= Forest Presbyterian Church =

Historic church in New York, United States

- U.S. National Register of Historic Places
- Location within New York Location within the United States
- Location: 4109 Center St., Lyons Falls, New York
- Coordinates: 43°37′5″N 75°21′41″W
- Area: less than one acre
- Built: 1894
- Architect: Fuller & Wheeler
- Architectural style: Shingle Style, Gothic Revival
- NRHP reference No.: 04001060
- Added to NRHP: September 24, 2004

Forest Presbyterian Church is a historic Presbyterian church located at Lyons Falls in Lewis County, New York. It was built in 1894 and is a one-story, brown stained, eclectic, pitched roof building with a front-facing gable, a unique square bell tower with flared eaves, and a porte cochere. The church is in the Shingle Style with Gothic elements. Also on the property is the two story, American Foursquare manse, dated to 1902, and a 19th-century barn.

It was listed on the National Register of Historic Places in 2004.
