= Lyons Falls, New York =

Lyons Falls, New York High Falls, Lyon's Falls
- Village
- Location within New York Location within the United States
- Coordinates: 43°37′1″N 75°21′42″W
- Country: United States
- State: New York
- County: Lewis
- Towns: West Turin, Lyonsdale

Area
  - Total: 1.07 sq mi (2.77 km^{2})
  - Land: 0.97 sq mi (2.52 km^{2})
  - Water: 0.097 sq mi (0.25 km^{2})
- Elevation: 830 ft (253 m)

Population (2020)
  - Total: 570
  - Density: 584.8/sq mi (225.81/km^{2})
- Time zone: UTC-5 (Eastern (EST))
  - Summer (DST): UTC-4 (EDT)
- ZIP code: 13368
- Area code: 315
- FIPS code: 36-44006
- GNIS feature ID: 956202
- Website: https://lyonsfallsny.gov/

Lyons Falls is a village in Lewis County, New York, United States. As of the 2020 census, Lyons Falls had a population of 570. The village is on the border of the towns of West Turin and Lyonsdale. It is at the junction of state Routes 12 and 12D, approximately 14 miles (23 km) south of Lowville, the county seat.

== History ==
The village was at the northern end of the Black River Canal, when it was completed in 1858.

The Forest Presbyterian Church, Gould Mansion Complex, and The Pines are listed on the National Register of Historic Places. The Wildwood Cemetery and Mary Lyon Fisher Memorial Chapel was added in 2011.

== Geography ==
Lyons Falls is located in southern Lewis County at 43°37′1″N 75°21′42″W (43.616984, -75.361750). According to the United States Census Bureau, the village has a total area of 1.1 square miles (2.8 km^{2}), of which 1.0 square mile (2.5 km^{2}) are land and 0.1 square miles (0.3 km^{2}), or 9.03%, are water. The village is situated at a 70-foot (21 m) waterfall on the Black River, which flows northward through the village and is joined from the east just above the falls by the Moose River. Most of the village is in the town of West Turin, on the west side of the Black River, while a less densely developed part of the village, including Riverside Park, is in the town of Lyonsdale on the east side of the river.

New York State Route 12 passes through the west side of the village, leading north 14 miles (23 km) to Lowville and south 10 miles (16 km) to Boonville. Route 12D crosses Route 12 on an overpass, with connection via Cherry Street. 12D leads south to Boonville as well, following a more westerly 11-mile (18 km) route.

== Demographics ==
Historical population
Census	Pop.	Note	%±
1900	470		—
1910	759		61.5%
1920	818		7.8%
1930	882		7.8%
1940	818		−7.3%
1950	864		5.6%
1960	887		2.7%
1970	852		−3.9%
1980	755		−11.4%
1990	698		−7.5%
2000	591		−15.3%
2010	566		−4.2%
2020	570		0.7%
U.S. Decennial Census

As of the census of 2000, there were 591 people, 238 households, and 157 families residing in the village. The population density was 602.1 inhabitants per square mile (232.5/km^{2}). There were 294 housing units at an average density of 299.5 per square mile (115.6/km^{2}). The racial makeup of the village was 98.82% White, 0.68% from other races, and 0.51% from two or more races. Hispanic or Latino of any race were 0.17% of the population.

There were 238 households, out of which 26.9% had children under the age of 18 living with them, 48.7% were married couples living together, 11.8% had a female householder with no husband present, and 34.0% were non-families. 27.7% of all households were made up of individuals, and 16.8% had someone living alone who was 65 years of age or older. The average household size was 2.48 and the average family size was 3.01.

In the village, the population was spread out, with 23.7% under the age of 18, 9.3% from 18 to 24, 23.5% from 25 to 44, 26.7% from 45 to 64, and 16.8% who were 65 years of age or older. The median age was 40 years. For every 100 females, there were 110.3 males. For every 100 females age 18 and over, there were 100.4 males.

The median income for a household in the village was $27,375, and the median income for a family was $41,250. Males had a median income of $35,000 versus $21,071 for females. The per capita income for the village was $17,204. About 12.9% of families and 16.7% of the population were below the poverty line, including 16.2% of those under age 18 and 15.3% of those age 65 or over.
