= Boonville, New York =

- Town
- Location in Oneida County and the state of New York.
- Coordinates: 43°29′04″N 75°19′52″W
- Country: United States
- State: New York
- County: Oneida
- Settled: c.1795
- Created: 1805

Government
  - Type: Town Council
  - Town Supervisor: David Stocklosa (R)
  - Town Council: Members: • Harold "Dick" Le Clar (R); • David Stocklosa (R); • Michael Croneiser (R); • Ted Muha (R)

Area
  - Total: 72.58 sq mi (187.97 km^{2})
  - Land: 71.81 sq mi (185.99 km^{2})
  - Water: 0.76 sq mi (1.98 km^{2})

Population (2010)
  - Total: 4,555
  - Estimate (2016): 4,536
  - Density: 63.2/sq mi (24.39/km^{2})
- Time zone: UTC-5 (Eastern (EST))
  - Summer (DST): UTC-4 (EDT)
- ZIP Codes: 13309 (Boonville); 13301 (Alder Creek); 13338 (Forestport)
- FIPS code: 36-065-07366
- Website: www.townofboonvilleny.gov

Boonville is a town in Oneida County, New York, United States. The town is in the northeastern section of the county. The population was 4,518 at the 2020 census. The town includes a village, also called Boonville. The town and village are named after Gerrit Boon, an agent of the Holland Land Company. As of 2024, the village's mayor is Judith Dellerba.

== History ==
The town was first settled c. 1795. The Town of Boonville was created in 1805 from the Town of Leyden.

== Geography ==
According to the United States Census Bureau, the town has a total area of 72.6 square miles (188.0 km^{2}), of which 71.9 square miles (186.2 km^{2}) is land and 0.7 square mile (1.8 km^{2}) (0.95%) is water.

The northern town line is the border of Lewis County, and the eastern town boundary is the Black River.

== Demographics ==
Historical population
Census	Pop.	Note	%±
1810	393		—
1820	1,294		229.3%
1830	2,746		112.2%
1840	5,519		101.0%
1850	3,309		−40.0%
1860	4,212		27.3%
1870	4,106		−2.5%
1880	3,996		−2.7%
1890	3,509		−12.2%
1900	3,332		−5.0%
1910	3,191		−4.2%
1920	3,147		−1.4%
1930	3,320		5.5%
1940	3,201		−3.6%
1950	3,593		12.2%
1960	3,786		5.4%
1970	3,947		4.3%
1980	4,094		3.7%
1990	4,246		3.7%
2000	4,572		7.7%
2010	4,555		−0.4%
2020	4,518		−0.8%
U.S. Decennial Census

As of the census of 2000, there were 4,572 people, 1,781 households, and 1,209 families residing in the town. The population density was 63.6 inhabitants per square mile (24.6/km^{2}). There were 2,138 housing units at an average density of 29.7 per square mile (11.5/km^{2}). The racial makeup of the town was 99.21% White, 0.07% Black or African American, 0.15% Native American, 0.13% Asian, 0.02% Pacific Islander, and 0.42% from two or more races. Hispanic or Latino of any race were 0.17% of the population.

There were 1,781 households, of which 31.3% had children under 18 living with them, 53.7% were married couples living together, 9.0% had a female householder with no husband present, and 32.1% were non-families. 26.8% of all households were made up of individuals, and 12.9% had someone living alone 65 or older. The average household size was 2.47 and the average family size 2.98.

In the town, the population was 24.5% under 18, 6.4% from 18 to 24, 28.3% from 25 to 44, 22.9% from 45 to 64, and 18.0% age 65 or older. The median age was 39. For every 100 females, there were 95.9 males. For every 100 females age 18 and over, there were 91.5 males.

The median income for a household was $36,744, and the median for a family $40,845. Males had a median income of $30,992 versus $21,362 for females. The per capita income for the town was $16,704. About 8.2% of families and 11.0% of the population were below the poverty line, including 13.1% of those under 18 and 9.9% of those 65 or over.

== Recreation ==
Boonville is a snowmobile tourist destination and has revitalized the Snow Festivals. Consequently, it has accepted the nickname "The Snow Capital of the East." In 2008 more than 6,000 people traveled to the Oneida County Fairgrounds in Boonville to watch vintage and professional snowmobile races on a half-mile oval ice track. In 2013 over 44,000 people visited the fairgrounds to attend the annual Woodsmen's Field Days, setting a record for attendance.

The fairgrounds in Boonville are also home of Oneida County Fair and the Woodsman Field Days.

The former Black River Canal was constructed to connect to the Erie Canal.

== Communities and locations in the Town of Boonville ==
- Alder Creek - A hamlet at the junction of state routes 12 and 28.
- Alder Creek Station - A location in the southeastern part of the town, west of Alder Creek.
- Boonville - The Village of Boonville is on NY 12 at 12D.
- Hawkinsville - A hamlet east of Boonville village, near the Black River.
- Hurlbutville - A hamlet in the southwestern part of the town.
- Jackson Hill- An elevation located south of Boonville.
- Park Hill - An elevation located east of Boonville.
- Pixley Falls - A waterfall located within Pixley Falls State Park.
- Pixley Falls State Park - Located on NY 46 several miles south of the Village of Boonville and adjacent to Hurlbutville.
- Potato Hill - An elevation located southeast of Boonville.
- Sperry Hill - An elevation located east of Boonville.

== Climate ==
This climatic region is typified by large seasonal temperature differences, with warm to hot (and often humid) summers and cold (sometimes severely cold) winters. According to the Köppen Climate Classification system, Boonville has a humid continental climate, abbreviated "Dfb" on climate maps. Seasonal climate vary greatly as winters are freezing and very snowy and summers are warm. Precipitation occurs at about the same amount for each month and is greater than areas to the south. However, precipitation in the winter comes with significant snowfall due to the lake effect.

Climate data for Boonville, New York, 1991–2020 normals, extremes 1949–present: 1550ft (472m)
Month	Jan	Feb	Mar	Apr	May	Jun	Jul	Aug	Sep	Oct	Nov	Dec	Year
Record high °F (°C)	61 (16)	63 (17)	77 (25)	86 (30)	89 (32)	90 (32)	94 (34)	93 (34)	90 (32)	82 (28)	74 (23)	74 (23)	94 (34)
Mean maximum °F (°C)	45 (7)	45 (7)	57 (14)	73 (23)	80 (27)	84 (29)	85 (29)	84 (29)	81 (27)	73 (23)	62 (17)	50 (10)	87 (31)
Mean daily maximum °F (°C)	24.6 (−4.1)	27.2 (−2.7)	35.5 (1.9)	49.5 (9.7)	63.0 (17.2)	70.9 (21.6)	74.9 (23.8)	73.9 (23.3)	66.8 (19.3)	54.0 (12.2)	41.3 (5.2)	30.2 (−1.0)	51.0 (10.5)
Daily mean °F (°C)	16.4 (−8.7)	18.3 (−7.6)	26.6 (−3.0)	39.9 (4.4)	52.8 (11.6)	61.3 (16.3)	65.5 (18.6)	64.4 (18.0)	57.2 (14.0)	45.3 (7.4)	33.7 (0.9)	23.1 (−4.9)	42.0 (5.6)
Mean daily minimum °F (°C)	8.2 (−13.2)	9.3 (−12.6)	17.6 (−8.0)	30.2 (−1.0)	42.6 (5.9)	51.6 (10.9)	56.2 (13.4)	55.0 (12.8)	47.6 (8.7)	36.6 (2.6)	26.0 (−3.3)	16.0 (−8.9)	33.1 (0.6)
Mean minimum °F (°C)	−15 (−26)	−12 (−24)	−2 (−19)	16 (−9)	29 (−2)	38 (3)	45 (7)	42 (6)	33 (1)	22 (−6)	10 (−12)	−7 (−22)	−19 (−28)
Record low °F (°C)	−31 (−35)	−29 (−34)	−26 (−32)	−1 (−18)	18 (−8)	29 (−2)	32 (0)	35 (2)	24 (−4)	14 (−10)	−8 (−22)	−23 (−31)	−31 (−35)
Average precipitation inches (mm)	4.92 (125)	3.97 (101)	4.15 (105)	4.56 (116)	4.64 (118)	5.27 (134)	4.60 (117)	4.69 (119)	4.94 (125)	6.11 (155)	5.04 (128)	5.27 (134)	58.16 (1,477)
Average snowfall inches (cm)	39.7 (101)	39.2 (100)	26.7 (68)	6.2 (16)	0.2 (0.51)	0.0 (0.0)	0.0 (0.0)	0.0 (0.0)	0.0 (0.0)	1.4 (3.6)	15.5 (39)	35.1 (89)	164 (417.11)
Average precipitation days (≥ 0.01 in)	19.6	15.7	14.7	14.3	14.2	13.5	13.0	12.7	12.6	16.2	15.6	18.9	181
Average snowy days (≥ 0.1 in)	16.8	15.9	12.7	3.7	0.2	0.0	0.0	0.0	0.0	1.1	8.9	16.6	75.9
Source 1: NOAA
Source 2: National Weather Service

== Education ==
The majority of the town, including the portion with the village, is in the Adirondack Central School District. A small portion of the town is in the Remsen Central School District.

== Residents ==
- Colonel Charles Wheelock, colonel during the Civil War who helped organize and led the 97th New York Infantry Regiment
