= Alder Creek, New York =

Hamlet in the state of New York, United States

- Hamlet
- Location within New York Location within the United States
- Coordinates: 43°25′24″N 75°13′41″W
- Country: United States
- State: New York
- County: Oneida
- Elevation: 1,194 ft (364 m)
- Time zone: UTC-5 (Eastern (EST))
  - Summer (DST): UTC-4 (EDT)
- ZIP code: 13301
- Area codes: 315 & 680
- GNIS feature ID: 942276

Alder Creek is a hamlet in Oneida County, New York, United States. The community is located at the intersection of New York State routes 12 and 28, 6.9 miles (11.1 km) southeast of Boonville. Alder Creek has a post office with ZIP code 13301.

== Notable person ==
- Mary Traffarn Whitney (1852–1942), minister, editor, social reformer, philanthropist, lecturer
