= Boonville (village), New York =

Boonville, New York
- Village
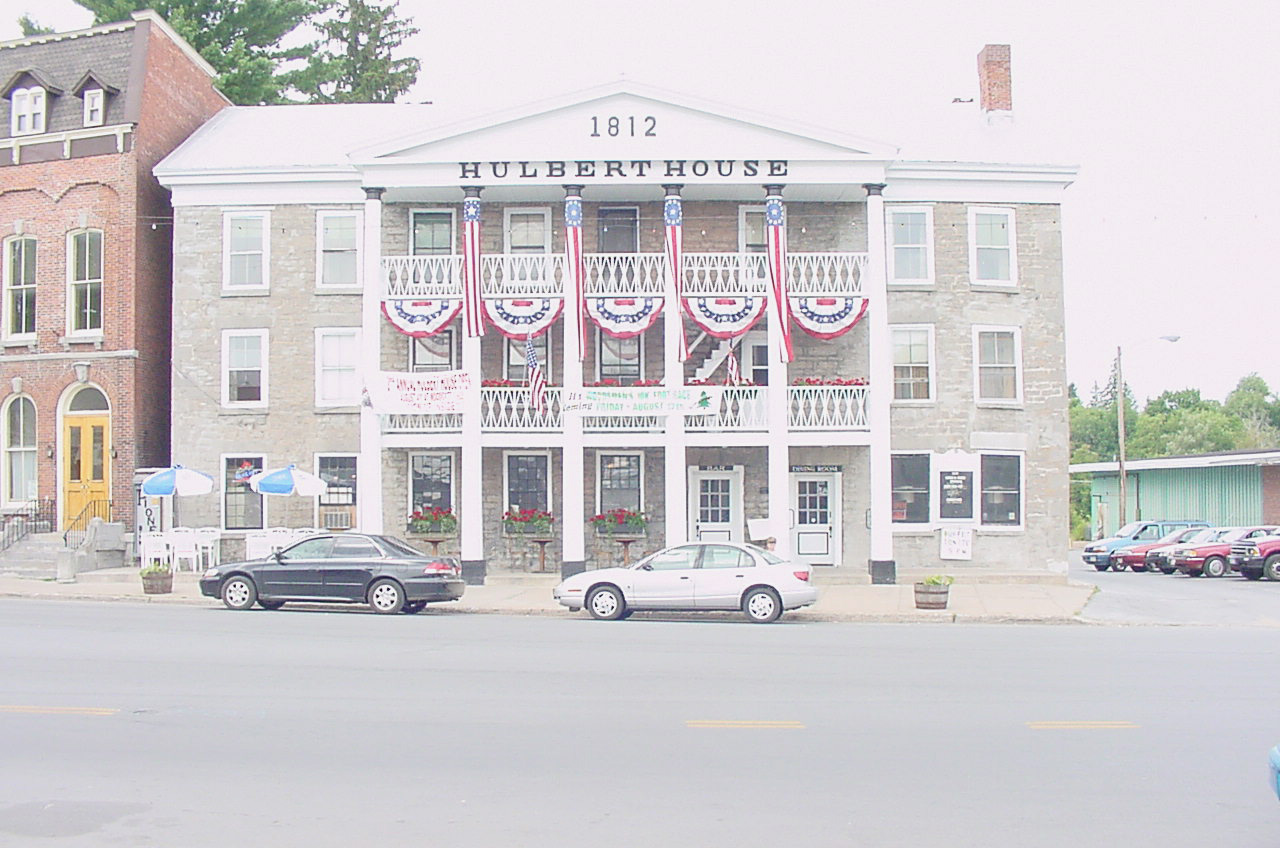
- The Hulbert House

- Location in Oneida County and the state of New York.
- Coordinates: 43°28′53″N 75°19′47″W
- Country: United States
- State: New York
- County: Oneida
- Settled: 1795
- Incorporated: 1855

Area
  - Total: 1.73 sq mi (4.49 km^{2})
  - Land: 1.73 sq mi (4.48 km^{2})
  - Water: 0.0039 sq mi (0.01 km^{2})
- Elevation: 1,142 ft (348 m)

Population (2020)
  - Total: 2,020
  - Density: 1,168.1/sq mi (450.99/km^{2})
- Time zone: UTC-5 (Eastern (EST))
  - Summer (DST): UTC-4 (EDT)
- ZIP code: 13309
- Area code: 315
- FIPS code: 36-07355
- GNIS feature ID: 2391556
- Website: www.villageofboonvilleny.com

Boonville is a village in Oneida County, New York, United States. The population was 2,072 at the 2010 census. The village is named after Gerrit Boon, an agent of the Holland Land Company. It is located within the town Boonville in the northern part of Oneida County, north of Utica.

== History ==
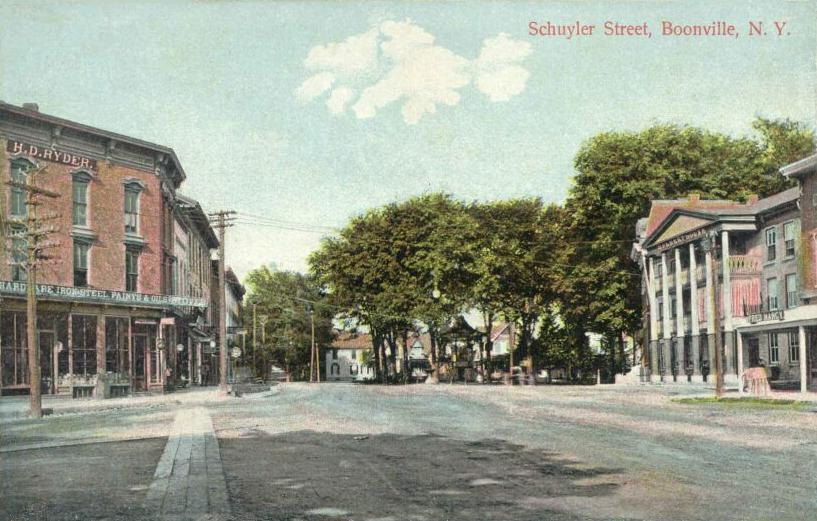
Schuyler Street c. 1910

The first settlement, initiated by Gerrit Boon from Leiden, the Netherlands, was made in 1795. The village was incorporated in 1855. The original name of the community, provided by Boon, was "Kortenaer" (after Egbert Bartholomeusz Kortenaer, a Dutch admiral).

Andrew Edmunds was credited with being the founder of Boonville. Edmunds had arrived with Garrit Boon, who is believed to be the first to attempt permanent settlement in Boonville in the spring of 1795. Both men arrived together, constructed a sawmill on Mill Creek, only for it to be completely destroyed by fire when adding a gristmill. As winter approached, Boon and Edmunds relocated to Barneveld to return in the spring to rebuild the saw mills and welcome other settlers on behalf of the land company.

In 1812 or 1819 the Hulbert House was established and currently stands on the town square in Boonville. This inn is known as the first two-story building to be built in the village of Boonville. Although, historians disagree as to which year the Hulbert House was built, they agree that it was built by Ephraim Owens.

In the 1800s it is said to have been the most famous hotel between Erie Canal and the St. Lawrence River. The Hulbert House was originally built as a hotel and inn and has the same functions in current day.

In the 1830s to the 1850s the Black River Canal was designed and constructed to connect the Erie Canal(Barge) to the Black River from Rome to Boonville - a distance of 25 miles. This section, connecting Rome and Boonville, is known as the Southern section of the overland canal. It's constructed of 70 locks to lift the boats and water 693 feet. The Northern section of the overland canal connected Boonville and Lyons Falls, 10 miles in distance and requiring 39 locks to descend the boats and water 386 feet. In all, the Black River Canal had 109 locks and is still a world record.

The Black River Canal had a vital role in the livelihood of the North Countries growth and prosperity, giving it access to Eastern and Midwestern markets to help preserve, house, and display artifacts from the canal era. A museum was constructed. The museum is located on a site formerly occupied by Titus Powers Iron Works, built circa 1850 near the Main Street Bridge. Later this site became the Holdrige and Gilbert Foundry and Machine Shop.

In 1933, a significant clash occurred between the state police and farmers here.

In 1983, a tornado ripped through Boonville.

In 2004, Ethan Allen Interiors, a major employer in the village, closed down leaving many residents looking for work.

In 2020, several residential and commercial buildings along Main Street were destroyed by a fire. Fire departments from nine nearby towns participated in the containment effort.

The Boonville Historic District, Erwin Library and Pratt House, Black River Canal Warehouse, Five Lock Combine and Locks 37 and 38, Black River Canal, and United States Post Office are listed on the National Register of Historic Places.

== Geography ==
Boonville is located at 43°28′59″N 75°19′55″W (43.483201, -75.331945).

According to the United States Census Bureau, the village has a total area of 1.8 square miles (4.6 km^{2}), all land.

Boonville is at the convergence of NYS Route 12, NYS Route 12D, NYS Route 46 and NYS Route 294.

The geographic region is called the Tug Hill Plateau.

== Demographics ==
Historical population
| Census | Pop. | Note | %± |
|---|---|---|---|
| 1840 | 600 | | — |
| 1850 | 700 | | 16.7% |
| 1860 | 1,240 | | 77.1% |
| 1870 | 1,418 | | 14.4% |
| 1880 | 1,677 | | 18.3% |
| 1890 | 1,613 | | −3.8% |
| 1900 | 1,745 | | 8.2% |
| 1910 | 1,794 | | 2.8% |
| 1920 | 1,914 | | 6.7% |
| 1930 | 2,090 | | 9.2% |
| 1940 | 2,076 | | −0.7% |
| 1950 | 2,329 | | 12.2% |
| 1960 | 2,403 | | 3.2% |
| 1970 | 2,488 | | 3.5% |
| 1980 | 2,344 | | −5.8% |
| 1990 | 2,220 | | −5.3% |
| 2000 | 2,138 | | −3.7% |
| 2010 | 2,072 | | −3.1% |
| 2020 | 2,020 | | −2.5% |
U.S. Decennial Census

As of the census of 2000, there were 2,138 people, 877 households, and 537 families residing in the village. The population density was 1,202.0 inhabitants per square mile (464.1/km^{2}). There were 960 housing units at an average density of 539.7 per square mile (208.4/km^{2}). The racial makeup of the village was 99.49% White, 0.05% Black or African American, 0.19% Native American, 0.05% Pacific Islander, and 0.23% from two or more races. Hispanic or Latino of any race were 0.23% of the population.

There were 877 households, out of which 28.2% had children under the age of 18 living with them, 45.6% were married couples living together, 11.4% had a female householder with no husband present, and 38.7% were non-families. 33.8% of all households were made up of individuals, and 18.0% had someone living alone who was 65 years of age or older. The average household size was 2.26 and the average family size was 2.86. In the village, the population was spread out, with 22.4% under the age of 18, 6.0% from 18 to 24, 26.1% from 25 to 44, 22.0% from 45 to 64, and 23.4% who were 65 years of age or older. The median age was 42 years. For every 100 females, there were 87.7 males. For every 100 females age 18 and over, there were 79.4 males.

The median income for a household in the village was $29,013, and the median income for a family was $36,050. Males had a median income of $28,583 versus $22,219 for females. The per capita income for the village was $16,870. About 8.8% of families and 12.0% of the population were below the poverty line, including 12.1% of those under age 18 and 10.6% of those age 65 or over.

== Education ==
It is in the Adirondack Central School District.

== Recreation ==
The NYS Woodsmen's Field Days is held annually, on the third full weekend in August. This event includes forestry exhibits, fireworks, greased pole climb, lumberjack contest, and woods craftsmen. Starts with the Woodsmen's Parade. Contestants travel from as far away as Canada, Australia, and New Zealand to compete in the Lumberjack festivals.

The Woodsmen's Field Days is a nonprofit organization founded by Frank Reed in 1948, designed to celebrate the forestry industry in general. This Field Days has a variety of exhibits and demonstrations targeting both the professional logger and the average firewood cutter. With the help of many interested volunteers the Field Days has evolved into one of the leading lumberjack contest in the United States.

The Boonville Snow Festival held annually in late January consist of vintage snowmobile races, ice sculptures, parade, and fireworks. Local area businesses join in on the Festival of Lights sponsored by the Boonville Chamber of Commerce.
