= Black River Canal =

Canal in New York, United States

Coordinates: 43°27′33″N 75°19′10″W

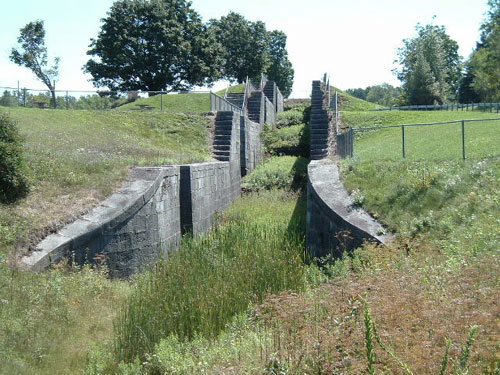
- Abandoned locks on the Black River Canal in Lewis County, New York. A group of locks like this is known as a combine. Locks 87 - 90.

Specifications
- Length: 35 miles (56 km)
- Locks: 109
- Maximum height above sea level: 1,130 ft (340 m) (1 mile SE of Boonville)
- Status: Abandoned

History
- Date of act: 1837
- Construction began: 1837
- Date completed: 1855
- Date closed: 1925

Geography
- Start point: Rome, New York
- End point: Carthage, New York
- Connects to: Erie Canal

The Black River Canal was a canal built in northern New York in the United States to connect the Erie Canal to the Black River. The canal had 109 locks along its 35-mile (56 km) length. Remains of several of the canal's former locks are visible along New York State Route 12 near Boonville.

The Black River Canal Museum in Boonville is dedicated to the Black River Canal.

== Description of the canal ==
In 1828, a survey for the Black River Canal Company proposed 34 miles (55 km) of traffic canal, 11 miles (18 km) of feeder canal, and 40 miles (64 km) of navigable river from Rome in Oneida County to Carthage in Jefferson County to allow the communities of northern New York access to an inexpensive mode of transportation for commerce. Originally the Canal Commission's intent was to complete a route that would terminate at the St. Lawrence River in Ogdensburg at the northern edge of St. Lawrence County. The canal when finished only went to Carthage and yet still possessed all of the traits proposed in 1828 and rose a modest 693 feet (211 m).

One hundred nine locks were required to raise and lower the barges over this relatively short distance. 109 locks were needed because, along the course of the canal, the elevation changes 1073 feet. Some of the locks were in consecutive series of four and five due to steep grades, these locks were known as "combination locks". The summit of the Black River Canal ("BRC") passed through Boonville in Oneida County, where it met with a feeder canal that originated in Forestport. The northern end of the canal proper terminated at Lyons Falls in Lewis County while canal boat traffic continued through to Carthage by way of improvements to the navigability of the Black River itself and the assistance of steamboats. Two additional locks and four dams on the river were needed to accomplish this feat.

== Brief history of construction and partial abandonment ==
Work commenced in 1837 after many years of planning and obtaining legislative support. Testing began in 1848 with the influx of a reduced quantity of water into the system to test for leakage and structural faults. By 1850, part of the canal north of Rome was in service, and the extension to Port Leyden was completed by the end of the year. In 1855, the entire planned length was finished. Damage from a burst dam in 1869 delayed the canal's opening for that year. By 1887 a repair program was instituted to correct damaged locks, worn by years of use. In 1900, the canal north of Boonville was determined to be uneconomic and was subsequently abandoned.

== Legacy of the canal ==
This canal was the longest-surviving of the Erie Canal's feeder canal system, remaining in use in some segments until c. 1920. By 1925, the canal was declared an abandoned waterway. Parts of the canal are still visible, and part of the course was along the current NY Route 12.

The name "headwaters" is still in current use in the Boonville area, referring to the source of the water and the reservoir to feed the canal with water. The Black River Canal Warehouse at Boonville was listed on the National Register of Historic Places in 2003. A museum opened in 2005 operating out of the Warehouse, with other buildings added to house canal artifacts.

== See also ==
- List of canals in New York
