= National Register of Historic Places listings in Madison County, New York =

Location of Madison County in New York

List of the National Register of Historic Places listings in Madison County, New York

This is intended to be a complete list of properties and districts listed on the National Register of Historic Places in Madison County, New York. The locations of National Register properties and districts (at least for all showing latitude and longitude coordinates below) may be seen in a map by clicking on "Map of all coordinates". Three properties are further designated a National Historic Landmarks.

This National Park Service list is complete through NPS recent listings posted September 18, 2026.

Contents: Counties in New York
Albany (Albany) – Allegany – Bronx – Broome – Cattaraugus – Cayuga – Chautauqua – Chemung – Chenango – Clinton – Columbia – Cortland – Delaware – Dutchess (Poughkeepsie, Rhinebeck) – Erie (Buffalo) – Essex – Franklin – Fulton – Genesee – Greene – Hamilton – Herkimer – Jefferson – Kings – Lewis – Livingston – Madison – Monroe (Rochester) – Montgomery – Nassau – New York (Below 14th Street, 14th to 59th Streets, 59th to 110th Streets, Above 110th Street, Islands) – Niagara (Niagara Falls) – Oneida – Onondaga (Syracuse) – Ontario – Orange – Orleans – Oswego – Otsego – Putnam – Queens – Rensselaer – Richmond – Rockland – St. Lawrence – Saratoga – Schenectady – Schoharie – Schuyler – Seneca – Steuben – Suffolk – Sullivan – Tioga – Tompkins – Ulster – Warren – Washington – Wayne – Westchester (Northern, Southern, New Rochelle, Peekskill, Yonkers) – Wyoming – Yates

== Listings county-wide ==
	Name on the Register	Image	Date listed	Location	City or town	Description
1	Abell Farmhouse and Barn		November 2, 1987 (#87001860)	Ballina Rd. 42°54′11″N 75°49′31″W	Cazenovia	
2	Albany Street Historic District	Albany Street Historic District	October 10, 1978 (#78001859)	Irregular pattern along Albany St. 42°55′47″N 75°51′19″W	Cazenovia	
3	Annas Farmhouse	Annas Farmhouse	February 18, 1988 (#87001861)	4812 Ridge Rd. 42°57′25″N 75°51′20″W	Cazenovia	
4	Beckwith Farmhouse		November 2, 1987 (#87001862)	4652 Syracuse Rd. 42°56′51″N 75°53′07″W	Cazenovia	
5	Roswell Beckwith, Sr. House		December 10, 2025 (#100012372)	4622 Syracuse Rd. 42°56′46″N 75°53′08″W	Cazenovia	
6	Brick House	Brick House	February 18, 1988 (#87001863)	3318 Rippleton Rd. 42°54′22″N 75°52′22″W	Cazenovia	
7	Canal Town Museum	Canal Town Museum	May 23, 1986 (#86001292)	122 Canal St. 43°04′47″N 75°45′06″W	Canastota	
8	Canastota Methodist Church	Canastota Methodist Church	May 23, 1986 (#86001293)	Main and New Boston Sts. 43°04′52″N 75°45′19″W	Canastota	
9	Canastota Public Library	Canastota Public Library	May 23, 1986 (#86001294)	102 W. Center St. 43°04′42″N 75°45′20″W	Canastota	
10	Cazenovia Village Historic District	Cazenovia Village Historic District	June 19, 1986 (#86001352)	Roughly bounded by Union, Lincklean and Chenango Sts., and Rippleton Rd. and Foreman St. 42°55′43″N 75°51′24″W	Cazenovia	
11	Cedar Cove	Cedar Cove	July 15, 1991 (#91000867)	W side of E. Lake Rd. 42°57′00″N 75°51′49″W	Cazenovia	
12	Chappell Farmhouse	Chappell Farmhouse	November 2, 1987 (#87001864)	4635 Ridge Rd. 42°56′52″N 75°51′23″W	Cazenovia	
13	Chenango Canal Summit Level	Chenango Canal Summit Level	July 6, 2005 (#05000684)	Along Canal Rd. 42°52′19″N 75°33′33″W	Bouckville	A portion of Chenango Canal
14	Chittenango Landing Dry Dock Complex	Chittenango Landing Dry Dock Complex	April 30, 1992 (#92000458)	Lakeport Rd. at Old Erie Canal; 43°03′36″N 75°52′26″W	Sullivan	
15	Chittenango Pottery	Chittenango Pottery	December 11, 2009 (#09001083)	11-13 Pottery St. 43°03′33″N 75°52′07″W	Chittenango	
16	Cobblestone House	Cobblestone House	November 2, 1987 (#87001865)	Syracuse Rd. 42°56′35″N 75°52′59″W	Cazenovia	
17	Zephnia Comstock Farmhouse		November 2, 1987 (#87001866)	2363 Nelson St. 42°55′30″N 75°50′19″W	Cazenovia	
18	Coolidge Stores Building	Coolidge Stores Building	January 26, 2001 (#00001686)	US 20; 42°53′21″N 75°33′07″W	Bouckville	
19	Cottage Lawn	Cottage Lawn	November 6, 1980 (#80002650)	435 Main St. 43°05′14″N 75°38′50″W	Oneida	
20	Crandall Farm Complex	Crandall Farm Complex	November 2, 1987 (#87001867)	2430 Ballina Rd. 42°53′35″N 75°50′13″W	Cazenovia	
21	DeFerriere House	DeFerriere House	March 1, 2007 (#07000097)	2089 Genesee St. 43°04′26″N 75°41′39″W	Oneida	
22	Earlville Historic District	Earlville Historic District	October 29, 1982 (#82001096)	Fayette, N., S., E., and W. Main Sts. 42°44′25″N 75°32′42″W	Earlville	
23	Evergreen Acres		November 2, 1987 (#87001868)	Syracuse Rd. 42°55′38″N 75°52′38″W	Cazenovia	
24	Fenner Baptist Church	Fenner Baptist Church	January 24, 2002 (#01001501)	3122 Bingley Rd. 42°58′09″N 75°47′17″W	Fenner	
25	First National Bank of Morrisville	First National Bank of Morrisville	September 12, 1985 (#85002365)	Main St. 42°53′56″N 75°38′37″W	Morrisville	
26	Hamilton Village Historic District	Hamilton Village Historic District	September 13, 1984 (#84002494)	Roughly Kendrick Ave., Broad, Payne, Hamilton, Madison, Pleasant and Lewbanon Sts. 42°49′22″N 75°32′33″W	Hamilton	
27	Hillcrest		July 15, 1991 (#91000869)	Ridge Rd. S of Hoffman; 42°56′20″N 75°51′27″W	Cazenovia	
28	House at 107 Stroud Street	House at 107 Stroud Street	May 23, 1986 (#86001302)	107 Stroud St. 43°04′27″N 75°45′41″W	Canastota	
29	House at 115 South Main Street	House at 115 South Main Street	May 23, 1986 (#86001289)	115 S. Main St. 43°04′43″N 75°45′20″W	Canastota	
30	House at 205 North Main Street	House at 205 North Main Street	May 23, 1986 (#86001296)	205 N. Main St. 43°04′53″N 75°45′19″W	Canastota	
31	House at 233 James Street	House at 233 James Street	May 23, 1986 (#86001295)	233 James St. 43°04′31″N 75°45′35″W	Canastota	
32	House at 313 North Main Street	House at 313 North Main Street	May 23, 1986 (#86001298)	313 N. Main St. 43°05′03″N 75°45′18″W	Canastota	
33	House at 326 North Peterboro Street	House at 326 North Peterboro Street	May 23, 1986 (#86001299)	326 N. Peterboro St. 43°05′08″N 75°45′01″W	Canastota	
34	House at 328 North Peterboro Street	House at 328 North Peterboro Street	May 23, 1986 (#86001301)	328 N. Peterboro St. 43°05′09″N 75°45′01″W	Canastota	
35	Lehigh Valley Railroad Depot	Lehigh Valley Railroad Depot	July 15, 1991 (#91000874)	William St. 42°55′58″N 75°50′56″W	Cazenovia	
36	Lenox District No. 4 Schoolhouse	Lenox District No. 4 Schoolhouse	February 23, 1996 (#96000135)	Timmerman Rd. N side, at jct. with Old Co. Rd. 43°02′31″N 75°44′32″W	Clockville	
37	Lorenzo	Lorenzo	February 18, 1971 (#71000541)	Ledyard St. (U.S. 20); 42°55′23″N 75°51′56″W	Cazenovia	
38	Main-Broad-Grove Streets Historic District	Main-Broad-Grove Streets Historic District	September 15, 1983 (#83001705)	Roughly bounded by Main, Broad, E. Grove, W. Grove, Wilbur, Elizabeth, E. Walnut, W. Walnut, and Stone Sts. 43°05′11″N 75°38′47″W	Oneida	
39	The Maples	The Maples	November 2, 1987 (#87001876)	2420 Nelson Rd. 42°55′19″N 75°50′08″W	Cazenovia	
40	Meadows Farm Complex	Meadows Farm Complex	November 2, 1987 (#87001869)	Rippleton Rd. 42°55′01″N 75°51′40″W	Cazenovia	
41	Middle Farmhouse	Middle Farmhouse	November 2, 1987 (#87001870)	4875 W. Lake Rd. 42°57′29″N 75°52′58″W	Cazenovia	
42	Morrisville Engine House	Morrisville Engine House	August 27, 2020 (#100005481)	93 East Main St. 42°53′55″N 75°38′31″W	Morrisville	
43	Morrisville Public Library	Morrisville Public Library	October 5, 2005 (#05001126)	87 East Main St. 42°53′56″N 75°38′35″W	Morrisville	
44	Mount Hope Reservoir		August 29, 1997 (#97000981)	Between Mt. Hope and Fairview Aves. 43°03′34″N 75°38′47″W	Oneida	
45	Nelson Methodist Episcopal Church	Nelson Methodist Episcopal Church	April 17, 2017 (#100000894)	3333 U.S. 20 E. 42°55′02″N 75°46′29″W	Nelson	19th century wooden church
46	Nelson Welsh Congregational Church	Nelson Welsh Congregational Church	August 6, 1993 (#93000681)	Jct. of Welsh Church and Old State Rds. 42°54′07″N 75°45′17″W	Nelson	
47	New York State Barge Canal	New York State Barge Canal	October 15, 2014 (#14000860)	Mainly Oneida Lake; 43°09′51″N 75°48′52″W	Lenox, Sullivan	Successor to Erie Canal approved by state voters in early 20th century to compete with railroads.
48	Niles Farmhouse		November 2, 1987 (#87001871)	Rippleton Rd. 42°54′45″N 75°52′08″W	Cazenovia	
49	Notleymere	Notleymere	July 15, 1991 (#91000868)	4641 E. Lake Rd. 42°56′52″N 75°51′47″W	Cazenovia	
50	Old Biology Hall	Old Biology Hall	September 20, 1973 (#73001199)	Colgate University; 42°49′04″N 75°32′06″W	Hamilton	
51	Old Madison County Courthouse	Old Madison County Courthouse	June 15, 1978 (#78001860)	E. Main St. 42°53′53″N 75°38′30″W	Morrisville	
52	Old Trees		July 15, 1991 (#91000865)	W side of Rippleton Rd. 42°54′59″N 75°52′35″W	Cazenovia	
53	Oneida Armory	Oneida Armory	March 2, 1995 (#95000084)	217 Cedar St. 43°05′36″N 75°39′01″W	Oneida	
54	Oneida Community Limited Administration Building	Oneida Community Limited Administration Building	December 30, 2020 (#100005960)	181 Kenwood Ave. 43°03′44″N 75°36′15″W	Oneida	
55	Oneida Community Mansion House	Oneida Community Mansion House	October 15, 1966 (#66000527)	Sherrill Rd. 43°03′37″N 75°36′19″W	Oneida	
56	Oneida Downtown Commercial Historic District		July 13, 2018 (#100002667)	Broad, Main & Cedar Sts., S of Elm, N of Washington; 43°05′41″N 75°39′06″W	Oneida	
57	Oneida Lake Congregational Church		March 22, 2006 (#06000159)	2508 NY 31; 43°09′28″N 75°49′45″W	Oneida Lake	
58	Ormonde	Ormonde	July 15, 1991 (#91000866)	Between E. Lake Rd. and Ormonde Dr. 42°57′20″N 75°51′41″W	Cazenovia	
59	Parker Farmhouse	Parker Farmhouse	November 2, 1987 (#87001872)	3981 East Rd. 42°54′58″N 75°51′04″W	Cazenovia	
60	Peterboro Land Office	Peterboro Land Office	September 7, 1984 (#84002498)	Peterboro Rd. 42°58′03″N 75°41′14″W	Peterboro	
61	Peterboro Street Elementary School	Peterboro Street Elementary School	May 23, 1986 (#86001304)	220 N. Peterboro St. 43°04′54″N 75°45′00″W	Canastota	
62	The Pine Woods Union Church		September 21, 2026 (#100013264)	6235 US Route 20; 42°53′15″N 75°34′47″W	Eaton	
63	Dorothy Riester House and Studio	Dorothy Riester House and Studio	March 19, 2014 (#14000066)	3883 Stone Quarry Rd. 42°54′43″N 75°50′04″W	Cazenovia	
64	Rippleton Schoolhouse		August 6, 1998 (#98000996)	Rippleton Rd., 15 mi. SE of Syracuse; 42°55′16″N 75°51′46″W	Cazenovia	
65	Judge Nathan S. Roberts House	Judge Nathan S. Roberts House	May 23, 1986 (#86001305)	W. Seneca Ave. 43°04′06″N 75°45′32″W	Canastota	
66	Rolling Ridge Farm	Rolling Ridge Farm	November 2, 1987 (#87001873)	3937 Number Nine Rd. 42°54′46″N 75°50′45″W	Cazenovia	
67	Seventh Day Baptist Church	Seventh Day Baptist Church	October 5, 2005 (#05001136)	Utica St. 42°45′40″N 75°53′07″W	DeRuyter	
68	Shattuck House		July 15, 1991 (#91000873)	W. Lake Rd. 42°58′16″N 75°53′04″W	Cazenovia	
69	Adon Smith House	Adon Smith House	May 2, 1974 (#74001256)	3 Broad St. 42°49′37″N 75°32′36″W	Hamilton	
70	Gerrit Smith Estate	Gerrit Smith Estate	November 24, 1997 (#97001386)	Jct. of Main and Nelson Sts. 42°58′05″N 75°41′13″W	Peterboro	
71	Smithfield Presbyterian Church	Smithfield Presbyterian Church	December 12, 1994 (#94001370)	Pleasant Valley Rd. between Elizabeth and Park Sts. 42°57′56″N 75°41′17″W	Peterboro	
72	South Peterboro Street Commercial Historic District	South Peterboro Street Commercial Historic District	May 23, 1986 (#86001287)	Roughly bounded by NY 76, Diamond St., Penn Central RR tracks, and Commerce Ave. 43°04′41″N 75°45′06″W	Canastota	
73	South Peterboro Street Residential Historic District		May 23, 1986 (#86001288)	S. Peterboro St. between Terrace and Rasbach Sts. 43°04′30″N 75°45′09″W	Canastota	
74	Spirit House	Spirit House	March 22, 2006 (#06000160)	NY 26; 42°40′32″N 75°44′15″W	Georgetown	
75	St. Paul's Church	St. Paul's Church	August 30, 1996 (#96000956)	204 Genesee St. 43°02′37″N 75°52′00″W	Chittenango	
76	Sweetland Farmhouse		November 2, 1987 (#87001874)	Number Nine Rd. 42°54′52″N 75°50′44″W	Cazenovia	
77	Tall Pines		November 2, 1987 (#87001875)	Ridge Rd. 42°57′03″N 75°51′23″W	Cazenovia	
78	The Hickories		July 15, 1991 (#91000870)	47 Forman St. 42°56′04″N 75°51′37″W	Cazenovia	
79	United Church of Canastota	United Church of Canastota	May 23, 1986 (#86001306)	144 W. Center St. 43°04′42″N 75°45′14″W	Canastota	
80	Upenough		July 15, 1991 (#91000871)	Rippleton St. 42°54′12″N 75°52′34″W	Cazenovia	
81	US Post Office-Canastota	US Post Office-Canastota	November 17, 1988 (#88002467)	118 S. Peterboro St. 43°04′43″N 75°45′05″W	Canastota	
82	US Post Office-Hamilton	US Post Office-Hamilton	May 11, 1989 (#88002522)	32 Broad St. 42°49′00″N 75°32′40″W	Hamilton	
83	US Post Office-Oneida	US Post Office-Oneida	May 11, 1989 (#88002390)	133 Farrier Ave. 43°05′39″N 75°39′12″W	Oneida	
84	Wampsville Presbyterian Church	Wampsville Presbyterian Church	February 2, 2018 (#100002075)	109 Genesee St. 43°04′30″N 75°42′20″W	Wampsville	No longer extant per Google Street View and Google Earth. 1830 church, converted from meeting house, was first one in Wampsville; has been altered several times since but retains basic form
85	Wheeler House Complex	Wheeler House Complex	September 22, 1983 (#83001706)	NY 8; 42°48′32″N 75°15′10″W	Leonardsville	
86	York Lodge		July 15, 1991 (#91000872)	4448 E. Lake Rd. 42°56′21″N 75°51′29″W	Cazenovia	

== See also ==
- National Register of Historic Places listings in New York
