= Hillcrest, New York =

Hillcrest, New York may refer to:

Communities

- Hillcrest, Broome County, New York, a residential community
- Hillcrest, Rockland County, New York, a hamlet and census-designated place
- Hillcrest, Queens, a neighborhood in New York City

Buildings

- Hillcrest (Cazenovia, New York), historic home listed on the National Register of Historic Places
- Hillcrest (Lima, New York), historic home
