= Tall Pines =

Tall Pines may refer to:

- Tall Pines (Hattiesburg, Mississippi), listed on the NRHP in Mississippi
- Tall Pines (Cazenovia, New York), listed on the NRHP in New York
- Tall Pines (Bahamas Parliament constituency)

== See also ==
- Tall Pines Motor Inn, listed on the NRHP in Arkansas
- Wayward (miniseries), a Canadian miniseries set in the fictional town of Tall Pines, Vermont
