= Mersen =

French electrical power and advanced materials company

Mersen SA
- Type: Société anonyme
- Traded as: Euronext: MRN; CAC Mid 60
- ISIN: FR0000039620
- Industry: Expert in Electrical Power and Advanced Materials
- Founded: 1891
- Headquarters: La Défense, France
- Area served: Worldwide
- Key people: Luc Themelin (CEO) Olivier Legrain (Chairman) Thomas Baumgartner (Chief Financial Officer)
- Products: Artificial graphite parts; SIC material; Carbon felts; Carbon Brushes; Heat exchangers; Industrial fuses; Bus bars; Cooling devices; Capacitors; Pantograph strips
- Revenue: €923 million (2021)
- Operating income: €102.1 million (2019)▲
- Net income: €58.4 million (2021)
- Number of employees: 6,968 (2021)
- Website: www.mersen.com

Mersen, previously called Carbone Lorraine, is a French international company in electrical power and advanced materials. In 1937, the company was admitted to Bourse de Paris.

== History ==
Mersen, previously named Carbone Lorraine (until May 20, 2010), was created in 1891 by the Compagnie lorraine de charbons pour l’électricité in Pagny-sur-Moselle (Lorraine), where the Group still owns a plant. In 1937, it merged with Le Carbone, a company based in Gennevilliers, (Hauts-de-Seine) where the Group kept and operated the original plant.

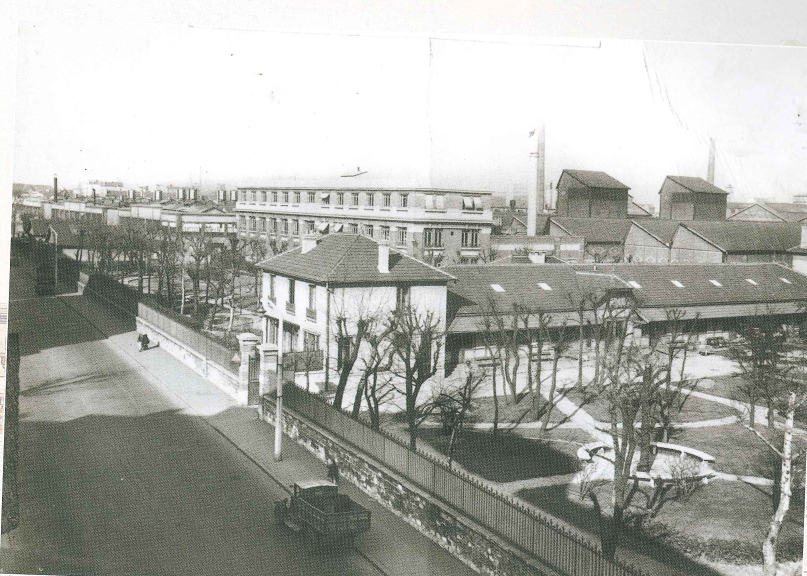
Carbone Lorraine's factory in Gennevilliers

La Compagnie lorraine de charbons pour l’électricité was founded in Meurthe-et-Moselle in1891. It first manufactured motors, dynamos and lighting lamps before producing « carbons » for electric lighting. At the same time, Le Carbone, founded in 1892 in Paris, produced brushes for electric motors. In 1893, Charles Street, an engineer at Le Carbone, discovered and patented the process of carbon graphitization which allowed the manufacture of synthetic graphite. He patented his idea under the title « Continuous electric furnace system »

During the 80s, Groupe Pechiney acquired a majority stake (61 percent) in Carbone Lorraine and financed an expansion and diversification process. The company expanded beyond its core production of graphite brushes, starting to manufacture carbon–carbon disc brakes for racing motorcycles and developing specific components for nuclear and aerospace industries

In addition, it acquired a number of competitors such as Ferraz, one of the biggest manufacturers of fuses and electrical protection systems. Then, it took the control of Stackpole, which led it to become one of the world leaders in graphite production.

In 1995, Pechiney sold 21% of its stake to Paribas Affaires Industrielles (PAI). In the following years, Carbone Lorraine strengthened its position by making acquisitions in Europe and in the United States, in particular in 1999 the acquisition of the Gould-Shawmut Protection Electrique division; enabling it to become a leader in power semiconductor protection. Paribas sold its Carbone Lorraine shares on the market in 2005.

In May 2010, the General Shareholders' Meeting approved the change of name of the group proposed by management. Carbone Lorraine became Mersen. This name is a tribute to Marin Mersenne, a 17th-century mathematician and philosopher, and is also the acronym for Material, Electrical, Research, Sustainable, Energy.

Luc Themelin is Mersen’s Chief Executive Officer since May 11, 2016. He joined Mersen in 1993 as a Research and Development engineer. In 2018, the Group announced having won a contract with Longi, one of the Group’s historical partners in the solar market in China. In 2020, Mersen announced the signature of a long-term agreement with the Marquardt Group. In 2021, Mersen announced the signing of an order worth more than 2 million euros with RongXin Power Electronic. That year, Mersen also announced a strategic technical partnership with Soitec to develop a new family of silicon carbide substrates for the electric vehicle market.

== Acquisitions ==
Date	Society	Expertise/Business
2021	Acquisition of Fusetech	Industrial fuses Specialist
2020	Acquisition of GAB Neumann	Specialist in graphite and silicon carbide heat exchangers
2019	Acquisition of the Columbia site (United States)^{,}	Speciality graphite manufacturing plant
2019	Acquisition of Advanced Graphite Materials Italy	Specialist in graphite and carbon fiber insulation
2018	Acquisition of FTCap	Designer and manufacturer of capacitors
2018	Acquisition of Idealec	Designer and manufacturer of laminated bus bars
2018	Acquisition of the remaining capital of Cirprotec	Specialist in lightning and overvoltage protection
2016	Joint venture, named Hatan Electrical Carbon, with Harbin Electric Carbon in China	Player on the railway market
2015	Acquisition of ASP	Specialists in overvoltage protection
2014	Majority stake in Cirprotec	Specialists in lightning and overvoltage protection (SPD)
2011	Acquisition of Eldre	Specialists in laminated busbars
2010	Purchase of a majority shareholding in Yantaï	Strengthening in solar energy
2010	Acquisition of a majority shareholding in Boostec	Silicon carbide specialist
2008	Acquisition of Calcarb	World n°2 in rigid carbon felts
2008	Acquisition of Xianda and Mingrong Electrical Protection (MEP)	Anticorrosion equipment and Electrical protection and control
2006	Acquisition of R-Theta	Specialists in power electronics
1999	Acquisition of a division of the Gould-Shawmut group	Specialists in electrical protection
1991	Acquisition of Stackpole's assets (United-States)	Electrical and high temperature applications
1985	Acquisition of Ferraz	Manufacturer of industrial fuses

== Activities and markets ==
Mersen provides its products and solutions to many markets like the renewable energies (solar, wind), the semi-conductors, the electric vehicles, or the railways. To this end, the group is structured around two segments. The Advanced Materials segment which develops equipment and technologies for high temperature resistance, protection against corrosion and Electric Power Transfer. The other segment focuses on the Electrical Power with power conversion and equipment and people protection.

=== Global footprint ===
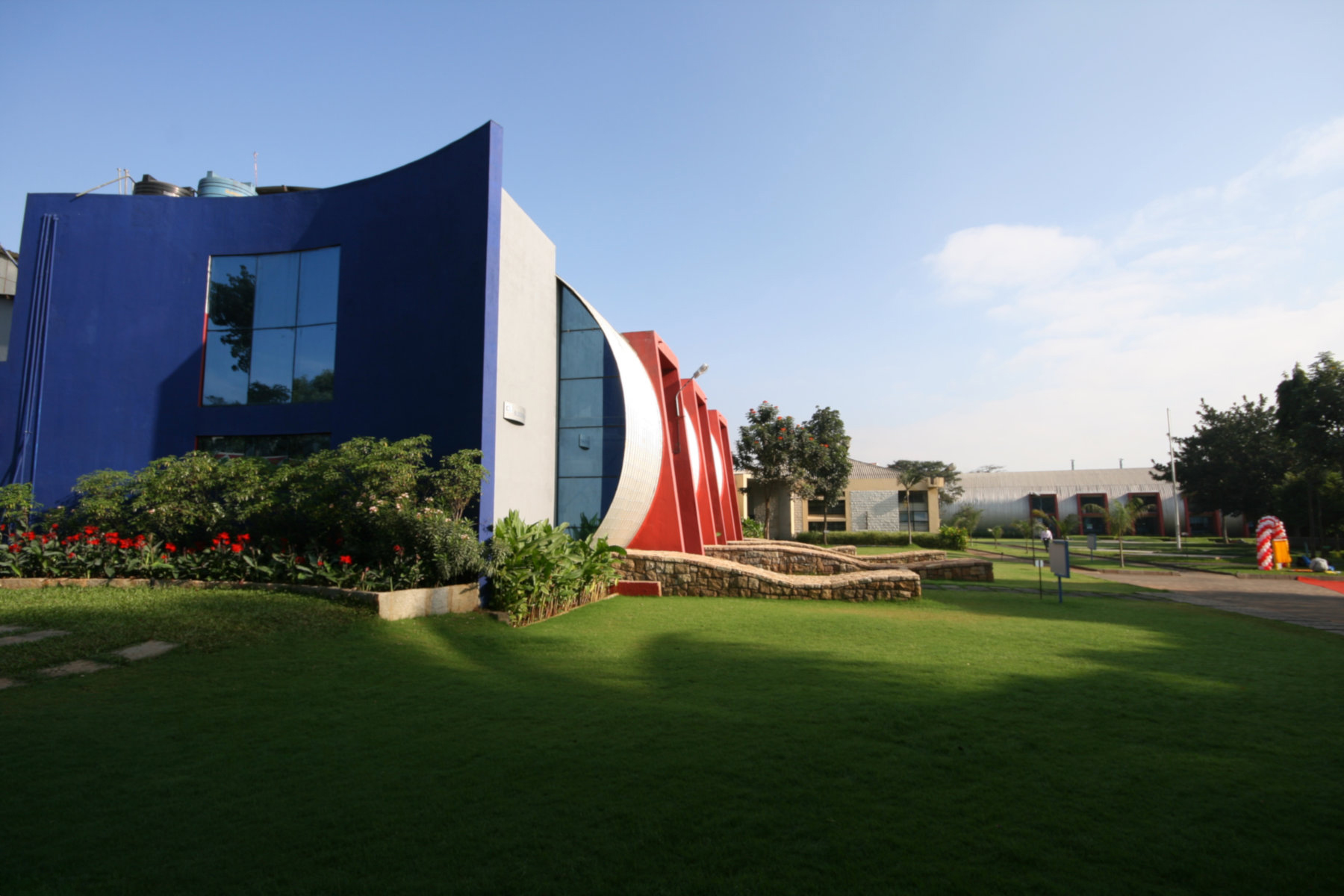
Mersen site in Bommasandra, close to Bangalore, India

Mersen has 53 manufacturing sites in 35 countries on five continents: 22 sites in Europe, 13 in North America and Asia-Pacific and 5 in South America and Africa. The Group has also 18 R&D centers.

The percentage of the 2021 turnover of 923 M€ by region is: 34.5% in Europe, 32.5% in North America, 30% in Asia Pacific, 3% in South America and Africa.

== Shareholder ==
List of major shareholders as of October 30, 2021.

Bpifrance Participations SA / Private Equity	10,8%
Janus Henderson Investors UK Ltd.	4,96%
CDC Croissance SA	4,89%
Invesco Advisers Inc.	4,88%
Norges Bank Investment Management	4,00%
Dimensional Fund Advisors LP	3,01%
Sycomore Asset Management SA	2,97%
The Vanguard Group	1,93%
Canaccord Genuity Wealth Ltd.	1,58%
Oddo BHF Asset Management SAS	1,55%
