= Shattuck House (disambiguation) =

Shattuck House may refer to:

- Shattuck House, Cazenovia, New York - listed on the National Register of Historic Places
- Franklyn C. Shattuck House, Neenah, Wisconsin - listed on the National Register of Historic Places
- Edward D. & Vina Shattuck Beals House, Neenah, Wisconsin - listed on the National Register of Historic Places
