= York Lodge =

York Lodge may refer to:

- York Lodge (Cazenovia, New York)
- York Lodge No. 563, Columbus, Ohio
