= Brick House (Cazenovia, New York) =

Historic house in New York, United States

- U.S. National Register of Historic Places
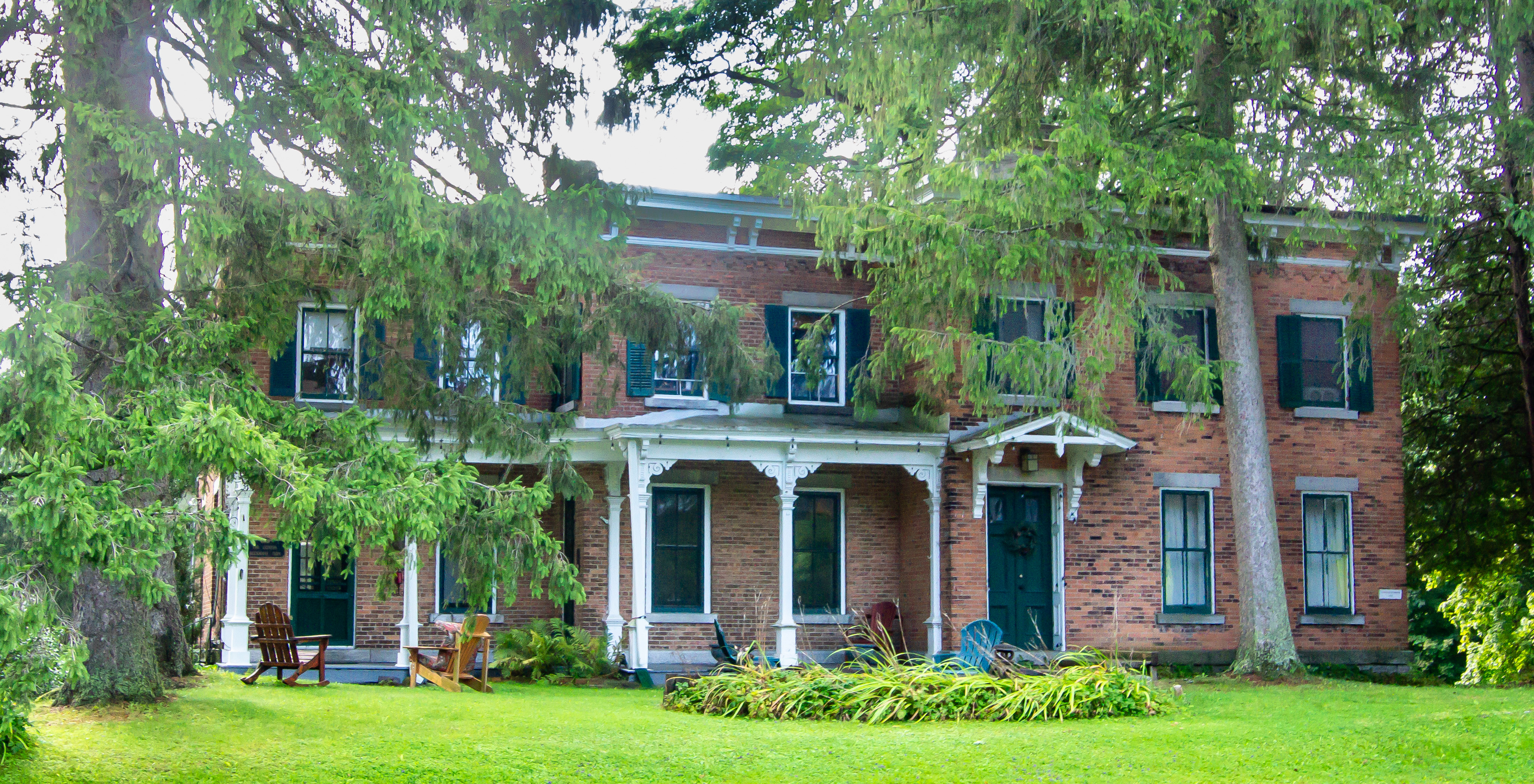

- Location within New York Location within the United States
- Nearest city: Cazenovia, New York
- Coordinates: 42°54′22″N 75°52′22″W
- Area: 3.4 acres (1.4 ha)
- Built: c. 1860s
- Architectural style: Italianate
- MPS: Cazenovia Town MRA
- NRHP reference No.: 87001863
- Added to NRHP: February 18, 1988

The Brick House in Cazenovia, New York was built in 1865. It was listed on the National Register of Historic Places in 1988.

The Brick House is a two-story Italianate farmhouse building.

It is part of the Cazenovia Town Multiple Resource area.
