= Union (hamlet), New York =

Union, New York
- Hamlet
- Location within New York Location within the United States
- Coordinates: 42°52′04″N 75°53′14″W
- Country: United States
- State: New York
- County: Madison
- Town: Cazenovia
- Elevation: 1,257 ft (383 m)
- Time zone: UTC-5 (Eastern (EST))
  - Summer (DST): UTC-4 (EDT)
- ZIP code: 13035
- Area codes: 315 & 680
- GNIS feature ID: 973176

Union is a hamlet in Madison County, New York, United States. The community is about 20 miles (32 km) southwest of Canastota. Delphi Falls is located southwest of Union.
