= Cobblestone House (Cazenovia, New York) =

Historic house in New York, United States

- U.S. National Register of Historic Places
- Location within New York Location within the United States
- Location: Syracuse Rd., Cazenovia, New York
- Coordinates: 42°56′35″N 75°52′59″W
- Area: 4 acres (1.6 ha)
- Built: 1840
- Architectural style: Greek Revival
- MPS: Cazenovia Town MRA
- NRHP reference No.: 87001865
- Added to NRHP: November 2, 1987

Cobblestone House is a historic home located at Cazenovia, New York in Madison County, New York. It is a cobblestone building built in the Greek Revival style about 1840. It consists of a 2-story main block flanked by a 1 1/2-story service wing. It is built of coursed rounded stones set in mortar. Also on the property is a contributing carriage house.

It was listed on the National Register of Historic Places in 1987.
