= House at 328 North Peterboro Street =

Historic house in New York, United States

- U.S. National Register of Historic Places
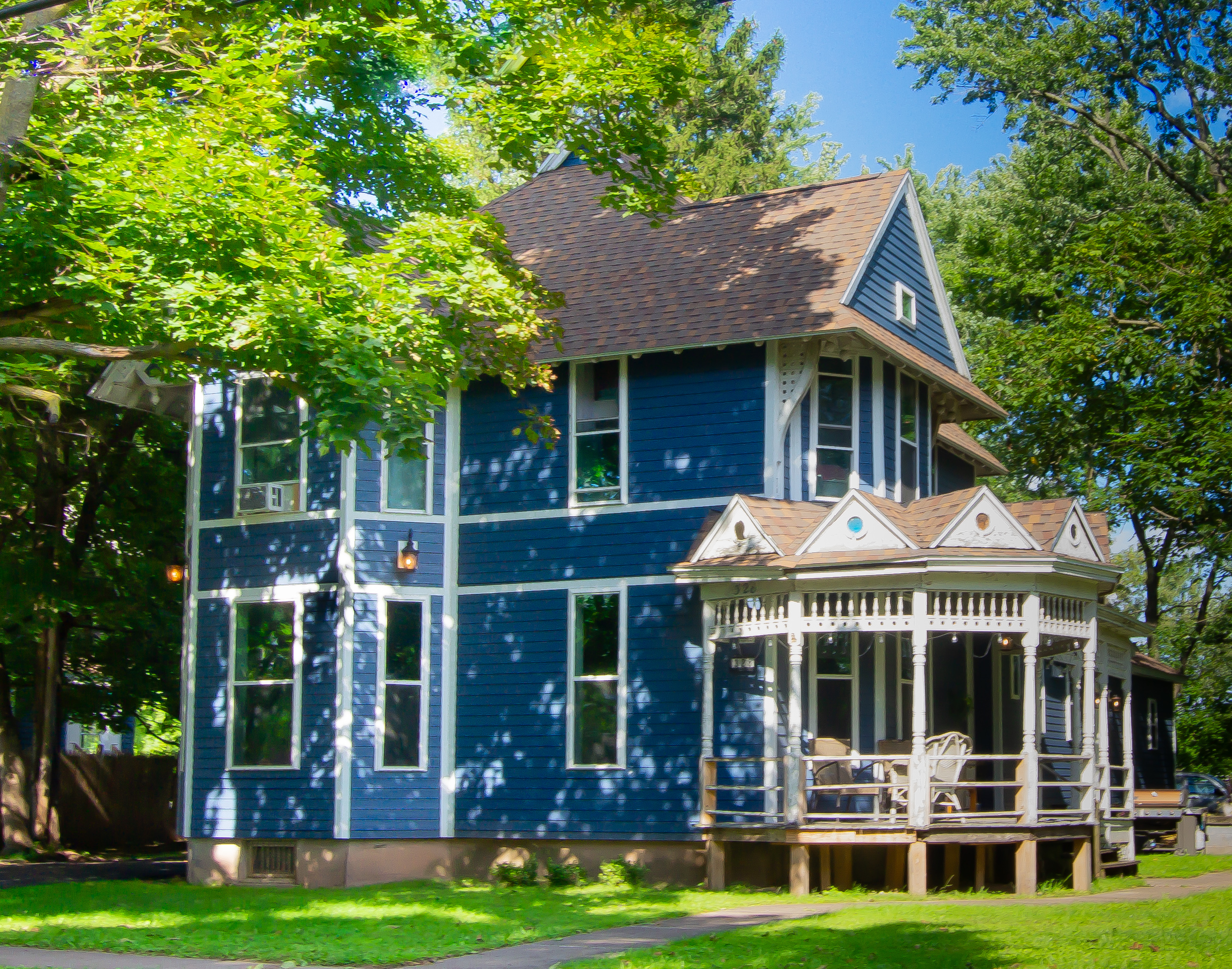

- Location within New York Location within the United States
- Location: 328 N. Peterboro St., Canastota, New York
- Coordinates: 43°5′9″N 75°45′1″W
- Area: less than one acre
- Built: 1852
- Architectural style: Queen Anne, Shingle Style
- MPS: Canastota Village MRA
- NRHP reference No.: 86001301
- Added to NRHP: May 23, 1986

House at 328 North Peterboro Street is a historic home located at Canastota in Madison County, New York, US. It was built in 1852 and is a large, two story frame residence designed with an eclectic representation of the Queen Anne and Eastlake styles. It features an elaborate Eastlake porch with a variety of ornamental woodwork.

It was added to the National Register of Historic Places in 1986.
