= House at 326 North Peterboro Street =

Historic house in New York, United States

- U.S. National Register of Historic Places
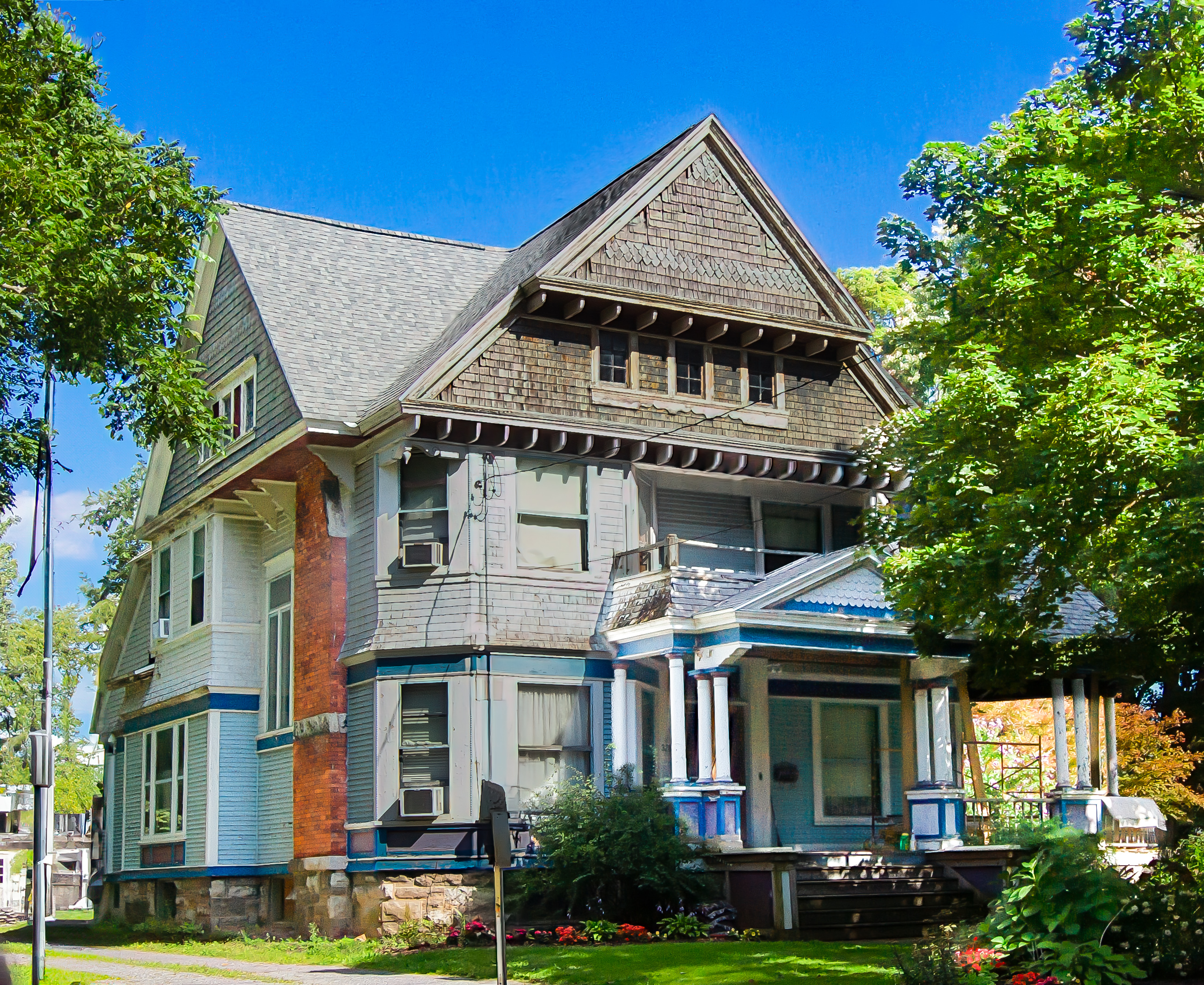

- Location within New York Location within the United States
- Location: 326 N. Peterboro St., Canastota, New York
- Coordinates: 43°5′8″N 75°45′1″W
- Area: less than one acre
- Built: 1890
- Architectural style: Queen Anne
- MPS: Canastota Village MRA
- NRHP reference No.: 86001299
- Added to NRHP: May 23, 1986

House at 326 North Peterboro Street is a historic home located at Canastota in Madison County, New York. It was built about 1890 and is a large, 2 1/2-story frame residence in the Queen Anne style. It features a sweeping verandah with paired Doric order columns and square cut balusters with a large conical roof at the corner.

It was added to the National Register of Historic Places in 1986.
