= Parker Farmhouse (Cazenovia, New York) =

Historic house in New York, United States

- U.S. National Register of Historic Places
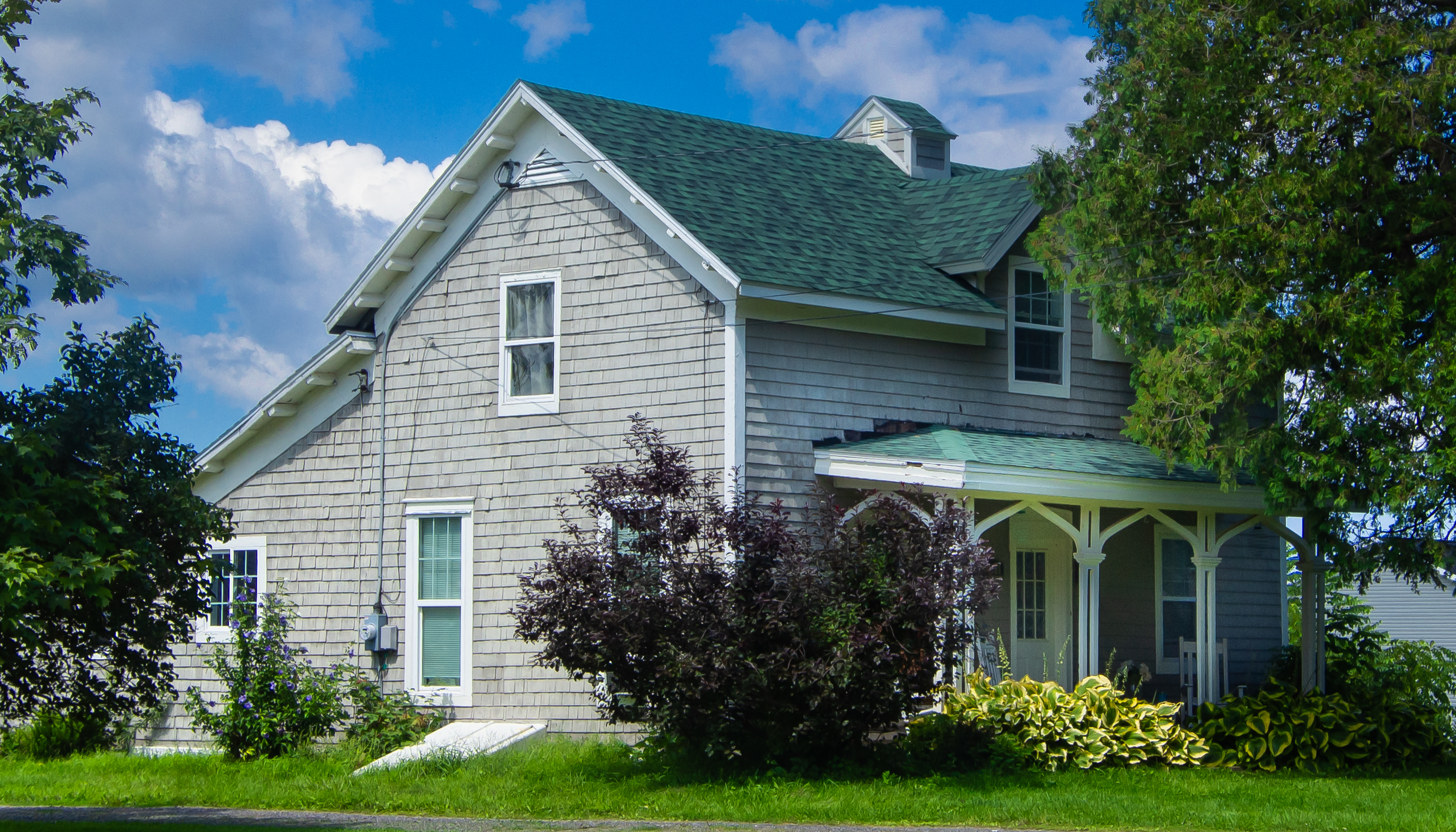

- Location within New York Location within the United States
- Location: 3981 East Rd., Cazenovia, New York
- Coordinates: 42°54′58″N 75°51′4″W
- Area: 44.1 acres (17.8 ha)
- Built: 1820
- Architectural style: Salt-box
- MPS: Cazenovia Town MRA
- NRHP reference No.: 87001872
- Added to NRHP: November 02, 1987

Parker Farmhouse is a historic farmhouse located at Cazenovia in Madison County, New York. It was built about 1820 and is a 1 1/2-story rectangular frame residence in a Saltbox form. It was "modernized" in the 1860s, at which time a front verandah was added. Also on the property are two barns, a wagon shed, and corn crib.

It was added to the National Register of Historic Places in 1987.
