= Middle Farmhouse =

Historic house in New York, United States

- U.S. National Register of Historic Places
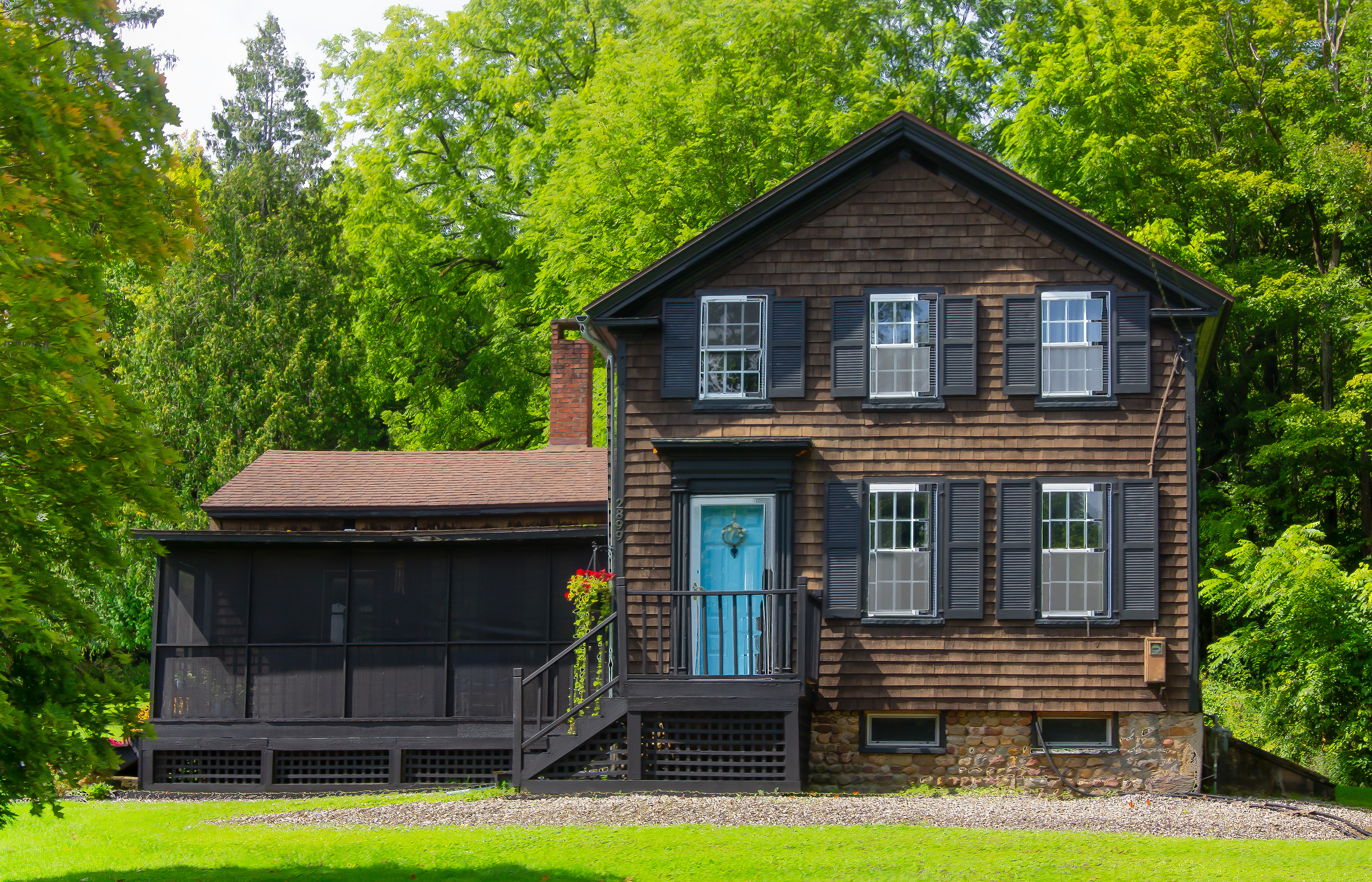

- Location within New York Location within the United States
- Location: 4875 W. Lake Rd., Cazenovia, New York
- Coordinates: 42°57′29″N 75°52′58″W
- Area: 3.7 acres (1.5 ha)
- Built: 1820
- Architectural style: Federal
- MPS: Cazenovia Town MRA
- NRHP reference No.: 87001870
- Added to NRHP: November 2, 1987

Middle Farmhouse is a historic farmhouse located at Cazenovia in Madison County, New York. It was built about 1820 and is a two-story, gable-roofed frame residence in the Federal style. Also on the property is a well.

It was added to the National Register of Historic Places in 1987.
