= House at 313 North Main Street =

Historic house in New York, United States

- U.S. National Register of Historic Places
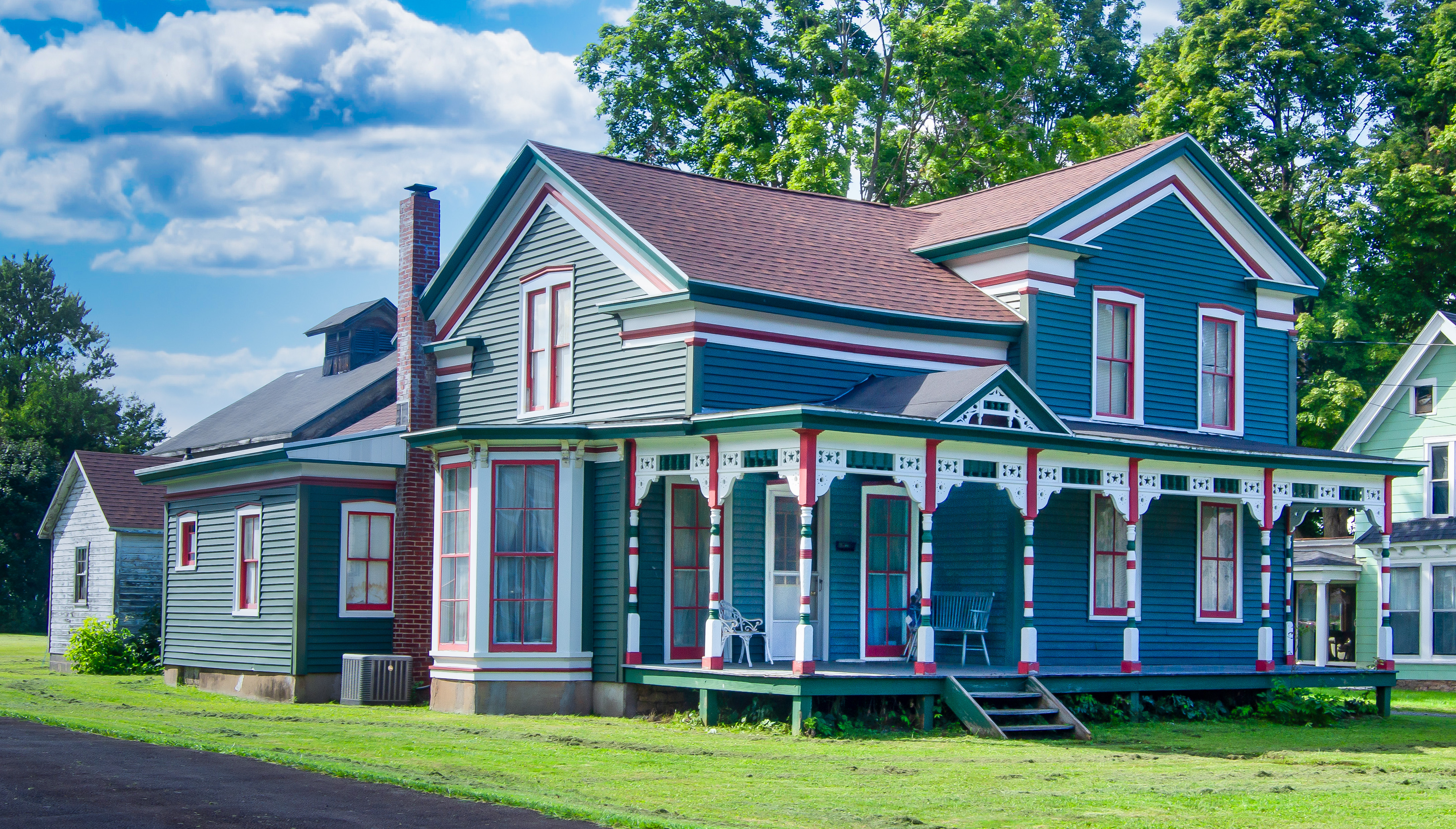

- Location within New York Location within the United States
- Location: 313 N. Main St., Canastota, New York
- Coordinates: 43°5′3″N 75°45′18″W
- Area: less than one acre
- Built: 1840
- Architectural style: Greek Revival
- MPS: Canastota Village MRA
- NRHP reference No.: 86001298
- Added to NRHP: May 23, 1986

House at 313 North Main Street is a historic home located at Canastota in Madison County, New York. It was built about 1840 and remodelled in the 1880s and features Greek Revival-style and Eastlake-style details. It is an L-shaped frame dwelling composed of a 2-story main block and 1 1/2-story service wing.

It was added to the National Register of Historic Places in 1986.
