= South Peterboro Street Residential Historic District =

Historic district in New York, United States

- U.S. National Register of Historic Places
- U.S. Historic district
- Location within New York Location within the United States
- Location: S. Peterboro St. between Terrace and Rasbach Sts., Canastota, New York
- Coordinates: 43°4′30″N 75°45′9″W
- Area: 8 acres (3.2 ha)
- Built: 1850
- Architectural style: Colonial Revival, Greek Revival, Late Victorian
- MPS: Canastota Village MRA
- NRHP reference No.: 86001288
- Added to NRHP: May 23, 1986

The South Peterboro Street Residential Historic District is a national historic district located at Canastota in Madison County, New York. The district contains 44 contributing buildings. It includes residences and churches built between about 1850 and 1930 and executed in a broad range of popular architectural styles.

It was added to the National Register of Historic Places in 1986.
