= House at 233 James Street =

Historic house in New York, United States

- U.S. National Register of Historic Places
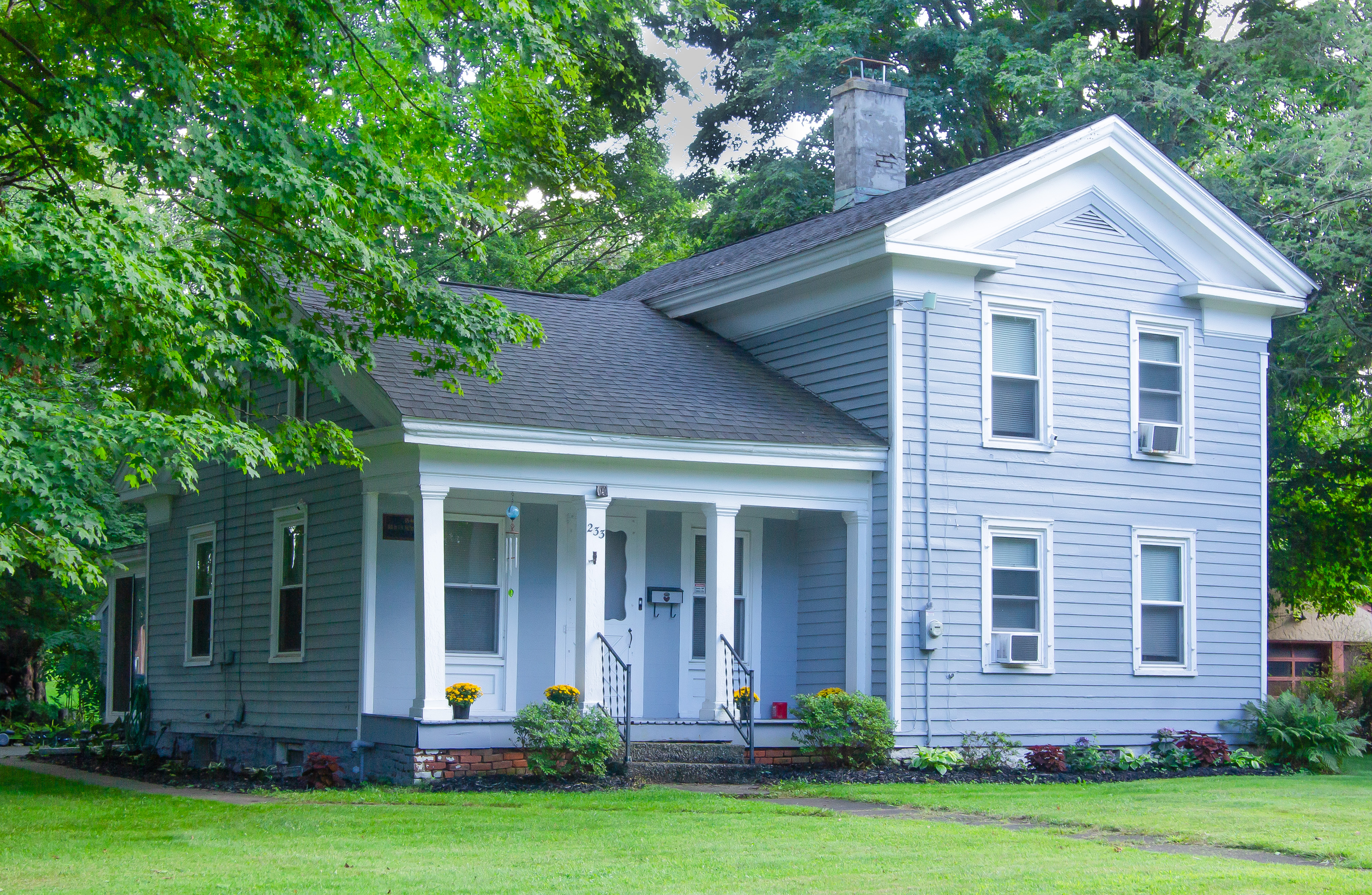

- Location within New York Location within the United States
- Location: 233 James St., Canastota, New York
- Coordinates: 43°4′31″N 75°45′35″W
- Area: less than one acre
- Built: 1846
- Architect: McPherson, J.W.
- Architectural style: Greek Revival
- MPS: Canastota Village MRA
- NRHP reference No.: 86001295
- Added to NRHP: May 23, 1986

House at 233 James Street is a historic home located at Canastota in Madison County, New York. It was built about 1846 and is an L-shaped frame residence with Greek Revival style features. It is composed of a two-story main block with a one-story service wing.

It was added to the National Register of Historic Places in 1986.
