= Cazenovia, New York =

- Town
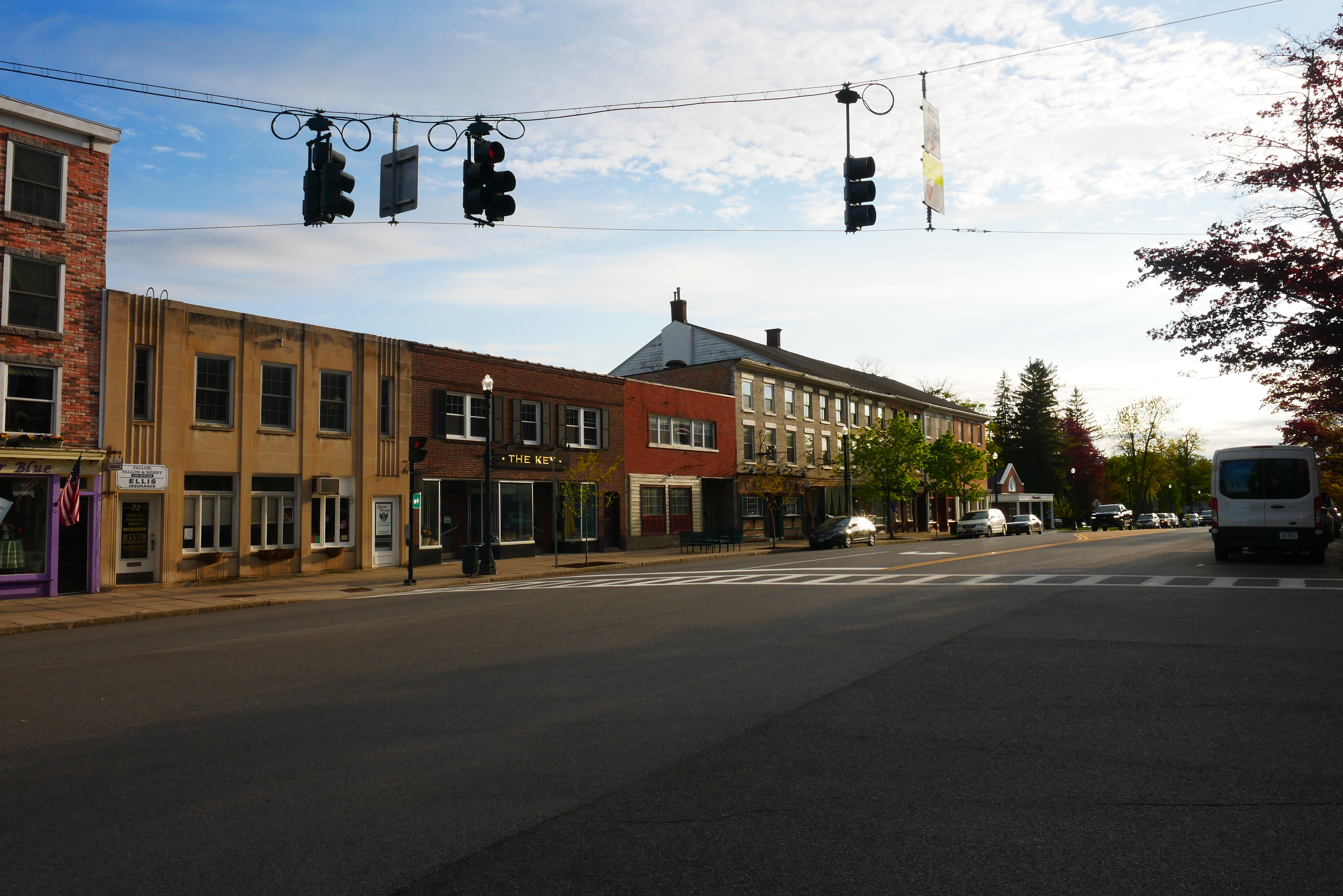
- Downtown Cazenovia

- Location within New York Location within the United States
- Coordinates: 42.9315°N 75.8526°W
- Country: United States
- State: New York
- County: Madison

Government
  - Town supervisor: Kyle Reger (R)
  - Town council: Members: Patrick Race (R); Jimmy Golub (D); Sheila Fallon (R); Kelli Johnson (D)

Area
  - Total: 51.79 sq mi (134.14 km^{2})
  - Land: 49.94 sq mi (129.35 km^{2})
  - Water: 1.85 sq mi (4.79 km^{2})

Population (2020)
  - Total: 6,740
  - Density: 134.96/sq mi (52.11/km^{2})
- Time zone: UTC-5 (EST)
  - Summer (DST): UTC-4 (EDT)
- ZIP Codes: 13035 (Cazenovia); 13122 (New Woodstock); 13104 (Manlius)
- Area codes: 315, 680
- FIPS code: 36-053-13156
- Website: towncazenovia.digitaltowpath.org:10079/content

Cazenovia is an incorporated town in Madison County, New York, United States. The population was 6,740 at the time of the 2020 census. The town is named after Theophile Cazenove, the Agent General of the Holland Land Company. The village of Cazenovia is located in the center of the town. The town is on the county's western border.

The village of Cazenovia was home to Cazenovia College, a small liberal arts college, from 1824 to 2023.

== History ==
Perspective map of Cazenovia with list of landmarks published in 1890 by L.R. Burleigh

The town of Cazenovia was established in 1793 from the towns of Whitestown and Paris (both in Oneida County) before the creation of Madison County. Subsequently, other towns in the county were formed from partitions of its territory. Cazenovia was part of a region called "The Gore", based on a surveying error.

It was founded by John Lincklaen, an agent of the Holland Land Company, and was named after Theophile Cazenove, Lincklaen's supervisor.

== Geography ==
The town is situated along the western edge of Madison County and is bordered to the west by Onondaga County. U.S. Route 20, also known as Albany Street, crosses the town, leading east toward Albany and west toward Auburn.

According to the U.S. Census Bureau, the town of Cazenovia has a total area of 51.79 square miles (134.1 km^{2}), with 49.94 square miles (129.3 km^{2}) of land and 1.85 square miles (4.8 km^{2}) of water (3.57%). Cazenovia Lake is in the north-central part of town. Its outlet, at the south end of the lake in the village of Cazenovia, feeds Chittenango Creek, which descends to the north and flows into Oneida Lake, part of the Oswego River watershed leading to Lake Ontario. The southern part of the town is drained by the East Branch of Limestone Creek, which in turn flows north to join Chittenango Creek in the northern part of Manlius.

== Demographics ==
Historical population
Census	Pop.	Note	%±
1820	3,909		—
1830	4,344		11.1%
1840	4,153		−4.4%
1850	4,812		15.9%
1860	4,343		−9.7%
1870	4,265		−1.8%
1880	4,363		2.3%
1890	4,182		−4.1%
1900	3,830		−8.4%
1910	3,687		−3.7%
1920	3,343		−9.3%
1930	3,504		4.8%
1940	3,424		−2.3%
1950	3,969		15.9%
1960	4,968		25.2%
1970	6,092		22.6%
1980	5,880		−3.5%
1990	6,514		10.8%
2000	6,481		−0.5%
2010	7,086		9.3%
2020	6,740		−4.9%
U.S. Decennial Census

As of the census of 2000, there were 6,481 people, 2,353 households, and 1,658 families residing in the town. The population density was 129.9 inhabitants per square mile (50.2/km^{2}). There were 2,567 housing units at an average density of 51.5 per square mile (19.9/km^{2}). The racial makeup of the town was 97.25% White, 1.10% Black or African American, 0.26% Native American, 0.52% Asian, 0.15% from other races, and 0.69% from two or more races. Hispanic or Latino of any race were 1.48% of the population.

There were 2,353 households, out of which 32.3% had children under the age of 18 living with them, 61.0% were married couples living together, 6.8% had a female householder with no husband present, and 29.5% were non-families. 24.5% of all households were made up of individuals, and 12.3% had someone living alone who was 65 years of age or older. The average household size was 2.51 and the average family size was 3.02.

In the town, the population was spread out, with 24.0% under the age of 18, 12.8% from 18 to 24, 23.5% from 25 to 44, 25.2% from 45 to 64, and 14.5% who were 65 years of age or older. The median age was 39 years. For every 100 females, there were 88.7 males. For every 100 females age 18 and over, there were 83.1 males.

The median income for a household in the town was $57,232, and the median income for a family was $73,590. Males had a median income of $50,556 versus $31,613 for females. The per capita income for the town was $28,957. About 2.4% of families and 4.3% of the population were below the poverty line, including 1.9% of those under age 18 and 6.7% of those age 65 or over.

== Communities and locations in the town of Cazenovia ==
- Abell Corners – A location east of Ballina.
- Ballina – A location south of the village of Cazenovia.
- Cazenovia – A village located on US-20 by Cazenovia Lake.
- Cazenovia Lake – A lake located by the village of Cazenovia.
- Chittenango Falls – A location on the eastern town border, located north of Cazenovia.
- Delphi Falls – A hamlet located west-southwest of Union.
- Delphi Falls – A waterfall located west-southwest of Union.
- Delphi Station – A location north of the hamlet of New Woodstock.
- Juddville – A location south of Abell Corners.
- New Woodstock – A hamlet located south of the village of Cazenovia.
- North Cazenovia – A location north of the village of Cazenovia.
- Perkins Corner – A location southwest of Rippleton on NY-13.
- Rippleton – A hamlet located southwest of the village of Cazenovia, known as "Pig City" in the 1800s.
- Union – A location west of Delphi Station.
- West Woodstock – A location west of New Woodstock.

== National Register of Historic Places ==
The following sites and historic districts are listed on the National Register of Historic Places.

	Name on the Register	Image	Date listed	Location	Neighborhood	Description
1	Abell Farmhouse and Barn		November 2, 1987 (#87001860)	Ballina Rd. 42°54′11″N 75°49′31″W		
2	Annas Farmhouse		February 18, 1988 (#87001861)	4812 Ridge Rd. 42°57′25″N 75°51′20″W		
3	Beckwith Farmhouse		November 2, 1987 (#87001862)	4652 Syracuse Rd. 42°56′51″N 75°53′07″W		
4	Cedar Cove		July 15, 1991 (#91000867)	W side of E. Lake Rd. 42°57′00″N 75°51′49″W		
5	Chappell Farmhouse		November 2, 1987 (#87001864)	Ridge Rd. 42°56′52″N 75°51′23″W		
6	Cobblestone House		November 2, 1987 (#87001865)	Syracuse Rd. 42°56′35″N 75°52′59″W		
7	Zephnia Comstock Farmhouse		November 2, 1987 (#87001866)	2363 Nelson St. 42°55′30″N 75°50′19″W		
8	Crandall Farm Complex		November 2, 1987 (#87001867)	2430 Ballina Rd. 42°53′35″N 75°50′13″W		
9	Evergreen Acres		November 2, 1987 (#87001868)	Syracuse Rd. 42°55′38″N 75°52′38″W		
10	Hillcrest		July 15, 1991 (#91000869)	Ridge Rd. S of Hoffman; 42°56′20″N 75°51′27″W		
11	Lorenzo	Lorenzo	February 18, 1971 (#71000541)	Ledyard St. (U.S. 20); 42°55′23″N 75°51′56″W		
12	The Maples		November 2, 1987 (#87001876)	2420 Nelson Rd. 42°55′19″N 75°50′08″W		
13	Meadows Farm Complex		November 2, 1987 (#87001869)	Rippleton Rd. 42°55′01″N 75°51′40″W		
14	Middle Farmhouse		November 2, 1987 (#87001870)	4875 W. Lake Rd. 42°57′29″N 75°52′58″W		
15	Niles Farmhouse		November 2, 1987 (#87001871)	Rippleton Rd. 42°54′45″N 75°52′08″W		
16	Notleymere		July 15, 1991 (#91000868)	4641 E. Lake Rd. 42°56′52″N 75°51′47″W		
17	Old Trees		July 15, 1991 (#91000865)	W side of Rippleton Rd. 42°54′59″N 75°52′35″W		
18	Ormonde		July 15, 1991 (#91000866)	Between E. Lake Rd. and Ormonde Dr. 42°57′20″N 75°51′41″W		
19	Parker Farmhouse		November 2, 1987 (#87001872)	3981 East Rd. 42°54′58″N 75°51′04″W		
20	Rippleton Schoolhouse		August 6, 1998 (#98000996)	Rippleton Rd., 15 mi. SE of Syracuse; 42°55′16″N 75°51′46″W		
21	Rolling Ridge Farm		November 2, 1987 (#87001873)	3937 Number Nine Rd. 42°54′46″N 75°50′45″W		
22	Shattuck House		July 15, 1991 (#91000873)	W. Lake Rd. 42°58′16″N 75°53′04″W		
23	Sweetland Farmhouse		November 2, 1987 (#87001874)	Number Nine Rd. 42°54′52″N 75°50′44″W		
24	Tall Pines		November 2, 1987 (#87001875)	Ridge Rd. 42°57′03″N 75°51′23″W		
25	The Hickories		July 15, 1991 (#91000870)	47 Forman St. 42°56′04″N 75°51′37″W		
26	Upenough		July 15, 1991 (#91000871)	Rippleton St. 42°54′12″N 75°52′34″W		
27	York Lodge		July 15, 1991 (#91000872)	4448 E. Lake Rd. 42°56′21″N 75°51′29″W		

== Notable people ==
- Edward P. Allis (1824–1889), businessman and unsuccessful candidate for governor of Wisconsin
- Edward Griffin Beckwith (1818–1881), soldier and explorer
- Anne Burrell (1969–2025), chef and TV personality
- Samuel Northrup Castle (1808–1894), missionary in Hawaii; founder of Castle & Cooke
- Sarah Brown Ingersoll Cooper, philanthropist and educator
- John W. Dwinelle (1816–1888), lawyer and politician in California
- Harrison Stiles Fairchild (1820–1901), brigadier general in the Union Army
- Siobhan Fallon (born 1961), actress
- John Lincklaen (1768–1822), Holland Land Company resident agent, founder and developer
- Beezie Madden (born 1963), Olympic equestrian gold medalist
- Lauren McLean, 56th mayor of Boise, Idaho (raised in Cazenovia)
- Charles Stebbins (1789–1873), acting lieutenant governor of New York in 1829
- Steve Suhey (1922–1977), football player at Penn State and in the NFL
- Ezra Greenleaf Weld (1801–1874), photographer and abolitionist

== Economy ==
- Marquardt Group has one of its headquarters in Cazenovia.

== Education ==
Most of the town is in the Cazenovia Central School District. Sections of the town are in Fabius-Pompey Central School District, DeRuyter Central School District, and Chittenango Central School District.

Cazenovia College was in the town.

== See also ==
- Cazenovia Village Historic District
- Chittenango Falls State Park

== Gallery ==
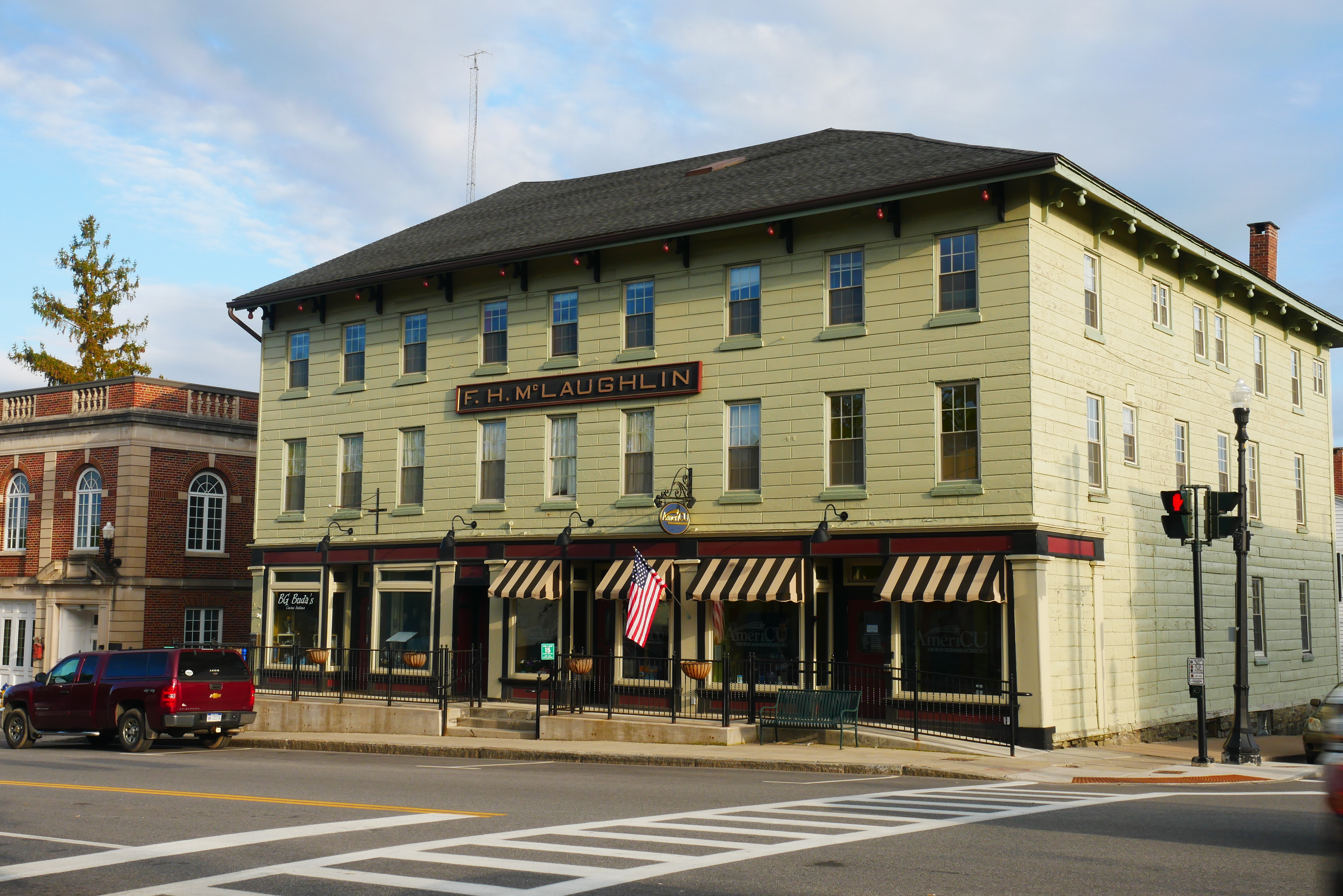
F.H.M. Laughlin building

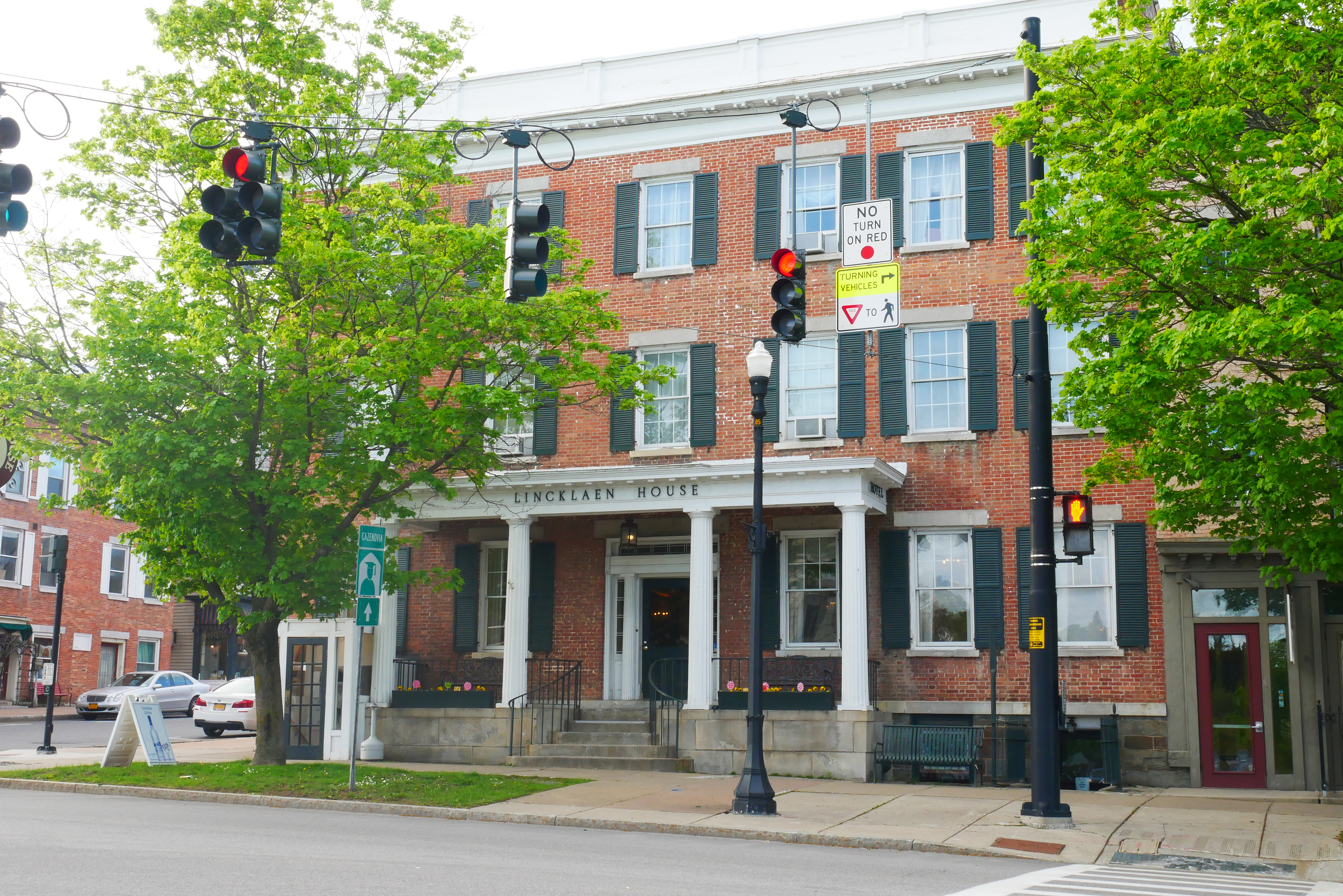
Lincklaen House
