= Beckwith Farmhouse =

Historic house in New York, United States

- U.S. National Register of Historic Places
- Location within New York Location within the United States
- Nearest city: Cazenovia, New York
- Coordinates: 42°56′51″N 75°53′7″W
- Area: 27.5 acres (11.1 ha)
- Built: 1810
- Architectural style: Federal, Vernacular Federal
- MPS: Cazenovia Town MRA
- NRHP reference No.: 87001862
- Added to NRHP: November 2, 1987

The Beckwith Farmhouse was built in 1810. It was listed on the United States National Register of Historic Places in 1987. The listing included three contributing buildings.

It is located approximately 3 miles (4.8 km) to the northwest of Cazenovia Village and is part of the Cazenovia Town Multiple Resource area.
