= Rolling Ridge Farm =

Historic house in New York, United States

- U.S. National Register of Historic Places
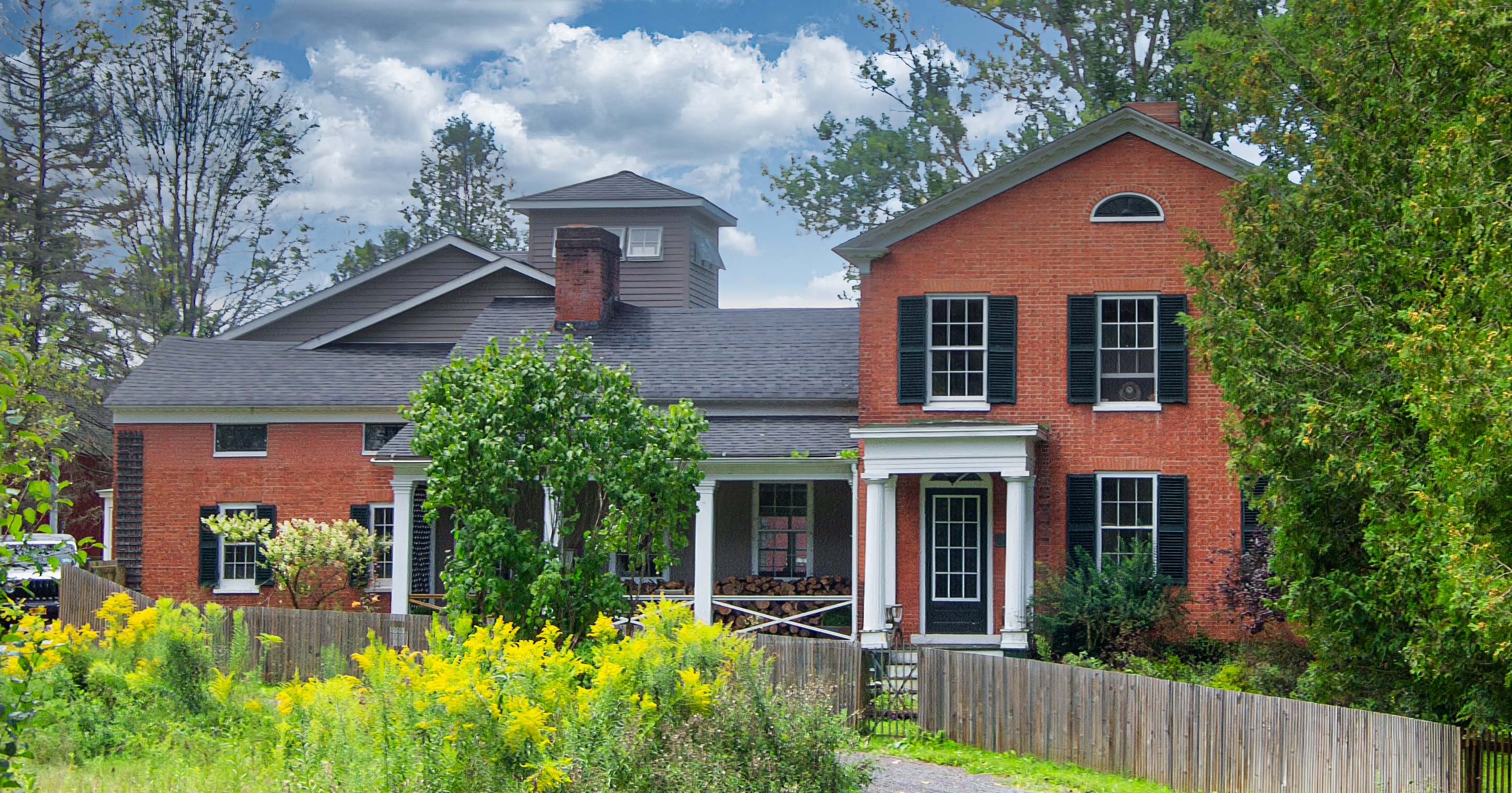

- Location within New York Location within the United States
- Location: 3937 Number Nine Rd., Cazenovia, New York
- Coordinates: 42°54′46″N 75°50′45″W
- Area: 27.7 acres (11.2 ha)
- Built: 1837
- Architectural style: Federal
- MPS: Cazenovia Town MRA
- NRHP reference No.: 87001873
- Added to NRHP: November 02, 1987

Rolling Ridge Farm is a historic home and farm complex located at Cazenovia in Madison County, New York. The farmhouse was built about 1837 and is a two-story, rectangular, brick residence with a gable roof and in the Federal style. Also on the property are two frame barns and a carriage house converted to gallery space.

It was added to the National Register of Historic Places in 1987.
