= Evergreen Acres =

Historic house in New York, United States

- U.S. National Register of Historic Places
- Location within New York Location within the United States
- Location: Syracuse Rd., Cazenovia, New York
- Coordinates: 42°55′38″N 75°52′38″W
- Area: 28.6 acres (11.6 ha)
- Built: ca. 1814
- Architectural style: Federal, Vernacular Federal
- MPS: Cazenovia Town MRA
- NRHP reference No.: 87001868
- Added to NRHP: November 02, 1987

Evergreen Acres is a historic home and farm complex located at Cazenovia in Madison County, New York. The frame farmhouse was built about 1814 in the Federal style and enlarged and altered about 1860. Also on the property are a barn, carriage house, two corn cribs, a silo, and two hen houses.

It was added to the National Register of Historic Places in 1987.
