= The Hickories =

Historic house in New York, United States

- U.S. National Register of Historic Places
- Location within New York Location within the United States
- Location: 47 Forman St., Cazenovia, New York
- Coordinates: 42°56′4″N 75°51′37″W
- Area: 2.4 acres (0.97 ha)
- Built: 1897
- Architect: Potter, Henry H.; Et al.
- Architectural style: Colonial Revival, Shingle Style, Georgian Revival
- MPS: Cazenovia Town MRA
- NRHP reference No.: 91000870
- Added to NRHP: July 15, 1991

The Hickories is a historic home located at Cazenovia in Madison County, New York. It was built in 1897 and is a large summer home built in a combined Shingle Style and Georgian Revival style. It is a roughly rectangular, two-story residence that was built as a summer home for Reverend Townsend Glover Jackson, a Cazenovia minister. It features a central two-story, pedimented projecting portico with paired Ionic order columns. Also on the property is a boathouse.

It was added to the National Register of Historic Places in 1991.
