= House at 205 North Main Street =

Historic house in New York, United States

- U.S. National Register of Historic Places
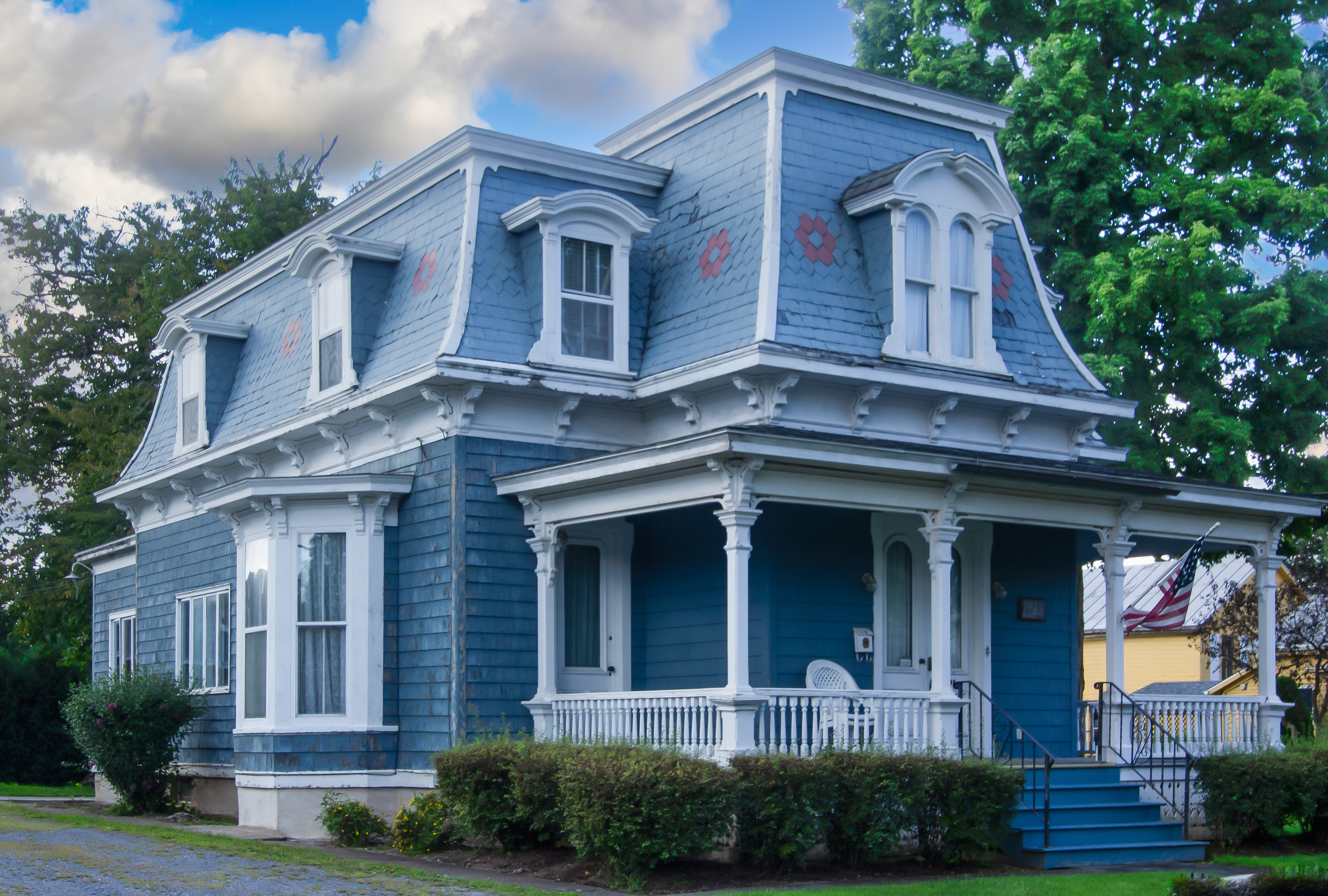

- Location within New York Location within the United States
- Location: 205 N. Main St., Canastota, New York
- Coordinates: 43°4′53″N 75°45′19″W
- Area: less than one acre
- Built: 1870
- Architectural style: Second Empire, Eclectic Second Empire
- MPS: Canastota Village MRA
- NRHP reference No.: 86001296
- Added to NRHP: May 23, 1986

House at 205 North Main Street is a historic home located at Canastota in Madison County, New York. It was built about 1870 in a small scale, eclectic adaptation of the Second Empire style. The one story structure features a multi-gabled, flared mansard roof with polychrome slate shingles.

It was added to the National Register of Historic Places in 1986.
