= Crandall Farm Complex =

Historic house in New York, United States

- U.S. National Register of Historic Places
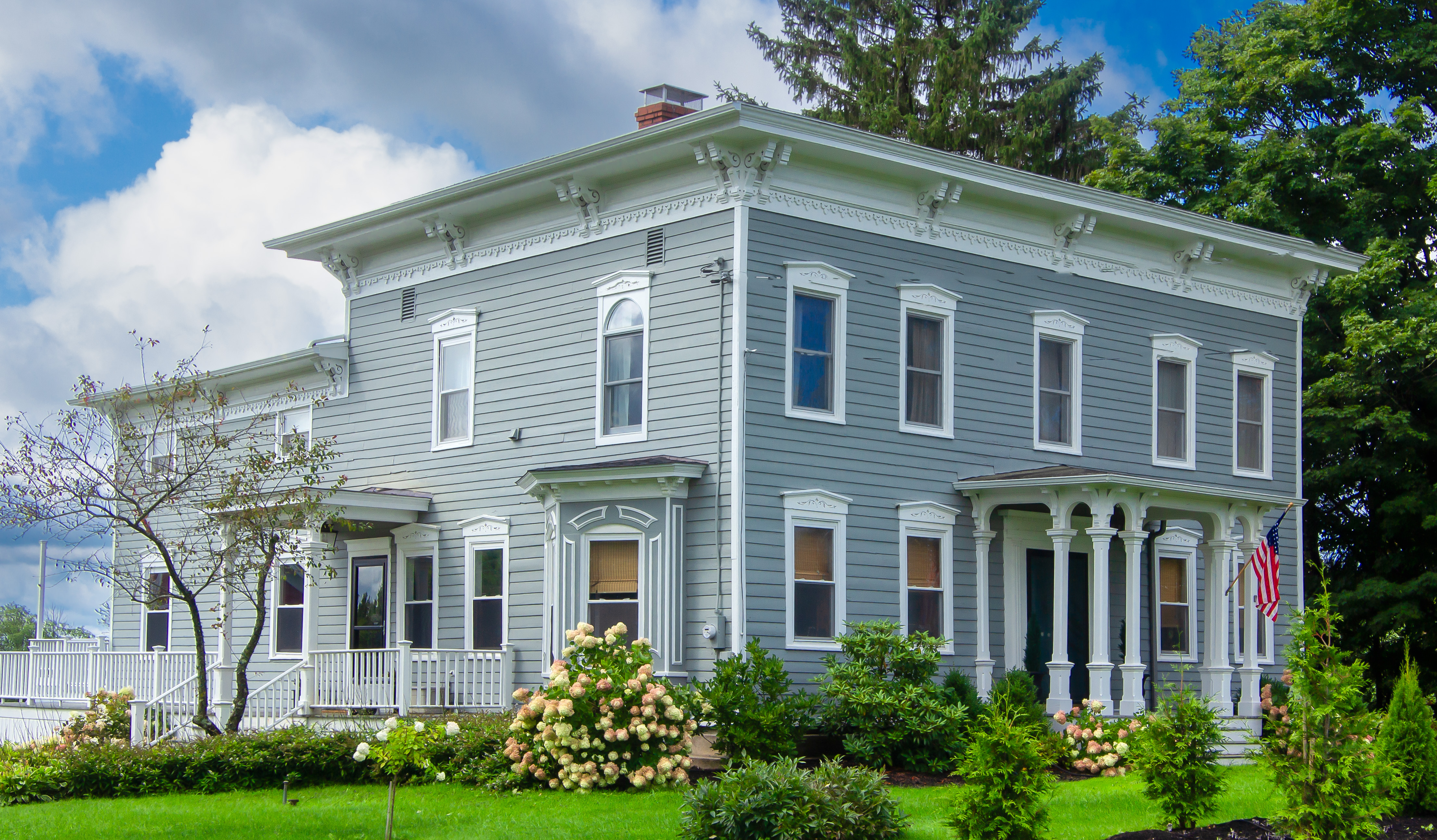

- Location within New York Location within the United States
- Location: 2430 Ballina Rd., Cazenovia, New York
- Coordinates: 42°53′35″N 75°50′13″W
- Area: 124.6 acres (50.4 ha)
- Built: 1870
- Architectural style: Federal, Italianate
- MPS: Cazenovia Town MRA
- NRHP reference No.: 87001867
- Added to NRHP: November 02, 1987

Crandall Farm Complex is a historic home and farm complex located at Cazenovia in Madison County, New York. The frame farmhouse was built about 1870 and is a two-story, frame residence in the vernacular Italianate style. Also on the property are two barns, carriage house, privy, shed, and cobblestone well house.

It was added to the National Register of Historic Places in 1987.
