= The Maples (Cazenovia, New York) =

Historic house in New York, United States

- U.S. National Register of Historic Places
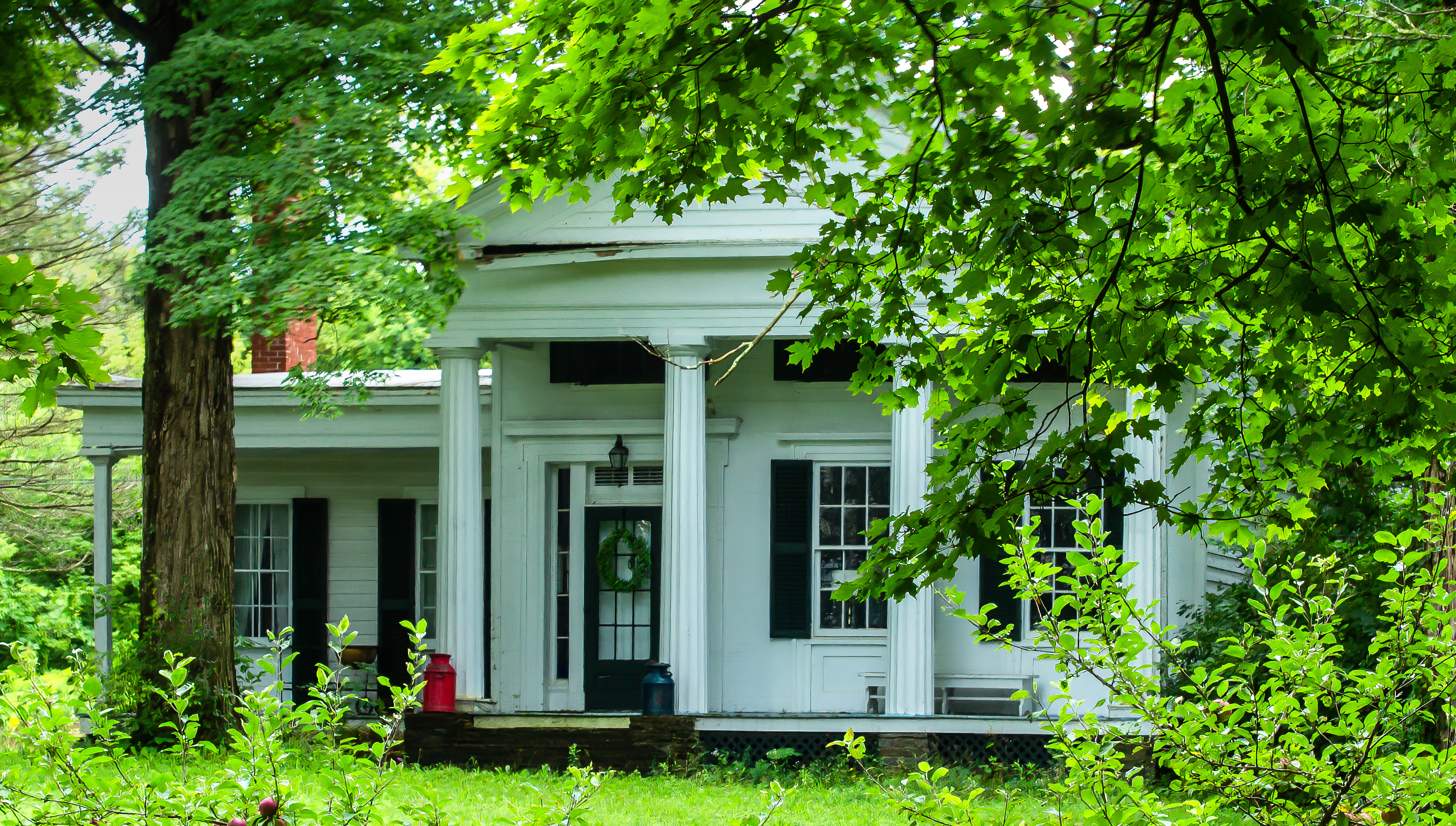

- Location within New York Location within the United States
- Location: 2420 Nelson Rd., Cazenovia, New York
- Coordinates: 42°55′19″N 75°50′8″W
- Area: 24.4 acres (9.9 ha)
- Built: 1835
- Architectural style: Greek Revival
- MPS: Cazenovia Town MRA
- NRHP reference No.: 87001876
- Added to NRHP: November 2, 1987

The Maples is a historic farmstead located at Cazenovia in Madison County, New York. The frame farmhouse was built about 1835 and is a 1 1/2-story, rectangular frame residence in the Greek Revival style. It features a gable roof and monumental classical portico of fluted Doric order columns. Also on the property are two historic barns. New York MPS Maples, The

It was added to the National Register of Historic Places in 1987.
