= Peterboro Street Elementary School =

- U.S. National Register of Historic Places
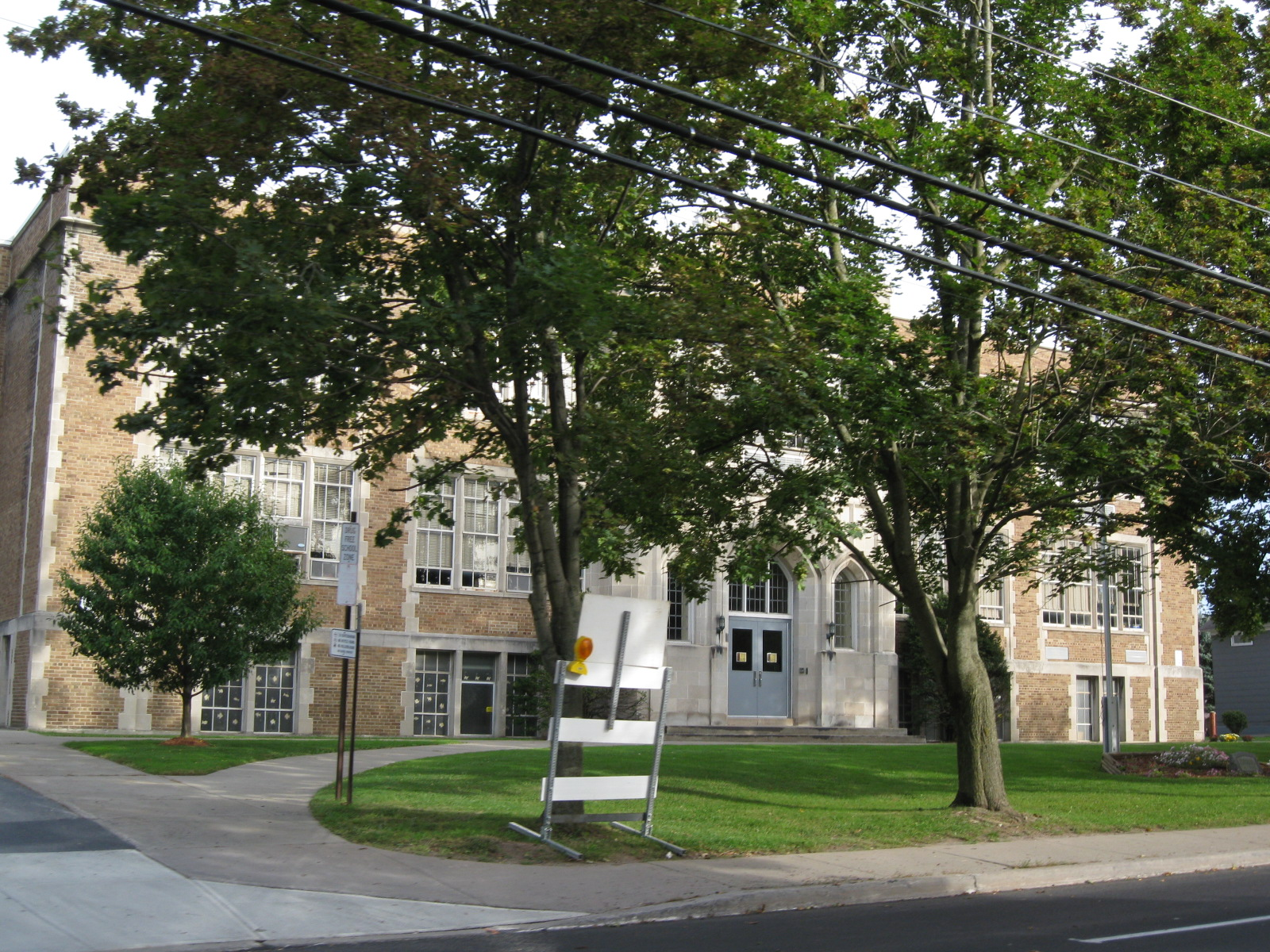
- Peterboro Street Elementary School, September 2009

- Location within New York Location within the United States
- Location: 220 N. Peterboro St., Canastota, New York
- Coordinates: 43°4′54″N 75°45′0″W
- Area: 8 acres (3.2 ha)
- Built: 1927
- Architect: Hallenbeck, Earl; Valentine & Purchase, Inc.
- Architectural style: Late Gothic Revival, Collegiate Gothic
- MPS: Canastota Village MRA
- NRHP reference No.: 86001304
- Added to NRHP: May 23, 1986

Peterboro Street Elementary School is a historic elementary school building located at Canastota in Madison County, New York. It was built in 1927 in the Gothic Revival style. It is a large brick and concrete building whose front facade features a broad, projecting central pavilion flanked by broad, two bay wings.

It was added to the National Register of Historic Places in 1986.
