= House at 115 South Main Street =

Historic house in New York, United States

- U.S. National Register of Historic Places
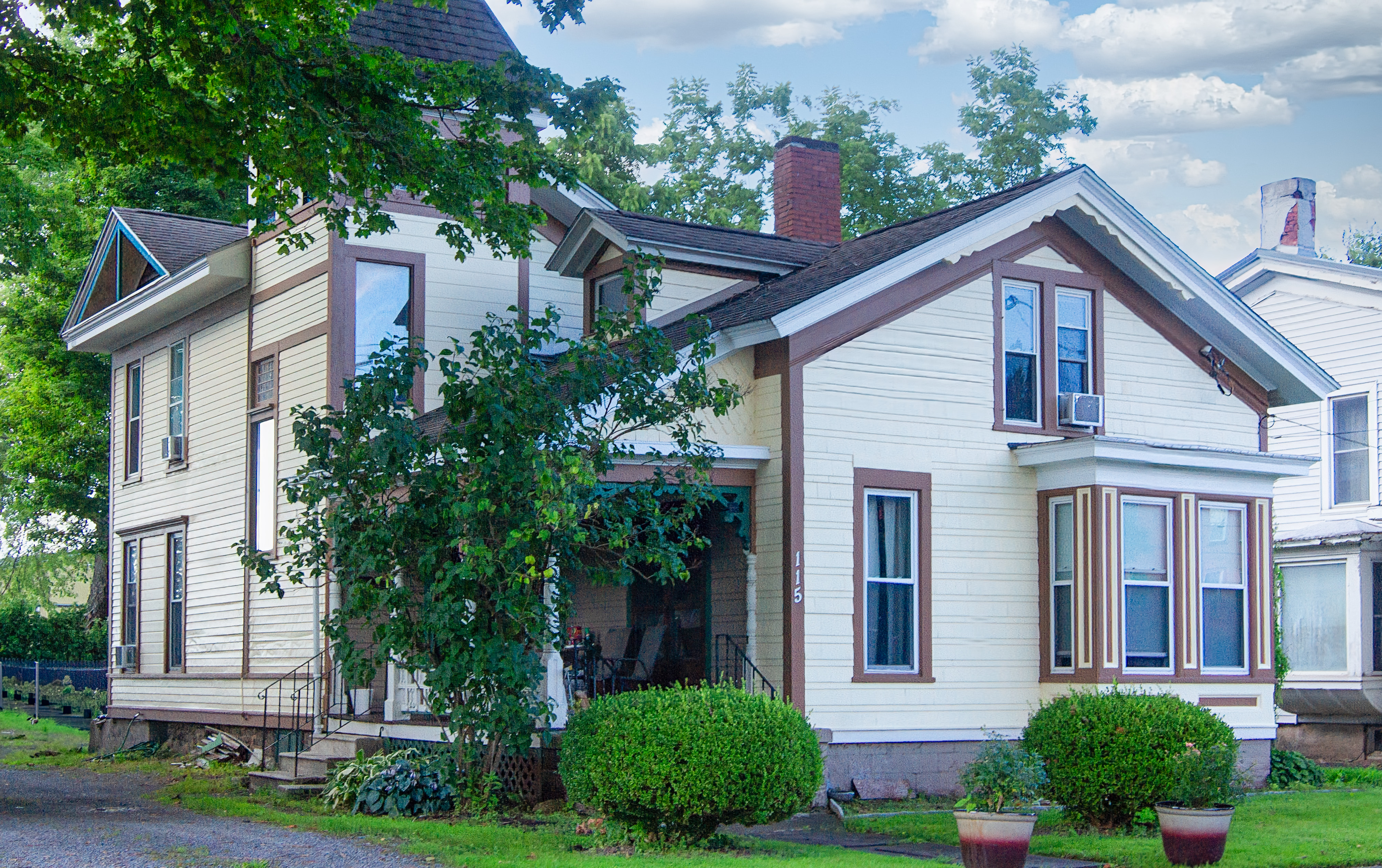

- Location within New York Location within the United States
- Location: 115 S. Main St., Canastota, New York
- Coordinates: 43°4′43″N 75°45′20″W
- Area: less than one acre
- Built: 1855
- Architect: Colton, Clarence
- Architectural style: Late Victorian, Victorican Eclectic
- MPS: Canastota Village MRA
- NRHP reference No.: 86001289
- Added to NRHP: May 23, 1986

House at 115 South Main Street is a historic home located at Canastota in Madison County, New York. It was built in the mid-1850s and remodeled in the 1880s in the Queen Anne and Eastlake styles. It is a modest 1 1/2-story structure surmounted by a multi-gabled roof, which is pierced by a 2 1/2-story tower.

It was added to the National Register of Historic Places in 1986.
