= Marquardt Group =

German switch manufacturing company

Coordinates: 48°02′08″N 8°46′58″E

Marquardt GmbH
- Company type: GmbH
- Industry: Household appliances; Automotive; Mechatronic; Power and energy
- Founded: 1925
- Headquarters: Rietheim-Weilheim, Germany
- Key people: Harald Marquardt (Chairman of the Board & CEO); Björn Twiehaus (Deputy Chairman & Deputy CEO); Jochen Becker (COO); Robert Schutt (CFO)
- Products: Automotive sensors and controls; Power tools; Household appliances; Building services; Cleaning technology; Medical technology
- Revenue: €1.4 billion (2023)
- Number of employees: approximately 10,000 (2023)
- Divisions: Automotive, Mechatronic Devices, Power and Energy Solutions
- Website: www.marquardt.com

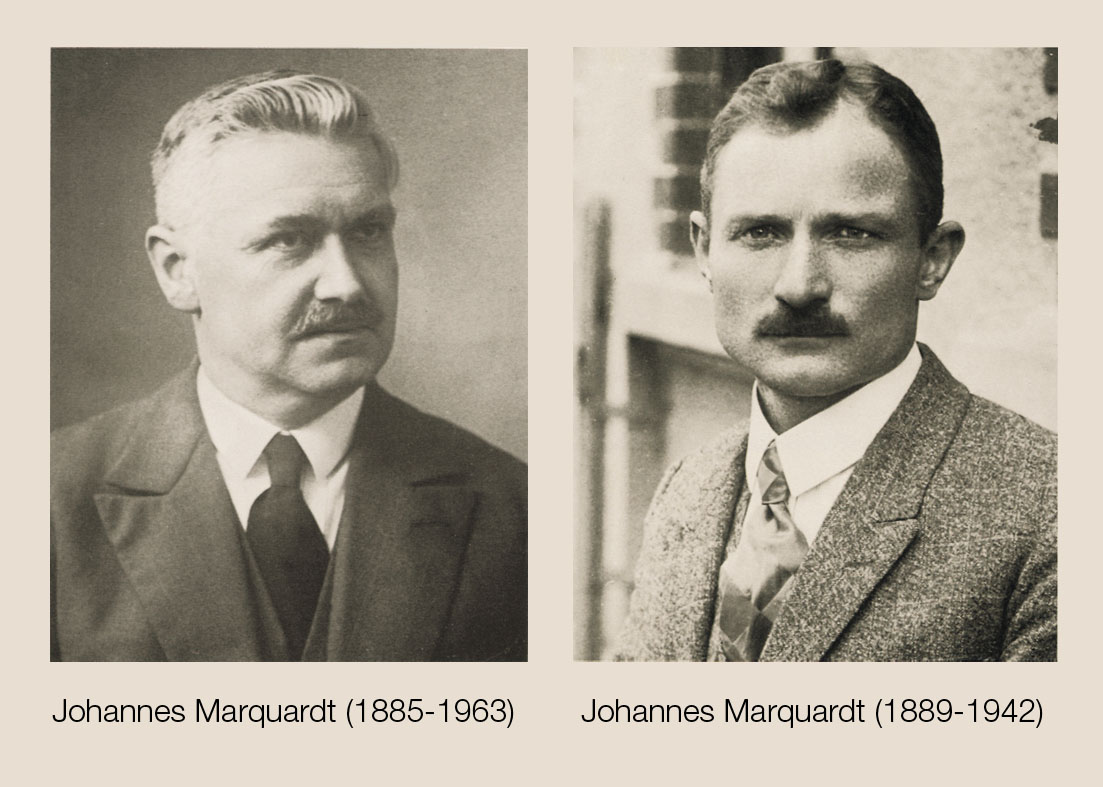
Founders of Marquardt

Marquardt is a manufacturer company of electromechanical and electronic switches and switching systems. Founded in 1925 and based in Rietheim-Weilheim, Germany, the company is family-run.

As of 2023, the Marquardt Group employed approximately 10,000 people in 20 locations across four continents.

== History ==
=== Early years ===
In 1925, businessman Johannes Marquardt (1885–1963) and technician Johannes Marquardt (1889–1942), who share the same name but are only distantly related, established a factory for electrical supplies and precision mechanics in Rietheim.

In the mid-1930s, the company increased its workforce from 60 to 160 employees. During the Second World War, nearly all male employees were drafted into the Wehrmacht; its production was primarily maintained by women in the final years of the war. After the war, all Marquardt offices were initially occupied by the staff of a French commander and were only released after six months. Nearly all machines were dismantled and taken to France. War damage to electrical installations caused supply shortages for plaster-mounted light switches in the French occupation zone and in France.

Marquardt later began producing toggle switches. In 1953, Marquardt began producing snap-action switches. Two years later, in 1955, a new branch plant was constructed in Böttingen, and by 1959, the existing plant at the Rietheim headquarters was expanded.

=== 1965–present ===
In 1968, Marquardt established an electronic laboratory. That same year, the first assemblies were produced in Rietheim. The following year, they built a training workshop in Rietheim. In 1981, Marquardt founded its first foreign subsidiary, Marquardt Switches Inc., in Cazenovia, New York, United States, and constructed a factory there in 1985.

In 1991, Marquardt acquired the device switch manufacturer Russenberger and added subsidiaries in France, Spain, and Tunisia. In 1996, Marquardt founded the subsidiary Marquardt Switches Shanghai in China, forming a joint venture with the Indian switch manufacturer RG Keswani.

In 2012, the company founded the subsidiary E&C Testlab GmbH in Trossingen, which specializes in measuring electromagnetic compatibility (EMC).

== Units ==
The Automotive business unit develops drive authorisation systems (such as drive authorisation via smartphone, electronic keys, and electronic ignition start switches), operating components (such as seat adjustment switches and rotary light switches), and ultra-wideband communication. In May 2024, Marquardt showcased its battery management systems, sensors for hydrogen fuel cells, and components for digital vehicle communication. The company presented it to Bluetooth Low Energy and Ultra-Wideband technology positioning.

The Mechatronic Devices business unit develops switching systems for systems and switches.

The Power and Energy Solutions business unit has been around since 2021 and develops battery management systems from twelve to 800 volts, charging and converter systems for battery electric vehicles, as well as electromechanical components for fuel cell vehicles.

== Locations ==
The Marquardt Group operates at a total of 20 locations in 14 countries on four continents: Europe, Asia, North America, and Africa.

== Key personnel ==
Marquardt Group's key personnel
Name	Position	Ref.
Harald Marquardt	Chairman & CEO	
Björn Twiehaus	Deputy Chairman & Deputy CEO	
Jochen Becker	Chief Operating Officer	
Robert Schutt	Chief Financial Officer	
Kristjan Ambroz	Chief Officer Mechatronic Devices	
