= Meadows Farm Complex =

Historic house in New York, United States

- U.S. National Register of Historic Places
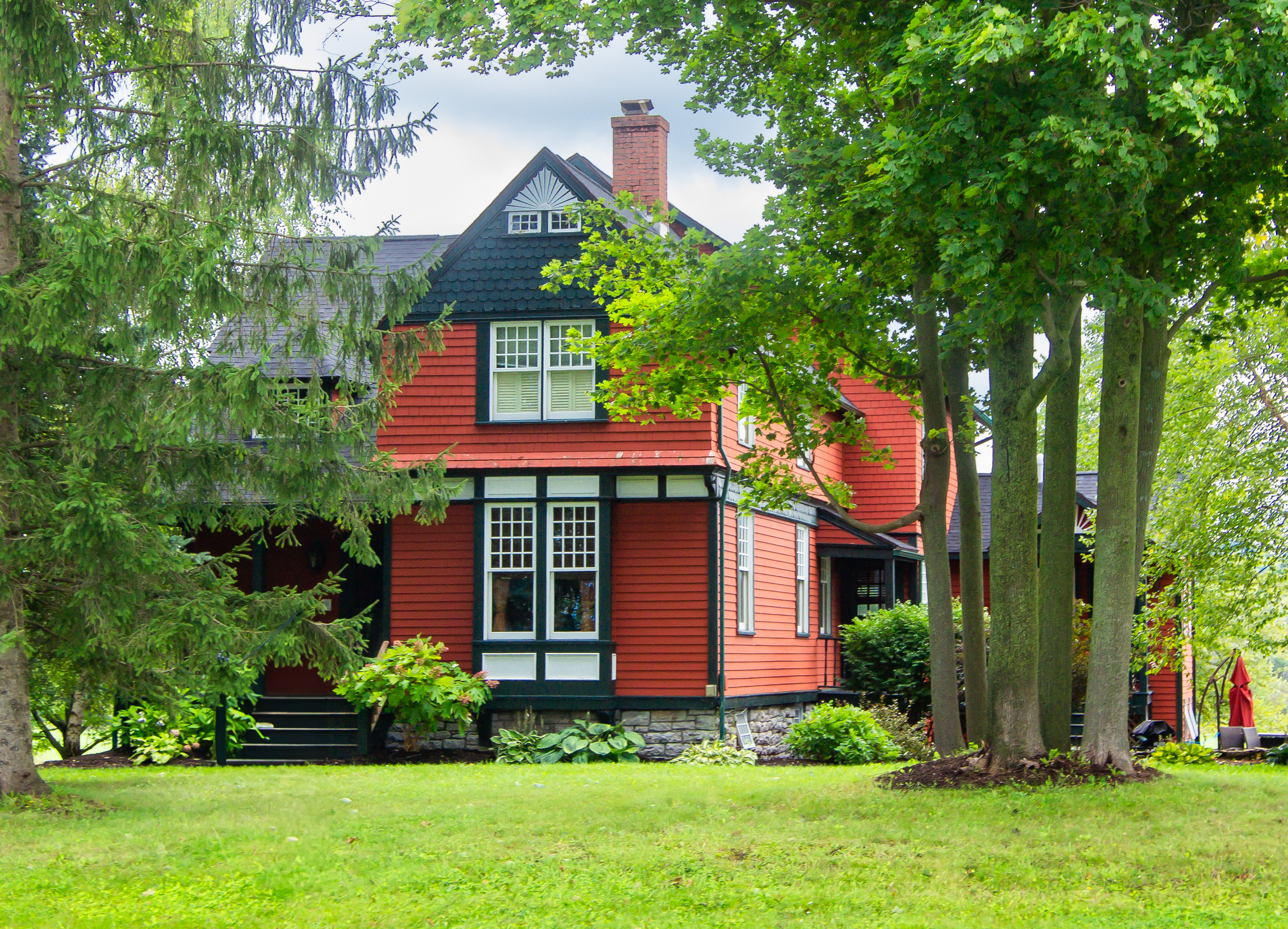

- Location within New York Location within the United States
- Location: Rippleton Rd., Cazenovia, New York
- Coordinates: 42°55′1″N 75°51′40″W
- Area: 94.4 acres (38.2 ha)
- Built: 1815
- Architectural style: Queen Anne, Federal, Vernacular Federal
- MPS: Cazenovia Town MRA
- NRHP reference No.: 87001869
- Added to NRHP: November 2, 1987

Meadows Farm Complex is a historic home and farm complex located at Cazenovia in Madison County, New York. The Meadows farmhouse was built about 1900 and is a 1 1/2-story, L-shaped frame residence with restrained Queen Anne–style detailing. The Meadows guesthouse was built about 1815 in a rural vernacular Federal style. Also on the property are two barns, shed, smokehouse, well, and machine shed.

It was added to the National Register of Historic Places in 1987.
