= Annas Farmhouse =

Historic house in New York, United States

- U.S. National Register of Historic Places
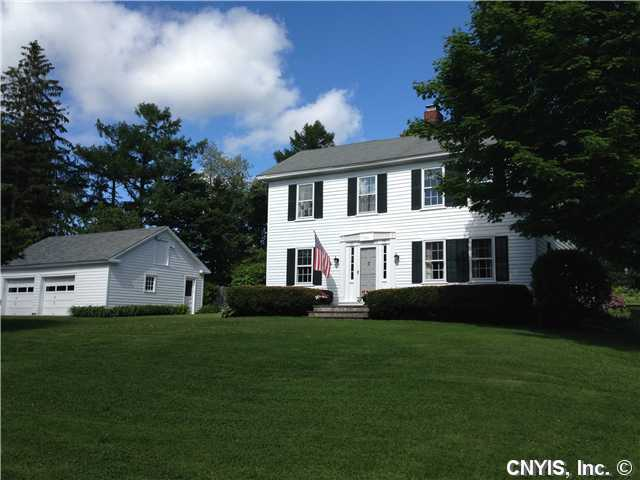

- Location within New York Location within the United States
- Nearest city: Cazenovia, New York
- Coordinates: 42°57′25″N 75°51′20″W
- Area: 1.5 acres (0.61 ha)
- Built: 1832
- Architectural style: Federal, Greek Revival
- MPS: Cazenovia Town MRA
- NRHP reference No.: 87001861
- Added to NRHP: February 18, 1988

The Annas Farmhouse is a historic farmhouse built in 1832. It was listed on the National Register of Historic Places in 1988.

It has a late Federal style/early Greek Revival style entrance way.

It is part of the Cazenovia Town Multiple Resource area.
