= Abell Farmhouse and Barn =

Historic house in New York, United States

- U.S. National Register of Historic Places
- Location within New York Location within the United States
- Nearest city: Cazenovia, New York
- Coordinates: 42°54′11″N 75°49′31″W
- Area: 95.4 acres (38.6 ha)
- Built: 1870
- Architectural style: Italianate, Stick/Eastlake, Queen Anne
- MPS: Cazenovia Town MRA
- NRHP reference No.: 87001860
- Added to NRHP: November 2, 1987

The Abell Farmhouse and Barn was built in 1870. It was listed on the National Register of Historic Places in 1987.

The Abell Farmhouse was an Italianate building.

It is part of the Cazenovia Town Multiple Resource Area.

In July 2021, the Farmhouse burned down in an overnight fire.
