= House at 107 Stroud Street =

Historic house in New York, United States

- U.S. National Register of Historic Places
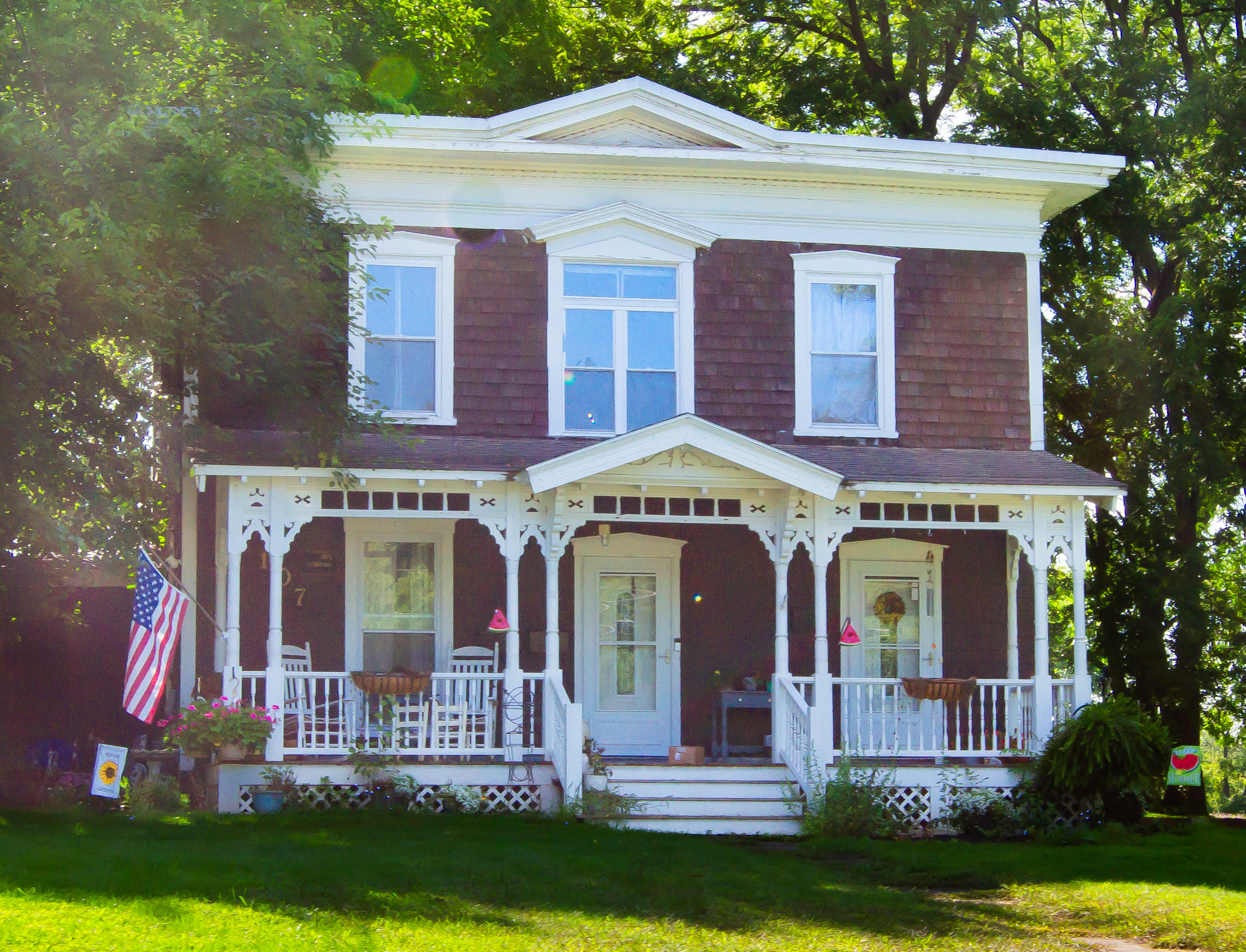

- Location within New York Location within the United States
- Location: 107 Stroud St., Canastota, New York
- Coordinates: 43°4′27″N 75°45′41″W
- Area: less than one acre
- Built: 1875
- Architectural style: Italianate
- MPS: Canastota Village MRA
- NRHP reference No.: 86001302
- Added to NRHP: May 23, 1986

House at 107 Stroud Street is a historic home located at Canastota in Madison County, New York. It was built about 1875 and displays elements of the Italianate and Eastlake styles. It is a two-story cubic massed structure surmounted by a low-pitched, hipped roof with a central cross gable.

It was added to the National Register of Historic Places in 1986.
