= Chappell Farmhouse =

Historic house in New York, United States

- U.S. National Register of Historic Places
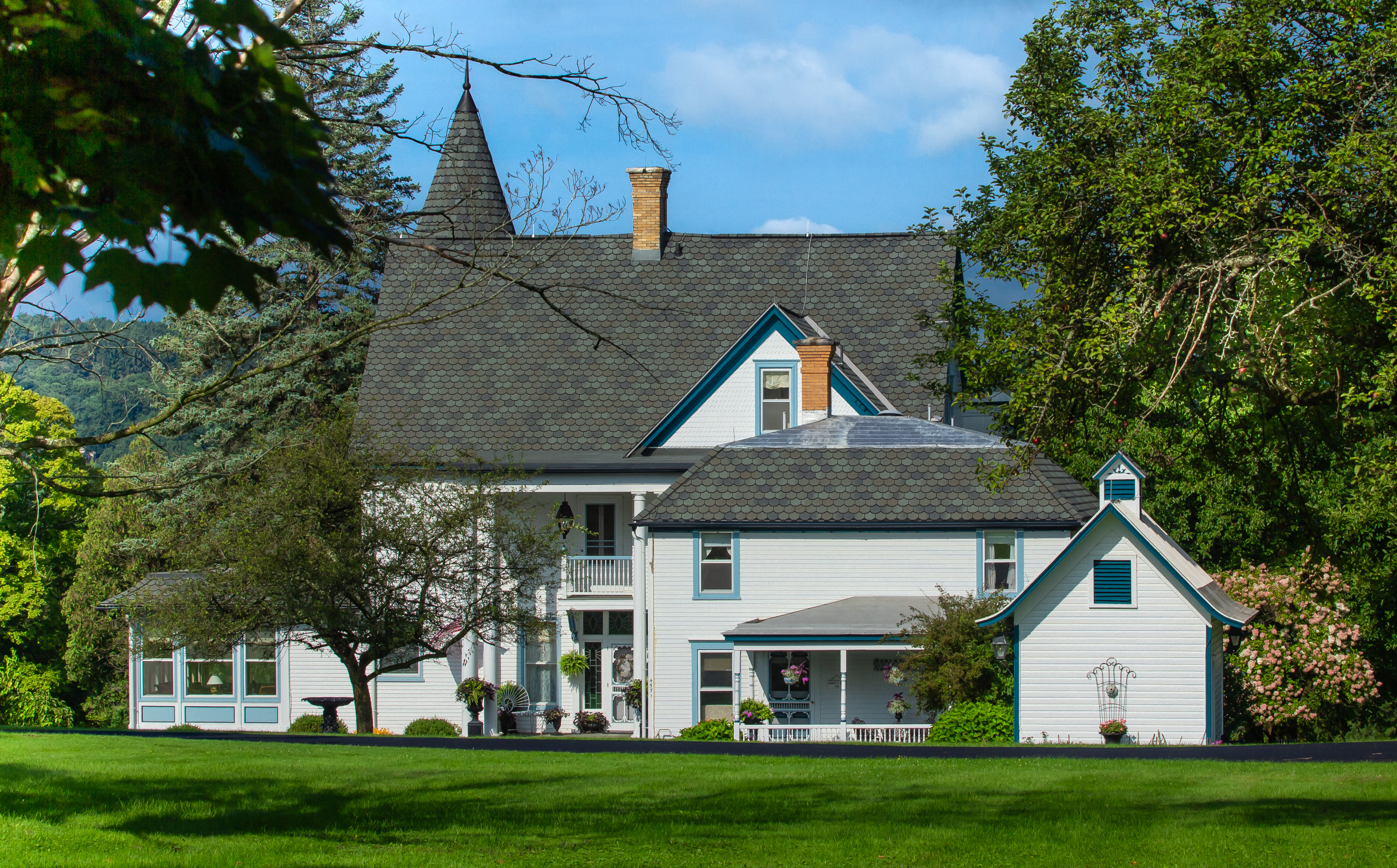

- Location within New York Location within the United States
- Nearest city: Cazenovia, New York
- Coordinates: 42°56′52″N 75°51′23″W
- Area: 2.2 acres (0.89 ha)
- Built: 1835
- Architectural style: Federal, Greek Revival
- MPS: Cazenovia Town MRA
- NRHP reference No.: 87001864
- Added to NRHP: November 2, 1987

The Chappell Farmhouse is a historic house in New York, United States. It was built in 1835 and was listed on the National Register of Historic Places in 1987. The farmhouse shows late Federal style/early Greek Revival style architecture.

It is part of the Cazenovia Town Multiple Resource Area.
