= Sweetland Farmhouse =

Historic house in New York, United States

- U.S. National Register of Historic Places
- Location within New York Location within the United States
- Location: Number Nine Rd., Cazenovia, New York
- Coordinates: 42°54′52″N 75°50′44″W
- Area: 1.9 acres (0.77 ha)
- Built: 1825
- Architectural style: Federal
- MPS: Cazenovia Town MRA
- NRHP reference No.: 87001874
- Added to NRHP: November 02, 1987

Sweetland Farmhouse is a historic farmhouse located at Cazenovia in Madison County, New York. It was built about 1825 and is a 1 1/2-story, rectangular, frame residence with a gable roof and in the Federal style. Also on the property is a garage, shed, and chicken house.

It was added to the National Register of Historic Places in 1987.
