= Canastota Methodist Church =

Historic church in New York, United States

- U.S. National Register of Historic Places
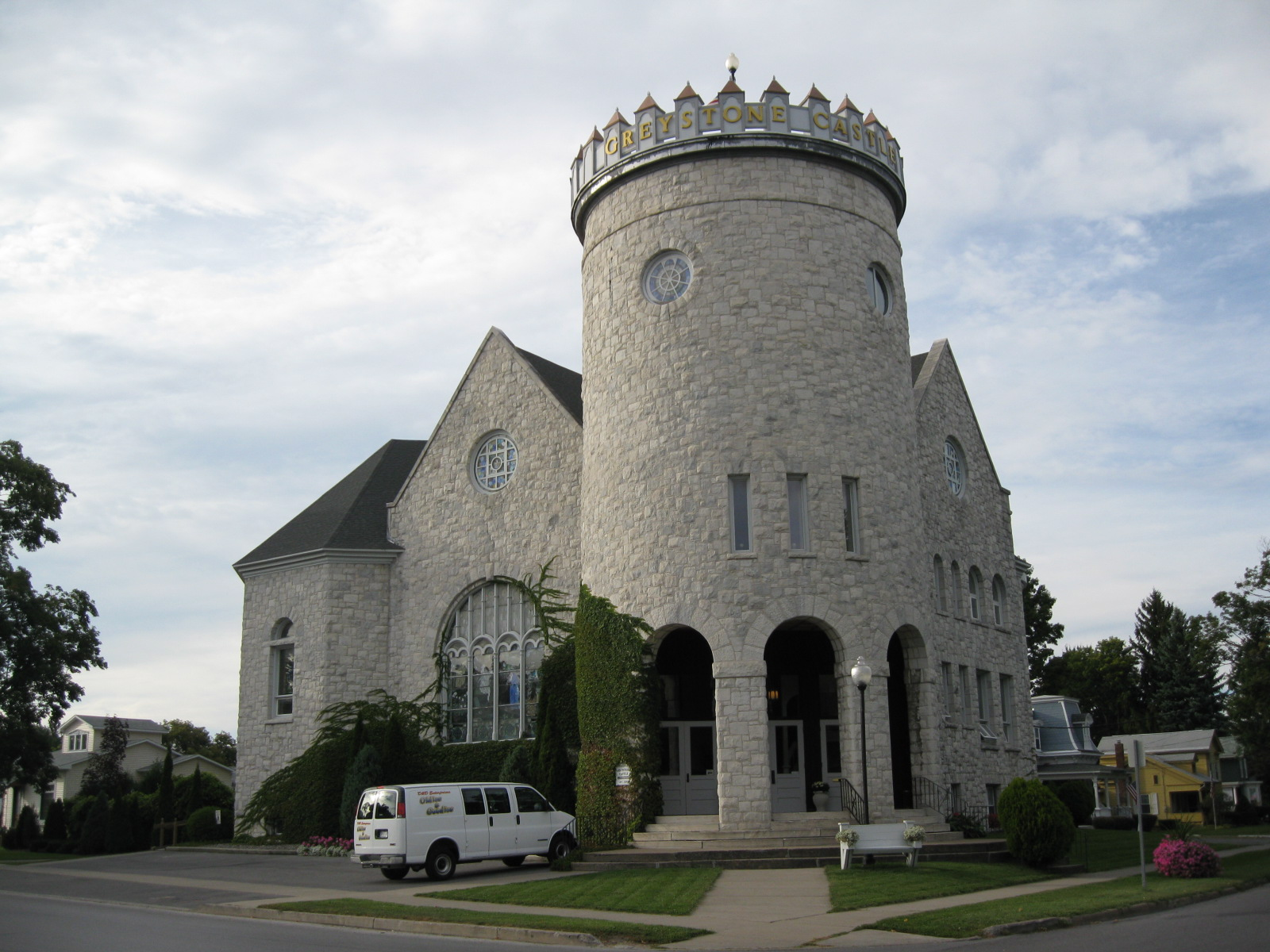

- Location within New York Location within the United States
- Location: Main and New Boston Sts., Canastota, New York
- Coordinates: 43°4′52″N 75°45′19″W
- Area: less than one acre
- Built: 1909
- Architect: Merrick & Randall; Pennsylvania White Marble Co.
- Architectural style: Romanesque, Richardsonian Romanesque
- MPS: Canastota Village MRA
- NRHP reference No.: 86001293
- Added to NRHP: May 23, 1986

Canastota Methodist Church, now known as Greystone Community Center, or Greystone Castle, is a historic Methodist church at Main and New Boston streets in Canastota in Madison County, New York. It was built in 1909 and is a large, asymmetrical building built of Pennsylvania white marble. It reflects the influence of the Richardsonian Romanesque style in its heavy, horizontal massing, wrought-hewn masonry construction and broad, round arch door and window openings. A tower has a crenellated turret at the top.

It was added to the National Register of Historic Places in 1986.
