= United Church of Canastota =

Historic church in New York, United States

- U.S. National Register of Historic Places
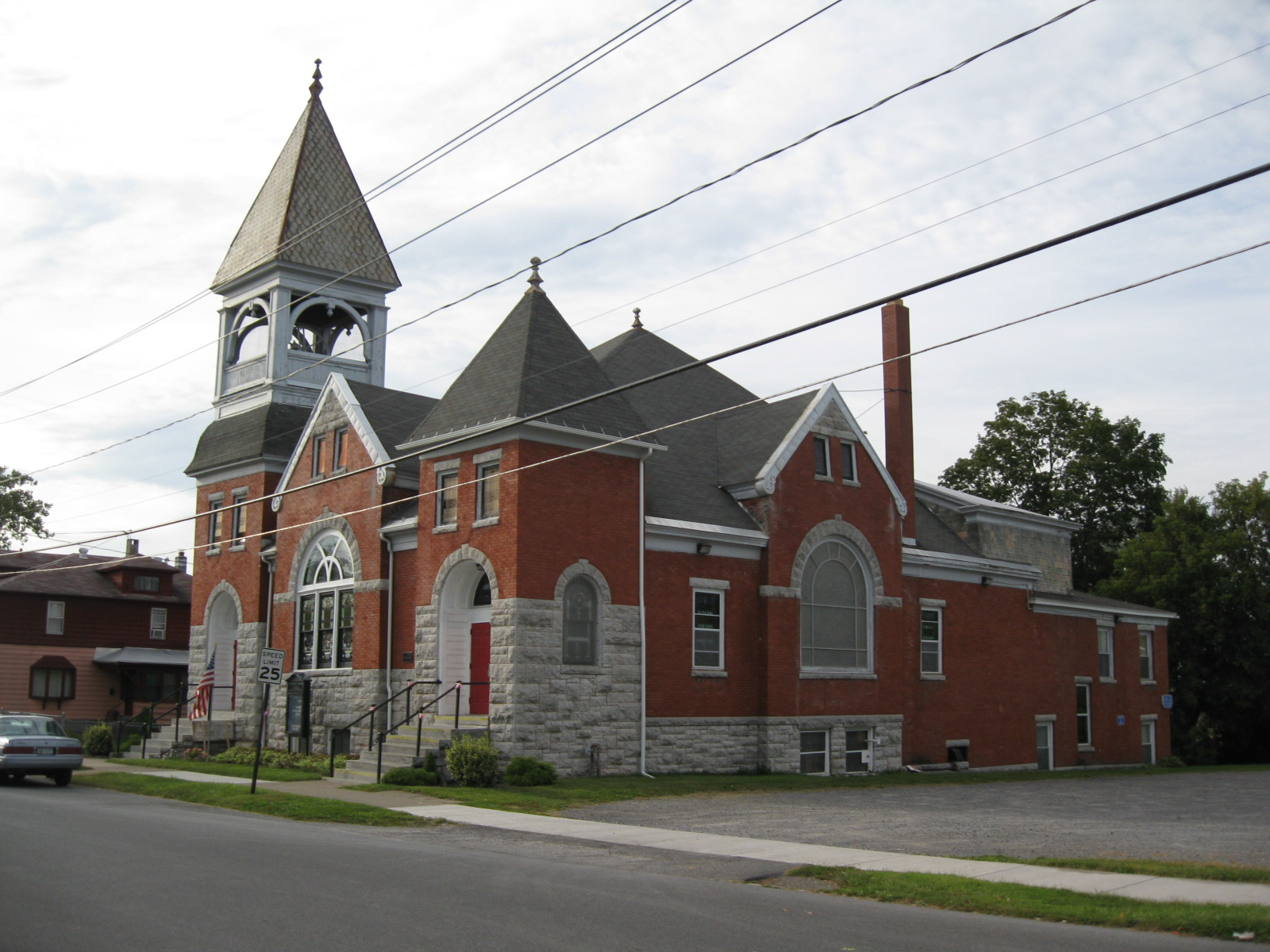
- United Church of Canastota, September 2009

- Location within New York Location within the United States
- Location: 144 W. Center St., Canastota, New York
- Coordinates: 43°4′42″N 75°45′14″W
- Area: less than one acre
- Built: 1903
- Architect: Hubbard, Melvin H.; McPherson, J.W.
- Architectural style: Gothic, High Victorian Eclectic
- MPS: Canastota Village MRA
- NRHP reference No.: 86001306
- Added to NRHP: May 23, 1986

United Church of Canastota is a historic church at 144 W. Center Street in Canastota, New York. It was built in 1903, and is a large, rectangular stone and brick building with a multi-gabled roof and a variety of towers and cross gables.

It was added to the National Register of Historic Places in 1986.
