= Niles Farmhouse =

Historic building in New York state

- U.S. National Register of Historic Places
- Location within New York Location within the United States
- Location: Rippleton Rd., Cazenovia, New York
- Coordinates: 42°54′45″N 75°52′8″W
- Area: 2.2 acres (0.89 ha)
- Built: 1807
- Architectural style: Federal
- MPS: Cazenovia Town MRA
- NRHP reference No.: 87001871
- Added to NRHP: November 02, 1987

Niles Farmhouse is a historic farmhouse located at Cazenovia in Madison County, New York. It was built about 1807 and is a two-story, gable roofed frame residence in the Federal style. Also on the property is a barn.

It was added to the National Register of Historic Places in 1987.
