= Upenough =

Historic house in New York, United States

- U.S. National Register of Historic Places
- U.S. Historic district
- Location within New York Location within the United States
- Location: Rippleton St., Cazenovia, New York
- Coordinates: 42°54′12″N 75°52′34″W
- Area: 4.9 acres (2.0 ha)
- Built: 1910
- Architect: King, Melvin
- Architectural style: Colonial Revival, Vernacular Dutch Colonial Revival
- MPS: Cazenovia Town MRA
- NRHP reference No.: 91000871
- Added to NRHP: July 15, 1991

Upenough is a historic home and national historic district located at Cazenovia in Madison County, New York. The district contains four contributing buildings. The main house was built about 1910 and is a two-story, wood-frame dwelling in the Dutch Colonial Revival style. It features a widely flaring gambrel roof intersected by dormers on the front and rear. Also on the property is a guest cottage, tool shed, and garage.

It was added to the National Register of Historic Places in 1991.
