= Zephnia Comstock Farmhouse =

Historic house in New York, United States

- U.S. National Register of Historic Places
- Location within New York Location within the United States
- Location: 2363 Nelson St., Cazenovia, New York
- Coordinates: 42°55′30″N 75°50′19″W
- Area: 2 acres (0.81 ha)
- Built: 1830
- Architectural style: Federal, Vernacular Federal
- MPS: Cazenovia Town MRA
- NRHP reference No.: 87001866
- Added to NRHP: November 02, 1987

Zephnia Comstock Farmhouse is a historic home located at Cazenovia in Madison County, New York. It is a two-story, five-bay, rectangular frame structure with a gable roof built about 1830 in the Federal style. Also on the property is a late 19th-century barn.

It was added to the National Register of Historic Places in 1987.
