= Shattuck House =

Historic house in New York, United States

- U.S. National Register of Historic Places
- Location within New York Location within the United States
- Location: W. Lake Rd., Cazenovia, New York
- Coordinates: 42°58′16″N 75°53′4″W
- Area: 15.2 acres (6.2 ha)
- Built: 1928
- Architect: Hueber, Paul, Sr.; Kimmey, Raymond
- Architectural style: Colonial Revival, Bungalow/Craftsman
- MPS: Cazenovia Town MRA
- NRHP reference No.: 91000873
- Added to NRHP: July 15, 1991

Shattuck House, also known as Longshore House, is a historic home located at Cazenovia in Madison County, New York. It was built in 1928 and is an asymmetrically massed, 2 1/2-story frame residence built in a combination of the American Craftsman and Colonial Revival styles. It was built as a summer home for Frank M. Shattuck, a Syracuse restaurateur.

It was added to the National Register of Historic Places in 1991.
