= Tall Pines (Cazenovia, New York) =

Historic house in New York, United States

- U.S. National Register of Historic Places
- Location within New York Location within the United States
- Location: Ridge Rd., Cazenovia, New York
- Coordinates: 42°57′3″N 75°51′23″W
- Area: 2.2 acres (0.89 ha)
- Built: 1835
- Architectural style: Federal
- MPS: Cazenovia Town MRA
- NRHP reference No.: 87001875
- Added to NRHP: November 02, 1987

Tall Pines is a historic home located at Cazenovia in Madison County, New York. The main block of the house was built about 1835 and is a two-story, three-bay, rectangular, frame building in the Federal style. A wing was added to it in stages during the 19th and early 20th centuries. Also on the property is a guest house.

It was added to the National Register of Historic Places in 1987.
