= York Lodge (Cazenovia, New York) =

Historic house in New York, United States

- U.S. National Register of Historic Places
- U.S. Historic district
- Location within New York Location within the United States
- Location: 4448 E. Lake Rd., Cazenovia, New York
- Coordinates: 42°56′21″N 75°51′29″W
- Area: 5.1 acres (2.1 ha)
- Built: 1904
- Architect: Page, George Bisham; Heffernan, Timothy
- Architectural style: Colonial Revival, Gothic, Tudor Revival
- MPS: Cazenovia Town MRA
- NRHP reference No.: 91000872
- Added to NRHP: July 15, 1991

York Lodge, also known as Bittersweet, is a historic home and national historic district located at Cazenovia in Madison County, New York. The district contains six contributing buildings and one contributing site. The main house, which was built about 1904, is an eclectic mansion with features reflecting a combination of the then popular Jacobethan Revival, Georgian Revival, and Shingle Styles. It is a 2 1/2-story, L-shaped, frame dwelling built as a summer residence. It features a 2-story, semi-circular sleeping porch with shingled piers and a conical roof. Also on the property is a gazebo, carriage house, gardener's cottage, garage, and two work sheds.

It was added to the National Register of Historic Places in 1991.
