= Hillcrest (Cazenovia, New York) =

Historic house in New York, United States

- U.S. National Register of Historic Places
- U.S. Historic district
- Location within New York Location within the United States
- Location: Ridge Rd. S of Hoffman, Cazenovia, New York
- Coordinates: 42°56′20″N 75°51′27″W
- Area: 8.1 acres (3.3 ha)
- Built: 1903
- Architectural style: Colonial Revival, Queen Anne
- MPS: Cazenovia Town MRA
- NRHP reference No.: 91000869
- Added to NRHP: July 15, 1991

Hillcrest is a historic home and national historic district located at Cazenovia in Madison County, New York. The district contains four contributing buildings. The main house was built in 1903 and is an irregularly massed, three story frame residence built in a combination of the Colonial Revival and Queen Anne styles. It features a conical, three story turret and rounded, one story enclosed porch. Also on the property is a carriage house, guest house, and formal gateway.

It was added to the National Register of Historic Places in 1991.
