= List of New York State Historic Markers in Madison County, New York =

This is an incomplete list of New York State Historic Markers in Madison County, New York.

== Listings county-wide ==
Marker name	Image	Location	City/Town	Coords	Marker text
BAPTIST CHURCH		On NYS 13 At New Woodstock	Cazenovia, Town Of, New York	42°50′53.58″N 75°51′31.38″W	First In Town Of Cazenovia. Unbroken Service Since Organization July 17, 1801. This Building Erected 1815.
CAZENOVIA		Cazenovia Lake	Cazenovia, Town Of, New York		Founding of the Village of Cazenovia
FIRST COUNTY SEAT		On Seminary St. Between Sullivan & Lincklaen Sts.	Cazenovia, Town Of, New York		This Building Erectd For Court House 1810. Courts Held 1812-17. Sold To Methodists 1818. Conference Seminary Established 1824.
EZRA CORNELL		On Co. Rd. about 3½ miles east of De Ruyter	De Ruyter, Town Of, New York		300 Yards Up This Lane Stood His Boyhood Home In 1828 He Walked To Ithaca Where Later He Founded Cornell University.
ARROW		On Co. Rd. about 5 miles east of De Ruyter	De Ruyter, Town Of, New York		Muller Hill Estate Of Louis A. Muller Who Located Here In 1808.
ARROW		On NYS 13 At De Ruyter	De Ruyter, Town Of, New York		3½ miles site of Boyhood Home Ezra Cornell Founder Of Cornell University
BAPTIST CHURCH		On NYS 26 At Eaton	Eaton, Town Of, New York	42°51′00.60″N 75°36′31.44″W	Organized 1816. Erected 1819. Repaired And Improved 1856. Rev. J. Colley, 1St Minister. Rev. Nathaniel Kendrick, Pastor 1817–1833
DR. JAMES PRATT		On NYS 26 At Eaton	Eaton, Town Of, New York		First Physician In Town Of Eaton, 1797, Taught First School In Homes Of Joseph Morse Col. Leland And Thomas Morris Alternately.
FANNY FORESTER		On NYS 26 about 1/2 mile west of Eaton	Eaton, Town Of, New York	42°51′05.92″N 75°38′46.08″W	Author Of "Alderbrook Tales" Born Emily Chubbuck Aug. 22, 1817; Married Dr. A. Judson: Her Home "Underhill Cottage" Stood About On This Site.
HOME OF		On NYS 26 At Eaton	Eaton, Town Of, New York	42°51′13.92″N 75°36′13.50″W	Cyrus And Elizabeth Heminway Finney. Married July 25, 1797. Came From New England And Settled Here 1797.
MORSE HOUSE		On NYS 26 At Eaton	Eaton, Town Of, New York	42°50′57.96″N 75°36′54.48″W	Joseph Morse, Eunice Bigelow From Sherburne, Mass. 1796 Founded "Log City" 1800 Later Named Eaton 1807 Built This House 1802
MORSE MILL DAM		On NYS 26 At Eaton	Eaton, Town Of, New York	42°50′57.54″N 75°37′09.78″W	Development Of Eaton Brook Water Power Begun By Joseph Morse 1796 Created County Industrial Center Lasting A Century To 1896
N.Y. STATE SCHOOL		On US 20 At Morrisville	Eaton, Town Of, New York		Of Agriculture Morrisville, N.y. Established 1908 First Director, F.g. Helyar April 1, 1910 – November 15, 1917
N.Y. STATE SCHOOL		On US 20 At Morrisville	Eaton, Town Of, New York		Of Agriculture Morrisville, N.y. Established 1908 First Director, F.g. Helyar April 1, 1910 – November 15, 1917
SAGE TAVERN IN LOG CITY		On NYS 26, At Eaton	Eaton, Town Of, New York		Built And Run By Isaac Sage 1802. Oldest House In Village Of Eaton.
SITE OF		On US 20 At Morrisville	Eaton, Town Of, New York		Champlain Battle 1615 [Arrow] Nichols Pond Park, On Oneida Indian Village Site 10 Miles North
SITE OF FARM		On Tn. Rd. about 1/4 mile north of Eaton	Eaton, Town Of, New York		Brought In 1799 By Caleb Dunbar, Born Bridgewater, Mass., 1760. Married Hannah Drake, Born Eaton, Mass., 1762
SITE OF HOME		On NYS 26 about 2 miles northeast of Eaton	Eaton, Town Of, New York	42°52′46.68″N 75°34′18.42″W	1793, Col. Joshua Leland. First Settler In This Valley. He Built First Grist Mill On Stream Between These Ponds.
SITE OF LOG HOUSE		On NYS 26 about 1/2 mile northeast of Eaton	Eaton, Town Of, New York		Of Levi Bonney, Born 1775, Married Rhoda Pratt. Came From Cornwal, Conn., 1795 First To Come And Remain In This Valley.
TOLL GATE NO. 1		On NYS 26 about 1 mile northeast of Eaton	Eaton, Town Of, New York		Peck's Port, Eaton And Georgetown Plank Road, 1849. Sawen Morse, 1St White Child Born In Eaton Was 1St Keeper Of This Gate.
TOLL GATE NO. 2		On NYS 26 about 1/2 mile west of Eaton	Eaton, Town Of, New York	42°51′01.14″N 75°38′08.34″W	Peck's Port, Eaton And Georgetown Plank Road, 1849.
Grain Pits		At Nichols Pond about 6 miles south of Canastota	Fenner, Town Of, New York	43°00′16″N 75°44′28″W	These pits are remains of community storage cellars for corn, beans and squash. USed by the Iroquois Indians
INDIAN SPRING		At Nichols Pond about 6 miles south of Canastota	Fenner, Town Of, New York		This Was Outside The Area Of The Fort And Not Protected By The Palisades
ONEIDA STONE		At Nichols Pond about 6 miles south of Canastota	Fenner, Town Of, New York		Of 1615 Oneida Means People Of The Standing Stone. In Each Village Was Such An Altar And Council Place
Site of CHAMPLAIN BATTLE		On Tn. Rd. about 6 miles south of Canastota	Fenner, Town Of, New York	43°00′9″N 75°44′29″W	Here Champlain Aided By Huron Indians Attacked The Stockaded Oneida Village Oct. 10-16, 1615
MULLER HILL		On Tn. Rd. about 1½ miles west of Georgetown	Georgetown, Town Of, New York	42°46′09.00″N 75°46′47.88″W	Estate Of Louis A. Muller, Distinguished French Refugee Who Located Here In 1808. Doubtless Nobleman Fleeing From Vengeance Of Napoleon
ARROW		On NYS 80 At Georgetown	Georgetown, Town Of, New York	42°46′08.10″N 75°44′19.02″W	Muller Hill Estate Of Louis A. Muller Who Located Here In 1808.
MADISON STREET CEMETERY		On Madison St. At Hamilton	Hamilton, Town Of, New York		Established About 1830 Elisha Payne Founder Of The Village Of Hamilton Is Buried Here
1/4 MILE LEFT		On NYS 12B about 3¾ miles south of Hamilton	Lebanon, Town Of, New York		Stood The Home Of Col. Wm. S. Smith Aide To Washington And Abigail Adams Smith See Marker Ahead
1/4 MILE LEFT		On NYS 12B about 4¼ miles south of Hamilton	Lebanon, Town Of, New York		Stood The Home Of Col. Wm. S. Smith Aide To Washington And Abigail Adams Smith See Marker Ahead
HERE IN 1788 STOOD		On Co. Rd. about 2 miles south of Eaton	Lebanon, Town Of, New York		The Bark Hut Of Bates, Stowell And Salisbury, First Settlers Of What Is Now Madison County
HOUSE BUILT BY		On Co. Rd. about 2 miles south of Eaton	Lebanon, Town Of, New York		Enoch Stowell, Jr. Early Settler. Home Of Horace Stowell, Prominent Abolitionist. Station Of Underground Railway
SMITH'S VALLEY		On Co. Rd. At Randallsville	Lebanon, Town Of, New York		Col. W.s. Smith & Family Early Settlers & Owners Of Great Tracts Of Land In This Section
HOME OF		On NYS 13 At Intersectionof Peterboro St.. & Rasback St., Canastota	Lenox, Town Of, New York		Milton Delano Clerk Of Town Of Old Lenox. Twice Elected Sheriff Of Madison County Member Of Congress, 1888–1892
HOME OF		On Main St. At Canastota	Lenox, Town Of, New York		Thomas Barlow Historian, County Judge In 1843, Member Of The New York State Senate, 1844–1847
QUALITY HILL		On NYS 5 about 2 miles west of Canastota	Lenox, Town Of, New York		Green A Company Of Horse Artillery Drilled Here During The War Of 1812
SITE OF		On NYS 31 At Messinger Bay	Lenox, Town Of, New York		Erected In 1814 By George Messinger
SITE OF		On US 20 At Canastota	Lenox, Town Of, New York		Champlain Battle 1615 [Arrow] Nichols Pond Park an Oneida Village site 6 miles south
TO SITE OF		On Tn. Rd. At Clockville	Lincoln, Town Of, New York		Champlain Battle 1615 [Arrow]
WELSH CHURCH		On US 20 1 mile east of Nelson	Nelson, Town Of, New York		One Mile [Arrow] Welsh Congregational Society Founded June 22, 1850 Present Church Building Erected 1876
TO SITE OF		On County Rd. At Peterboro	Smithfield, Town Of, New York		Champlain Battle 1615 [Arrow]
TO SITE OF		On Mile Strip Rd. about 6 miles south of Canastota	Smithfield, Town Of, New York		Champlain Battle 1615 [Arrow]
ARROW		On County Rd. about 2 miles northwest of Peterboro	Smithfield, Town Of, New York		500 Feet Gerrit S. Miller Home Of Early Imported Holstein Cattle.
BIRTHPLACE		On NYS 46 about 1 mile south of Munnsville	Stockbridge, Town Of, New York		W. Dempster Hoard, Born Oct. 10, 1839. Governor Of Wisconsin 1889-90 Founder Hoard's Dairyman
WILLIAM NEWTON CLARKE		On Seminary St. Between Sullivan & Lincklaen Sts.	Cazenovia, Town Of, New York 42° 55' 52.068" -75° 51' 15.408"	42°55′52.07″N 75°51′15.41″W	1841–1912 preacher, teacher and author of books on modern theological thought.
WTM ENGINE WORKS		Behind the A-n-W Gas Station in Eaton, NY	Eaton, Town Of, New York	42°51′01.50″N 75°36′39.90″W	Site of wood tabor & Morse's steam engine mfg. 1852–1893 maker of the first 4-wheel drive steam traction engine. Worlds largest steam engine co. in the 1880s
TEMPERANCE HOUSE		On NYS 92, ½ Mile East of Oran, NY	Cazenovia, Town Of, New York	42°57′46.62″N 75°54′21.06″W	Served as turnpike tavern for almost 60 YRS. Built and opened by Cyrenus Bartholomew in 1815. Closed in 1872 when the Chenango R.R. opened and passed it by.
LATERAL CANAL		In the village of Chittenango, NY, on Parker Ln, next to the Sullivan Free Library.	Sullivan, Town Of, New York	43°02′39.00″N 75°51′59.00″W	Company incorporated 1818. Canal in use by 1824. Site of turn-around basin for canal boat transportation north to the grand old erie.

== See also ==
- List of New York State Historic Markers
- National Register of Historic Places listings in New York
- List of National Historic Landmarks in New York
