= DeRuyter (village), New York =

DeRuyter, New York
- Village
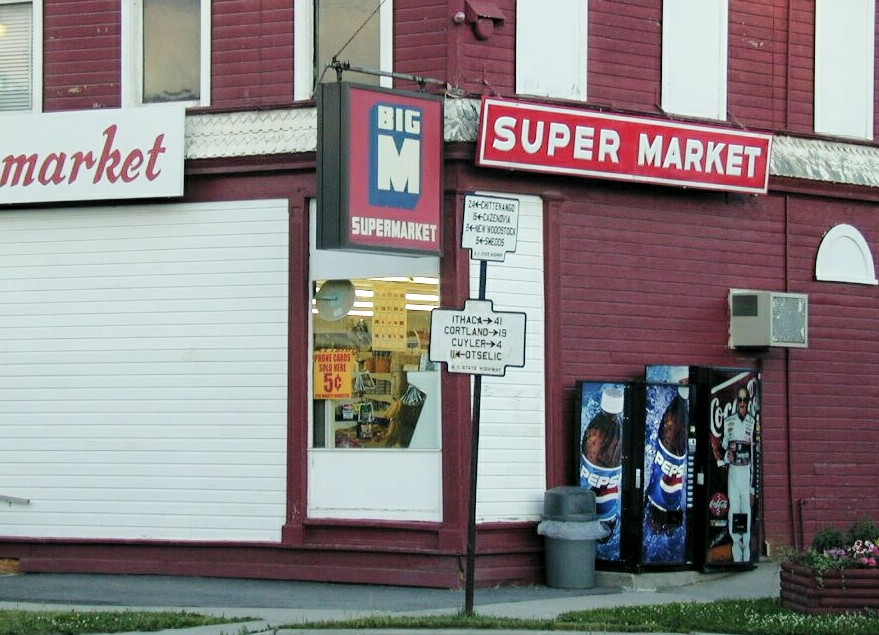
- Old N.Y. State Highway signs at the corner of Utica and Cortland streets (NYS Rt. 13) in the village of DeRuyter (July 2001 photo)

- Location within New York Location within the United States
- Coordinates: 42°45′32″N 75°53′6″W
- Country: United States
- State: New York
- County: Madison
- Town: DeRuyter

Area
  - Total: 0.37 sq mi (0.96 km^{2})
  - Land: 0.37 sq mi (0.96 km^{2})
  - Water: 0 sq mi (0.00 km^{2})
- Elevation: 1,286 ft (392 m)

Population (2020)
  - Total: 408
  - Density: 1,105.69/sq mi (426.91/km^{2})
- Time zone: UTC-5 (Eastern (EST))
  - Summer (DST): UTC-4 (EDT)
- ZIP Code: 13052
- Area code: 315
- FIPS code: 36-20390
- GNIS feature ID: 0948102
- Website: www.deruyter.gov

DeRuyter /dəˈraɪtər/ is a village in the town of DeRuyter in Madison County, New York, United States. The population was 408 at the 2020 census, down from 558 in 2010. The village and town are named after Michiel Adriaenszoon de Ruyter, a famous admiral in the Dutch navy.

The village is located in the southwestern corner of the town of DeRuyter on Route 13.

== History ==
DeRuyter was originally part of the ancient town of Whitestown, a component of the famous "Lincklaen purchase". It became part of Cazenovia when that town was formed in 1795, and Col. John Lincklaen gave it the name of "Tromptown"; but when the act authorizing the formation of a new town was passed by the New York State Legislature on March 15, 1798, Col. Lincklaen named it "DeRuyter", after his illustrious countryman.

The village of DeRuyter was incorporated in 1833. The location of the village at the confluence of four valleys made DeRuyter an early center of trade. The railroad forming a part of the "old Midland", running east and west, and the Cazenovia branch running north and south and now forming part of the Lehigh Valley system, furnished excellent facilities for trade and travel.

The building stock dates predominantly from the early to late Victorian period, the peak population and commercial era in DeRuyter's history.

The Seventh Day Baptist Church was listed on the National Register of Historic Places in 2005.

== Geography ==
DeRuyter is located near the southwestern corner of Madison County at 42°45′32″N 75°53′6″W (42.758925, -75.885114), along the western border of the town of DeRuyter. It is bordered to the west by the town of Cuyler in Cortland County.

New York State Route 13 passes through the village, leading north 15 miles (24 km) to Cazenovia and southwest 20 miles (32 km) to Cortland.

According to the U.S. Census Bureau, the village has a total area of 0.37 square miles (0.96 km^{2}) all of it recorded as land. The East Branch of Tioughnioga Creek passes through the village, one of the headwaters of the East Branch of the Tioughnioga River, which flows southwest to form the Tioughnioga River proper at Cortland.

== Demographics ==
Historical population
Census	Pop.	Note	%±
1870	605		—
1880	586		−3.1%
1890	667		13.8%
1900	623		−6.6%
1910	538		−13.6%
1920	519		−3.5%
1930	466		−10.2%
1940	526		12.9%
1950	561		6.7%
1960	627		11.8%
1970	643		2.6%
1980	542		−15.7%
1990	568		4.8%
2000	531		−6.5%
2010	558		5.1%
2020	408		−26.9%
U.S. Decennial Census

As of the census of 2000, there were 531 people, 213 households, and 142 families residing in the village. The population density was 1,546.2 inhabitants per square mile (597.0/km^{2}). There were 231 housing units at an average density of 672.6 per square mile (259.7/km^{2}). The racial makeup of the village was 97.36% White, 0.75% Black or African American, 0.38% Native American, 0.56% Asian, and 0.94% from two or more races. Hispanic or Latino of any race were 0.19% of the population.

There were 213 households, out of which 31.0% had children under the age of 18 living with them, 50.2% were married couples living together, 12.2% had a female householder with no husband present, and 33.3% were non-families. 28.2% of all households were made up of individuals, and 15.0% had someone living alone who was 65 years of age or older. The average household size was 2.49 and the average family size was 3.00.

In the village, the population was spread out, with 26.2% under the age of 18, 7.9% from 18 to 24, 26.6% from 25 to 44, 23.0% from 45 to 64, and 16.4% who were 65 years of age or older. The median age was 38 years. For every 100 females, there were 78.8 males. For every 100 females age 18 and over, there were 85.8 males.

The median income for a household in the village was $31,420, and the median income for a family was $33,333. Males had a median income of $32,045 versus $25,000 for females. The per capita income for the village was $20,658. About 7.6% of families and 11.8% of the population were below the poverty line, including 18.3% of those under age 18 and 13.7% of those age 65 or over.

== Education ==
The DeRuyter Central School District is located on the western edge of the village on Railroad St. DeRuyter Central School is a public school district located in southwestern Madison County. The school houses grades K-12. The current school enrollment is 380 students from the area. The DeRuyter Central School district includes students from DeRuyter, Sheds, Cuyler (in Cortland County), Fabius (in Onondaga County) and Lincklaen (in Chenango County).

== Notable people ==
- Henry W. Bentley, congressman from New York
- Ezra Cornell, founder of Cornell University
- Marcus M. Drake, mayor of the city of Buffalo, New York
- Benjamin Enos, member of the New York State Assembly in the 1830s
- Lyman J. Gage, 42nd U.S. Secretary of the Treasury
- James W. Nye, senator from Nevada
- Fred Schule, Olympic medalist
- Henry Clay Vedder, Baptist Church historian
