= Twenty Townships =

Historic area in New York

The Twenty Townships are an area in central New York that now is largely a part of Madison and Chenango counties. The area was also known as Clinton's Purchase, for the sale by the Oneida Nation to New York in 1788 was made under Governor George Clinton.

In the late twentieth century, the United States Supreme Court ruled the sale had been unconstitutional, as the state had no authority to deal directly with the Native Americans, and never had its treaty ratified by the US Senate.

== Background ==
This area had been part of the Oneida people's homeland since their emergence as a culture in the fourteenth century. After the American Revolutionary War, the United States government allocated a reservation in this area for the Oneida Nation, who had been allies of the Patriots. But land pressure continued as European-American settlers poured into central and western New York seeking land to purchase and develop for farming. The state wanted more land available for sale.

On September 22, 1788 at Fort Schuyler, a treaty between Governor George Clinton and the Oneida Indians ceded this land from the tribe to the state of New York.

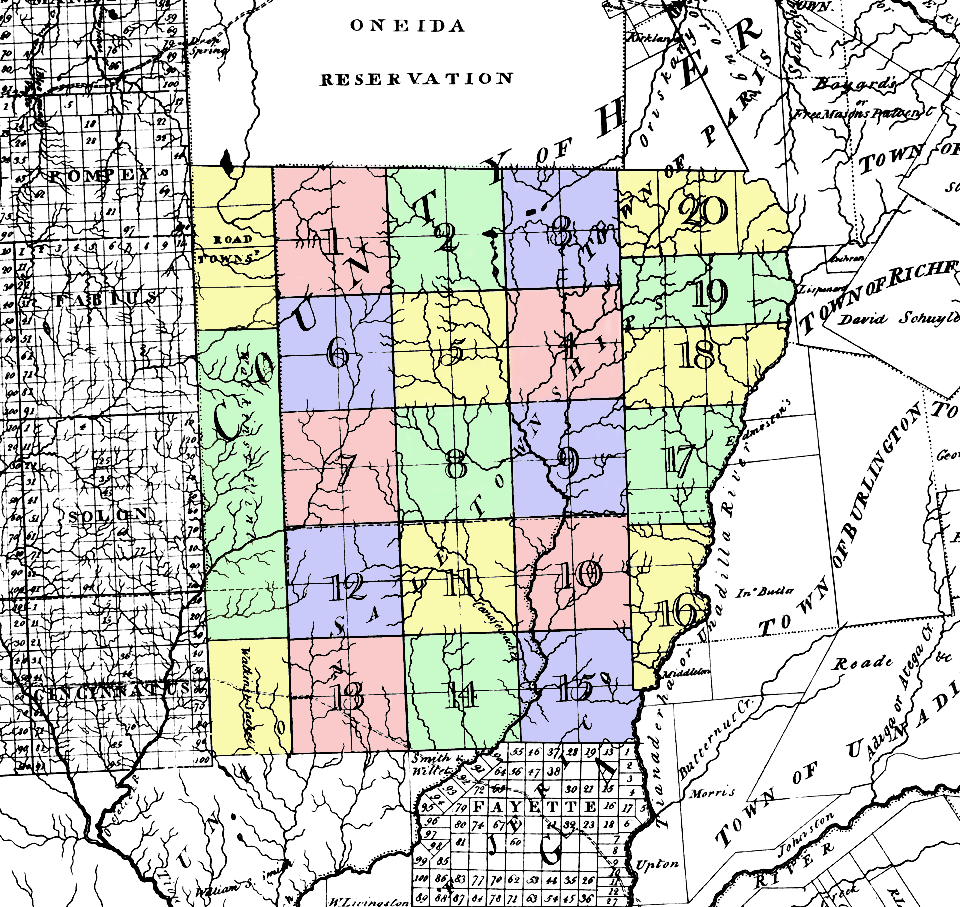
The "Twenty Townships" west of the Unadilla River, conveyed by the Oneida Indians in 1788. Known as "Clinton's Purchase"

The southern part of the Twenty Townships became a part of Chenango and the northern part was included in Madison County when it was created from Chenango County in 1806.

The northern townships that became a part of Madison County, New York were:

- 1. Nelson
- 2. Eaton
- 3. Madison
- 4. Hamilton
- 5. Lebanon
- 6. Georgetown
- 18. south part of Brookfield
- 19. north part of Brookfield

In 1829, the southern townships that became a part of Chenango County, New York were:

- 7.Otselic
- 8. Smyrna
- 9. Sherburne
- 10. north part of Norwich
- 11. Plymouth
- 12. Pharsalia
- 13. McDonough
- 14. Preston
- 15. south part of Norwich
- 16. New Berlin (also includes parts of 10 and 15)
- 17. Columbus

Township 20 became the Town of Sangerfield and the western part of Bridgewater in Oneida County.

In the late twentieth century, the Oneida Nation pursued a land claim against New York State to recover its lands or compensation. The United States Supreme Court ruled that, as this treaty and sale were never ratified by the United States Senate, it was unconstitutional. After the Revolution and the formation of the United States under a written constitution, New York State had no legal authority to negotiate separately with American Indian tribes.

== Sources ==
- Child's Gazetteer and Directory
- Map of the County of Chenango by David H. Burr, 1829. David Rumsey Map Collection; shows towns and lot numbers
- J. H. French, Gazetteer of the State of New York: Embracing a Comprehensive View of the State, and a Complete History and Description of Every County, City, Town, Village, and Locality with Full Tables of Statistics, 1860, p. 224
