= Muller Hill =

Historic site in New York, United States

Muller Hill State Forest
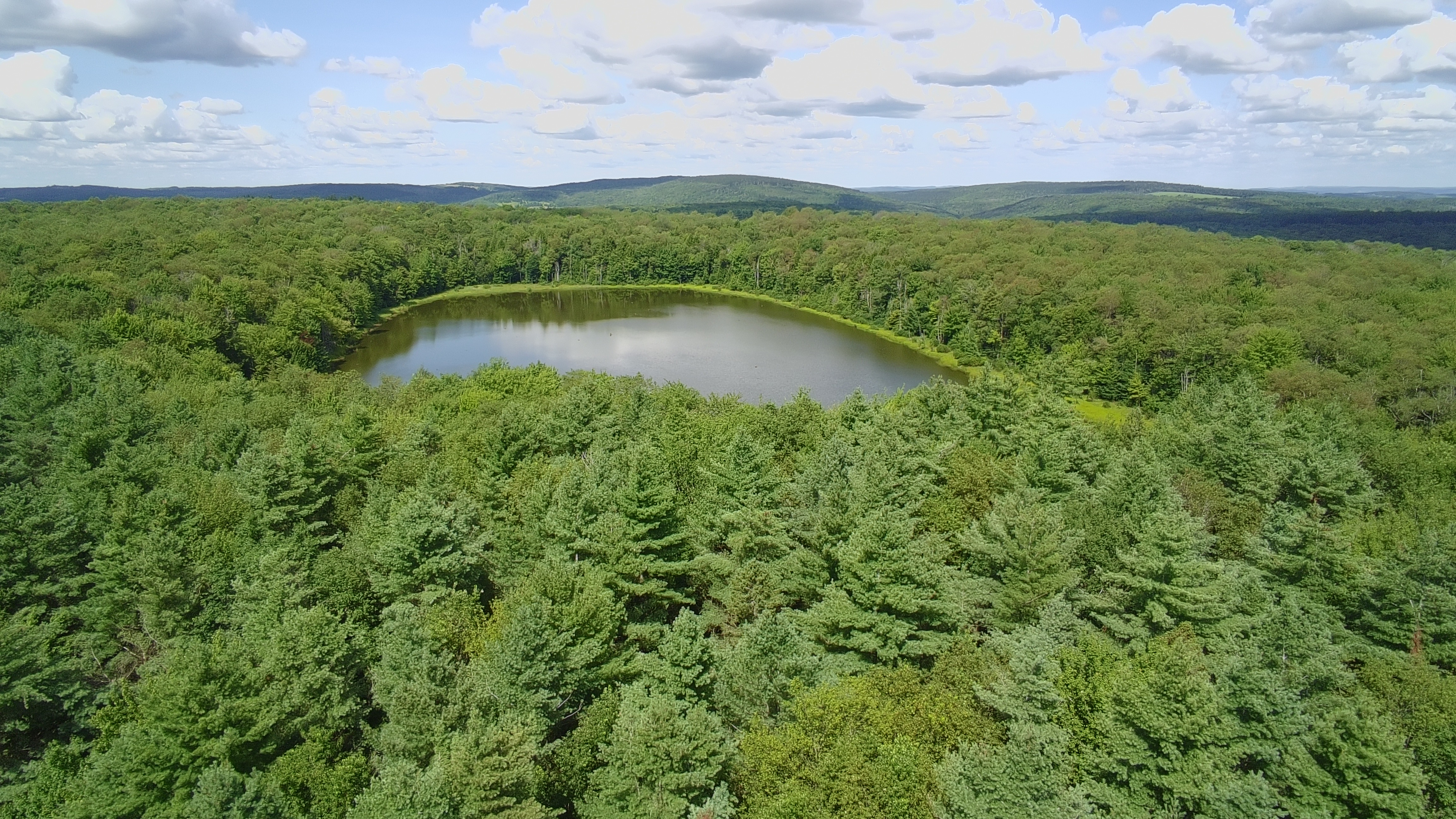
- An aerial view of the state forest, facing Muller Pond.

- Location within New York
- Location: Madison County, New York, US
- Nearest city: Georgetown, New York
- Coordinates: 42.7692°N 75.7800°W
- Area: 3,090 acres (1,250 ha)
- Designation: New York State Forest
- Governing body: New York State Department of Environmental Conservation

Muller Hill is a state forest and historic site near Georgetown in Madison County, New York, United States. In the early 19th century, a wealthy Frenchman who went by the name of "Louis Anathe Muller" lived on the site for several years. Muller constructed a house and developed a hamlet nearby, known as Bronder's Hollow. After he left the region in 1814, the house and hamlet fell into disrepair; Muller's home burnt down in the early 20th century and Bronder's Hollow all but disappeared. Muller's true identity was a popular subject of discussion in upstate New York for decades following his disappearance.

In the 1930s, the land was purchased by New York State, and it has since been maintained as a 3,090 acre (1,250 ha) state forest. It was the site of a juvenile prison, Camp Georgetown, from 1960 to 2011.

== Geography ==
The Muller Hill State Forest is 3,090 acres (1,250 ha), and includes over 7.5 miles (12.1 km) of roads, as well as a 0.25-mile (0.40 km) trail from one of the roads to Muller Pond, which was constructed by the State in 1953. The trees in the forest are largely northern hardwoods and conifers. The forest also contains 32 miles (51 km) of streams, which flow into the Tioughnioga and Otselic Rivers.

The western portion of the forest contains a segment of the "Link Trail", connecting the Finger Lakes Trail to the Erie Canalway Trail.

== History ==
In the early 19th-century, a man by the name of Louis Anathe Muller arrived in Payne's Corners (later Hamilton), New York.

On February 12, 1808, Muller purchased around 2,700 acres (1,100 ha) of land, near Georgetown and Sheds, from a New York City land speculator, for $7,862.25. On the plot, Muller began construction of a large house, hiring 150 men to help him clear the land. The house was 70 feet (21 m) by 30 feet (9.1 m), with walls built from black cherrywood. It was reported to be lavishly furnished, with fireplaces of black marble.

Muller also constructed an artificial fish pond on the plot. Nearby the house, he funded construction of a small hamlet, with several mills and a forge, known as Bronder's Hollow.

In 1814, Muller returned to France, after the fall of Napoleon. He returned to Muller Hill once in 1816, but by this point the house had been ransacked of valuable items. On April 9, 1816, he sold the property to a New York City merchant.

=== Identity ===
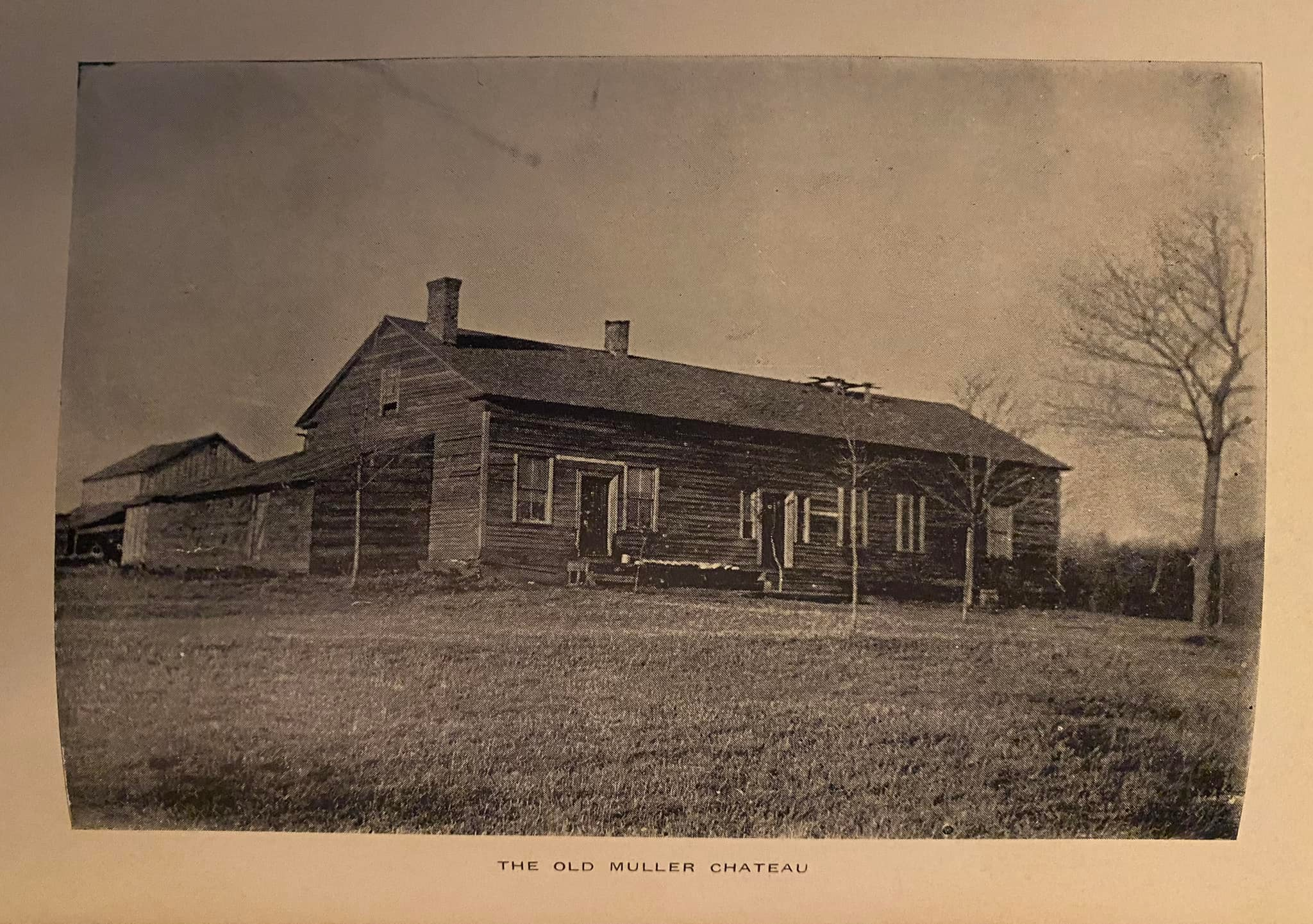
The Muller House pictured c. 1899

Rumors swirled in upstate New York about the true identity of Muller for decades after his departure. Many inhabitants agreed that Muller had been a wealthy Frenchman, who had fled the nation after Napoleon gained power. A popular theory was that Muller was really Charles, the Count of Artois and Louis XVI's brother, who would later become King of France in his own right. Muller's wife was reportedly Peter Stuyvesant's daughter; others argued she was a daughter of a laundress or had come with Muller from England.

In the 1930s, Samuel Sisson, a businessman in Syracuse, and Harold O. Whitnall, a professor at Colgate University, conducted extensive research into Muller's identity. Sisson and Whitnall concluded that Muller had been a general in the French Army and exiled in 1805.

=== Later history ===
After passing through several hands, Peter Stuyvesant purchased the land in 1837. The house continued to be a private residence for the next century. It burned down in 1906 or 1907. By the 1930s, only one building remained of what had been Bronder's Hollow.

In 1943, Harriet McDoual Daniels published a historical fiction romance novel titled Muller Hill that was inspired by the story of Louis Anathe Muller.

== State ownership ==
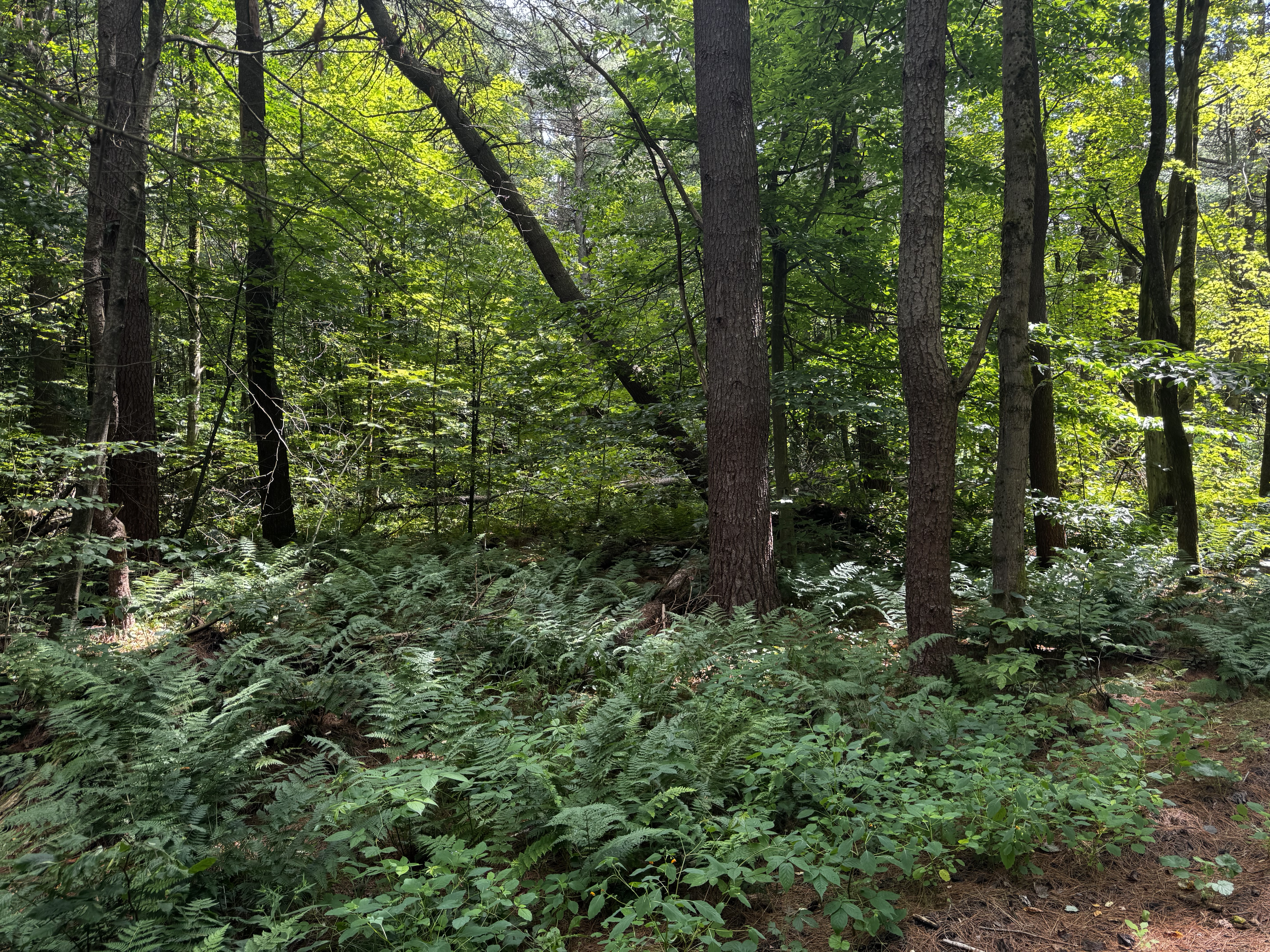
Muller Hill State Forest is approximately 70% forested; most of the trees are an estimated 70–120 years old.

After the passage of legislation establishing the New York State Forest program, the state began purchasing abandoned plots of land in the 1930s, including around 20,000 acres (8,100 ha) of land in Madison County. Eventually, the State Department of Environmental Conservation (DEC) gained ownership of the land which had been developed by Muller. Later that decade, two Civilian Conservation Corps (CCC) camps were established nearby. Men employed through this program planted trees and built roads at Muller Hill.

=== Camp Georgetown ===
From 1960 to 2011, the State Department of Corrections operated Camp Georgetown in the state forest, at the former site of a CCC camp. The minimum-security camp held juvenile offenders who worked on forest management and (beginning in 1970) community service. In 1970 a sawmill and wood treatment plant opened at the camp; they were closed in 1983. In 1999 the DEC classified the old wood treatment plant site as a class 2 Inactive Hazardous Waste Disposal Site due to the pentachlorophenol which had been used to treat the wood, and was present in the ground. The polluted earth was excavated in 2008, and water monitoring implemented. When it closed in 2011, Camp Georgetown had a capacity for 258 people and was holding 100. The site of the camp was sold to an individual in 2013, who planned to develop it into a science and technology summer camp, but as of 2017 that had not happened.

=== Later development ===
When the Finger Lakes Trail was developed it initially ended at the Muller Hill State Forest. In the late 1990s construction began on a "link trail" which would connect the trail to the Erie Canalway Trail, traveling through the forest. Work continued into the early 2000s.

The state forest is open for recreational uses including hiking, camping, mountain biking, snowshoeing, snowmobiling, cross country skiing, and fishing.
