= Seventh Day Baptist Church =

Seventh Day Baptist Church may refer to:

- Seventh Day Baptist Church (DeRuyter, New York), listed in the National Register of Historic Places in Madison County, New York
- Seventh Day Baptist Church (Milton, Wisconsin), listed on the National Register of Historic Places in Rock County, Wisconsin
- Seventh Day Baptist, a Christian Baptists sect that observes seventh-day Sabbath
