= Lebanon Reservoir =

- Location within New York Location within the United States
- Location: Madison County, New York, United States
- Coordinates: 42°48′04″N 75°36′06″W
- Type: Reservoir
- Primary outflows: Kingsley Brook
- Basin countries: United States
- Surface area: 92 acres (0.37 km^{2})
- Average depth: 18 feet (5.5 m)
- Max. depth: 48 ft (15 m)
- Shore length^{1}: 2.1 miles (3.4 km)
- Surface elevation: 1,309 ft (399 m)
- Settlements: Campbell, New York
- ^{1} Shore length is not a well-defined measure.

Lebanon Reservoir is a man-made lake is located north of Campbell, New York. Fish species present in the lake include pumpkinseed sunfish, and rainbow trout. There is access by state owned launch off Reservoir Road, 4 miles west of the Village of Hamilton, New York.
