= Spirit House (Georgetown, New York) =

Historic house in New York, United States

- U.S. National Register of Historic Places
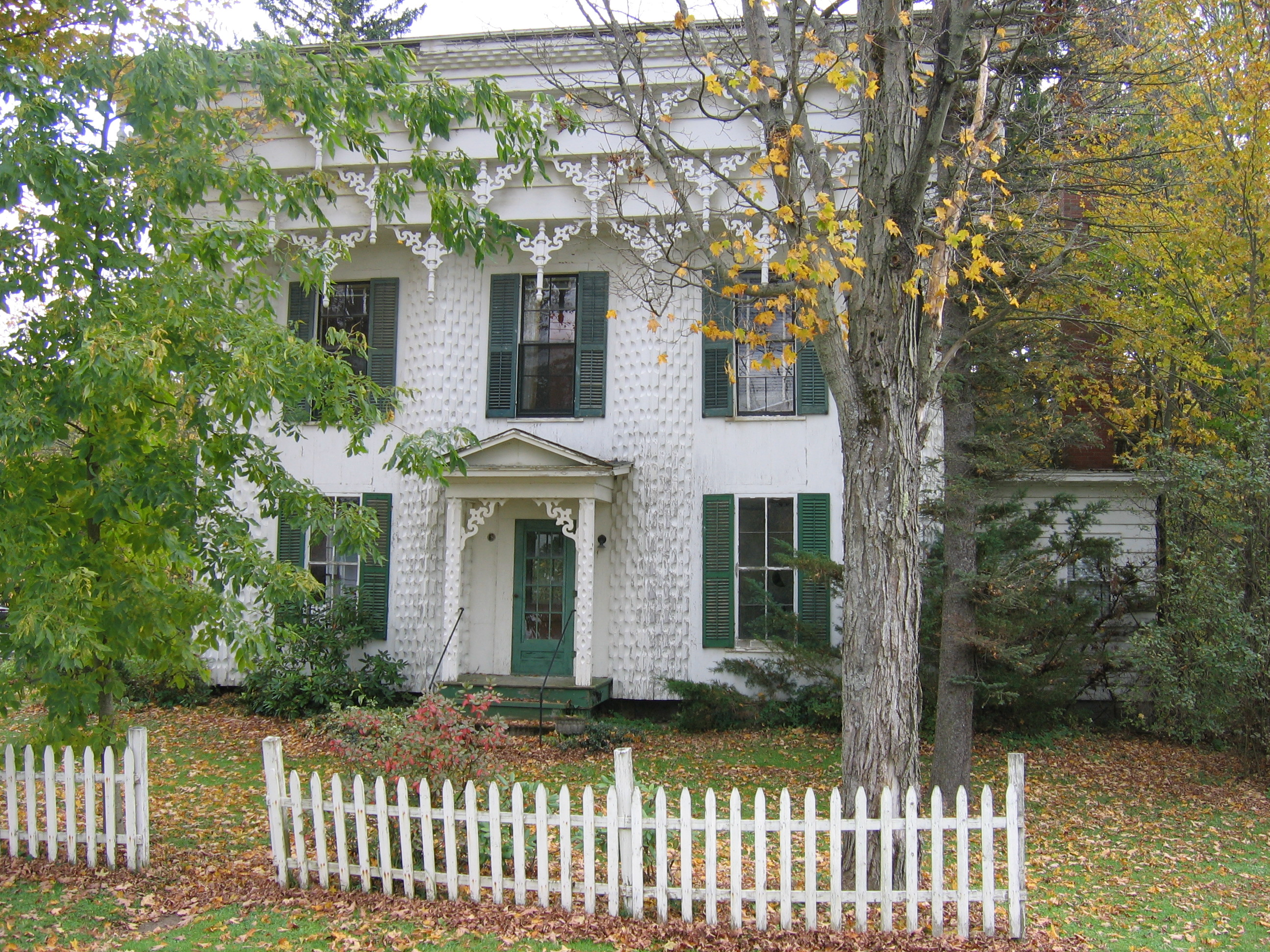

- Location within New York Location within the United States
- Location: NY 26, Georgetown, New York
- Coordinates: 42°40′32″N 75°44′15″W
- Area: less than one acre
- Built: 1865
- Architect: Brown, Timothy
- NRHP reference No.: 06000160
- Added to NRHP: March 22, 2006

Spirit House, also known as Timothy Brown House or Brown's Hall, is a historic home located at Georgetown in Madison County, New York. It was built about 1865 and is essentially a square, wood-frame structure. The exterior features two-by-fours arranged vertically and scalloped at regular intervals. The use of the scallop pattern gives the Spirit House a highly textured surface and it is almost impossible to discern how it is constructed without close inspection. It also features a three tiered cornice with downward pointing keys. It was constructed as a residence and for meetings of Spiritualists in a large hall on the second floor.

It was listed on the National Register of Historic Places in 2006.

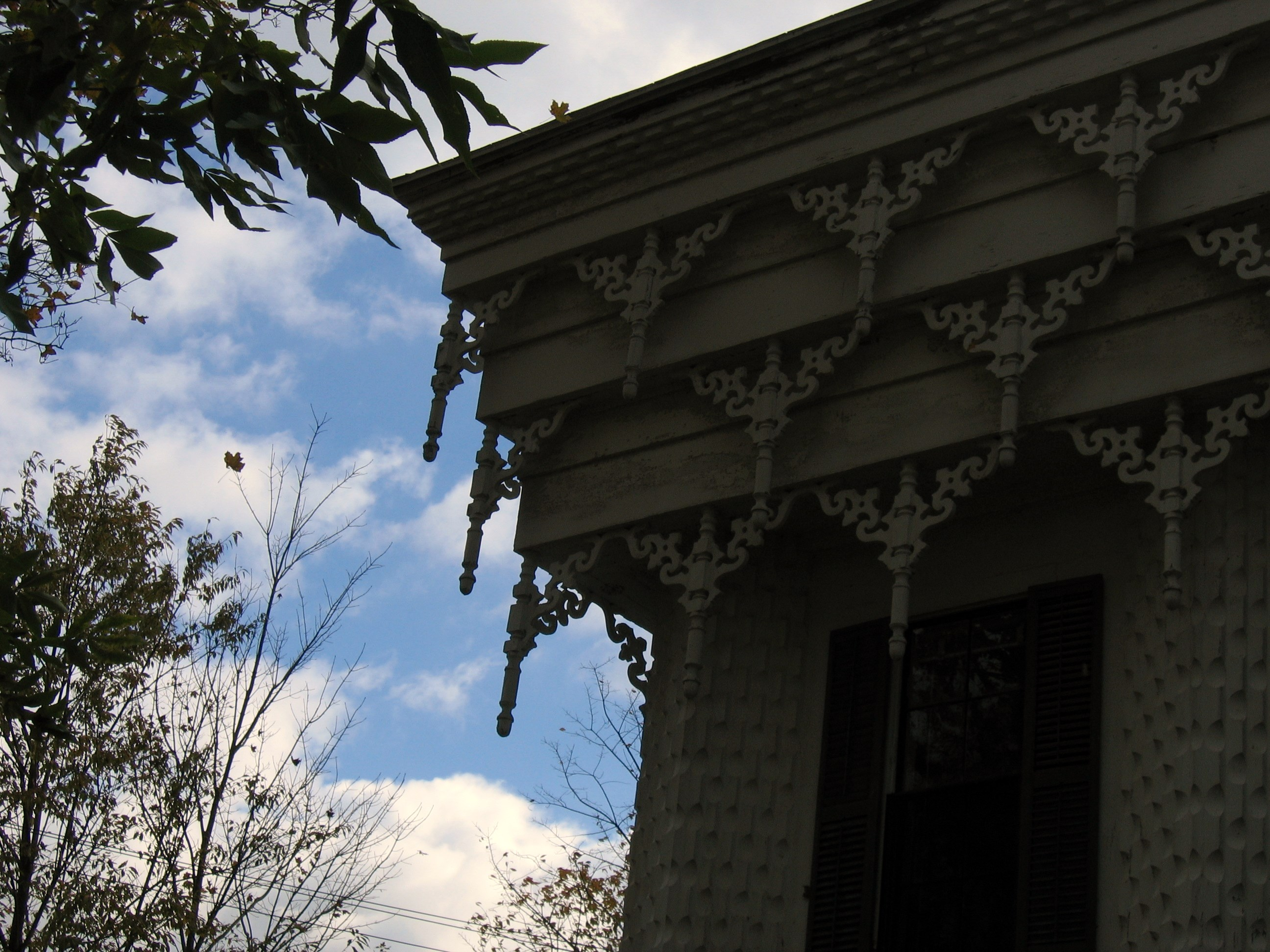
Detail in the cornice
