= Frederick Randolph Spencer =

American painter

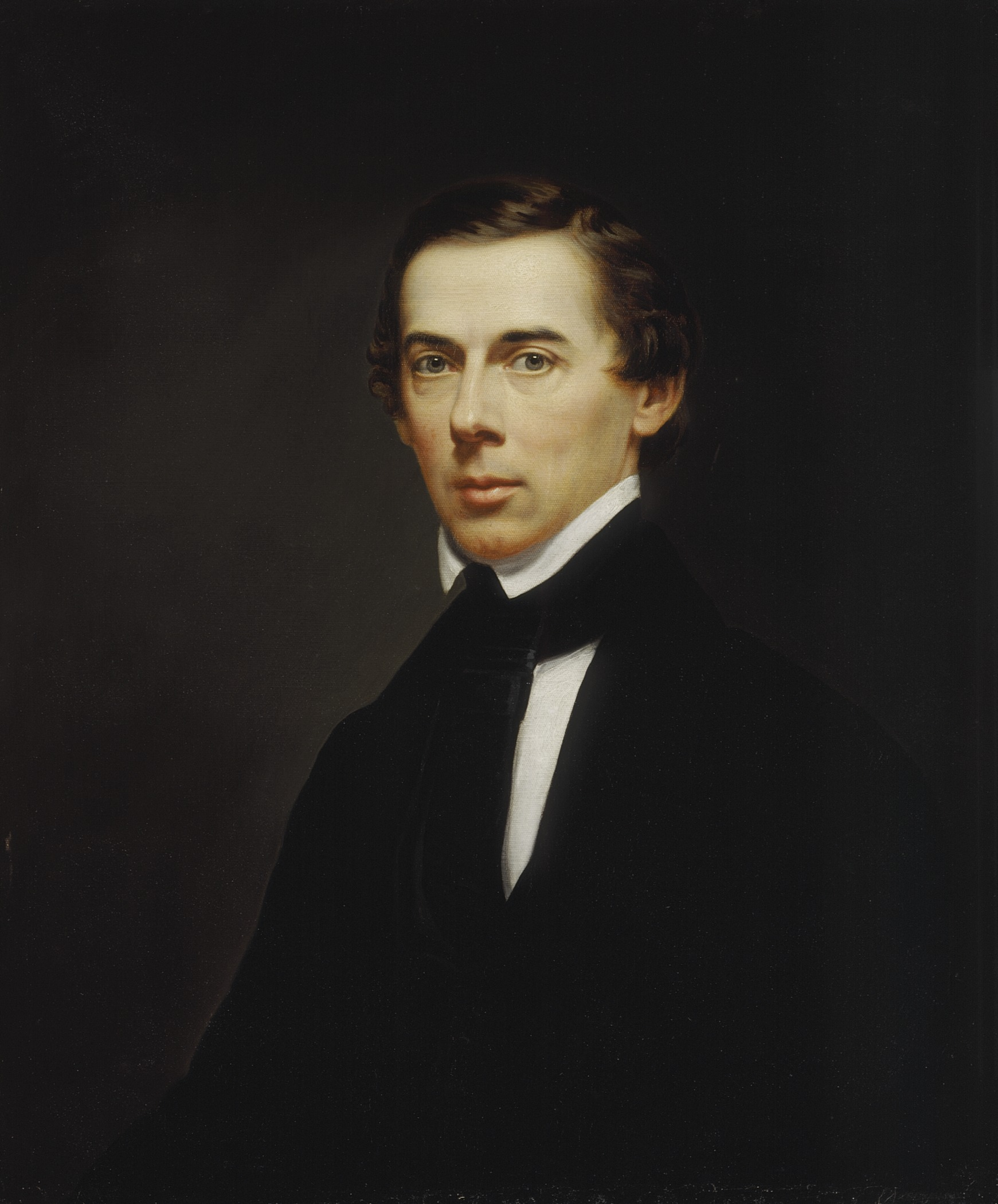
Self-portrait (1849)

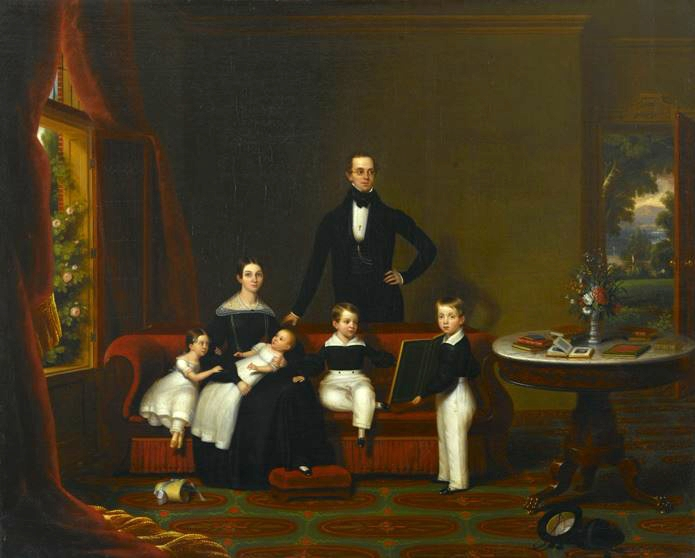
Family Group

Frederick Randolph Spencer (7 June 1806, Lenox, New York - 3 April 1875, Wampsville, New York) was an American portrait painter.

== Biography ==
His father, General Ichabod Smith Spencer (1780–1857), was a lawyer and the first postmaster of Canastota. At the age of fifteen, he became interested in art after seeing an exhibition of portraits by Ezra Ames. In 1822, he was enrolled at the Middleboro Academy in Utica, where he made his first attempts at portrait painting. He attracted the attention of, and received some informal lessons from, William Dunlap, who was holding an exhibition there.

Three years later, he convinced his father to let him go to New York, where he made sketches of the casts at the American Academy of the Fine Arts and took some lessons from its president, John Trumbull, who was impressed with his work. He then returned home and became a portrait painter.

After some time in Albany and Utica, he returned to New York and established a studio. By 1832, he was an Academician at the American Academy and served on its board of directors. He was also named a member of the National Academy of Design, and held several positions there until 1850, when he left to devote himself entirely to painting. He participated regularly in exhibitions at the American Academy (which closed in 1841) and the National Academy, until 1853.

By 1858, he had amassed a considerable fortune and retired to a farm in upstate New York, where he lived until his death in 1875, following a brief illness. His wife, Harriet, whom he had married in 1835/36, died four months later.
