= Leland Pond =

- Location within New York Leland Pond (the United States)
- Location: Madison County, New York, United States
- Coordinates: 42°52′35″N 75°34′22″W, 42°52′47″N 75°34′35″W
- Type: Lake
- Basin countries: United States
- Surface area: 52 acres (0.21 km^{2})
- Average depth: 11 feet (3.4 m)
- Max. depth: 51 ft (16 m)
- Shore length^{1}: 2.8 miles (4.5 km)
- Surface elevation: 1,138 ft (347 m)
- Settlements: Pine Woods, New York
- ^{1} Shore length is not a well-defined measure.

Leland Pond consists of Upper Leland Pond and Lower Leland Pond which are connected by a short channel. The Pond is located by Pine Woods, New York. Fish species present in the pond include pumpkinseed sunfish, walleye, smallmouth bass, yellow perch, bluegill, pickerel, rock bass, rainbow trout, and largemouth bass.
