= DeRuyter Central School =

School district in New York, United States

Location
- DeRuyter, NY US-NY United States
- Coordinates: 42°45′27″N 75°53′28″W

District information
- Type: Public
- Grades: UPK-12
- Established: 1799 (first schoolhouse) 1837 (as DeRuyter Institute) 1874 (merged with Cuyler to form DeRuyter Union School and Academy) 1936 (as DeRuyter Central Junior/Senior High School)
- Superintendent: Neal Capone
- Budget: $9,732,611
- NCES District ID: 3608850

Students and staff
- Students: 427
- Teachers: 47
- Staff: 50
- Student–teacher ratio: 9.09
- District mascot: Rocket
- Colors: Maroon and white

Other information
- UPK-5 Principal: Kimberly O'Brien
- 6-12 Principal: Sarah Stack Feinberg
- Sports: Soccer, Cross Country, Track, Baseball, Softball, Golf, Basketball, Volleyball, Swimming (summer program)
- Sports schedule: ScheduleGalaxy
- Schedule: M-F 8-3
- Website: deruytercentral.org

DeRuyter Central School is a public school district located in southwestern Madison County, New York. The school houses grades UPK-12. The current school enrollment is 427 students from the area. The DeRuyter Central School district includes students from DeRuyter, Sheds, Cuyler (in Cortland County), and Lincklaen (in Chenango County).

DeRuyter Central School is a one building public school district for students in Pre-Kindergarten through twelfth grade.

The DCS elementary school has 13 classrooms for students in Pre-Kindergarten through 5th Grades. The middle school serves students in grades sixth through eight, with the high school serving grades nine through twelve.

In addition to the core subjects (English Language Arts, Social Studies, Mathematics, & Science) the district offers a foreign language course in Spanish. DCS also offers various courses in business and the fine arts. In recent years, the school offers high school students an opportunity to earn college credit through Tompkins Cortland Community College.

== Fine Arts ==
DeRuyter has a large band and chorus for the size of the school, with classes beginning in fifth grade. In grades with the classes, the 48% of students are in chorus and 52% of students are in band. The district ensures that no student should have to pay for an instrument if they do not want to own one, and as such provide a variety of instruments (as well as maintenance items) for students to use free of charge.

The band and chorus perform three annual concerts. The first is a Christmas concert held two Thursdays before Christmas. The second is a spring concert held the last Thursday in March. And finally, the third is held in mid-May. The school consistently has a high turnout from the community, with little room to sit at all concerts. In addition, the band performs in the town's annual Memorial Day parade which draws over a thousand in such a rural area. The band typically has around 85 students performing.

In early 2014, the DeRuyter band and chorus received the Support Music Merit Award, being one of only 96 schools in the entire United States to do so. The school repeated this feat in 2015, being only one of 120 schools to earn the award, and one of 32 to earn the award in both years. As described by the Cortland Standard, their fine arts department is "one of the most inclusive, comprehensive, and community-supported in the entire country."

In 2011, the band's director Lisa Stearns was named the second-best director of a high school band or chorus in Madison County, with the best being her husband, Matthew Stearns (who teaches chorus at nearby Chittenango HS).

== Athletics ==
The school is the home of the DeRuyter Rockets. The school has won many athletic titles such as "CCL Co-Champion" for Boys Varsity Soccer in '91-92 and '92-93, "League Champion" for Girls Varsity Volleyball in '91-92, "CCL Co-Champion" for Boys Varsity Basketball in '92-93, "Section III Class D Champion" for Girls Varsity Soccer in '94-95, "Section III Class D Co-Champion" for Girls Varsity Soccer in '95-96. Athletic programs include soccer, cross-country, basketball, volleyball, baseball, softball, track, golf, and cheerleading.

Most recently, the Girls Varsity Volleyball team captured the 2017-18 CCL Tournament Championship.
