= Seventh Day Baptist Church (DeRuyter, New York) =

Historic church in New York, United States

- U.S. National Register of Historic Places
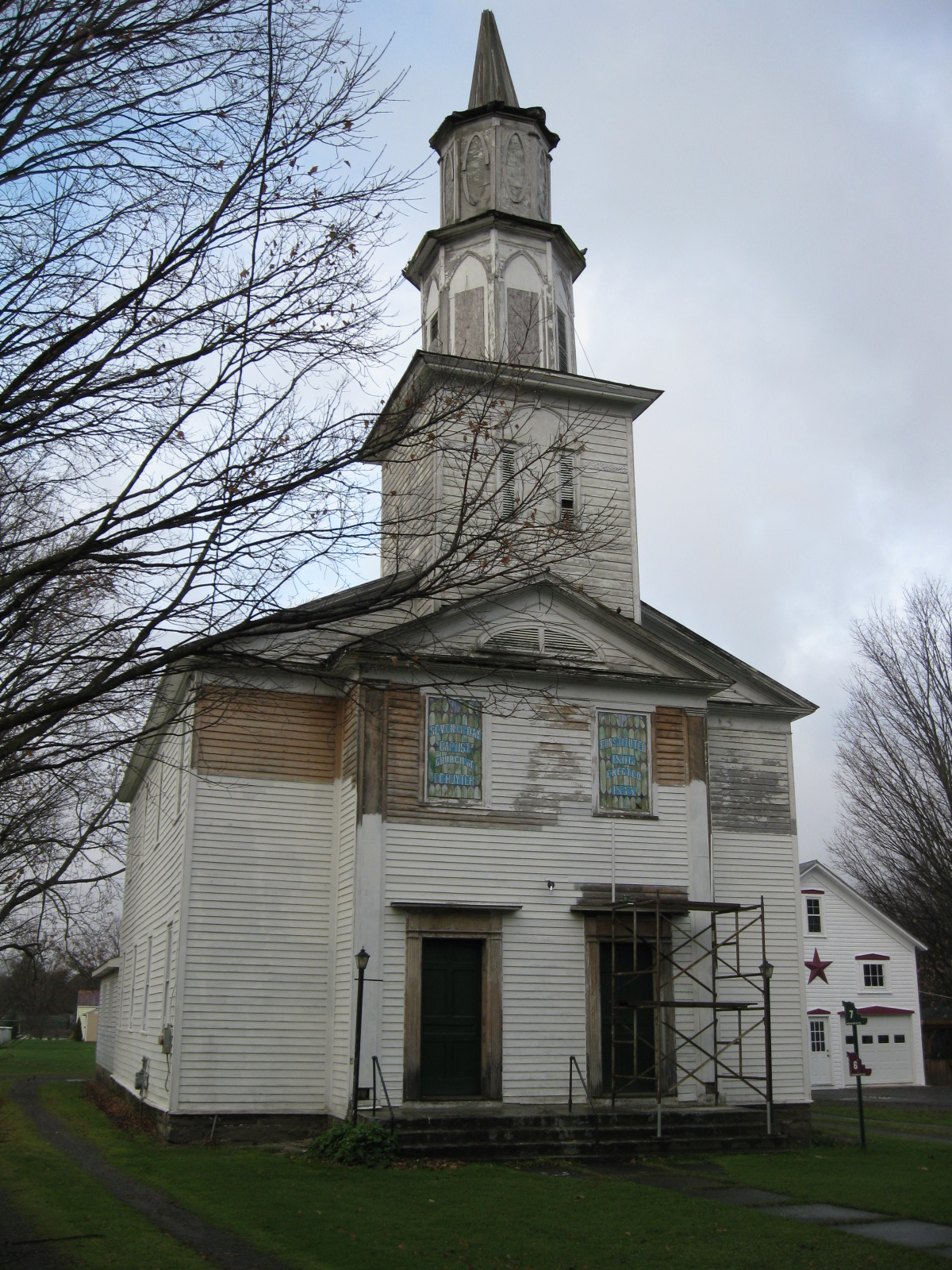
- Seventh Day Baptist Church, DeRuyter, New York, November 2009

- Location within New York Location within the United States
- Location: Utica St., DeRuyter, New York
- Coordinates: 42°45′40″N 75°53′7″W
- Area: 0.4 acres (0.16 ha)
- Built: c. 1835
- Architectural style: Federal
- NRHP reference No.: 05001136
- Added to NRHP: October 5, 2005

Seventh Day Baptist Church is a historic Baptist church located at DeRuyter, Madison County, New York. It was built about 1835 and is a two-story, rectangular frame meeting house, sheathed in clapboard and with a gable roof. It features a small projecting pavilion on the front facade and a multi-stage centered steeple. The church membership decided to close in 1991 and the building was deconsecrated in 2000. The building was subsequently acquired by the Tromptown Historical Society.

It was listed on the National Register of Historic Places in 2005.
