= Mason B. Thomas =

American phytopathologist, botanist, professor, and football coach (1866–1912)

Biographical details
- Born: December 16, 1866; New Woodstock, New York, U.S.
- Died: March 6, 1912 (aged 45); Crawfordsville, Indiana, U.S.

Coaching career (HC unless noted)
- 1891: Wabash

Head coaching record
- Overall: 1–3
- Scientific career
- Education: Cornell University (1890)
- Fields: Phytopathology, botany
- Workplaces: Wabash College
- Author abbrev. (botany): M.B.Thomas

Mason Blanchard Thomas (December 16, 1866 – March 6, 1912) was an American phytopathologist, botanist, professor of both those subjects, and college football coach. He was the sixth head football coach at Wabash College in Crawfordsville, Indiana, serving for one season, in 1891, and compiling a record of 1–3.

Thomas was born on December 16, 1866, in New Woodstock, New York. He graduated from Cornell University in 1890 with Bachelor of Science. Following his graduation, he spent a year as biology fellow at Cornell before going to Wabash College in 1891 as a professor of botany. Thomas was the dean of faculty at Wabash for 12 years, until his death in 1912. He died on March 6, 1912, after a two-week illness with pleurisy, at his home in Crawfordsville.

== Head coaching record ==
Year	Team	Overall	Conference	Standing	Bowl/playoffs
Wabash Little Giants (Indiana Intercollegiate Athletic Association) (1891)
1891	Wabash	1–3	1–3		
Wabash:		1–3	1–3		
Total:		1–3			

== Authored bibliography ==
- Thomas, Mason B.; Dudley, William Russel (1894). A laboratory manual of plant histology. Crawfordsville, Indiana: The Journal Co. doi:10.5962/bhl.title.1273. LCCN 05029355. OCLC 5331374. S2CID 164178334. S2CID 74441089. Download and torrent at Archive.org
