= Francis Marion Burdick =

American legal writer (1845–1920)

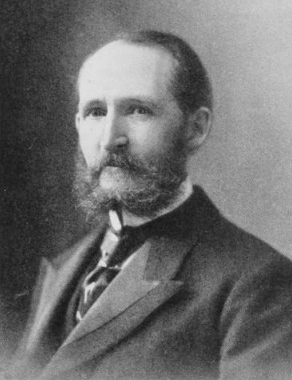

Mayor of Utica, New York
- In office 1882–1883

Personal details
- Born: August 1, 1845 De Ruyter, New York, US
- Died: June 3, 1920 (aged 74) De Ruyter, New York, US
- Spouse: Sarah Underhill (m. 1875)
- Children: 4
- Education: Hamilton College
- Occupation: Jurist, politician

Francis Marion Burdick LL.D. (1845–1920) was an American legal scholar.

== Personal life ==
Francis Marion Burdick was born at De Ruyter, New York on August 1, 1845. His parents were Albert G. Burdick and Eunetia Yale Wheeler Burdick.

On June 8, 1875, he married Sarah Underhill Kellogg, the daughter of Charles C. Kellogg, who founded a Utica lumber company.

Francis and Sarah were Presbyterians. They had a son, Charles (1883–1940), who graduated from Columbia Law School in 1908 and became a professor of law at Cornell. They also had three daughters: Anna (1877–1960), Katherine (1879–1963), and Flora.

On June 3, 1920, Francis Marion Burdick died at his home in De Ruyter while working in his garden. He had remained academically active up to his death.

== Early career ==
He attended the De Ruyter Institute and Oneida Conference Seminary in Cazenovia, and went on to study at Hamilton College with Professor Theodore Dwight. In 1869, he graduated from Hamilton. He briefly taught Greek at Whitestone Seminary and—though personally a Democrat— he wrote editorials for the Utica Morning Herald, a Republican newspaper, before returning to Hamilton. In 1872, he graduated from the law department.

Upon receiving his law degree in 1872, he joined the firm of Beardsley, Burdick and Beardsley in Utica, N. Y. The Citizens Party asked him to run for mayor, and he was elected and held office 1882–1883.

== Later career ==
Soon after Burdick was elected mayor, Theodore Dwight retired from Hamilton, and Burdick became his successor in the Maynard King professorship of law and history.

When Cornell University opened its college of law in 1887, Burdick was among the first faculty members.

In 1895, Hamilton gave him the degree of Doctor of Laws.

In 1891, he was appointed as a law professor at Columbia University. The following year, after the death of the school's founder, Theodore Dwight, he became the first professor to hold the chair named after Dwight; he held it from December 5, 1892–June 30, 1916. Along with George W. Kirchwey, he retired from the faculty of Columbia Law School in 1916, each having completed 25 years. The Dwight Professorship then passed to Charles T. Terry, who held it until 1922.

From 1907 until his death, he was a Commissioner on Uniform Laws representing the State of New York.

He was a member of the Committee of Fourteen in New York City.

== Works ==
Besides contributing extensively to legal periodicals he published:

- Cases on Torts (1895)
- The Law of Sales (third edition, 1913)
- Cases on Sales (second edition, 1901)
- The Law of Torts (1905, second edition, 1908)
- Law of Partnership (second edition, 1906)
- The Essentials of Business Law (1908)
