= Wampsville, New York =

- Village
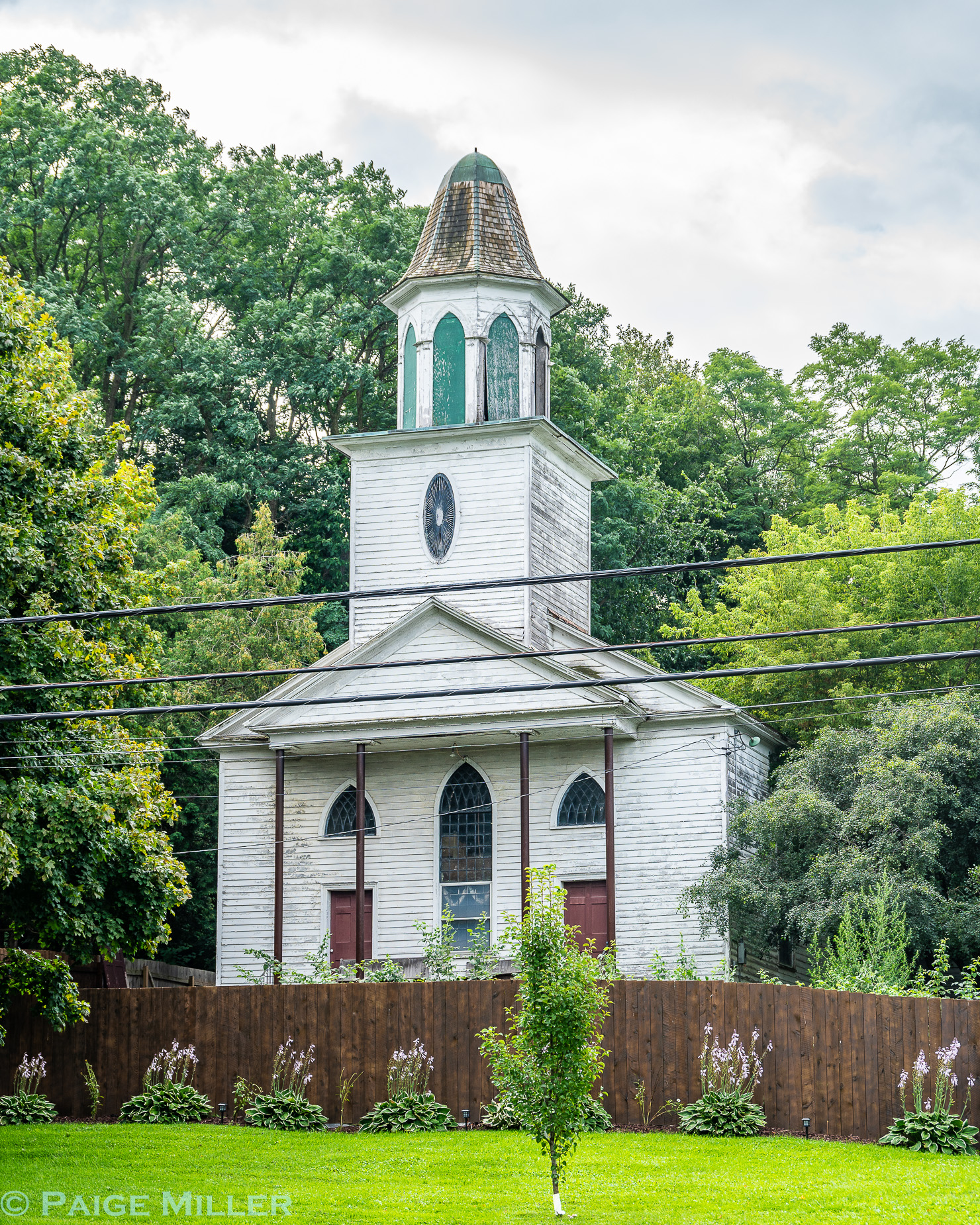
- Wampsville Presbyterian Church

- Location within New York Location within the United States
- Coordinates: 43°4′53″N 75°42′29″W
- Country: United States
- State: New York
- County: Madison
- Town: Lenox

Area
  - Total: 1.03 sq mi (2.67 km^{2})
  - Land: 1.02 sq mi (2.65 km^{2})
  - Water: 0.0077 sq mi (0.02 km^{2})
- Elevation: 482 ft (147 m)

Population (2020)
  - Total: 573
  - Density: 560/sq mi (216/km^{2})
- Time zone: UTC-5 (Eastern (EST))
  - Summer (DST): UTC-4 (EDT)
- ZIP Codes: 13163 (Wampsville); 13032 (Canastota)
- Area code: 315
- FIPS code: 36-78113
- GNIS feature ID: 0968750
- Website: www.wampsvillecny.org

Wampsville is a village within the town of Lenox in Madison County, New York, United States. It is the county seat of Madison County. The population was 573 as of the 2020 census.

== History ==
The village was founded by Johann Myndert Wemple (1766–1837) and was formerly called "Wempsville".

Wampsville was chosen as the seat of Madison County because neighboring Oneida, to the east, and Canastota to the west both wanted the distinction and could not reach a resolution. The county courthouse faces north so that it does not face either locality.

== Geography ==
Wampsville is located in northern Madison County at 43°4′53″N 75°42′29″W (43.081507, −75.708041). It is in the southeast corner of the town of Lenox and is bordered to the east by the city of Oneida. New York State Route 5 passes through the village as Genesee Street, leading east 3 miles (5 km) to Main Street in the southern part of Oneida and west 2 miles (3 km) to the southern part of Canastota. The Erie Canal, now a state park, runs along the northern border of Wampsville.

According to the U.S. Census Bureau, the village has a total area of 1.0 square mile (2.6 km^{2}), all land.

== Demographics ==
Historical population
Census	Pop.	Note	%±
1910	212		—
1920	276		30.2%
1930	280		1.4%
1940	282		0.7%
1950	379		34.4%
1960	564		48.8%
1970	586		3.9%
1980	569		−2.9%
1990	501		−12.0%
2000	561		12.0%
2010	543		−3.2%
2020	573		5.5%
U.S. Decennial Census

As of the census of 2000, there were 561 people, 204 households, and 147 families residing in the village. The population density was 554.3 inhabitants per square mile (214.0/km^{2}). There were 211 housing units at an average density of 208.5 per square mile (80.5/km^{2}). The racial makeup of the village was 96.08% White, 0.18% African American, 0.71% Native American, 0.36% Asian, 0.18% Pacific Islander, 0.36% from other races, and 2.14% from two or more races. Hispanic or Latino of any race were 1.60% of the population.

There were 204 households, out of which 38.2% had children under the age of 18 living with them, 60.8% were married couples living together, 8.8% had a female householder with no husband present, and 27.5% were non-families. 20.1% of all households were made up of individuals, and 10.8% had someone living alone who was 65 years of age or older. The average household size was 2.75 and the average family size was 3.22.

In the village, the population was spread out, with 31.6% under the age of 18, 5.9% from 18 to 24, 30.8% from 25 to 44, 19.4% from 45 to 64, and 12.3% who were 65 years of age or older. The median age was 35 years. For every 100 females, there were 103.3 males. For every 100 females age 18 and over, there were 93.0 males.

The median income for a household in the village was $39,063, and the median income for a family was $42,679. Males had a median income of $35,809 versus $25,938 for females. The per capita income for the village was $16,636. About 5.4% of families and 4.3% of the population were below the poverty line, including 3.7% of those under age 18 and none of those age 65 or over.

== Notable people ==
- Milton De Lano, former US Congressman
- Pierce Downer, founder of Downers Grove, Illinois
- Frederick Randolph Spencer, American portrait painter, lived and died here
