= DeRuyter, New York =

- Town
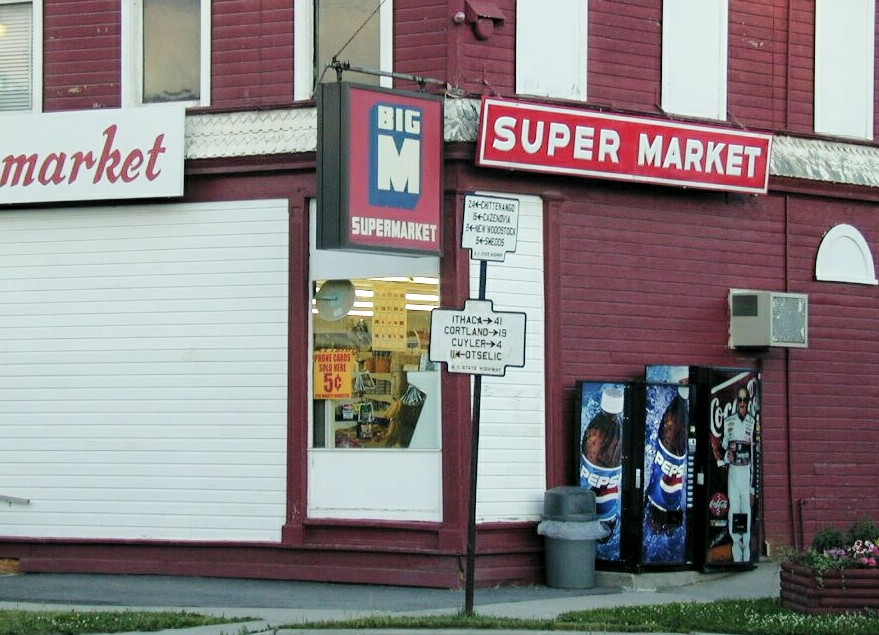
- Old N.Y. State Highway signs at the corner of Utica and Cortland streets (NYS Rt. 13), July 2001

- Location within New York Location within the United States
- Coordinates: 42°45′N 75°53′W
- Country: United States
- State: New York
- County: Madison

Government
  - Type: Town council
  - Town Supervisor: Rex Vosburg (R)
  - Town council: Members: • Edwin B. Coon (R); • Robert G. Jones (R); • Cedric M. Barnes, Jr. (R); • James Tiffany (R)

Area
  - Total: 31.24 sq mi (80.90 km^{2})
  - Land: 30.41 sq mi (78.75 km^{2})
  - Water: 0.83 sq mi (2.15 km^{2})

Population (2020)
  - Total: 1,276
  - Density: 42/sq mi (16/km^{2})
- Time zone: UTC-5 (Eastern (EST))
  - Summer (DST): UTC-4 (EDT)
- ZIP codes: 13052 (De Ruyter); 13122 (New Woodstock); 13072 (Georgetown)
- Area code: 315
- FIPS code: 36-053-20401
- GNIS feature ID: 978900
- Website: www.deruyternygov.us

DeRuyter /dəˈraɪtər/ is a town in Madison County, New York, United States. The population was 1,276 at the 2020 census, down from 1,589 in 2010. The town is named after Michiel Adriaenszoon de Ruyter, a famous admiral in the Dutch navy. The name de Ruyter (de Ruĳter) means "the Rider".

The town of DeRuyter has a village in it also called DeRuyter. The town is in the southwestern corner of the county.

== History ==
DeRuyter was one of five towns formed before Madison County was created. It was established by a partition of the town of Cazenovia in 1798. The town is part of a region called "The Gore", a territory created by a surveying error.

Previous to 1795, DeRuyter was included in the town of Whitestown and was part of the "Lincklaen Purchase". "Tromp Township" was the original name given by John Lincklaen, an agent of the Holland Land Company, in honor of a fellow countryman, Admiral Maarten Tromp. The new town of DeRuyter was formed on March 15, 1798. Jan Lincklaen once again named it in honor of a fellow countryman, Admiral Michiel DeRuyter.

The Village of DeRuyter was incorporated in 1833.

Sig Sautelle's Circus wintered and trained in DeRuyter from 1896 to the early 1900s.

The first Four-County Fair (Cortland, Madison, Chenango and Onondaga) was held in DeRuyter in 1908. The first DeRuyter Fireman's Fair was held in 1927.

== Geography ==
The western town line forms a border with Onondaga and Cortland counties. The southern town line is the border of Chenango County. The village of DeRuyter is in the western part of town along the Cortland County line.

New York State Route 13 passes through DeRuyter, leading north to Cazenovia and southwest to Cortland. NY 80 crosses the northeast corner of the town, leading west to Tully and southeast to Sherburne.

According to the U.S. Census Bureau, the town of DeRuyter has a total area of 31.2 square miles (81 km^{2}), of which 30.4 square miles (79 km^{2}) are land and 0.8 square miles (2.1 km^{2}), or 2.66%, are water. The town is drained by the East Branch of the Tioughnioga River and its tributary, the Middle Branch. The East Branch flows southwest to join the West Branch in Cortland and form the Tioughnioga, which continues south to the Chenango River, part of the Susquehanna River watershed. DeRuyter Reservoir (or Tioughnioga Lake) occupies the northwest corner of the town, and flows out at its north end into Limestone Creek, a tributary of Chittenango Creek and part of the Oneida Lake watershed leading eventually to Lake Ontario.

== Demographics ==
Historical population
Census	Pop.	Note	%±
1820	1,214		—
1830	1,447		19.2%
1840	1,799		24.3%
1850	1,931		7.3%
1860	1,817		−5.9%
1870	2,009		10.6%
1880	1,584		−21.2%
1890	1,500		−5.3%
1900	1,410		−6.0%
1910	1,196		−15.2%
1920	1,141		−4.6%
1930	1,047		−8.2%
1940	1,069		2.1%
1950	1,165		9.0%
1960	1,290		10.7%
1970	1,366		5.9%
1980	1,349		−1.2%
1990	1,458		8.1%
2000	1,532		5.1%
2010	1,589		3.7%
2020	1,276		−19.7%
U.S. Decennial Census

As of the census of 2000, there were 1,532 people, 592 households, and 412 families residing in the town. The population density was 50.2 inhabitants per square mile (19.4/km^{2}). There were 867 housing units at an average density of 28.4 per square mile (11.0/km^{2}). The racial makeup of the town was 97.06% White, 1.31% Black or African American, 0.26% Native American, 0.39% Asian, 0.07% from other races, and 0.91% from two or more races. Hispanic or Latino of any race were 0.33% of the population.

There were 592 households, out of which 31.3% had children under the age of 18 living with them, 56.9% were married couples living together, 8.6% had a female householder with no husband present, and 30.4% were non-families. 25.2% of all households were made up of individuals, and 12.5% had someone living alone who was 65 years of age or older. The average household size was 2.59 and the average family size was 3.08.

In the town, the population was spread out, with 27.0% under the age of 18, 6.9% from 18 to 24, 26.7% from 25 to 44, 24.8% from 45 to 64, and 14.6% who were 65 years of age or older. The median age was 38 years. For every 100 females, there were 93.9 males. For every 100 females age 18 and over, there were 93.8 males.

The median income for a household in the town was $34,911, and the median income for a family was $41,417. Males had a median income of $30,909 versus $22,063 for females. The per capita income for the town was $17,339. About 7.3% of families and 11.8% of the population were below the poverty line, including 12.7% of those under age 18 and 10.9% of those age 65 or over.

== Communities and locations in the town ==
- DeRuyter – A village located in the southwestern corner of the town on Route 13.
- DeRuyter Reservoir – A reservoir in the northwestern corner of the town, one of the largest in the area. Although it is a reservoir, it is commonly called "DeRuyter Lake".
- Puckerville – A hamlet in the southwestern corner of the town and northeast of DeRuyter village on Route 13.
- Quaker Settlement or Quaker Basin – A location in the southeastern corner of the town on Route 58 and east of DeRuyter village.
- Sheds – A hamlet in the northeastern corner of the town at Routes 13, 60, and 80.
- Sheds Corners – A hamlet southwest of Sheds on Route 13.

== Education ==
=== Primary and secondary schools ===
==== Public schools ====
The DeRuyter Central School District is located on the eastern edge of the village on Railroad Street. DeRuyter Central School is a public school district located in southwestern Madison County. The school houses grades K-12. The current school enrollment is approximately 380 students from the area. The DeRuyter Central School district includes students from DeRuyter, Sheds, Cuyler (in Cortland County) and Lincklaen (in Chenango County).

== Notable people ==
- Francis Marion Burdick, American legal scholar
- Ezra Cornell, founder of Western Union and Cornell University, relocated as a child to DeRuyter in 1819
- Lyman Gage, U.S. Secretary of the Treasury
