= Georgetown, New York =

- Town
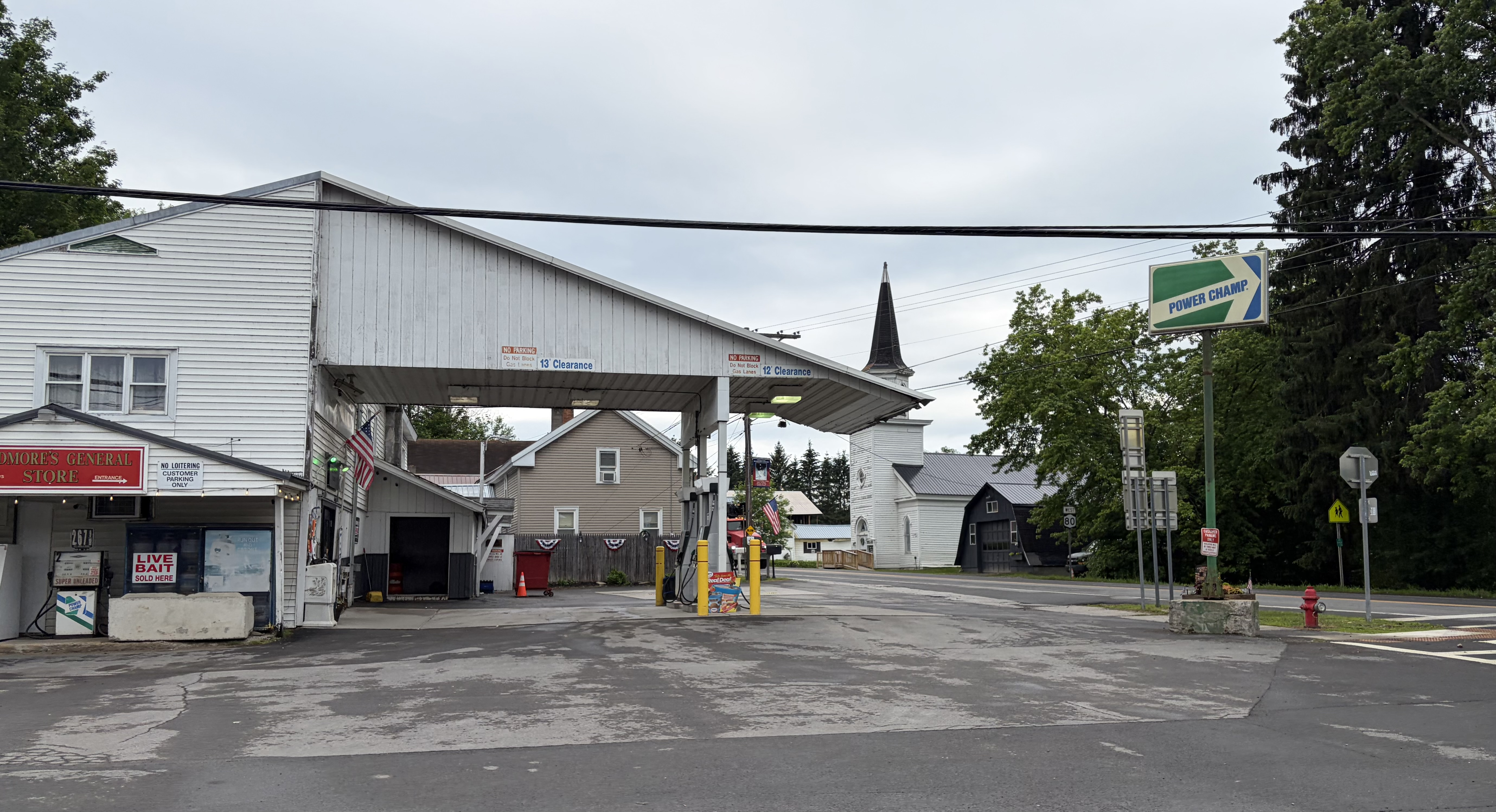
- The intersection of Route 26 and Route 80 in Georgetown

- Location within New York Location within the United States
- Coordinates: 42°47′16″N 75°44′47″W
- Country: United States
- State: New York
- County: Madison

Government
  - Type: Town Council
  - Town Supervisor: Paul Walrod (R)
  - Town Council: Members' List: • Lyle Mason (D); • Charles P. Cuney (R); • Matthew Van Heusen (R); • Bart Chapin ()

Area
  - Total: 40.18 sq mi (104.06 km^{2})
  - Land: 40.08 sq mi (103.80 km^{2})
  - Water: 0.10 sq mi (0.26 km^{2})
- Elevation: 1,453 ft (443 m)

Population (2020)
  - Total: 648
  - Density: 16.17/sq mi (6.24/km^{2})
- Time zone: UTC-5 (Eastern (EST))
  - Summer (DST): UTC-4 (EDT)
- ZIP Codes: 13072 (Georgetown); 13061 (Erieville); 13334 (Eaton); 13332 (Earlville)
- Area code: 315
- FIPS code: 36-053-28695
- GNIS feature ID: 0978995
- Website: Town of Georgetown

Georgetown is a town in Madison County, New York, United States. The population was 648 at the 2020 census, down from 974 in 2010. The town is on the southern border of the county.

== History ==
The town was one of the Twenty Townships, and in 1793 ownership of the tract was patented to Thomas Ludlow Jr. It was first settled in 1803, and for its first years was known as "Slab City". Georgetown was formally organized from part of the town of DeRuyter in 1815.

A reputed French nobleman constructed a house near Georgetown in 1808, on what became known as Muller Hill, before he abandoned the land in 1816. The house burnt down in the early 20th-century, and the land was later developed as a State Forest.

Throughout the 19th century, most of Georgetown's inhabitants worked as farmers; it was connected to the rest of the nation through two railroads: the West Shore and New York and Oswego Midland Railway. The town's population grew to a peak of 1,490 in 1880. In the second half of the century, farming in Central New York entered a period of decline: pressures of industrialization, urbanization encouraged many rural inhabitants to leave the profession behind. Georgetown's population fell to 684 by 1930.

The New York State Department of Corrections operated Camp Georgetown, a minimum-security prison near the town, from 1960 to 2011.

The Spirit House was listed on the National Register of Historic Places in 2006.

== Geography ==
The southern town line is the border of Chenango County. New York State Route 26 crosses the town, leading northeast 16 miles (26 km) to Madison and southwest 36 miles (58 km) to Whitney Point. State Route 80 also crosses the town, joining NY 26 in the southern part of town; it leads west-northwest 16 miles (26 km) to Fabius and southeast 16 miles (26 km) to Sherburne.

According to the U.S. Census Bureau, the town of Georgetown has a total area of 40.2 square miles (104 km^{2}), of which 0.1 square miles (0.26 km^{2}), or 0.25%, are water. The Otselic River flows through the center of the town, running southwest to join the Tioughnioga River at Whitney Point. While most of the town is drained by the Otselic, some of the western side of town drains toward the East Branch of the Tioughnioga, while the southeastern part of town is drained by Lebanon Brook, South Lebanon Brook, and Pleasant Brook, all tributaries of the Chenango River.

== Demographics ==
Historical population
Census	Pop.	Note	%±
1820	824		—
1830	1,094		32.8%
1840	1,130		3.3%
1850	1,411		24.9%
1860	1,476		4.6%
1870	1,423		−3.6%
1880	1,490		4.7%
1890	1,172		−21.3%
1900	998		−14.8%
1910	925		−7.3%
1920	854		−7.7%
1930	684		−19.9%
1940	734		7.3%
1950	616		−16.1%
1960	633		2.8%
1970	816		28.9%
1980	779		−4.5%
1990	932		19.6%
2000	946		1.5%
2010	974		3.0%
2020	648		−33.5%
U.S. Decennial Census

As of the census of 2000, there were 946 people, 249 households, and 195 families residing in the town. The population density was 23.6 inhabitants per square mile (9.1/km^{2}). There were 315 housing units at an average density of 7.9 per square mile (3.1/km^{2}). The racial makeup of the town was 79.81% White, 15.54% African American, 0.42% Native American, 3.59% from other races, and 0.63% from two or more races. Hispanic or Latino of any race were 7.51% of the population.

There were 249 households, out of which 34.9% had children under the age of 18 living with them, 65.5% were married couples living together, 7.6% had a female householder with no husband present, and 21.3% were non-families. 16.5% of all households were made up of individuals, and 7.2% had someone living alone who was 65 years of age or older. The average household size was 2.82 and the average family size was 3.18.

In the town, the population was spread out, with 21.6% under the age of 18, 9.1% from 18 to 24, 40.2% from 25 to 44, 20.9% from 45 to 64, and 8.2% who were 65 years of age or older. The median age was 36 years. For every 100 females, there were 172.6 males. For every 100 females age 18 and over, there were 189.8 males.

The median income for a household in the town was $37,963, and the median income for a family was $38,804. Males had a median income of $21,726 versus $22,000 for females. The per capita income for the town was $11,825. About 7.5% of families and 11.4% of the population were below the poverty line, including 18.9% of those under age 18 and 6.9% of those age 65 or over.

== Communities and locations in Georgetown ==
- Georgetown – The hamlet of Georgetown, at the junction of Routes NY-26 and NY-80. The community was known to locals as "Slab City".
- Georgetown Station – A location in the northeastern part of the town.
- The Otselic River flows through the town, and its tributary Otselic Creek.

== Notable people ==
- Eli Hawks, Wisconsin State Assemblyman and businessman, was born in Georgetown.
