= Lebanon, New York =

Town in New York, United States

- Town
- Location within New York Location within the United States
- Coordinates: 42°47′8″N 75°37′23″W
- Country: United States
- State: New York
- County: Madison

Government
  - Type: Town Council
  - Town Supervisor: Ronda Winn (R)
  - Town Council: Members' List: • Chadwick Nower (R); • Adam Carvell (D); • Marie Morgan (D); • Greg Fuller (D)

Area
  - Total: 43.68 sq mi (113.13 km^{2})
  - Land: 43.34 sq mi (112.26 km^{2})
  - Water: 0.34 sq mi (0.87 km^{2})
- Elevation: 1,348 ft (411 m)

Population (2020)
  - Total: 1,326
  - Density: 30.6/sq mi (11.8/km^{2})
- Time zone: UTC-5 (Eastern (EST))
  - Summer (DST): UTC-4 (EDT)
- ZIP Codes: 13332 (Lebanon); 13334 (Eaton); 13346 (Hamilton); 13464 (Smyrna)
- FIPS code: 36-053-41674
- GNIS feature ID: 0979135
- Website: townoflebanonny.gov

Lebanon is a town on the southern border of Madison County, New York, United States. The population was 1,326 at the 2020 census. The town is believed to be named after Lebanon, Connecticut.

== History ==
Settlement of Lebanon began circa 1791. The town was established in 1807, from part of the town of Hamilton. Many of the early inhabitants were from Connecticut.

The town was founded by General Erastus Cleveland. "When asked for the new town's name, he cried out, alluding to the Bible, 'Ah, as the cedars of Lebanon. The new town of Lebanon.' The name pleased many of them who had trudged long miles from Lebanon, Connecticut, and they believed that the general had suggested the name as a tribute to them."

== Geography ==
The south town line is the border of Chenango County. The village of Hamilton borders the town to the northeast, and the village of Earlville borders the town to the southeast. New York State Route 12B briefly enters the eastern part of the town, connecting the two villages.

According to the U.S. Census Bureau, the town has a total area of 43.7 square miles (113 km^{2}), of which 43.3 square miles (112 km^{2}) are land and 0.3 square miles (0.78 km^{2}), or 0.77%, are water. The Chenango River, a tributary of the Susquehanna River, flows from north to south across the eastern side of the town. Nearly all of the town drains toward the Chenango, with major tributaries in the town including South Lebanon Brook, Lebanon Brook, Stone Mill Brook, Kingsley Brook, and Bradley Brook.

== Demographics ==
Historical population
Census	Pop.	Note	%±
1820	1,940		—
1830	2,249		15.9%
1840	1,794		−20.2%
1850	1,709		−4.7%
1860	1,678		−1.8%
1870	1,559		−7.1%
1880	1,586		1.7%
1890	1,277		−19.5%
1900	1,243		−2.7%
1910	1,079		−13.2%
1920	940		−12.9%
1930	895		−4.8%
1940	914		2.1%
1950	890		−2.6%
1960	880		−1.1%
1970	969		10.1%
1980	1,117		15.3%
1990	1,265		13.2%
2000	1,329		5.1%
2010	1,332		0.2%
2020	1,326		−0.5%

As of the census of 2000, there were 1,329 people, 506 households, and 359 families residing in the town. The population density was 30.6/sq mi (11.8/km^{2}). There were 631 housing units at an average density of 14.5 per square mile (5.6/km^{2}). The racial makeup of the town was 98.65% White, 0.08% African American, 0.45% Native American, 0.30% Asian, 0.00% Pacific Islander, 0.00% from other races, and 0.53% from two or more races. 1.66% of the population were Hispanic or Latino of any race.

There were 506 households, out of which 35.6% had children under the age of 18 living with them, 59.3% were married couples living together, 7.3% had a female householder with no husband present, and 28.9% were non-families. 23.3% of all households were made up of individuals, and 9.7% had someone living alone who was 65 years of age or older. The average household size was 2.63 and the average family size was 3.09.

In the town, the population was spread out, with 27.5% under the age of 18, 7.7% from 18 to 24, 28.3% from 25 to 44, 24.0% from 45 to 64, and 12.6% who were 65 years of age or older. The median age was 37 years. For every 100 females, there were 99.8 males. For every 100 females age 18 and over, there were 94.7 males.

The median income for a household in the town was $34,643, and the median income for a family was $39,038. Males had a median income of $29,205 versus $26,771 for females. The per capita income for the town was $15,690. 13.9% of the population and 9.7% of families were below the poverty line. Out of the total people living in poverty, 20.6% were under the age of 18 and 11.6% were 65 or older.

== Communities and locations in Lebanon ==
- Campbell – A hamlet north of Lebanon Center.
- Kenyon Corners – A location in the northern part of the town.
- Lebanon – The hamlet of Lebanon is in the western part of the town on County Routes 62 and 71. It was originally called "Toad Hollow" and is located next to Stone Mill Brook.
- Lebanon Center – A hamlet east of Lebanon village.
- Lebanon Reservoir – A reservoir located by the hamlet of Campbell.
- Middleport – A hamlet near the eastern town line and Randallsville.
- Randallsville – A hamlet in the eastern part of the town on Route 12B. It was formerly called Smiths Valley.
- South Lebanon – A hamlet south of Lebanon village on Route 71.
