= Sheds, New York =

- Hamlet
- Location within New York Location within the United States
- Coordinates: 42°48′40″N 75°49′49″W
- Country: United States
- State: New York
- County: Madison
- Town: DeRuyter
- Elevation: 1,444 ft (440 m)
- Time zone: UTC-5 (Eastern (EST))
  - Summer (DST): UTC-4 (EDT)
- ZIP Code: 13122 (New Woodstock)
- Area codes: 315 & 680
- GNIS feature ID: 964991

Sheds is a hamlet in the town of DeRuyter, Madison County, New York, United States. The community is located at the intersection of state routes 13 and 80, 8.3 miles (13.4 km) south of Cazenovia. Sheds had a post office until January 23, 1993.
