= New Woodstock, New York =

- Hamlet
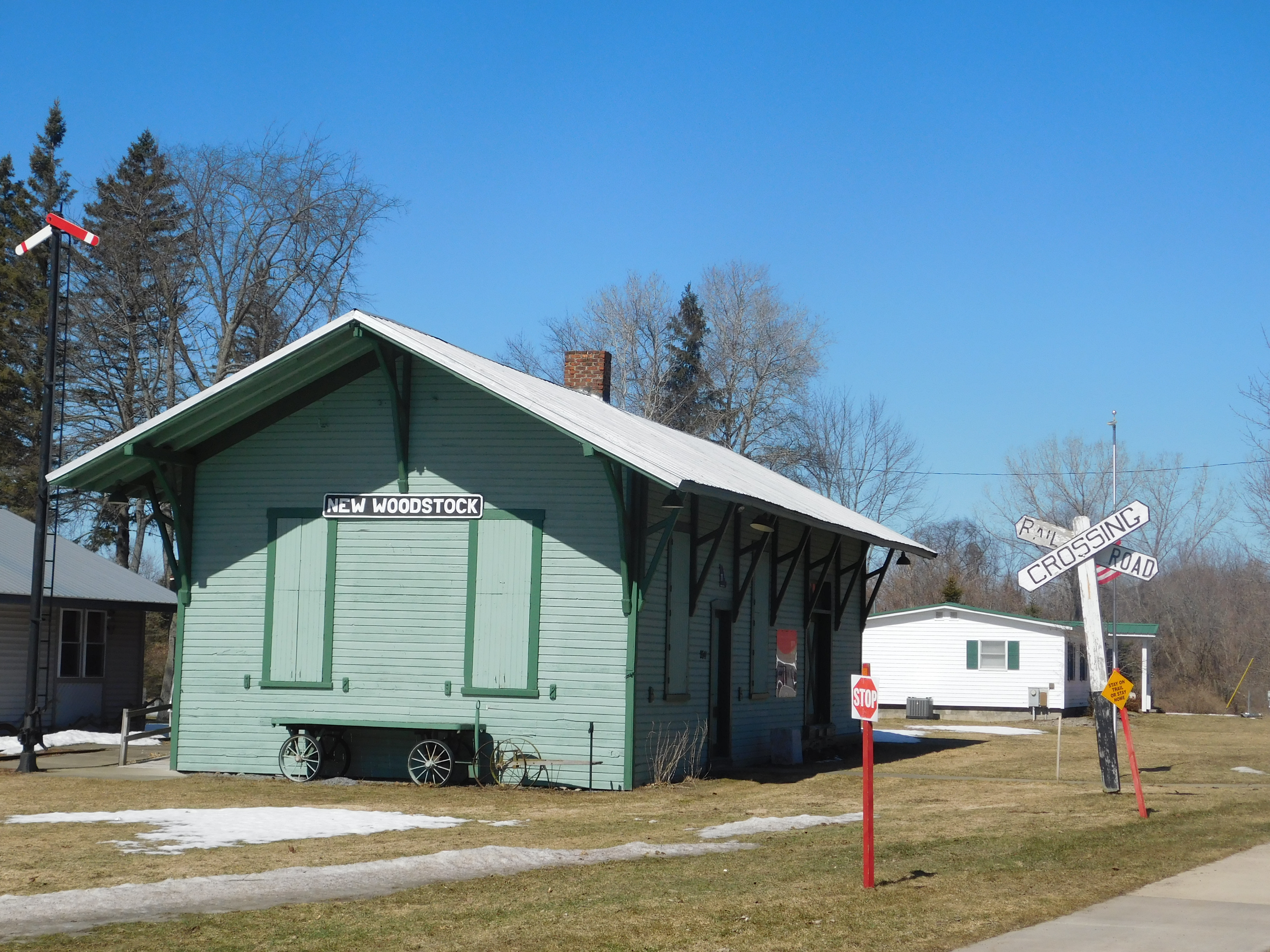
- The former Lehigh Valley Railroad station in New Woodstock

- Location within New York Location within the United States
- Coordinates: 42°50′54″N 75°51′16″W
- Country: United States
- State: New York
- County: Madison
- Town: Cazenovia
- Elevation: 1,306 ft (398 m)
- Time zone: UTC-5 (Eastern (EST))
  - Summer (DST): UTC-4 (EDT)
- ZIP code: 13122
- Area code: 315
- GNIS feature ID: 958468

New Woodstock is a hamlet in the town of Cazenovia, Madison County, New York, United States. The zipcode is: 13122. New Woodstock is approximately 6 miles (9.7 km) south of the village of Cazenovia. The hamlet has a public library.

The hamlet of New Woodstock was populated as early as 1796. Early buildings constructed in the 19th century included a tavern, a Baptist Church, and several shops. The town also was a stop on the Lehigh Valley Railroad. By 1880, its population was estimated at 334. New Woodstock had its own high school into the 1940s, when it was merged with the Cazenovia High School. The high school building was subsequently briefly operated as an elementary school. By 1984, the hamlet contained an estimated 130 homes.

A major attraction near New Woodstock was a ski area, known as "Mystic Mountain", which was operated from 1961 to 1974. Over the next decade the area was sold and reopened several times, before it was finally closed in 1985.

== Notable people ==
- Mason B. Thomas (1866 –1912), phytopathologist and botanist.
