= Lenox, New York =

- Town
- Location within New York Location within the United States
- Coordinates: 43°5′55″N 75°45′20″W
- Country: United States
- State: New York
- County: Madison

Government
  - Type: Town Council
  - Town Supervisor: Meghan Coe-Samsel (R)
  - Town Council: Members' List: • Wesley Hood (R); • Richard Wimmer (R); • John R. Hadyk (R); • Thomas Bush (R)

Area
  - Total: 36.29 sq mi (93.99 km^{2})
  - Land: 36.27 sq mi (93.93 km^{2})
  - Water: 0.023 sq mi (0.06 km^{2})
- Elevation: 390 ft (119 m)

Population (2020)
  - Total: 8,768
  - Density: 241.8/sq mi (93.35/km^{2})
- Time zone: UTC-5 (Eastern (EST))
  - Summer (DST): UTC-4 (EDT)
- ZIP Codes: 13032 (Canastota); 13163 (Wampsville)
- FIPS code: 36–053–41905
- GNIS feature ID: 0979139
- Website: www.lenoxny.gov

Lenox is a town in Madison County, New York, United States. The population was 8,768 as of the 2020 census.

The town is on the county's northern border and is west of the city of Oneida. The International Boxing Hall of Fame is in the town.

== History ==
The town was formed on March 3, 1809, from the town of Sullivan. 5000 acres of the town's land was later partitioned off to form the town of Stockbridge.

Some novels of Walter D. Edmonds characterize life in the area at the time of the Erie Canal construction.

The village of New Lenox, Illinois, is named in honor of Lenox.

== Geography ==
The northern town line, defined by the south shore of Oneida Lake and by Oneida Creek, is the Madison County border with Oneida County. The village of Canastota is in the southern part of the town and contains half of the town's population. The village of Wampsville is in the southeast corner of the town. Lenox is bordered to the east by the city of Oneida.

The New York State Thruway (Interstate 90) crosses the town, with an exit (34) at Canastota. The Thruway leads west 20 miles (32 km) to Syracuse and east 28 miles (45 km) to Utica. New York State Route 5 passes through the southern part of the town, running roughly parallel to the Thruway. Route 5 leads east 5 miles (8 km) into Oneida and west 6 miles (10 km) to Chittenango. State Route 13 follows Route 5 between Chittenango and Canastota, then turns north to pass through the center of Canastota and lead 10 miles (16 km) to Sylvan Beach on Oneida Lake. State Route 31 runs along the northern edge of the town, close to the shore of Oneida Lake. It leads east 9 miles (14 km) to Verona and west 11 miles (18 km) to Bridgeport.

The Erie Canal crosses the town from east to west, passing through Canastota village but with a portion filled in at the village center.

According to the U.S. Census Bureau, the town of Lenox has a total area of 36.3 square miles (94 km^{2}), of which 0.02 square miles (0.05 km^{2}), or 0.06%, are water.

== Demographics ==
Historical population
Census	Pop.	Note	%±
1820	3,360		—
1830	5,039		50.0%
1840	5,440		8.0%
1850	7,507		38.0%
1860	8,024		6.9%
1870	9,816		22.3%
1880	10,246		4.4%
1890	6,732		−34.3%
1900	4,679		−30.5%
1910	4,851		3.7%
1920	5,536		14.1%
1930	5,887		6.3%
1940	5,770		−2.0%
1950	6,515		12.9%
1960	7,729		18.6%
1970	8,871		14.8%
1980	8,539		−3.7%
1990	8,621		1.0%
2000	8,665		0.5%
2010	9,122		5.3%
2020	8,768		−3.9%
U.S. Decennial Census

As of the census of 2000, there were 8,665 people, 3,485 households, and 2,359 families residing in the town. The population density was 238.0 inhabitants per square mile (91.9/km^{2}). There were 3,877 housing units at an average density of 106.5 per square mile (41.1/km^{2}). The racial makeup of the town was 97.66% White, 0.66% African American, 0.46% Native American, 0.24% Asian, 0.01% Pacific Islander, 0.24% from other races, and 0.73% from two or more races. Hispanic or Latino of any race were 0.87% of the population.

There were 3,485 households, out of which 31.2% had children under the age of 18 living with them, 52.4% were married couples living together, 10.2% had a female householder with no husband present, and 32.3% were non-families. 26.7% of all households were made up of individuals, and 13.1% had someone living alone who was 65 years of age or older. The average household size was 2.48 and the average family size was 2.99.

In the town, the population was spread out, with 25.7% under the age of 18, 6.6% from 18 to 24, 29.4% from 25 to 44, 23.5% from 45 to 64, and 14.8% who were 65 years of age or older. The median age was 38 years. For every 100 females, there were 93.8 males. For every 100 females age 18 and over, there were 92.5 males.

The median income for a household in the town was $38,491, and the median income for a family was $46,458. Males had a median income of $34,602 versus $24,922 for females. The per capita income for the town was $17,398. About 6.5% of families and 10.6% of the population were below the poverty line, including 13.4% of those under age 18 and 14.5% of those age 65 or over.

== Communities and locations in Lenox ==
- Campbells Corners – A hamlet in the northwestern part of the town.
- Canastota – An incorporated village in the southern part of the town.
- Lenox – The hamlet of Lenox, at the southern town line below Wampsville, mostly within the neighboring town of Lincoln.
- Lenox Basin – A location along the Erie Canal east of Canastota.
- Messenger Bay – A hamlet near the western town line by the shore of Oneida Lake on Route 31.
- Oneida Lake Beach East – A hamlet on the shore of Oneida Lake, east of Messenger Bay.
- Oneida Valley – A location near the eastern town line.
- Quality Hill – A hamlet southwest of Canastota, located on Route 5.
- South Bay – A bay of Oneida Lake.
- South Bay – A hamlet on the shore of Oneida Lake by South Bay, located on Route 31.
- Union Corners – A location northeast of Canastota.
- Walkers Corners – A hamlet southeast of Whitelaw.
- Wampsville – The village of Wampsville is the county seat. It is located near the eastern town line on Route 5.
- Whitelaw – A hamlet south of Messenger Bay.
