= Eaton, New York =

- Town
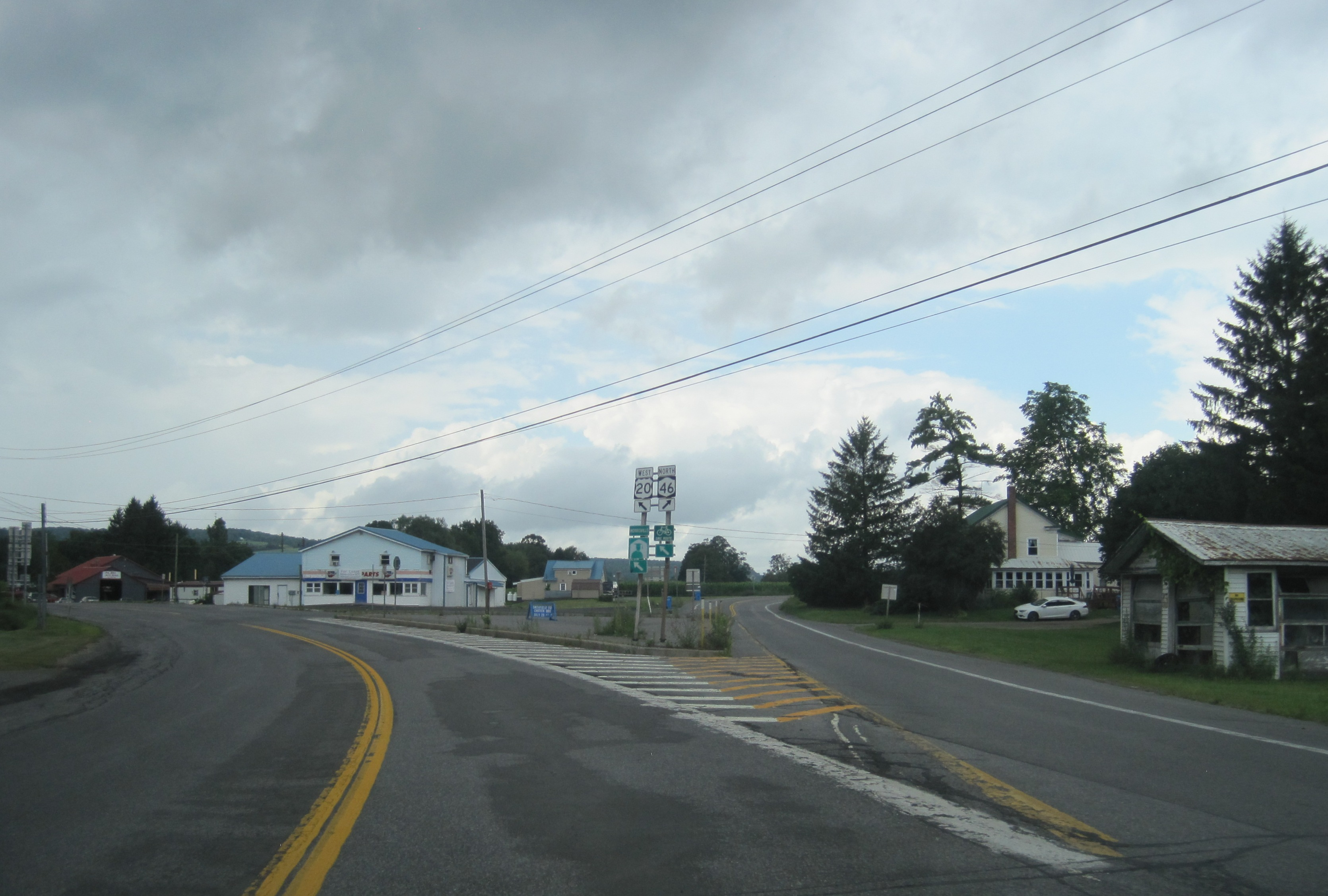
- Hamlet of Pine Woods in Eaton

- Location within New York Location within the United States
- Coordinates: 42°52′N 75°37′W
- Country: United States
- State: New York
- County: Madison

Government
  - Type: Town council
  - Town supervisor: Joseph Wicks (R)
  - Town council: Members' list: • Jeffrey Golley (R); • David Verne (R); • Joseph Wicks (R); • Ross T. Whitford (D)

Area
  - Total: 45.57 sq mi (118.03 km^{2})
  - Land: 44.63 sq mi (115.58 km^{2})
  - Water: 0.95 sq mi (2.45 km^{2})
- Elevation: 1,398 ft (426 m)

Population (2020)
  - Total: 4,284
  - Density: 96/sq mi (37/km^{2})
- Time zone: UTC-5 (Eastern (EST))
  - Summer (DST): UTC-4 (EDT)
- ZIP Codes: 13334 (Eaton); 13408 (Morrisville); 13484 (West Eaton); 13310 (Bouckville); 13409 (Munnsville); 13346 (Hamilton)
- Area code: 315
- FIPS code: 36-053-23305
- GNIS feature ID: 0978923
- Website: www.townofeatonny.gov

Eaton is a town in Madison County, New York, United States. The population was 4,284 at the 2020 census, down from 5,255 in 2010.

== History ==
The area where Eaton is situated was the principal location of the Oneida people, a sub-group of the Iroquois who allied themselves with the colonial forces during the American Revolution. Euro-American settlement began around 1792. The town of Eaton was formed in 1807 from the town of Hamilton. Eaton is named for William Eaton, a Revolutionary officer and commander of the United States military forces in Tripoli.

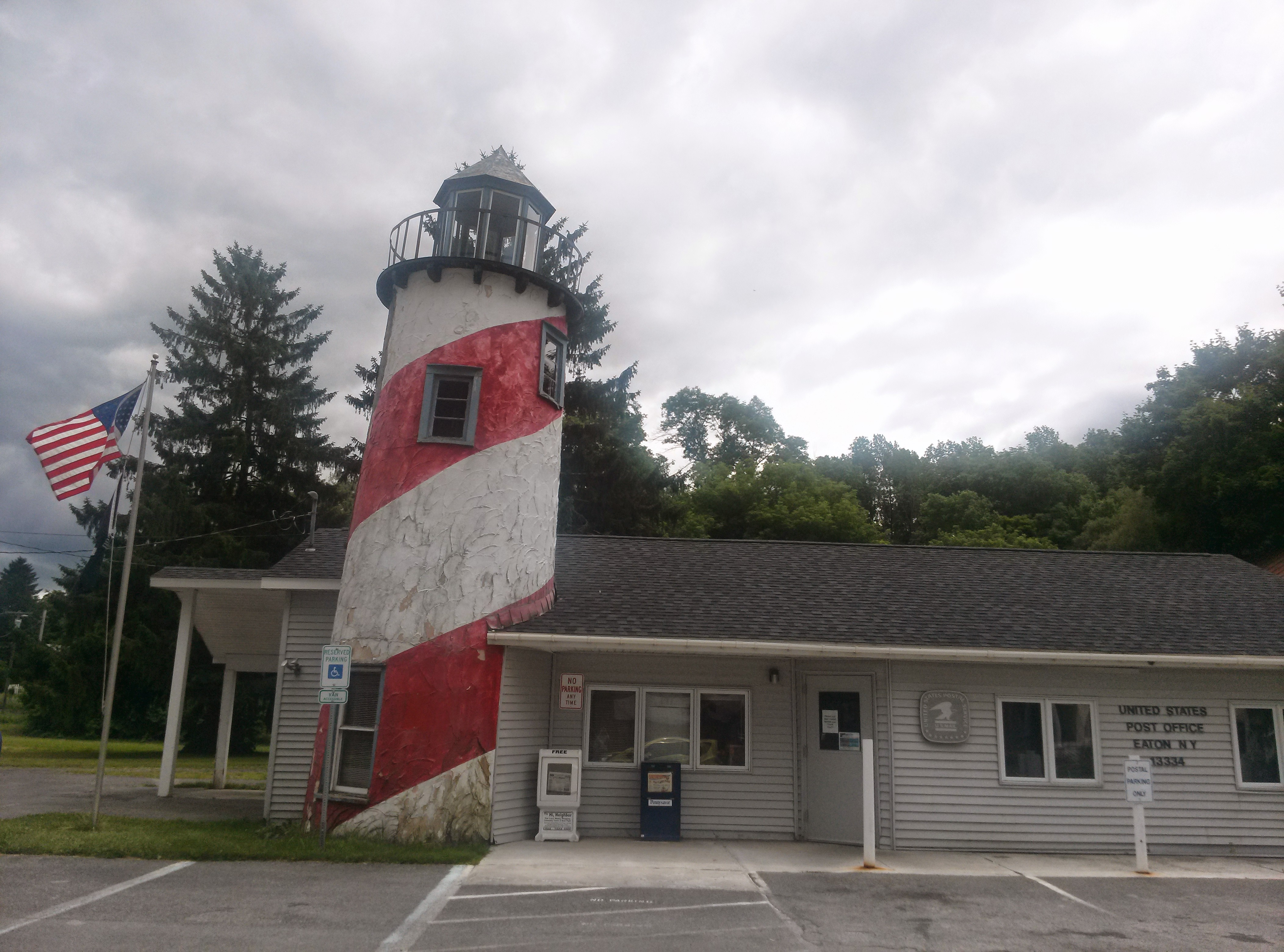
The design of the Eaton post office mimics a lighthouse, a relic of the building's earlier life as a Tower gas station.

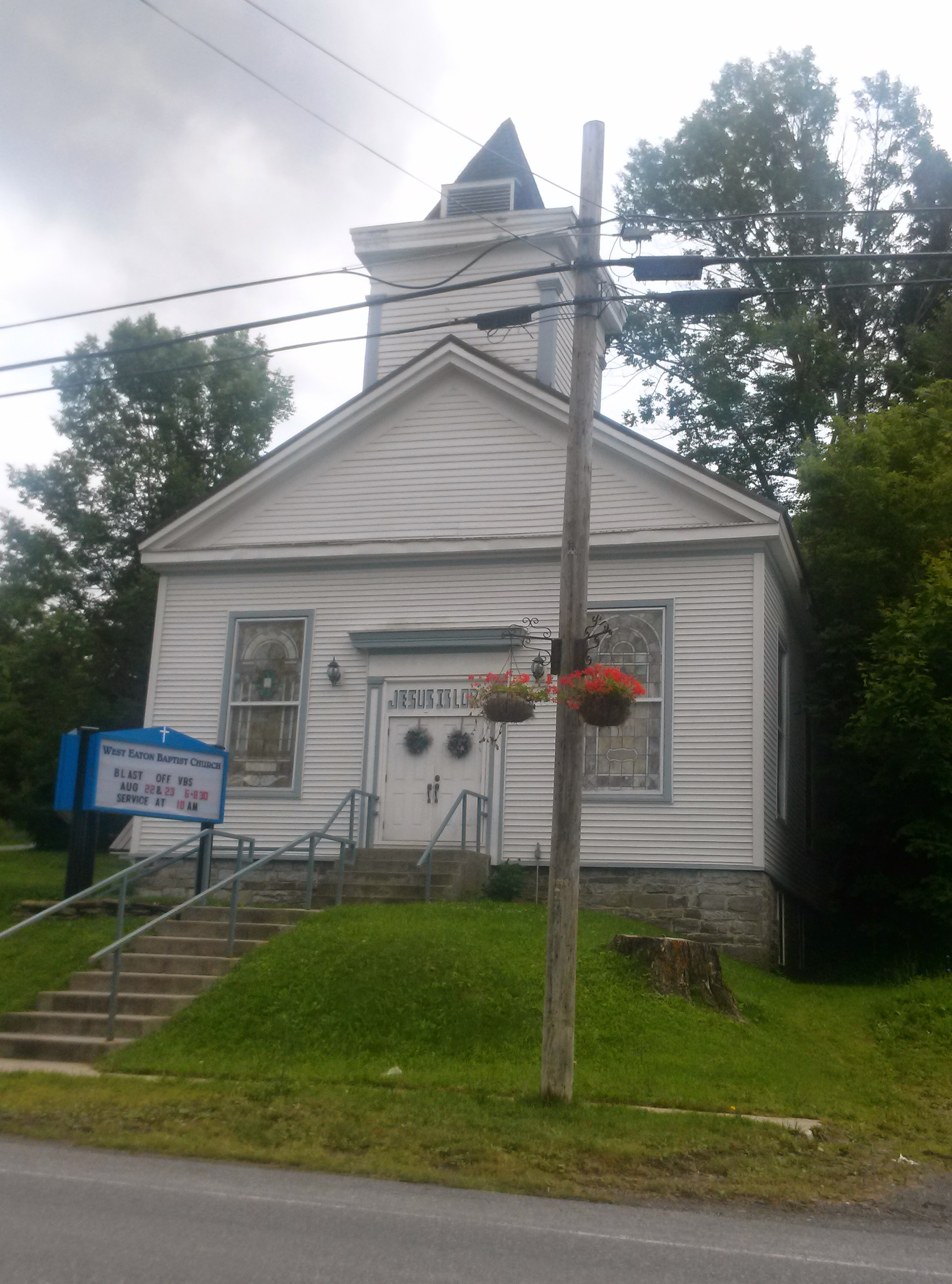
West Eaton Baptist Church

== Geography ==
Eaton is in the south-central part of the Madison County. US Route 20 passes across the northern part of the town, through Morrisville, the largest community in the town. Route 20 leads east 7 miles (11 km) to Madison and west 11 miles (18 km) to Cazenovia. New York State Route 26 crosses the southern portion of the town, passing through the hamlets of Eaton and West Eaton. Route 26 leads east into Madison and southwest 10 miles (16 km) to Georgetown. Part of the village of Hamilton is in the southeast part of Eaton.

Eaton is centered at 42.850 degrees north latitude, 75.612 degrees west longitude. The town contains the geographic center of the state (near Pratts Hollow). The Chenango River, a south-flowing tributary of the Susquehanna River, rises in the town. The northeast part of town is drained by Blue Creek, a north-flowing tributary of Oneida Creek, part of the Oswego River watershed flowing to Lake Ontario.

According to the U.S. Census Bureau, the town has a total area of 45.57 square miles (118.0 km^{2}), of which 44.63 square miles (115.6 km^{2}) are land and 0.94 square miles (2.4 km^{2}), or 2.07%, are water.

== Demographics ==
Historical population
Census	Pop.	Note	%±
1820	3,021		—
1830	3,558		17.8%
1840	3,409		−4.2%
1850	3,944		15.7%
1860	3,871		−1.9%
1870	3,690		−4.7%
1880	3,799		3.0%
1890	3,121		−17.8%
1900	2,705		−13.3%
1910	2,417		−10.6%
1920	2,223		−8.0%
1930	2,168		−2.5%
1940	2,245		3.6%
1950	2,854		27.1%
1960	3,196		12.0%
1970	4,458		39.5%
1980	5,182		16.2%
1990	5,362		3.5%
2000	4,826		−10.0%
2010	5,255		8.9%
2020	4,284		−18.5%
U.S. Decennial Census

As of the census of 2000, there were 4,826 people, 1,358 households, and 935 families residing in the town. The population density was 107.9 inhabitants per square mile (41.7/km^{2}). There were 1,798 housing units at an average density of 40.2 per square mile (15.5/km^{2}). The racial makeup of the town was 90.41% White, 6.55% African American, 0.46% Native American, 1.06% Asian, 0.46% from other races, and 1.08% from two or more races. Hispanic or Latino of any race were 1.99% of the population.

There were 1,358 households, out of which 33.2% had children under the age of 18 living with them, 53.3% were married couples living together, 10.4% had a female householder with no husband present, and 31.1% were non-families. 23.3% of all households were made up of individuals, and 9.6% had someone living alone who was 65 years of age or older. The average household size was 2.58 and the average family size was 3.06.

In the town, the population was spread out, with 20.0% under the age of 18, 30.7% from 18 to 24, 20.8% from 25 to 44, 17.0% from 45 to 64, and 11.6% who were 65 years of age or older. The median age was 24 years. For every 100 females, there were 103.6 males. For every 100 females age 18 and over, there were 99.0 males.

The median income for a household in the town was $36,229, and the median income for a family was $39,643. Males had a median income of $30,417 versus $23,107 for females. The per capita income for the town was $14,538. About 6.0% of families and 9.5% of the population were below the poverty line, including 12.6% of those under age 18 and 2.1% of those age 65 or over.

== Communities and other locations in Eaton ==
- Davis Corners – A location by the northern town line.
- Eagleville – A hamlet south of Morrisville.
- Eaton – The hamlet of Eaton in the southern part of the town on Route 26, south of Morrisville.
- Eaton Reservoir – A reservoir partly in the southwest part of the town.
- Eaton Station – A location northeast of Eaton village.
- Gills Corners – A location in the northeastern corner of the town.
- Leland Pond – Two ponds separated by a short channel located south of the hamlet of Pine Woods.
- Morrisville – Village of Morrisville is the location of Morrisville State College, the Morrisville Equine Center, and the Morrisville Fish Hatchery. Morrisville is in the northwestern part of the town.
- Morrisville Station – A hamlet east of Morrisville on Route 20.
- Pecksport – A location by the eastern town line.
- Pierceville – A hamlet between Eaton village and West Eaton on Route 26.
- Pine Woods – A hamlet, associated with the Oneida, located on Route 20.
- Pratts – A hamlet in the northeastern part of the town.
- Pratts Hollow – The geographic center of New York is in the northeastern part of the town. Pratts Hollow United Methodist Church marks this point.
- West Eaton – A hamlet in the southwestern part of the town.
- White Corners – A hamlet in the northeastern part of the town.
- Williams Corners – A hamlet west of Morrisville.
