= Madison County, New York =

County in New York, United States

- County
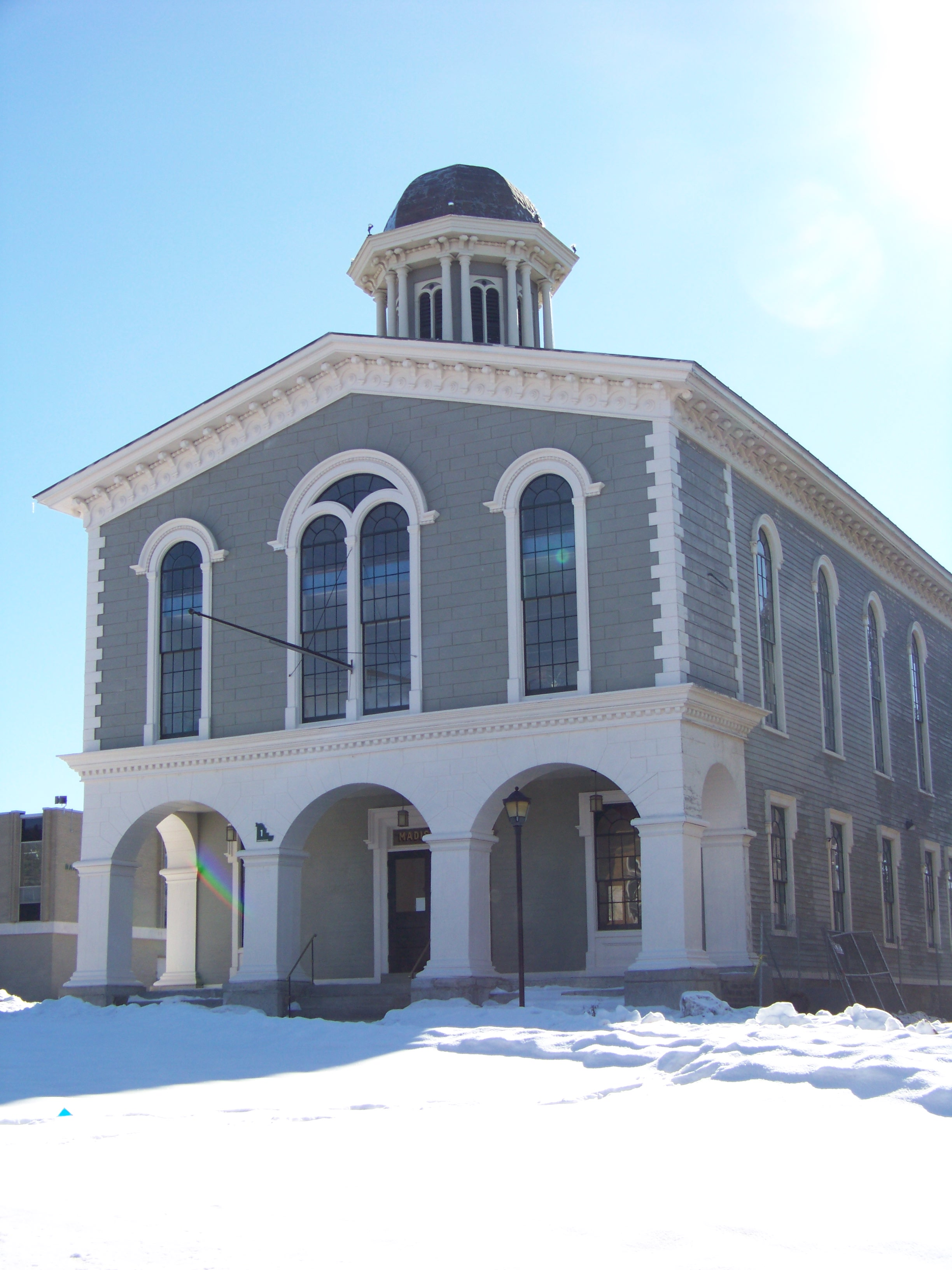
- Old Madison County Courthouse

- Flag Seal

- Location within the U.S. state of New York
- Coordinates: 42°55′N 75°40′W
- Country: United States
- State: New York
- Founded: 1806
- Named for: James Madison
- Seat: Wampsville
- Largest city: Oneida

Area
  - Total: 661 sq mi (1,710 km^{2})
  - Land: 655 sq mi (1,700 km^{2})
  - Water: 6.4 sq mi (17 km^{2}) 1.0%

Population (2020)
  - Total: 68,016
  - Estimate (2025): 67,120 ▼
  - Density: 104/sq mi (40.1/km^{2})
- Time zone: UTC−5 (Eastern)
  - Summer (DST): UTC−4 (EDT)
- Congressional district: 22nd
- Website: www.madisoncounty.ny.gov

Madison County is a county located in the U.S. state of New York. As of the 2020 census, the population was 68,016. Its county seat is Wampsville. The county is named after James Madison, the fourth president of the United States, and was first formed in 1806. The county is part of the Central New York region of the state.

Madison County is part of the Syracuse metropolitan area, and is home to both the International Boxing Hall of Fame and the National Abolition Hall of Fame and Museum.

== History ==
Indigenous peoples had occupied areas around Oneida Lake for thousands of years. The historic Oneida Indian Nation is an Iroquoian-speaking people who emerged as a culture in this area about the fourteenth century and dominated the territory. They are one of the Five Nations who originally comprised the Iroquois Confederacy or Haudenosaunee.

English colonists established counties in eastern present-day New York State in 1683; at the time, the territory of the present Madison County was considered part of Albany County, with the city of Albany located on the Hudson River. This was an enormous county, including the northern part of New York State around Albany as well as all of the present State of Vermont and, in theory, extending westward to the Pacific Ocean. It was claimed by the English but largely occupied by the Oneida, Onondaga, Seneca, Cayuga and Mohawk, who had the territory in the central Mohawk Valley, as well as Mahican near the Hudson River. On July 3, 1766, the English organized Cumberland County, and on March 16, 1770, they organized Gloucester County, both containing territory now included in the state of Vermont.

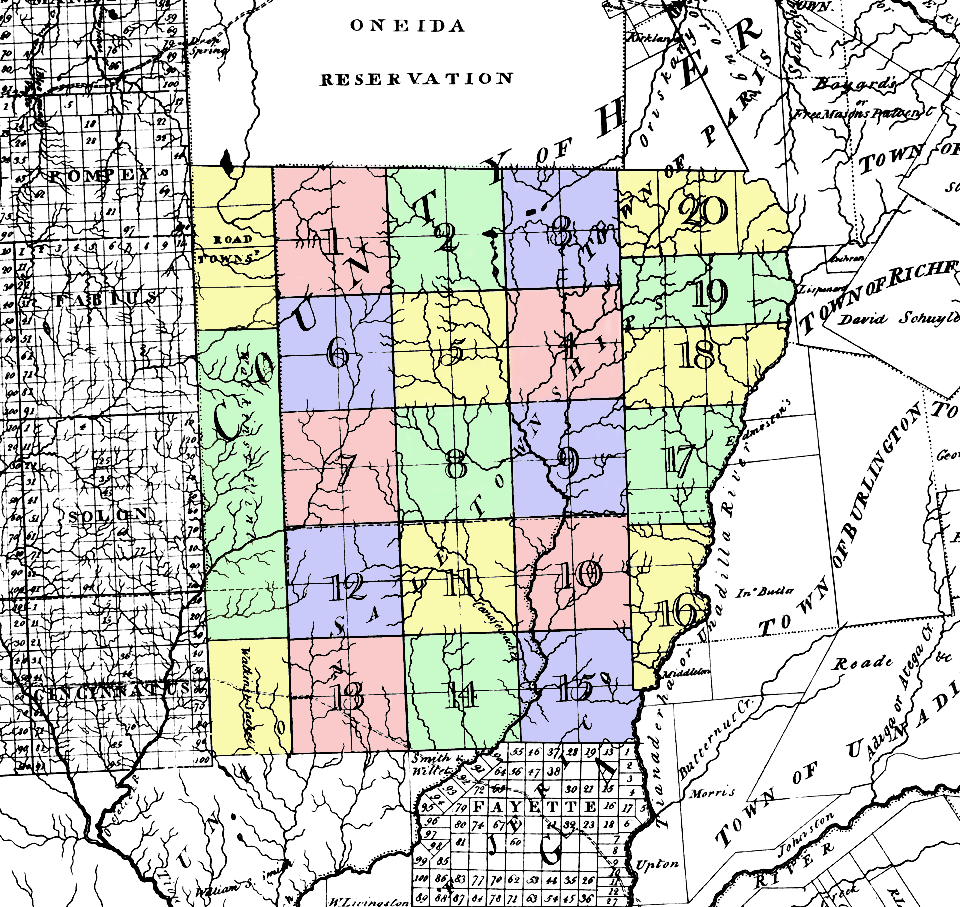
The "Twenty Townships" west of the Unadilla River, conveyed by the Oneida Indians in 1788. Known as "Clinton's Purchase"

On March 12, 1772, what was left of Albany County was split into three parts, one remaining under the name Albany County. One of the other pieces, Tryon County, contained the western portion (and thus, since no western boundary was specified, theoretically still extended west to the Pacific). The eastern boundary of Tryon County was approximately five miles west of the present city of Schenectady, and the county included the western part of the Adirondack Mountains and the area west of the West Branch of the Delaware River. The area then designated as Tryon County includes 37 current counties of New York State. The county was named for William Tryon, the colonial governor of New York.

In the years prior to the outbreak of revolution in 1776, tensions rose in the frontier areas upstate and most of the Loyalists in Tryon County fled to Canada. In 1784, following the peace treaty that ended the American Revolutionary War, New York changed the name of Tryon County to Montgomery County, in honor of the general, Richard Montgomery, who had captured several places in Canada and died attempting to capture the city of Quebec.

As allies of the Patriots, the Oneida Indian Nation was allocated land by the United States in the postwar settlement for a reservation near Oneida Lake, in their traditional homeland. In the postwar treaty, the four Iroquois nations who had been allies of the British were forced to cede their lands; most of their peoples had already migrated to Canada to escape the worst of the fighting on the frontier after Sullivan's Raid. This expedition through Indian country had destroyed dwellings, crops and winter stores; many Iroquois who did not migrate died of starvation that winter.

But settlers were hungry for land, and in 1788 Governor Clinton's representatives persuaded the Oneida to cede some of their territory to the state for sale to European-American settlers. This was called the "Clinton Purchase", after Governor George Clinton. The land comprised the southern portion of the Oneida reservation. It has also been called the Twenty Townships, as these were the number organized after New York controlled the land.

As this sale was never ratified by the United States Senate, it was declared unconstitutional in a ruling by the United States Supreme Court in the late twentieth century. New York State had no legal authority after the Revolution and the formation of the United States to negotiate separately with American Indian tribes.

In 1789, Montgomery County was reduced in size by the splitting off of Ontario County. This was later divided to form the present Allegany, Cattaraugus, Chautauqua, Erie, Genesee, Livingston, Monroe, Niagara, Orleans, Steuben, Wyoming, Yates, and part of Schuyler and Wayne counties.

In 1791, Herkimer and Tioga counties were two of three counties split off from Montgomery County (the other being Otsego County).

Chenango County was formed in 1798 from parts of Tioga and Herkimer counties. Finally, Madison County was created from Chenango County in 1806.

About 1802, the Oneida agreed to allocate about 22,000 acres of their land to the Stockbridge and Munsee (Lenape), who were seeking refuge from anti-Native American conflicts by American settlers after the Revolution. Both were Christianized: the Stockbridge had migrated from western Massachusetts and the Lenape from New York and New Jersey. The two peoples were pressured to leave New York for Wisconsin in the 1820s, to make more land available for European-American settlement.

In the late twentieth century, the three recognized Oneida tribes: of Wisconsin, New York, and the Thames reserve in Canada, filed suit in a land claim against New York for its treaty and forced purchase of their ancestral lands after the American Revolutionary War, seeking the return of thousands of acres. The Supreme Court of the United States has ruled the purchase was unconstitutional, as New York did not have the treaty ratified by the United States Senate, and had no authority under the U.S. Constitution to deal directly with the Oneida, a right reserved to the federal government. In 2010 the state offered the Oneida Tribe of Wisconsin more than 300 acres in Sullivan County in the Catskill Mountains, with permission to construct a gambling casino, and two acres in Madison County, to settle their part of the suit. Several private and public interests oppose the deal, including other federally recognized tribes in New York.

== Geography ==
According to the United States Census Bureau, the county has a total area of 661 square miles (1,710 km^{2}), of which 655 square miles (1,700 km^{2}) is land and 6.4 square miles (17 km^{2}) (1.0%) is water.

Madison County is located in central New York State, just east of Syracuse, north of Binghamton, and slightly north of due west from Albany. Madison County contains the geographic center of the state at Pratts Hollow in the Town of Eaton.

Oneida Lake and Oneida Creek define part of the northern boundary. The Great Swamp, formerly located south of the lake, was a rich wetlands habitat important to many species of birds and wildlife. This was drained by local and state construction projects in the early decades of the twentieth century, chiefly by Italian immigrants. The fertile soil supported high production of onions and other commodity crops, and the Italian families grew wealthy from their work. The area was known as "Black Beach" for its mucklands. Chittenango Creek defines much of the western boundary.

=== Adjacent counties and areas ===
Chenango County is across the southern border. Onondaga and Cortland counties form the western border, with Onondaga serving as Madison County's longest and most prominent border. Otsego County forms a short boundary in the southeastern corner of Madison County. Oneida County shares a northeastern border with Madison County. Oneida Lake is the northern border with part of Oswego County on the opposite shore.

== Demographics ==
Historical population
Census	Pop.	Note	%±
1810	25,144		—
1820	32,208		28.1%
1830	39,038		21.2%
1840	40,008		2.5%
1850	43,072		7.7%
1860	43,545		1.1%
1870	43,522		−0.1%
1880	44,112		1.4%
1890	42,892		−2.8%
1900	40,545		−5.5%
1910	39,289		−3.1%
1920	39,535		0.6%
1930	39,790		0.6%
1940	39,598		−0.5%
1950	46,214		16.7%
1960	54,635		18.2%
1970	62,864		15.1%
1980	65,150		3.6%
1990	69,120		6.1%
2000	69,441		0.5%
2010	73,442		5.8%
2020	68,016		−7.4%
2025 (est.)	67,120	▼	−1.3%
U.S. Decennial Census; 1790–1960 1900–1990; 1990–2000 2010–2013

Much of Madison County is rural. However, the communities along NY Route 5 are suburbs of Syracuse, as is Cazenovia.

=== 2020 census ===
Madison County, New York – Racial and ethnic composition Note: the US Census treats Hispanic/Latino as an ethnic category. This table excludes Latinos from the racial categories and assigns them to a separate category. Hispanics/Latinos may be of any race.
Race / Ethnicity (NH = Non-Hispanic)	Pop 1980	Pop 1990	Pop 2000	Pop 2010	Pop 2020	% 1980	% 1990	% 2000	% 2010	% 2020
White alone (NH)	63,997	67,139	66,564	68,916	60,965	98.23%	97.13%	95.86%	93.84%	89.63%
Black or African American alone (NH)	459	716	870	1,260	1,071	0.70%	1.04%	1.25%	1.72%	1.57%
Native American or Alaska Native alone (NH)	161	253	331	473	435	0.25%	0.37%	0.48%	0.64%	0.64%
Asian alone (NH)	155	409	385	576	664	0.24%	0.59%	0.55%	0.78%	0.98%
Native Hawaiian or Pacific Islander alone (NH)	x	x	10	11	11	x	x	0.01%	0.01%	0.02%
Other race alone (NH)	42	31	36	46	187	0.06%	0.04%	0.05%	0.06%	0.27%
Mixed race or Multiracial (NH)	x	x	511	844	3,010	x	x	0.74%	1.15%	4.43%
Hispanic or Latino (any race)	336	572	734	1,316	1,673	0.52%	0.83%	1.06%	1.79%	2.46%
Total	65,150	69,120	69,441	73,442	68,016	100.00%	100.00%	100.00%	100.00%	100.00%

=== 2000 census ===
As of the census of 2000, there were 69,441 people, 25,368 households, and 17,580 families residing in the county. The population density was 106 inhabitants per square mile (41/km^{2}). There were 28,646 housing units at an average density of 44 units per square mile (17/km^{2}). The racial makeup of the county was 96.49% White, 1.32% African American, 0.52% Native American, 0.56% Asian, 0.01% Pacific Islander, 0.26% from other races, and 0.84% from two or more races. Hispanic or Latino people of any race were 1.06% of the population; 16.1% were of German, 15.6% English, 15.5% Irish, 12.1% Italian, and 8.0% American ancestry according to Census 2000. Of these 95.6% spoke English and 1.9% Spanish as their first language.

There were 25,368 households, out of which 33.60% had children under the age of 18 living with them, 55.10% were married couples living together, 9.70% had a female householder with no husband present, and 30.70% were non-families. Of all households 24.50% were made up of individuals, and 10.30% had someone living alone who was 65 years of age or older. The average household size was 2.55 and the average family size was 3.04.

In the county, the population was spread out, with 24.90% under the age of 18, 12.00% from 18 to 24, 27.60% from 25 to 44, 23.00% from 45 to 64, and 12.50% who were 65 years of age or older. The median age was 36 years. For every 100 females there were 96.30 males. For every 100 females age 18 and over, there were 93.80 males.

The median income for a household in the county was $40,184, and the median income for a family was $47,889. Males had a median income of $33,069 versus $25,026 for females. The per capita income for the county was $19,105. About 6.30% of families and 9.80% of the population were below the poverty line, including 10.50% of those under age 18 and 8.80% of those age 65 or over.

== Communities ==
=== Larger settlements ===
#	Location	Population	Type	Sector
1	Oneida	11,390	City	Northeast
2	Chittenango	5,081	Village	Northwest
3	Canastota	4,804	Village	Northwest
4	Hamilton	4,239	Village	Southeast
5	Cazenovia	2,835	Village	Southwest
6	Morrisville	2,199	Village	Southeast
7	‡Bridgeport	1,490	CDP	Northwest
8	‡Earlville	872	Village	Southeast
9	DeRuyter	558	Village	Southwest
10	†Wampsville	543	Village	Northeast
11	Munnsville	474	Village	Northeast
12	Madison	305	Village	Southeast

† - County seat

‡ - Not wholly in this county

=== Towns ===
The towns in southern Madison County originated from the Twenty Townships ceded by the Oneida tribe to the State of New York.

- Brookfield
- Cazenovia
- DeRuyter
- Eaton
- Fenner
- Georgetown
- Hamilton
- Lebanon
- Lenox
- Lincoln
- Madison
- Nelson
- Smithfield
- Stockbridge
- Sullivan

=== Hamlets ===
- Hubbardsville
- Leonardsville
- New Woodstock
- Peterboro
- West Edmeston

== Politics ==
For the majority of its history, Madison County has been a mostly Republican county, with the party's presidential candidates winning the county in every election but one from 1884 to 1992. The one exception to this was in 1964, as the county swung strongly to the Democratic column for the first time thanks to Barry Goldwater's conservatism alienating the Northeast, giving Lyndon B. Johnson a wide margin of victory as he won every county in the state and won by a landslide nationally. As New York has turned into a solid blue state, the county has become a swing county and national bellwether from 1996 onward. However, the margins of victory for the two parties in recent elections have been quite different. The three most recent Republican victories in the county have all been by over 10 percentage points, while the three most recent Democratic wins have all been by margins of under 600 votes.

United States presidential election results for Madison County, New York
Year	Republican		Democratic		Third party(ies)	
Year	No.	%	No.	%	No.	%
1884	6,608	54.64%	4,870	40.27%	615	5.09%
1888	7,199	58.25%	4,641	37.55%	519	4.20%
1892	6,533	57.20%	4,054	35.50%	834	7.30%
1896	7,588	65.56%	3,580	30.93%	406	3.51%
1900	7,174	63.37%	3,673	32.44%	474	4.19%
1904	6,947	63.48%	3,410	31.16%	586	5.36%
1908	6,727	61.28%	3,637	33.13%	614	5.59%
1912	3,490	35.15%	3,164	31.86%	3,276	32.99%
1916	5,881	57.56%	3,937	38.53%	399	3.91%
1920	11,094	72.28%	3,797	24.74%	457	2.98%
1924	11,589	71.01%	3,430	21.02%	1,302	7.98%
1928	14,333	72.20%	5,217	26.28%	301	1.52%
1932	11,931	61.91%	6,896	35.78%	445	2.31%
1936	14,353	69.71%	5,867	28.49%	370	1.80%
1940	15,262	70.46%	6,301	29.09%	99	0.46%
1944	13,369	68.51%	6,109	31.31%	36	0.18%
1948	13,413	68.23%	5,937	30.20%	308	1.57%
1952	17,715	76.73%	5,353	23.19%	19	0.08%
1956	18,555	79.10%	4,903	20.90%	0	0.00%
1960	16,245	65.78%	8,433	34.15%	19	0.08%
1964	8,858	38.21%	14,313	61.75%	9	0.04%
1968	13,819	62.79%	7,056	32.06%	1,135	5.16%
1972	18,392	74.47%	6,241	25.27%	64	0.26%
1976	15,674	63.74%	8,822	35.87%	95	0.39%
1980	13,369	55.85%	7,843	32.77%	2,725	11.38%
1984	17,568	67.67%	8,291	31.93%	104	0.40%
1988	14,902	57.86%	10,665	41.41%	187	0.73%
1992	11,293	38.90%	10,099	34.78%	7,642	26.32%
1996	11,324	41.96%	11,832	43.84%	3,832	14.20%
2000	14,879	52.45%	12,017	42.36%	1,470	5.18%
2004	16,537	54.60%	13,121	43.32%	629	2.08%
2008	14,434	48.43%	14,692	49.30%	676	2.27%
2012	13,622	48.49%	13,871	49.37%	601	2.14%
2016	15,936	53.01%	11,667	38.81%	2,461	8.19%
2020	18,409	54.09%	14,805	43.50%	821	2.41%
2024	19,025	55.92%	14,629	43.00%	365	1.07%

== Education ==
=== School districts ===
School districts include:

- Brookfield Central School District
- Canastota Central School District
- Cazenovia Central School District
- Chittenango Central School District
- DeRuyter Central School District
- East Syracuse-Minoa Central School District
- Edmeston Central School District
- Fabius-Pompey Central School District
- Fayetteville-Manlius Central School District
- Georgetown-South Otselic Central School District
- Hamilton Central School District
- Madison Central School District
- Morrisville-Eaton Central School District
- Mount Markham Central School District
- Oneida City School District
- Sherburne-Earlville Central School District
- Sherrill City School District
- Stockbridge Valley Central School District
- Unadilla Valley Central School District
- Waterville Central School District

=== Colleges and universities ===
- Colgate University
- State University of New York at Morrisville
- Cazenovia College (closed)

== See also ==
- Fugitive Slave Convention
- Gerrit Smith
- List of counties in New York
- List of New York State Historic Markers in Madison County, New York
- National Register of Historic Places listings in Madison County, New York
