= Perryville Falls =

Waterfall in Central New York

Coordinates: 43°0′35.2″N 75°48′21.6″W

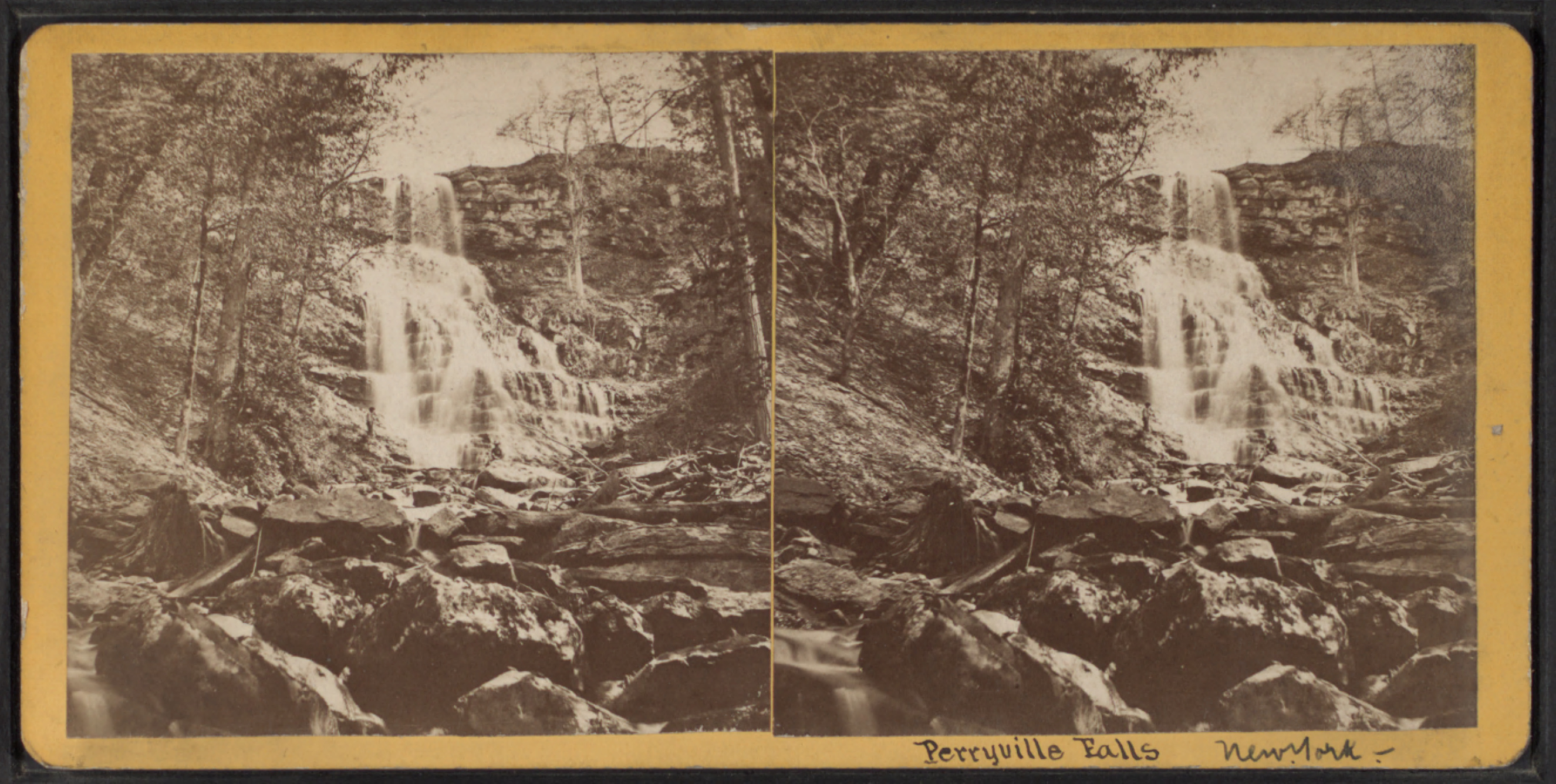
Perryville Falls in the second half of the 19th-century

Perryville Falls is a privately owned 120–150 feet (37–46 m) tall waterfall near Perryville, New York, on the Canaseraga Creek.

== Description ==
The falls are approximately 120–150 feet (37–46 m) tall and are located on the Canaseraga Creek 4.0 miles (6.4 km) southeast of Chittenango, New York, near the towns of Sullivan, Lincoln, and Fenner, as well as Perryville. They are about 3 miles (4.8 km) northeast of Chittenango Falls.

== History ==
A visitor wrote in an 1871 sketch that "No one with any love of nature can afford to stop here without visiting Perryville Falls, for nature is generous in her wild and grand gifts." In 1890 a Justin explosive cartridge was tested at the falls in a 9 inches (230 mm) rifle. In 1922 the American Journal of Botany reported that the area around the falls held populations of Asplenium scolopendrium.

By 1966 they were described in The Post-Standard as "one of the few high falls not taken over by the state." In 1970 an eighteen year old man was seriously injured when he fell 50 feet (15 m) off a ledge on the falls. Such injuries became increasingly common throughout the 1970s; by 1977 nine people had been injured by falling in the past decade and the falls were a common site of teen partying, underage drinking and cannabis smoking. On May 4, 1977, the Sullivan town board voted to mark the area off with 'no parking' and 'no trespassing' signs and close an access road after multiple requests to do so by town residents.

== See also ==
- List of waterfalls
