= Cedar Cove (Cazenovia, New York) =

Historic house in New York, United States

- U.S. National Register of Historic Places
- U.S. Historic district
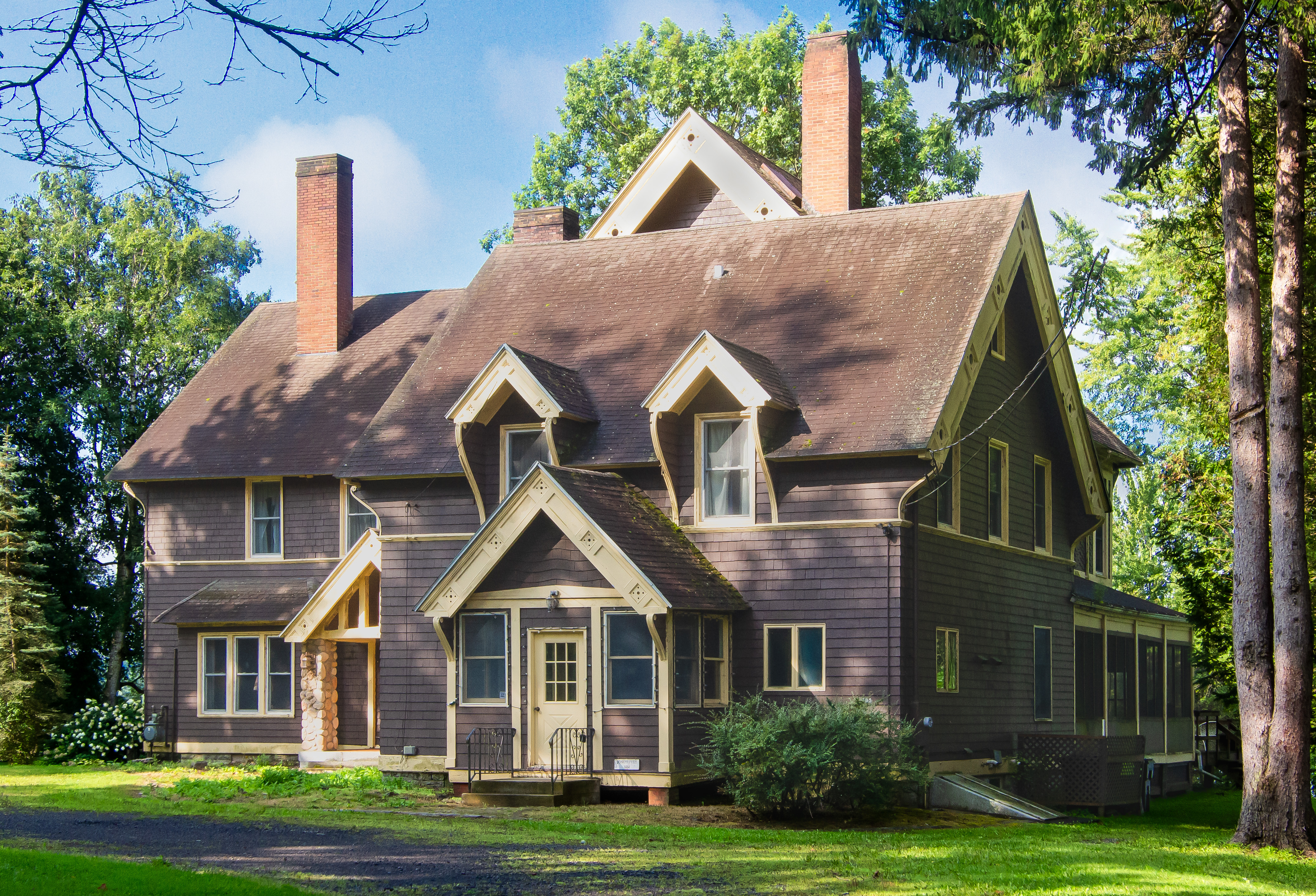

- Location within New York Location within the United States
- Nearest city: Cazenovia, New York
- Coordinates: 42°57′0″N 75°51′49″W
- Area: 5.5 acres (2.2 ha)
- Built: 1884
- Architect: Post, George Browne; Potter, Henry H.
- Architectural style: Stick/Eastlake, Shingle Style, Romanesque
- MPS: Cazenovia Town MRA
- NRHP reference No.: 91000867
- Added to NRHP: July 15, 1991

Cedar Cove (1884), also known as Villa LeMoyne or the Joseph D. Peet Estate, is a "summer cottage" on the eastern shore of Cazenovia Lake in Cazenovia, Madison County, New York. It was listed on the National Register of Historic Places in 1991.

The listing includes 4 contributing buildings, 2 non-contributing buildings over a 5.5-acre (2.2 ha) area. Also on the property is a Tudor-style boathouse.

Cedar Cove is "architecturally and historically important as an outstanding early example of the type of large mansions constructed chiefly as summer residences by wealthy clients in the late nineteenth and early twentieth centuries near the shores of Cazenovia Lake in central New York."

Designed by architect George Browne Post, it set a high standard. Other "summer cottages" following included Ormonde, designed by architect Frank Furness; Notleymere, designed by architect Robert W. Gibson; Scrooby, designed by architect Robert S. Stephenson; and Shore Acres, designed by architect Stanford White.

It is part of the Cazenovia Town Multiple Resource area.
