= Helen L. McNitt State Park =

State park in Madison County, New York

- Location within New York Location within the United States
- Type: State park
- Location: Madison County, New York
- Nearest city: Cazenovia
- Coordinates: 42°58′15″N 75°52′36″W
- Area: 134 acres (0.54 km^{2})
- Created: 1999
- Operator: New York State Office of Parks, Recreation and Historic Preservation
- Open: All year

Helen L. McNitt State Park is a 134-acre (0.54 km^{2}) state park located in the town of Cazenovia in Madison County, New York. The park is adjacent to Cazenovia Lake. Although it remained largely undeveloped since its donation to the state by the McNitt family in 1999, plans to improve lake access and facilities were approved in 2015.

== History ==
The land comprising Helen L. McNitt State Park was donated by its former owners, the McNitt family, to the State of New York in 1999 with the intention that it be used as a public park. After the state assumed ownership, it remained largely undeveloped, with the exception of a small parking lot built in 2008. Plans to improve access to the lake, including the installation of a dock, building a canoe/kayak launch, and installing boardwalks and pathways, were approved by the Cazenovia Town Board in early 2015. By the end of that year, the New York State Office of Parks, Recreation and Historic Preservation announced that $90,000 in improvements would be made at the park based on the town-approved plan, with construction planned to begin in spring 2016.

== Description ==
The 134-acre (54 ha) park is recognized as the largest parcel of undeveloped property on Cazenovia Lake. It includes 1,300 feet (400 m) of shoreline along the lake, and is a popular spot for ice fishing access during the winter.

== See also ==
- List of New York state parks
