= Ormonde (Cazenovia, New York) =

Historic house in New York, United States

- U.S. National Register of Historic Places
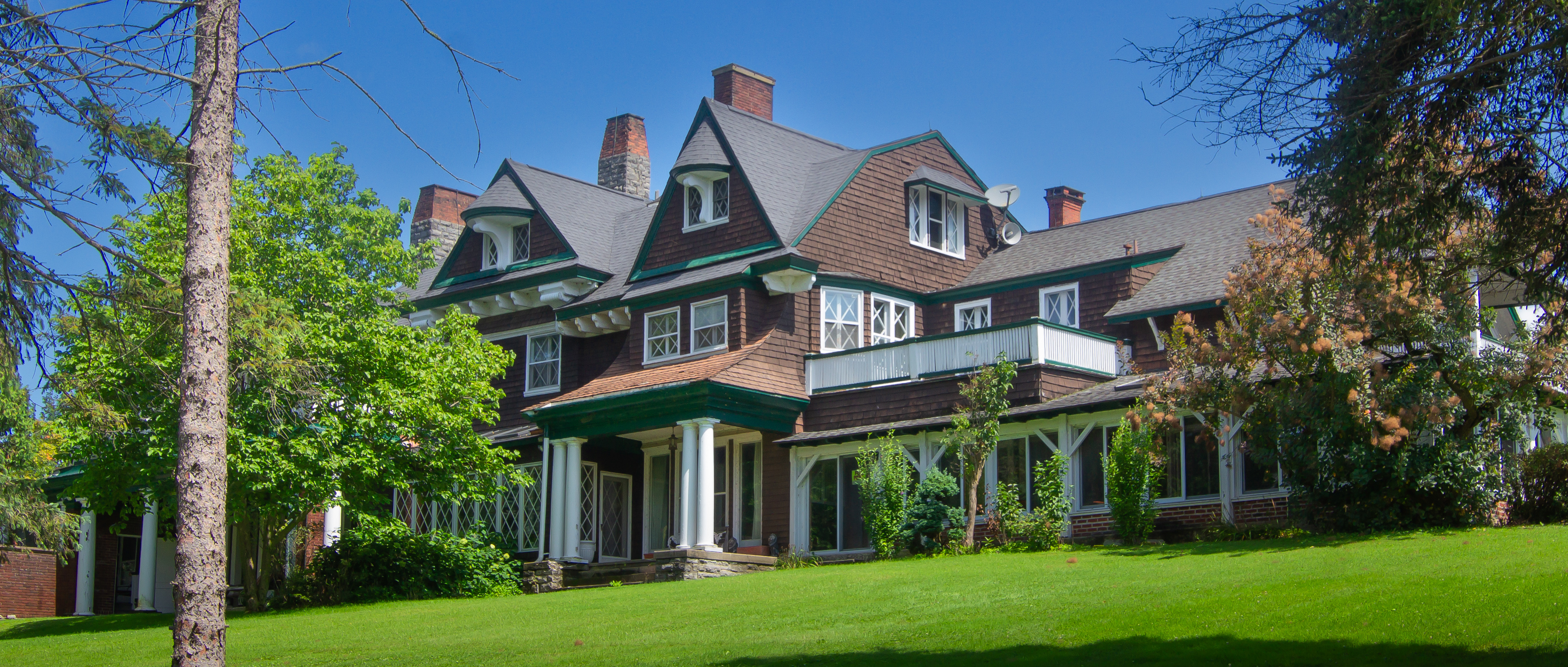

- Location within New York Location within the United States
- Nearest city: Cazenovia, New York
- Coordinates: 42°57′20″N 75°51′41″W
- Area: 2.4 acres (0.97 ha)
- Built: 1885-88
- Architect: Furness & Evans; Furness, Frank
- Architectural style: Colonial Revival, Queen Anne, Shingle Style
- MPS: Cazenovia Town MRA
- NRHP reference No.: 91000866
- Added to NRHP: July 15, 1991

Ormonde (1885–88) is a Shingle Style country house built on the eastern shore of Cazenovia Lake in Cazenovia, New York. It was designed by architect Frank Furness for George R. Preston, a New Orleans banker who settled in Philadelphia, Pennsylvania.

The 9-bedroom "summer cottage" was originally the centerpiece of a 300-acre (121.4 ha) estate, that was expanded to 400 acres (161.8 ha) early in the 20th century. The carriagehouse and other buildings have since been demolished, and the land subdivided, leaving the main house and boathouse on 2.4 acres (1 ha).

The boathouse's design is unusual: a square stone ground floor at lake's edge supporting a circular shingled second floor, ringed by a 360-degree deck. It relates to Furness's Undine Barge Club (1882–83) on Philadelphia's Boathouse Row, and the architect's own summer cottage, Idlewild (c. 1890), in Media, Pennsylvania.

The property was listed on the National Register of Historic Places in 1991. In addition to the main house and boathouse, it includes one non-contributing building.

Ormonde is "architecturally and historically important as an outstanding early example of the type of large mansions constructed chiefly as summer residences by wealthy clients in the late nineteenth and early twentieth centuries near the shores of Cazenovia Lake in central New York."

It followed Cedar Cove (1884), designed by architect George Browne Post, the first "summer cottage" built on the lake. Others included Notleymere, designed by architect Robert W. Gibson; Scrooby (The Brewster Inn), designed by architect Robert S. Stephenson; and Shore Acres, designed by architect Stanford White.

Ormonde is part of the Cazenovia Town Multiple Resource area.
