= Lehigh Valley Railroad Station =

Lehigh Valley Railroad Station or Lehigh Valley Railroad Depot may refer to:

- Lehigh Valley Railroad Station (Ithaca, New York), listed on the NRHP in New York
- Lehigh Valley Railroad Station (Rochester, New York), listed on the NRHP in New York
- Lehigh Valley Railroad Depot (Cazenovia, New York), listed on the NRHP in New York

== See also ==
- Lehigh Valley Railroad Headquarters Building, Bethlehem, Pennsylvania, listed on the NRHP in Northampton County, Pennsylvania
