= Shore Acres, New York =

Shore Acres, New York may refer to:

- Shore Acres, Monroe County, New York, a hamlet in the town of Hamlin, New York
- Shore Acres, Staten Island, a neighborhood located in Staten Island, New York
- Shore Acres (Madison County, New York) , a mansion near Cazenovia Lake, New York
