= Lorenzo State Historic Site =

State historic site of New York, US

- Lorenzo
- U.S. National Register of Historic Places
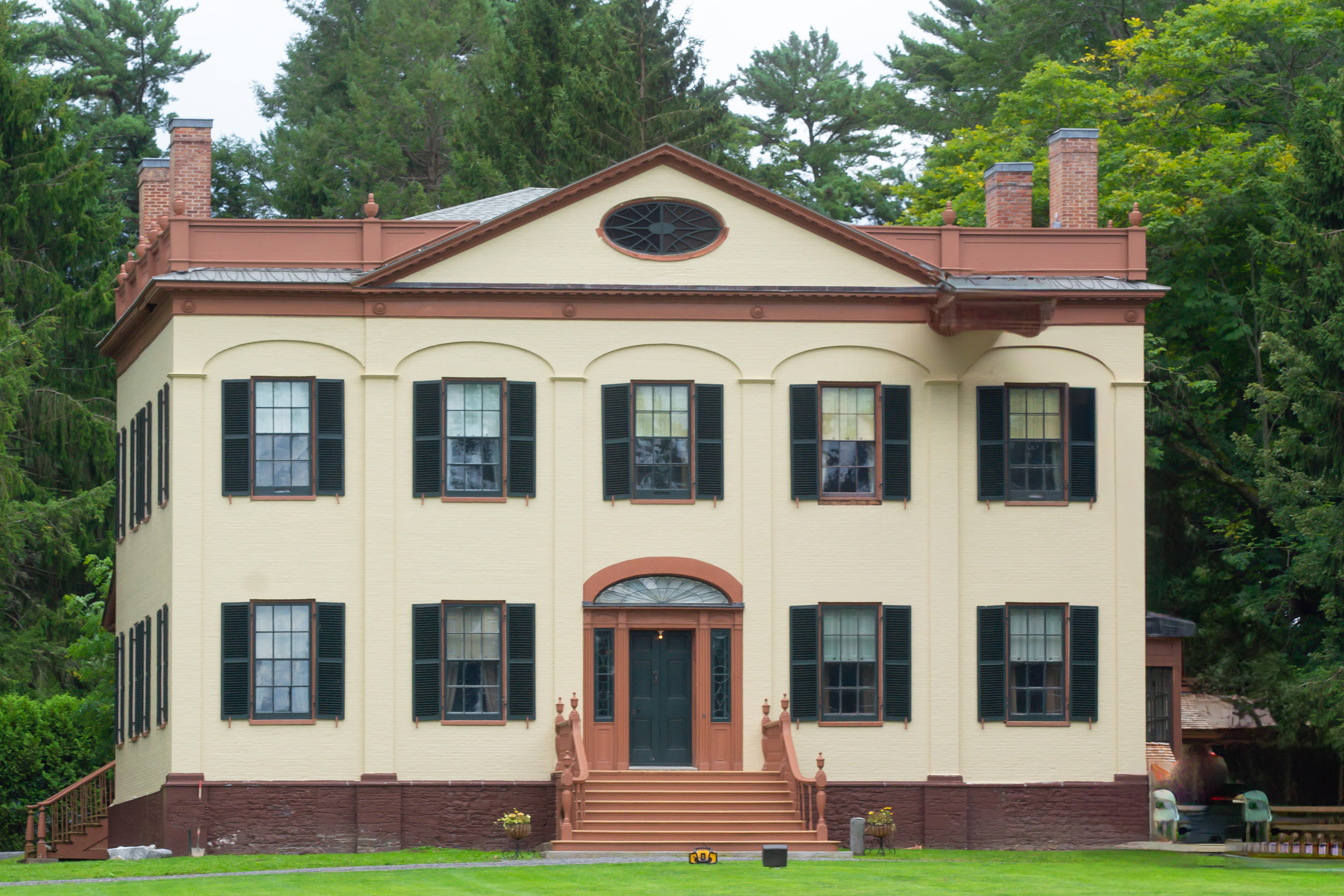

- Location within New York Location within the United States
- Location: Ledyard St. (U.S. 20), Cazenovia, New York
- Coordinates: 42°55′23″N 75°51′56″W
- Built: 1807-1809
- NRHP reference No.: 71000541
- Added to NRHP: February 18, 1971

Lorenzo State Historic Site is a mansion built by Colonel John Lincklaen, founder of the village of Cazenovia, New York. Colonel Linklaen was the agent of the Holland Land Company upon whose recommendation the Company purchased the 135,000-acre (55,000 ha) tract of land where the village grew. The painted brick mansion, begun in 1807 and completed in 1809, overlooks Cazenovia Lake. It was listed in the National Register of Historic Places in July 1970. Located on the grounds is the separately listed Rippleton Schoolhouse.

== See also ==
- List of New York State Historic Sites
