= Rippleton Schoolhouse =

- U.S. National Register of Historic Places
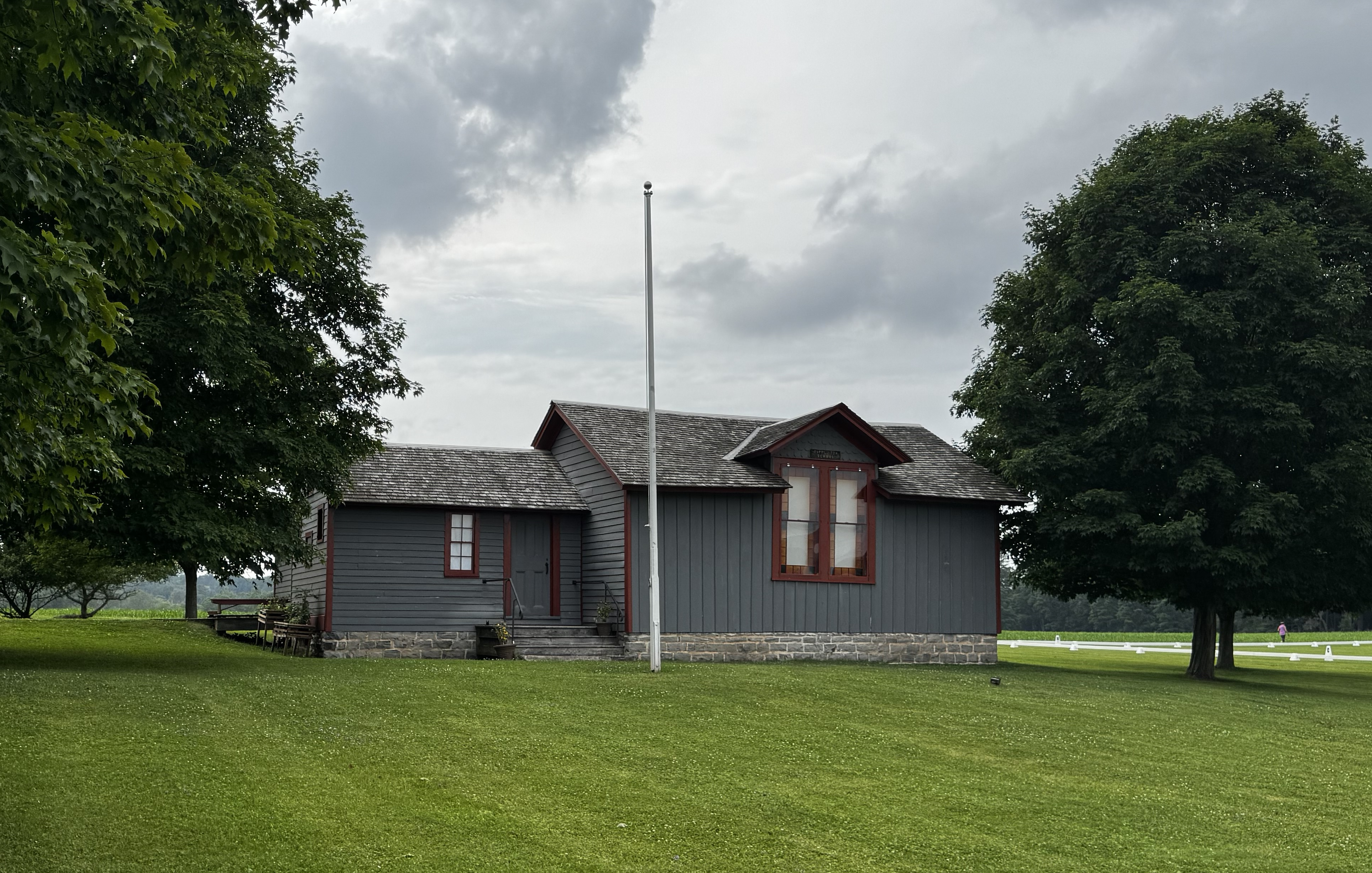

- Location within New York Location within the United States
- Location: Rippleton Rd., 15 mi. SE of Syracuse, Cazenovia, New York
- Coordinates: 42°55′16″N 75°51′46″W
- Area: less than one acre
- Built: 1814
- Architectural style: Federal, Queen Anne
- NRHP reference No.: 98000996
- Added to NRHP: August 6, 1998

Rippleton Schoolhouse is a historic one-room school building located at Cazenovia in Madison County, New York. It was built in 1814 and remodelled in 1884. It consists of two gabled units and is built of a heavy timber mortise and tenon framework. It was moved to its present site on the grounds of the Lorenzo State Historic Site in 1997.

It was added to the National Register of Historic Places in 1998.

The Friends of Lorenzo have restored the schoolhouse to an 1880s appearance. The museum is open for school tours by appointment.
