= Cazenovia station (Lehigh Valley Railroad) =

- Lehigh Valley Railroad Depot
- U.S. National Register of Historic Places
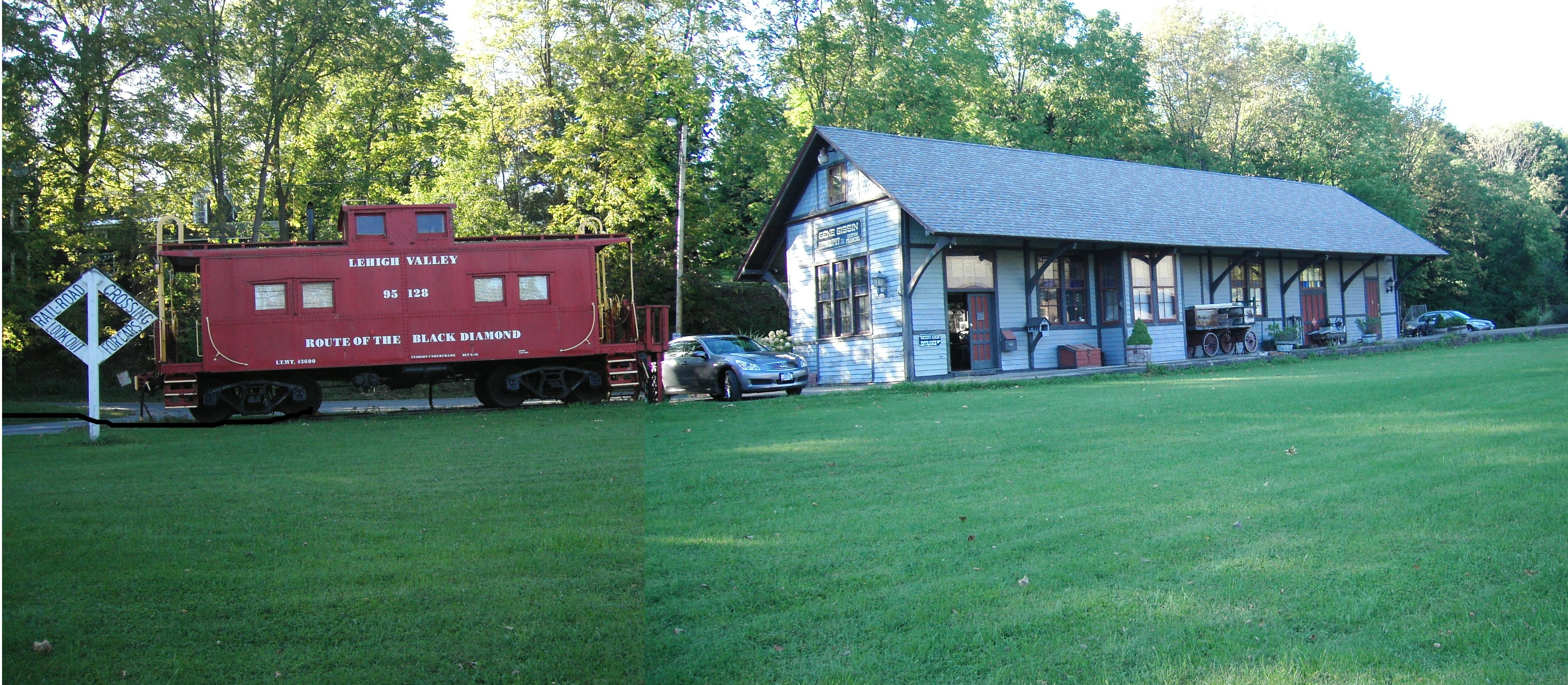

- Location within New York Location within the United States
- Location: William St., Cazenovia, New York
- Coordinates: 42°55′58″N 75°50′56″W
- Area: 1.3 acres (0.53 ha)
- Built: 1894
- Architect: Elmira, Cortland & Northern Railroad
- Architectural style: Stick/Eastlake, Queen Anne, Eastern Stick
- MPS: Cazenovia Town MRA
- NRHP reference No.: 91000874
- Added to NRHP: July 15, 1991

Lehigh Valley Railroad Depot is a historic railroad depot building located at Cazenovia in Madison County, New York. It was built in 1894 as a depot for the Elmira, Cortland and Northern Railroad, later the Lehigh Valley Railroad. It is a 1 1/2-story, rectangular, gable-roofed, largely clapboarded structure. It is a distinctive example of the Stick-Eastlake–style architecture. It was abandoned by the railroad in 1965. This was a stop on the Lehigh Valley's Elmira and Cortland Branch which actually went to Canastota and Camden, on the section between Cortland and Canastota. Service was eliminated by the early 1940s.

It was added to the National Register of Historic Places in 1991.

| Preceding station | Lehigh Valley Railroad | Following station |
Former services
| Rippleton toward Elmira | Elmira and Cortland Branch | Bingley toward Camden |
