= Clockville, New York =

- Hamlet
- Location within New York Location within the United States
- Coordinates: 43°02′30″N 75°44′40″W
- Country: United States
- State: New York
- County: Madison
- Town: Lincoln
- Elevation: 689 ft (210 m)
- Time zone: UTC-5 (Eastern (EST))
  - Summer (DST): UTC-4 (EDT)
- ZIP code: 13043
- Area codes: 315 & 680
- GNIS feature ID: 946909

Clockville is a hamlet in Madison County, New York, United States. The community is 2.6 miles (4.2 km) south of Canastota. Clockville has a post office with ZIP code 13043.
