= Fenner, New York =

- Town
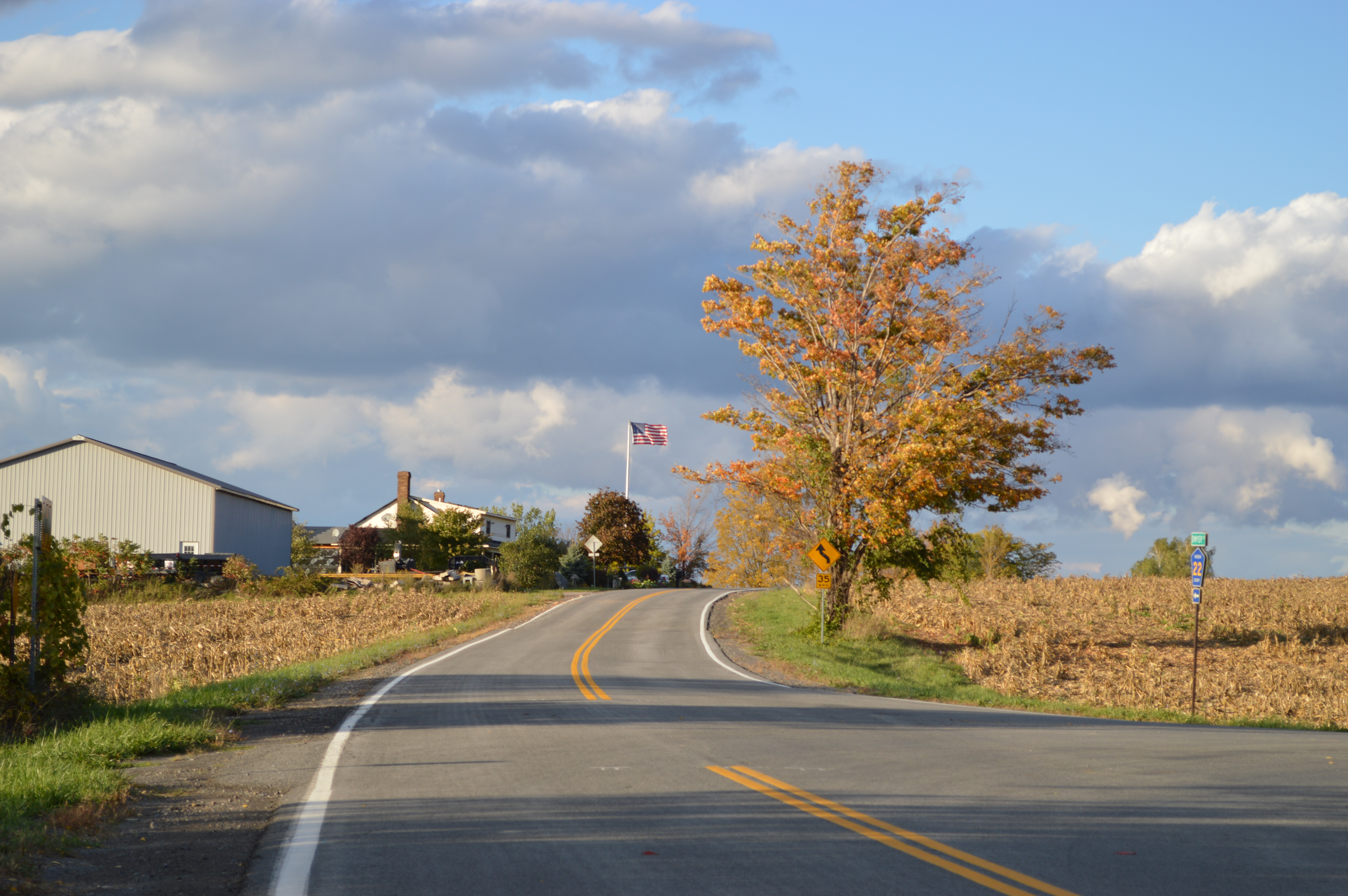
- The town of Fenner

- Location within New York Location within the United States
- Coordinates: 42°58′42″N 75°46′52″W
- Country: United States
- State: New York
- County: Madison

Government
  - Type: Town Council
  - Town Supervisor: David R. Jones (R)
  - Town Council: Members' List: • William Cody (R); • Adam Pushlar (R); • Hannah S. Strack (R); • William W. Wester (R)

Area
  - Total: 31.09 sq mi (80.53 km^{2})
  - Land: 31.05 sq mi (80.41 km^{2})
  - Water: 0.046 sq mi (0.12 km^{2})
- Elevation: 1,480 ft (451 m)

Population (2020)
  - Total: 1,668
  - Density: 53.72/sq mi (20.74/km^{2})
- Time zone: UTC-5 (Eastern (EST))
  - Summer (DST): UTC-4 (EDT)
- ZIP Codes: 13035 (Cazenovia); 13037 (Chittenango); 13032 (Canastota)
- Area code: 315
- FIPS code: 36-053-25593
- GNIS feature ID: 0978955
- Website: www.townoffenner.com

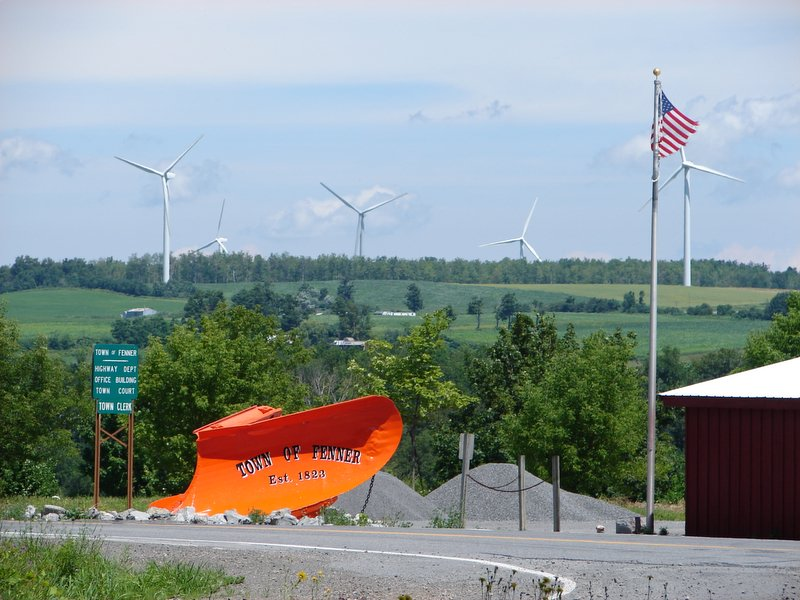
The Fenner wind turbines, erected in 2001, are the first of their kind to be installed in Central New York.

Fenner is a town in Madison County, New York, United States. The population was 1,668 at the 2020 census. The town is in the north-central part of the county, east of Cazenovia Lake.

== History ==
The area was settled around 1795. The town was formed in 1823 from Cazenovia and Smithfield. Fenner was named for a Governor Fenner of Rhode Island.

The Fenner Baptist Church was listed on the National Register of Historic Places in 2002.

== Geography ==
The center of Fenner is 5 miles (8 km) northeast of Cazenovia, 7 miles (11 km) southeast of Chittenango, and 12 miles (19 km) southwest of Oneida.

According to the U.S. Census Bureau, the town has a total area of 31.1 square miles (81 km^{2}), of which 0.05 square miles (0.13 km^{2}), or 0.15%, are water. The western half of the town is drained by Chittenango Creek, while the eastern half is mainly drained by Oneida Creek, both north-flowing stream. The entire town is within the watershed of Oneida Lake.

== Demographics ==
Historical population
Census	Pop.	Note	%±
1830	2,017		—
1840	1,997		−1.0%
1850	1,690		−15.4%
1860	1,649		−2.4%
1870	1,381		−16.3%
1880	1,272		−7.9%
1890	1,040		−18.2%
1900	911		−12.4%
1910	807		−11.4%
1920	780		−3.3%
1930	795		1.9%
1940	794		−0.1%
1950	852		7.3%
1960	900		5.6%
1970	1,321		46.8%
1980	1,580		19.6%
1990	1,694		7.2%
2000	1,680		−0.8%
2010	1,726		2.7%
2020	1,668		−3.4%
U.S. Decennial Census

As of the census of 2000, there were 1,680 people, 607 households, and 455 families residing in the town. The population density was 54.0 inhabitants per square mile (20.8/km^{2}). There were 651 housing units at an average density of 20.9 per square mile (8.1/km^{2}). The racial makeup of the town was 98.87% White, 0.18% African American, 0.24% Native American, 0.18% Asian, 0.06% from other races, and 0.48% from two or more races. Hispanic or Latino of any race were 0.36% of the population.

There were 607 households, out of which 38.7% had children under the age of 18 living with them, 60.0% were married couples living together, 9.9% had a female householder with no husband present, and 25.0% were non-families. 18.0% of all households were made up of individuals, and 4.9% had someone living alone who was 65 years of age or older. The average household size was 2.77 and the average family size was 3.14.

In the town, the population was spread out, with 27.7% under the age of 18, 6.5% from 18 to 24, 32.2% from 25 to 44, 24.9% from 45 to 64, and 8.7% who were 65 years of age or older. The median age was 36 years. For every 100 females, there were 100.7 males. For every 100 females age 18 and over, there were 103.4 males.

The median income for a household in the town was $43,846, and the median income for a family was $46,447. Males had a median income of $31,726 versus $25,573 for females. The per capita income for the town was $19,409. About 4.4% of families and 7.1% of the population were below the poverty line, including 8.0% of those under age 18 and 2.8% of those age 65 or over.

== Communities and locations in Fenner ==
- Bingley – A location on the western town line.
- Blakeslee – A hamlet on the northern town line.
- Chittenango Falls – A hamlet on the western town line.
- Christenson Corners – A location north of Fenner village.
- Cody Corners – A location south of Fenner village.
- Fenner – The hamlet of Fenner was formerly called Fenners Corners.
- Perryville – A hamlet on the northern town line. Partially in the Town of Sullivan and Town of Lincoln
- Roberts Corners – A location by the eastern town line.
- Rowan Corners – A hamlet in the northwestern part of the town.
- Milestrip – A hamlet in the northeastern part of the town.

== Additional facts about Fenner ==
Fenner is the location of a windmill power generating station, home to 20 wind turbines which create enough energy to power more than 10,000 homes annually.

== Gallery ==
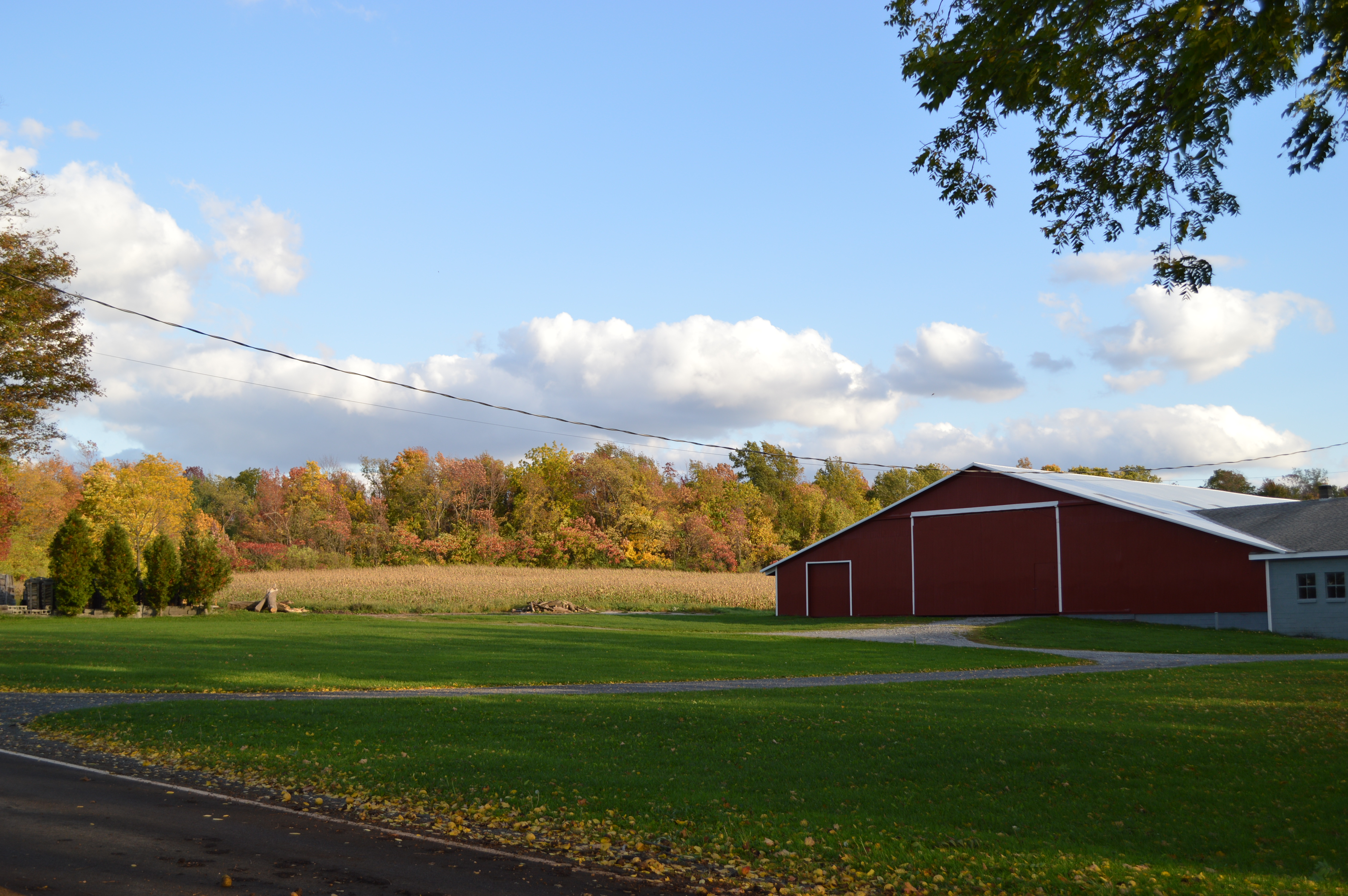

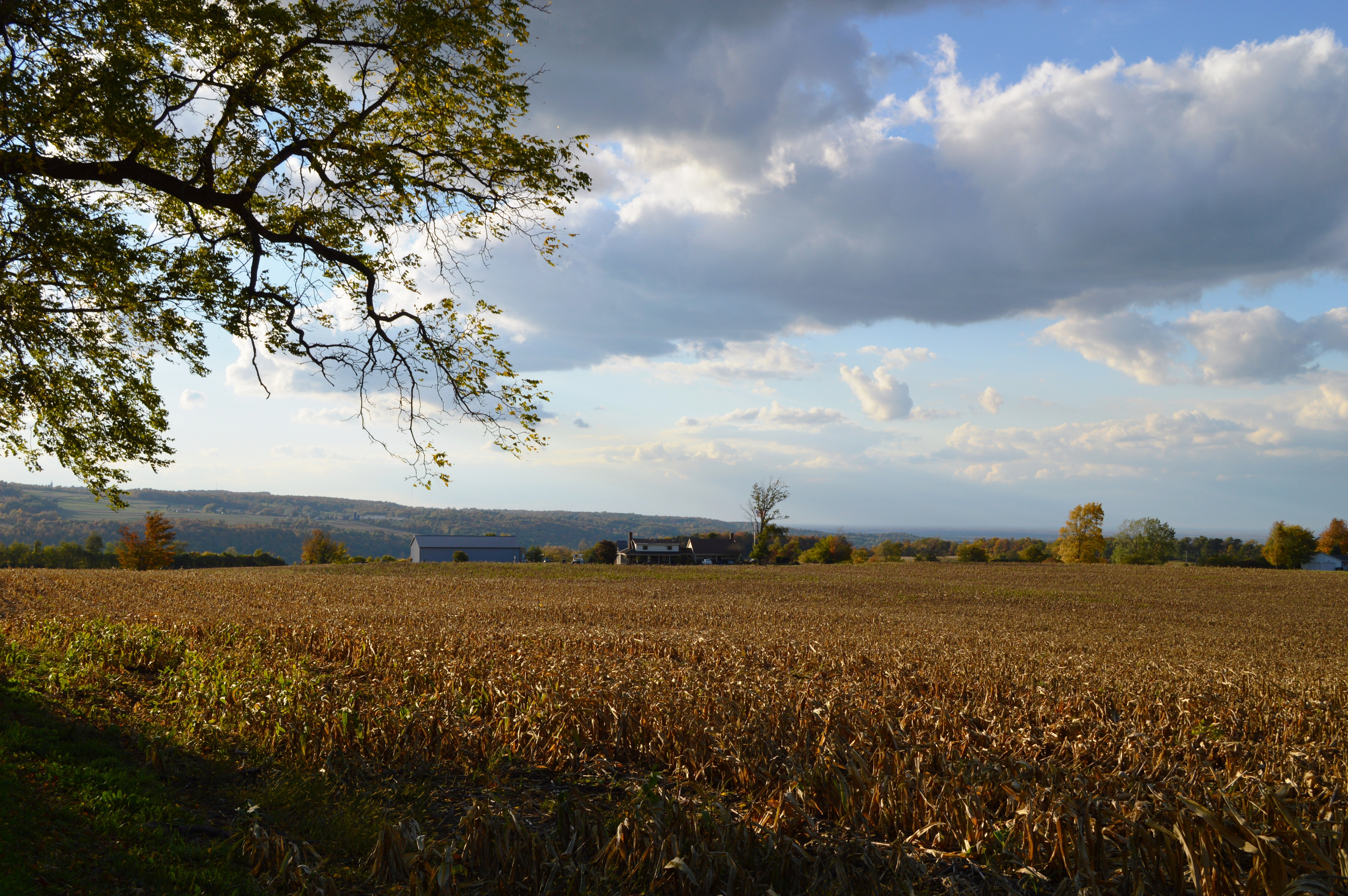

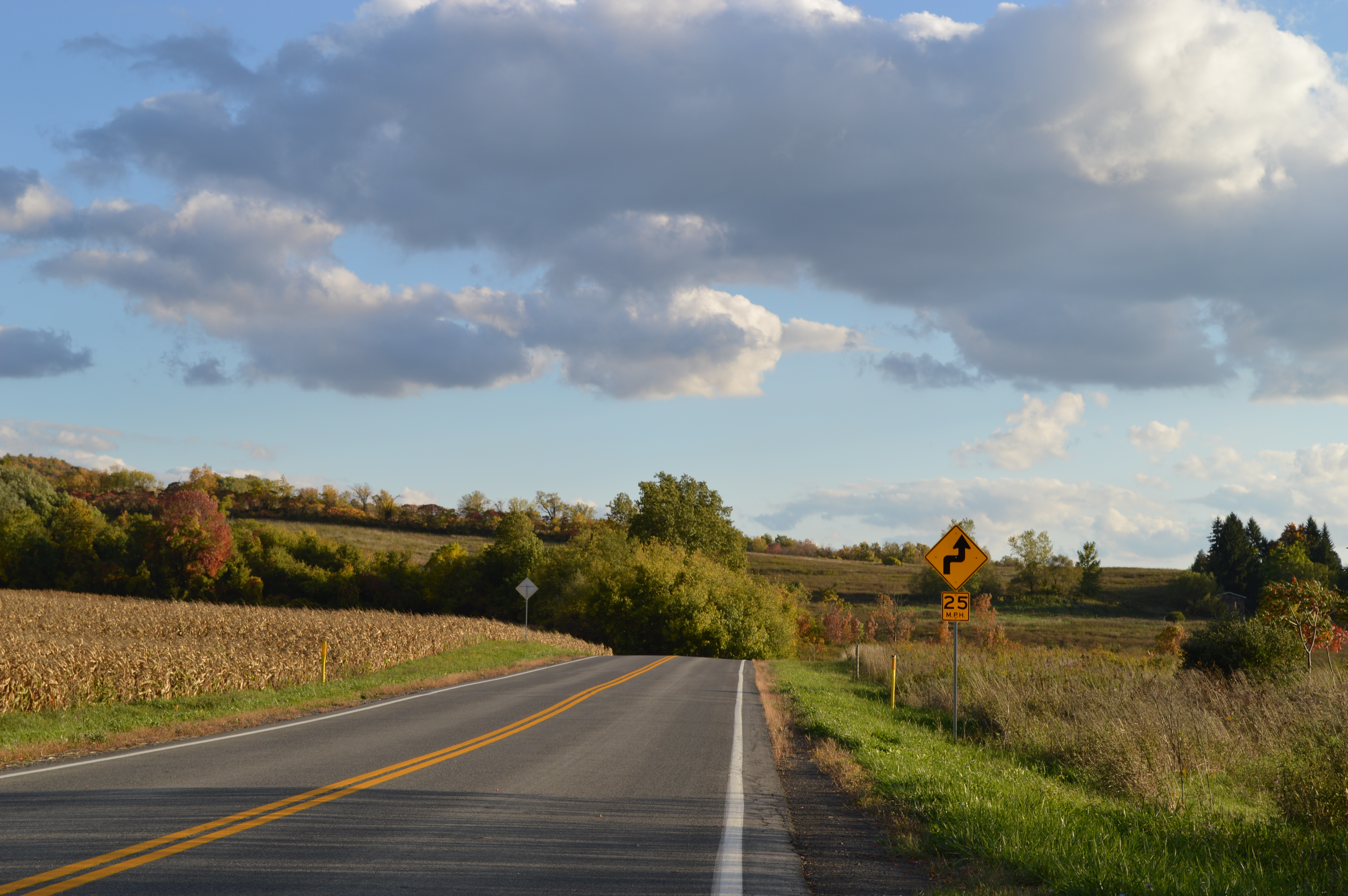
