= Chittenango Falls State Park =

State park in Madison County, New York

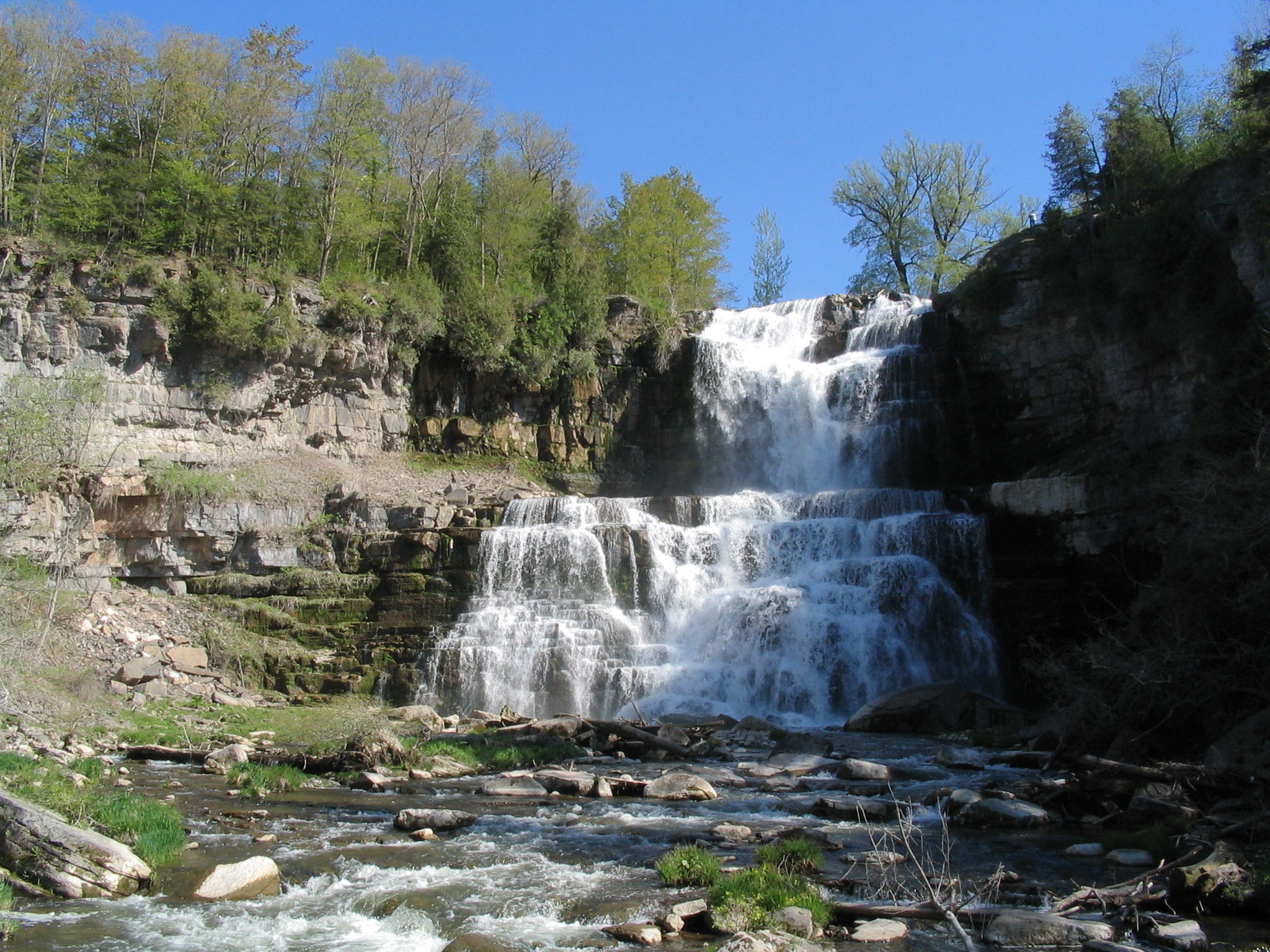
- Chittenango Falls in May 2007

- Location within New York
- Interactive map of Chittenango Falls State Park
- Type: State park
- Location: 2300 Rathbun Road; Cazenovia, New York
- Nearest city: Syracuse, New York
- Coordinates: 42°59′N 75°51′W
- Area: 193 acres (0.78 km^{2})
- Created: 1922
- Operator: New York State Office of Parks, Recreation and Historic Preservation
- Visitors: 46,988 (in 2014)
- Open: All year
- Website: Chittenango Falls State Park

Chittenango Falls State Park is a 193-acre (0.78 km^{2}) state park located in Madison County, New York, east of Cazenovia Lake. The park features a 167-foot (51 m) waterfall that cascades over roughly 400-million-year-old bedrock. At the bottom of the falls Chittenango Creek flows underneath a wooden bridge. The park offers a variety of activities including picnic tables with pavilions, a playground, a nature trail, hiking, and fishing.

Approximately 45,000 visitors come to the park each year to engage in a variety of outdoor recreational activities. Although many camping guides still mistakenly list it as a campground, the park's campground was closed in the mid-2000s.

Chittenango Falls State Park is also home to the endemic and endangered Chittenango ovate amber snail (Novisuccinea chittenangoensis).

Chittenango Falls once marked the boundary between the lands of the Oneida people and the Onondaga people. In 1784 the Oneidas called it “a Place where the Water runs over a Ledge of Rocks” when explaining their homeland’s boundaries to commissioners from New York.

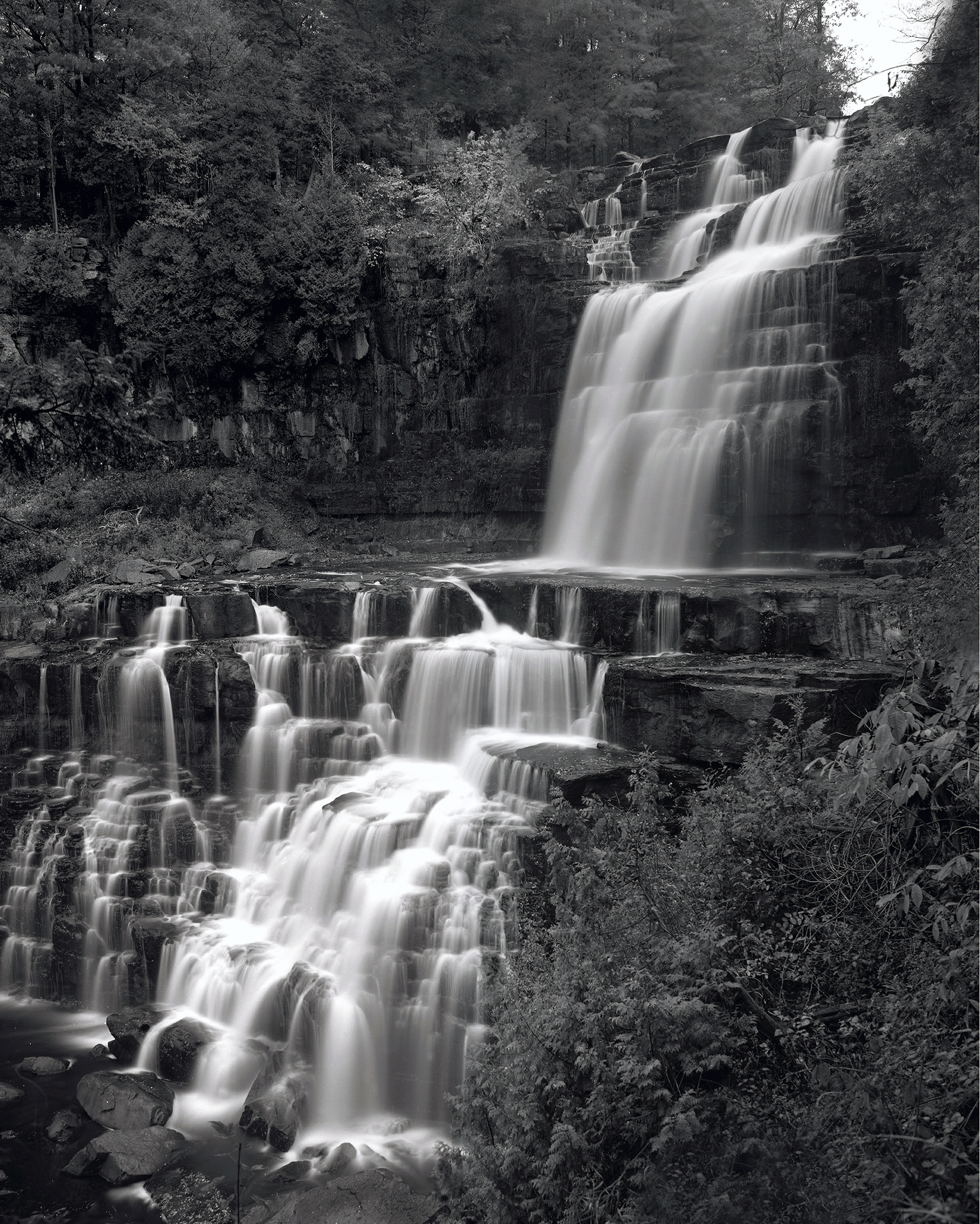
Chittenango Falls, 1993

== Trails and scenic viewing ==
While the park is open year-round, the trail leading to the falls' viewing bridge is closed during winter months due to icy conditions. Views of the falls are still quite picturesque from the top however, with the ability to view the falls from the side of the creek or from a small viewing rail. On the opposite side of the creek, there is a steep uphill trail to the top of the falls opposite the entrance. Along that trail, there are several viewing spots.

== Gallery ==
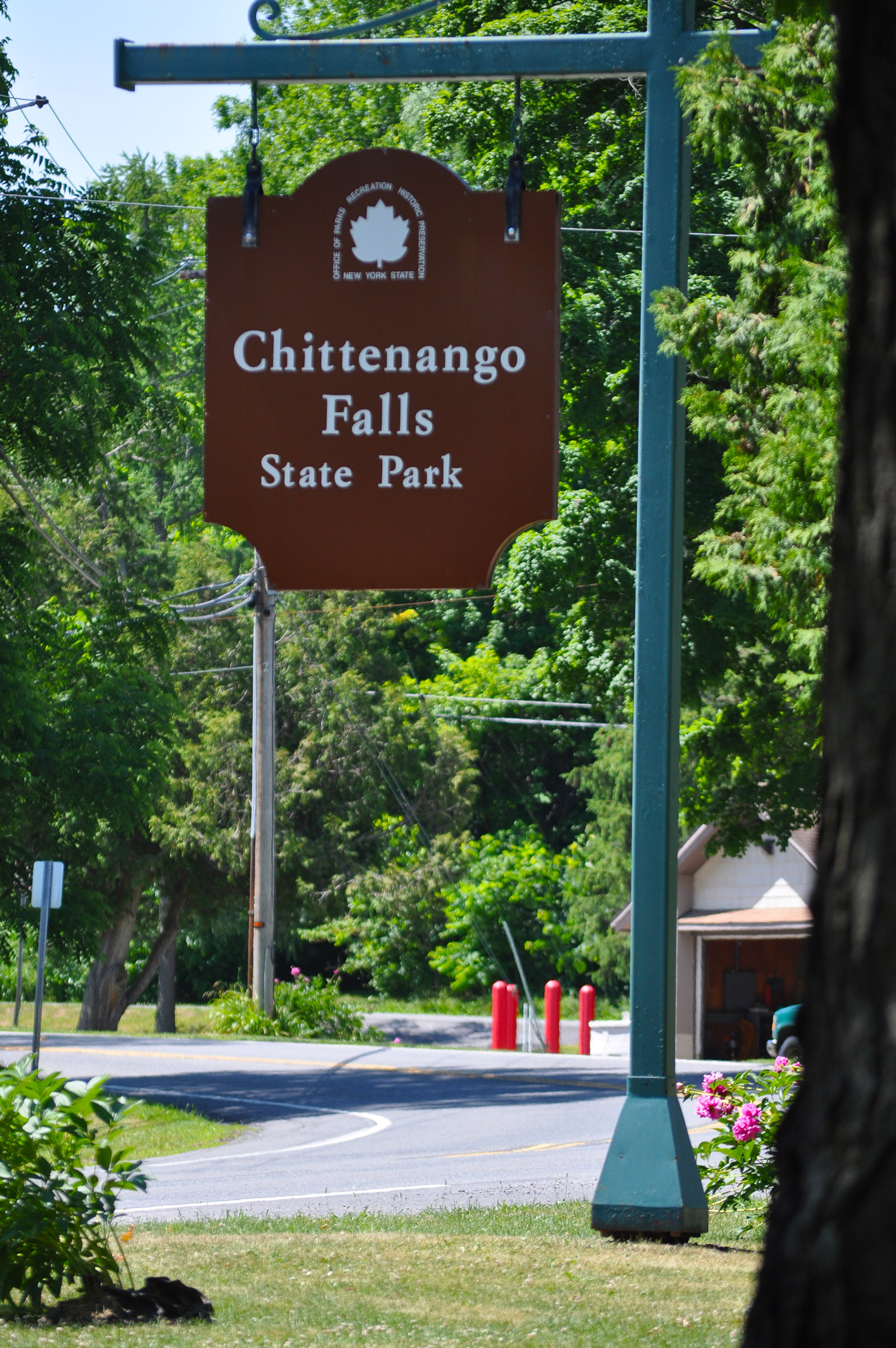
Entrance sign to the park.

View of the falls taken from the bridge.

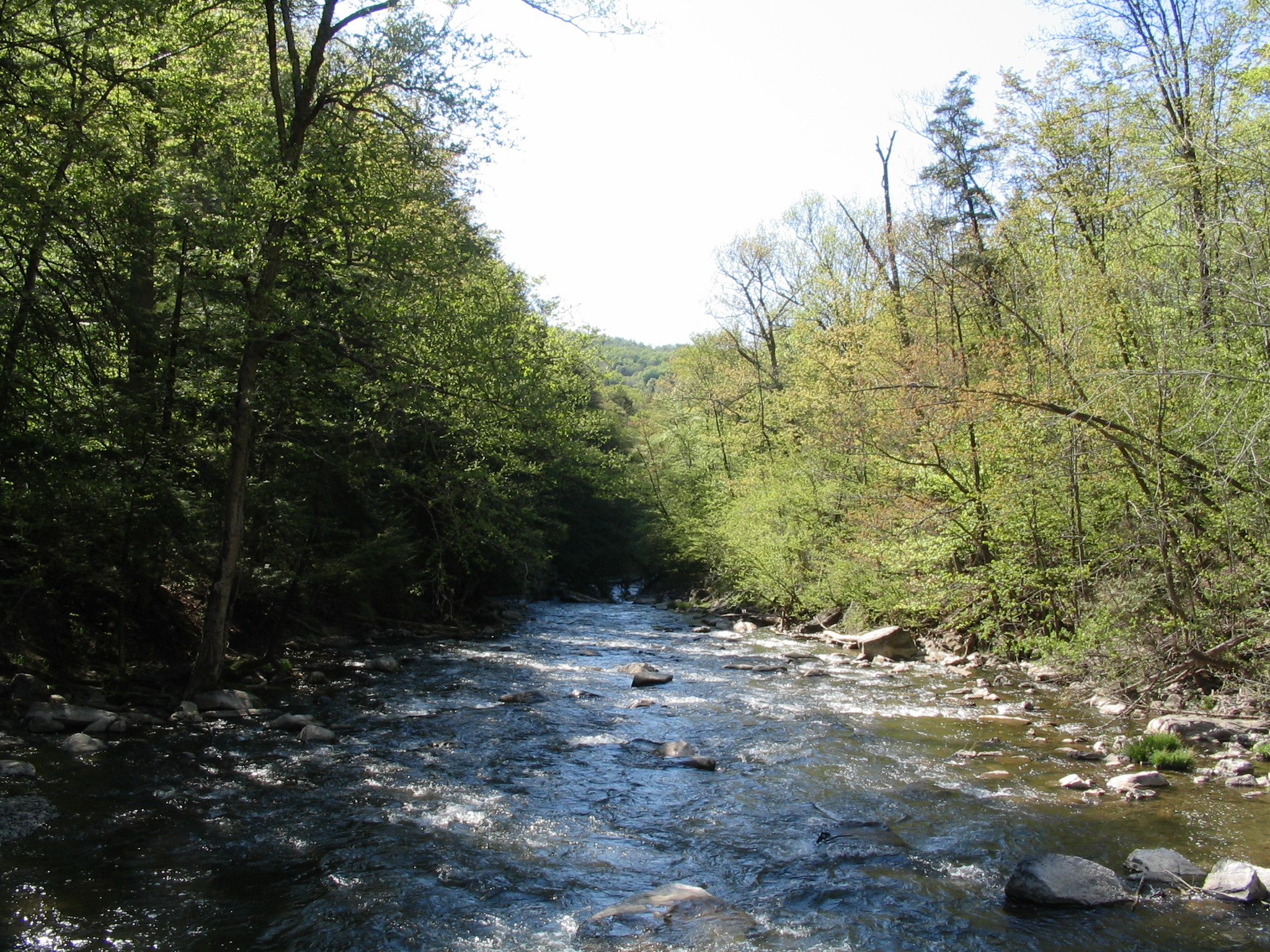
Chittenango Creek flowing away from the falls in May.

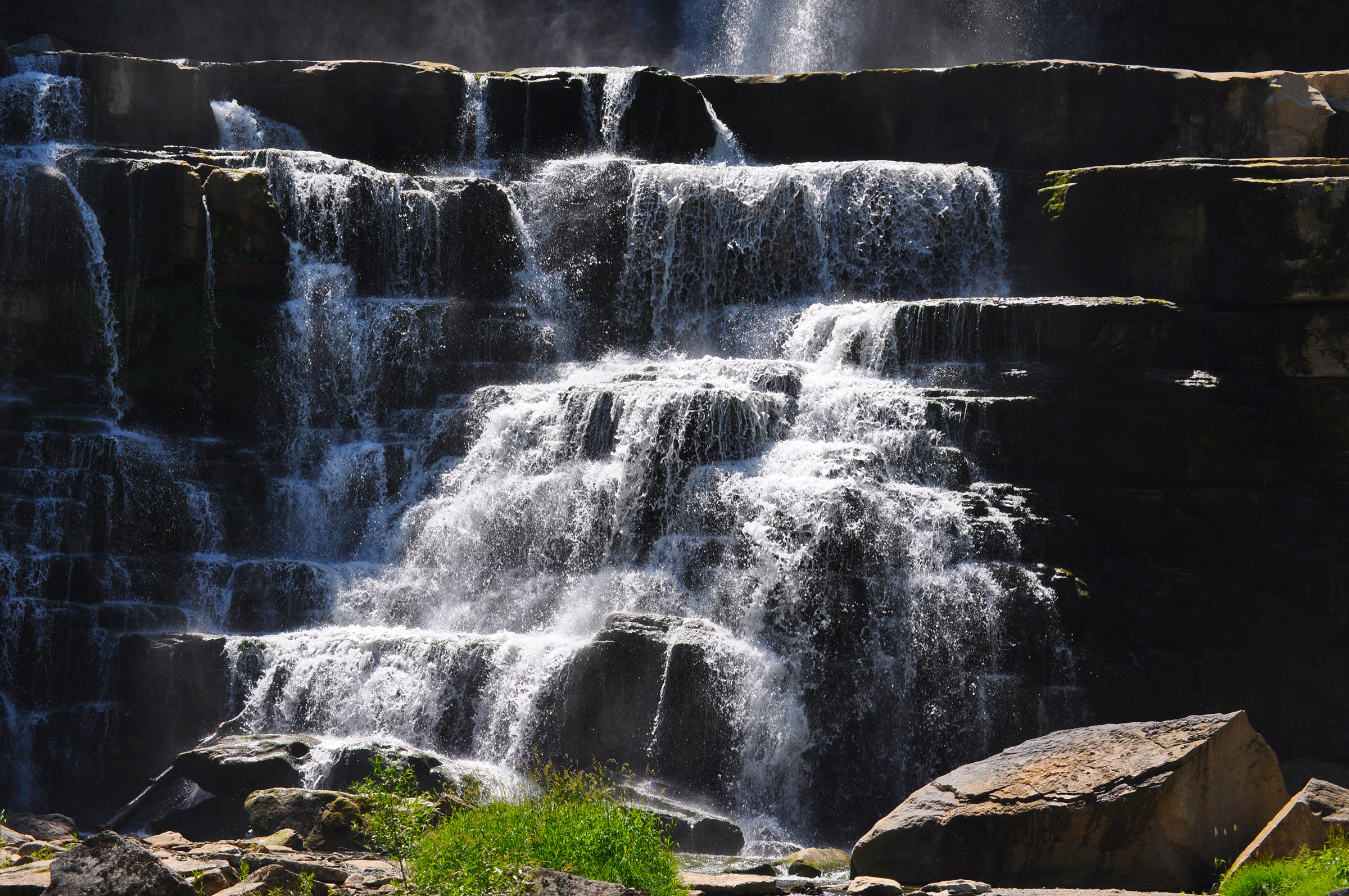
Chittenango Falls' lower portion, as viewed from the bridge.

== See also ==
Chittenango Falls Rec. 4K Multi-Filters May 15, 2017

- List of New York state parks
- List of waterfalls
- Perryville Falls
