= Cazenovia Village Historic District =

Historic district in New York, United States

- U.S. National Register of Historic Places
- U.S. Historic district
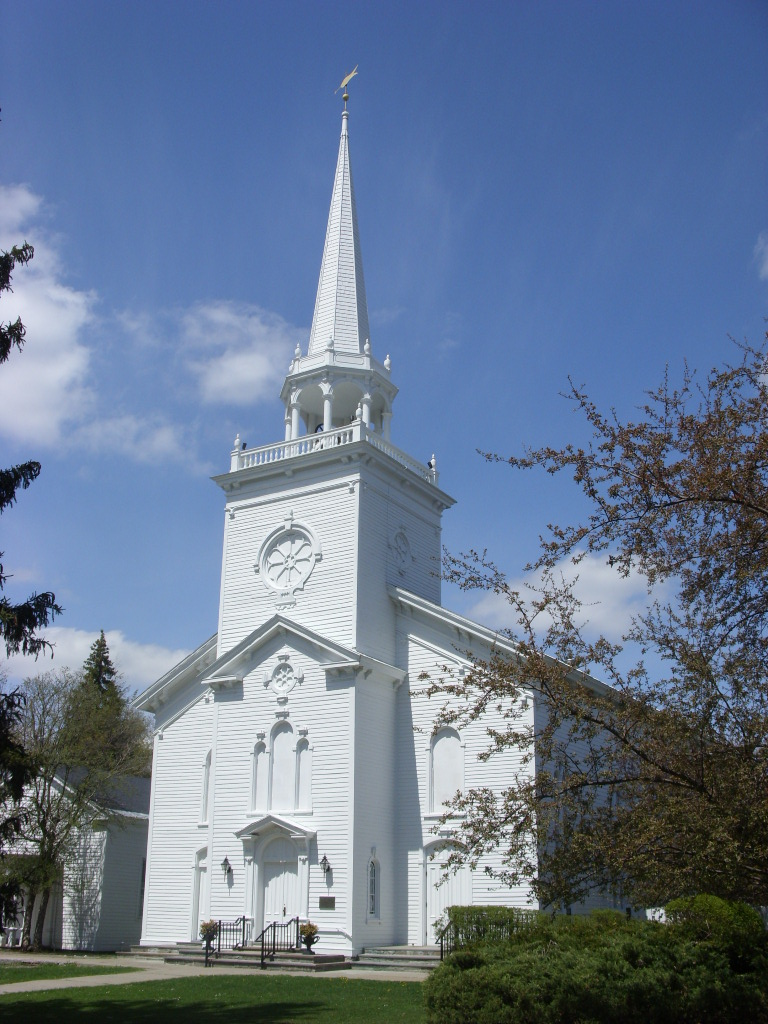
- First Presbyterian Church, Cazenovia NY, May 2009

- Location within New York Location within the United States
- Location: Roughly bounded by Union, Lincklean and Chenango Sts., and Rippleton Rd. and Foreman St., Cazenovia, New York
- Coordinates: 42°55′43″N 75°51′24″W
- Area: 308.5 acres (124.8 ha)
- Architect: Forman, Samuel; Et al.
- Architectural style: Classical Revival, Greek Revival, Late Victorian
- MPS: Cazenovia Town MRA
- NRHP reference No.: 86001352
- Added to NRHP: June 19, 1986

Cazenovia Village Historic District is a national historic district located at Cazenovia in Madison County, New York. It was added to the National Register of Historic Places in 1986.

== Structures ==
The district contains 278 contributing buildings, one contributing site, and twelve contributing structures. It consists of a wide variety of residential, commercial, civic, and ecclesiastical buildings built in popular architectural styles dating from about 1790 to 1935.

The Fugitive Slave Convention was held in Cazenovia in 1850.

== See also ==
- List of National Register of Historic Places in Cazenovia, New York
