= Fenner Baptist Church =

Historic church in New York, United States

- U.S. National Register of Historic Places
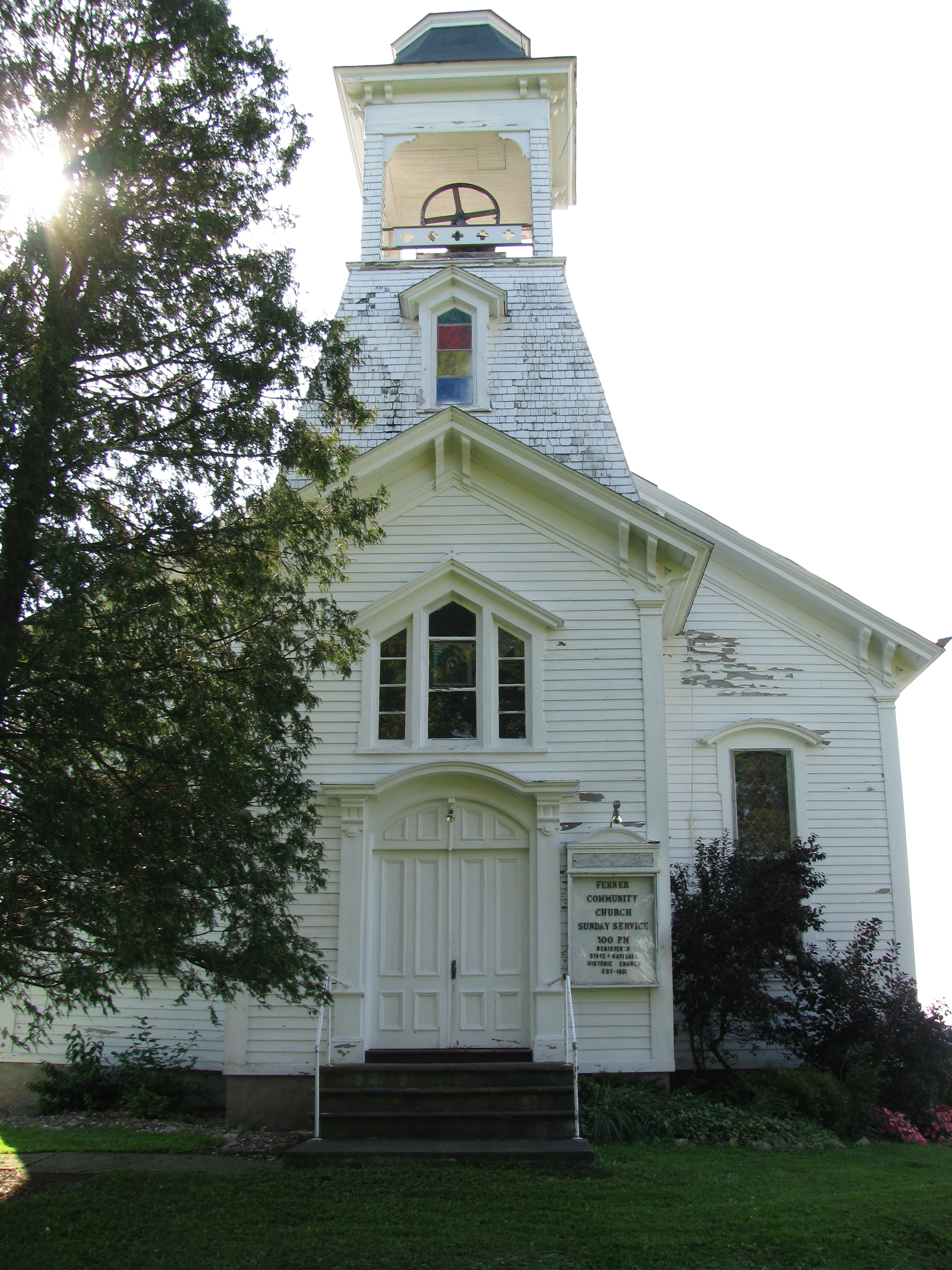

- Location within New York Location within the United States
- Location: 3122 Bingley Rd., Fenner, New York
- Coordinates: 42°58′9″N 75°47′17″W
- Area: less than one acre
- Built: 1821
- Architectural style: Federal, Second Empire
- NRHP reference No.: 01001501
- Added to NRHP: January 24, 2002

Fenner Baptist Church, also known as Fenner Community Church, is a historic Baptist church at 3122 Bingley Road in Fenner, New York. The original section of the church was built in 1820–1821 and is a 40 by 50 feet (12 by 15 m) and is a heavy hand-hewn, timber-frame structure. In the 1870s, the building was expanded by 10 feet (3.0 m) and acquired an overlay of Second Empire stylistic elements. The resultant building is three bays wide and four bays deep, with a gable roof and engaged, projecting central tower.

It was listed on the National Register of Historic Places in 2002.
