= Albany Street Historic District =

Historic district in New York, United States

- U.S. National Register of Historic Places
- U.S. Historic district
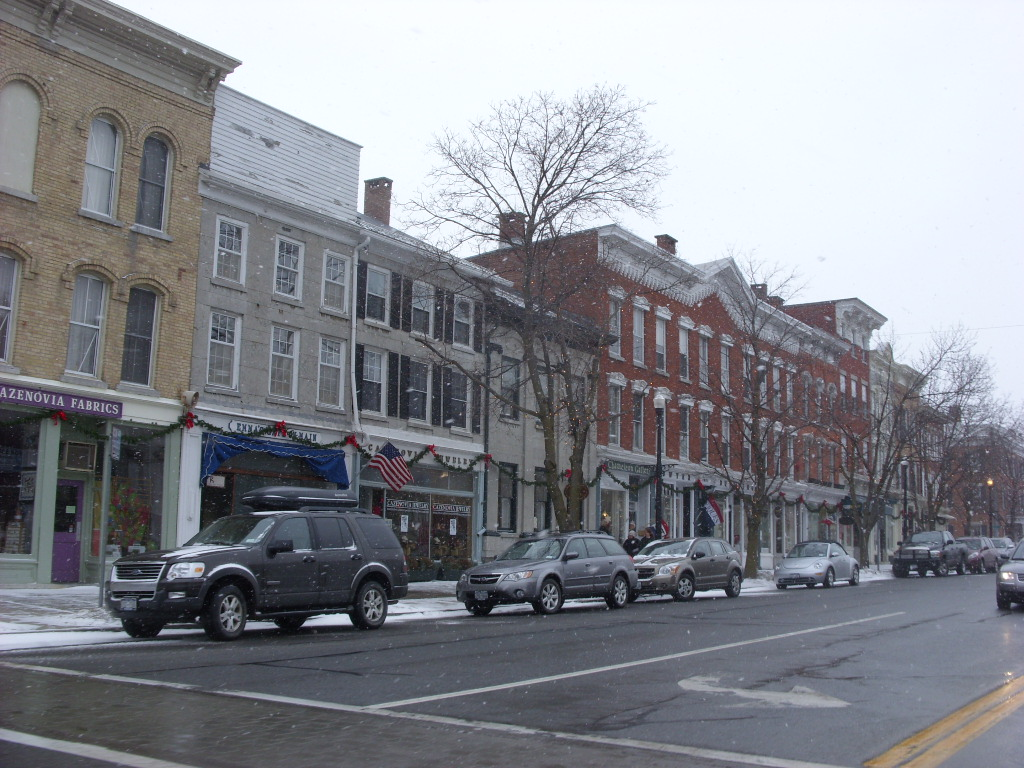
- Downtown Cazenovia, December 2008

- Location within New York Location within the United States
- Location: Irregular pattern along Albany St., Cazenovia, New York
- Coordinates: 42°55′47″N 75°51′19″W
- Area: 25.5 acres (10.3 ha)
- Architect: Lincklaen, John
- Architectural style: Greek Revival, Italianate, Neoclassical
- NRHP reference No.: 78001859
- Added to NRHP: October 10, 1978

Albany Street Historic District is a national historic district located at Cazenovia in Madison County, New York. The district contains 68 contributing buildings. It encompasses the central commercial district of the village and neighboring residential areas including the village green and public library.

It was added to the National Register of Historic Places in 1978.
