= Lincoln, New York =

- Town
- Location within New York Location within the United States
- Coordinates: 43°2′30″N 75°44′21″W
- Country: United States
- State: New York
- County: Madison

Government
  - Type: Town Council
  - Town Supervisor: Melissa During (R)
  - Town Council: Members' List: • Doug Holdridge; • Wayne B. Hertel; • Melissa During; • Russell Blanchard

Area
  - Total: 25.02 sq mi (64.81 km^{2})
  - Land: 24.96 sq mi (64.65 km^{2})
  - Water: 0.058 sq mi (0.15 km^{2})
- Elevation: 1,020 ft (310 m)

Population (2020)
  - Total: 1,802
  - Density: 72.2/sq mi (27.9/km^{2})
- Time zone: UTC-5 (Eastern (EST))
  - Summer (DST): UTC-4 (EDT)
- ZIP Codes: 13043 (Clockville); 13032 (Perryville); 13421 (Oneida)
- Area code: 315
- FIPS code: 36-053-42422
- GNIS feature ID: 0979152
- Website: lincolnny.gov

Lincoln is a town in Madison County, New York, United States. The population was 1,802 at the 2020 census, down from 2,012 in 2010. The town is in the north-central part of the county.

== History ==
The town was established in 1896 from a division of the town of Lenox. The Klock family were early settlers.

The former Lenox District No. 4 Schoolhouse houses the Lincoln town hall. It was added to the National Register of Historic Places in 1996.

== Geography ==
Lincoln is bordered to the northeast by the city of Oneida. Clockville, at the center of the town, is 2 miles (3 km) south of the village of Canastota, 6 miles (10 km) southeast of the center of Oneida, and 22 miles (35 km) east of Syracuse.

According to the U.S. Census Bureau, the town of Lincoln has a total area of 25.0 square miles (65 km^{2}), of which 0.06 square miles (0.16 km^{2}), or 0.24%, are water. The town is drained by two north-flowing creeks: in the east Cowaselon Creek, and in the west Canastota Creek, which flows into Cowaselon Creek at Canastota. The entire town is part of the watershed of Oneida Lake.

== Demographics ==
Historical population
Census	Pop.	Note	%±
1900	1,052		—
1910	985		−6.4%
1920	821		−16.6%
1930	869		5.8%
1940	853		−1.8%
1950	924		8.3%
1960	1,102		19.3%
1970	1,168		6.0%
1980	1,722		47.4%
1990	1,669		−3.1%
2000	1,818		8.9%
2010	2,012		10.7%
2020	1,802		−10.4%
U.S. Decennial Census

As of the census of 2000, there were 1,818 people, 663 households, and 493 families residing in the town. The population density was 72.8 inhabitants per square mile (28.1/km^{2}). There were 700 housing units at an average density of 28.0 per square mile (10.8/km^{2}). The racial makeup of the town was 97.96% White, 0.22% African American, 0.55% Native American, 0.39% Asian, 0.33% from other races, and 0.55% from two or more races. Hispanic or Latino of any race were 0.66% of the population.

There were 663 households, out of which 35.1% had children under the age of 18 living with them, 62.7% were married couples living together, 6.9% had a female householder with no husband present, and 25.5% were non-families. 19.2% of all households were made up of individuals, and 4.7% had someone living alone who was 65 years of age or older. The average household size was 2.74 and the average family size was 3.11.

In the town, the population was spread out, with 26.1% under the age of 18, 6.6% from 18 to 24, 31.8% from 25 to 44, 26.4% from 45 to 64, and 9.1% who were 65 years of age or older. The median age was 37 years. For every 100 females, there were 108.5 males. For every 100 females age 18 and over, there were 106.1 males.

The median income for a household in the town was $46,023, and the median income for a family was $50,000. Males had a median income of $35,625 versus $25,821 for females. The per capita income for the town was $20,751. About 3.6% of families and 5.1% of the population were below the poverty line, including 5.5% of those under age 18 and 8.2% of those age 65 or over.

== Communities and locations in Lincoln ==
- Alene – A hamlet by the southern town line.
- Clockville – This hamlet is the main community in the town and is named after the Klock family, early settlers. It is the location of the Lincoln Town Hall.
- Cottons – A hamlet located west of Clockville.
- Lenox – A hamlet located east-northeast of Clockville.
- Mirrellsville – A hamlet in the southeast of the town.
- Perryville – A hamlet on the town line in the southwestern corner of the town; partially in the town of Fenner.
