= Lenox District No. 4 Schoolhouse =

- U.S. National Register of Historic Places
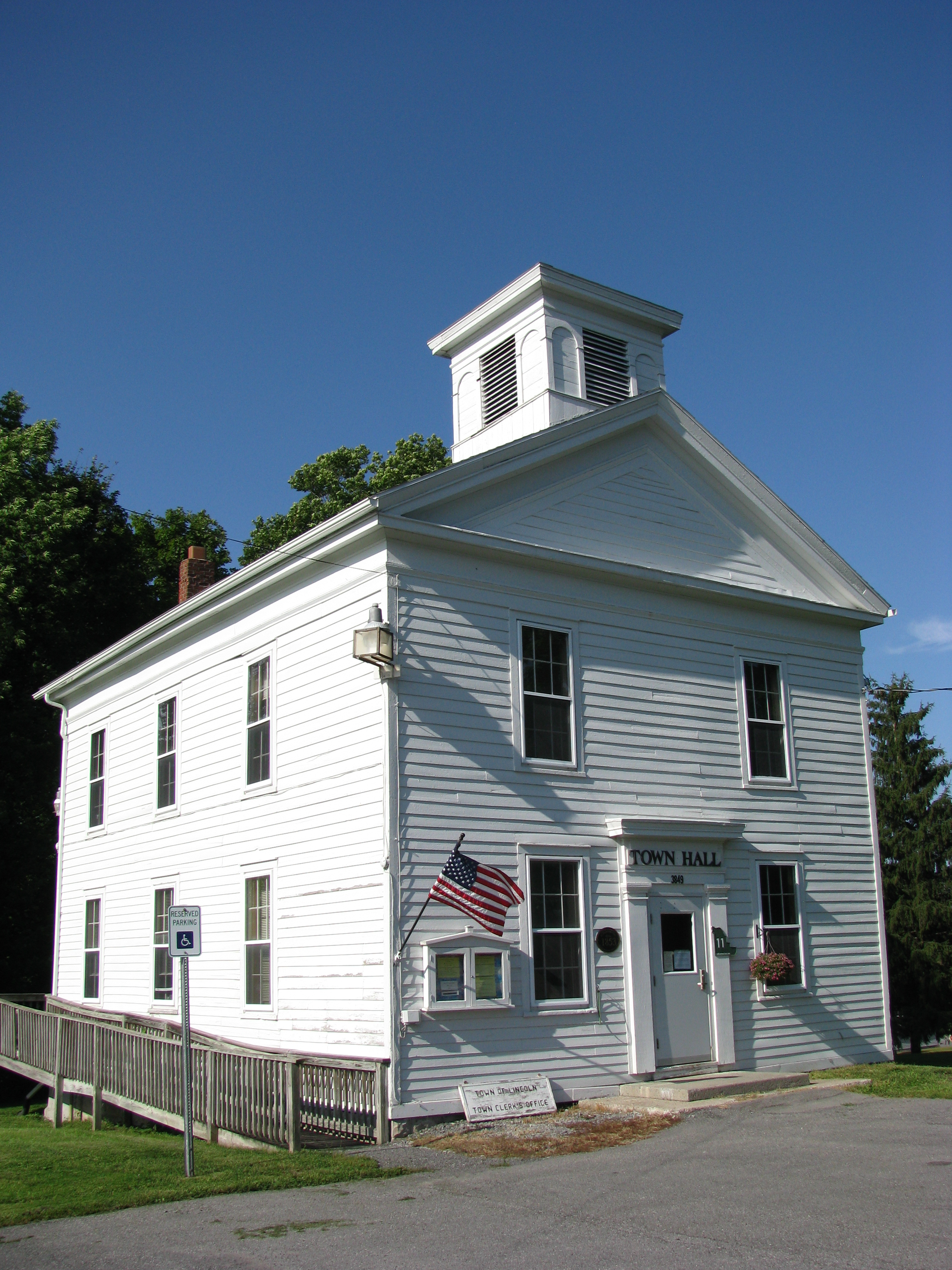

- Location within New York Location within the United States
- Location: Timmerman Rd. N side, at jct. with Old Co. Rd., Clockville, New York
- Coordinates: 43°2′31″N 75°44′32″W
- Area: 1.3 acres (0.53 ha)
- Built: 1854
- Architect: Russell, Miles
- Architectural style: Greek Revival
- NRHP reference No.: 96000135
- Added to NRHP: February 23, 1996

Lenox District No. 4 Schoolhouse, now known as Lincoln Town Hall, is a historic school building located at Clockville in Madison County, New York. It was built in 1854 and is a story clapboard frame structure on a concrete block foundation. It was remodeled in 1929–1930. It features a rooftop belfry containing the original 1970 schoolhouse bell.

It was added to the National Register of Historic Places in 1996.
