= Chittenango Creek =

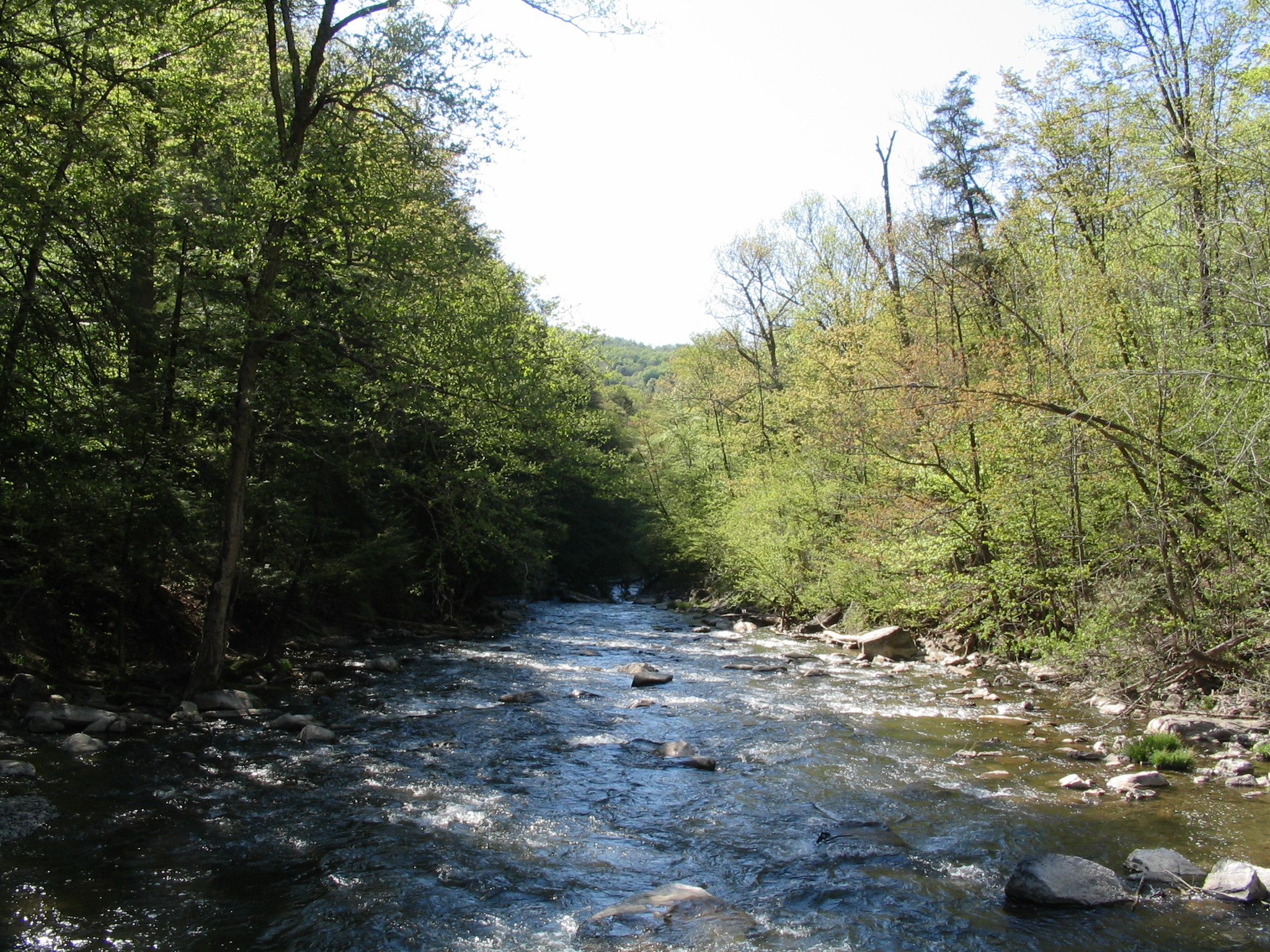
- Chittenango Creek, looking downstream at Chittenango Falls State Park

- Location of the mouth of Chittenango Creek in New York State Chittenango Creek (the United States)
- Native name: Chu-de-nääng′ (Oneida)

Location
- Country: United States
- State: New York
- Region: Central New York

Physical characteristics
- Source: Nelson Swamp
  - location: Town of Fenner, Madison County
  - coordinates: 42°57′31″N 75°45′13″W
- Mouth: Oneida Lake
  - location: Bridgeport
  - coordinates: 43°11′01″N 75°59′36″W

Basin features
- Progression: Chittenango Creek → Oneida Lake → Oneida River → Oswego River → Lake Ontario → St. Lawrence River → Gulf of St. Lawrence → Atlantic Ocean
- Tributaries
  - left: Cazenovia Lake, Limestone Creek
- Waterfalls: Chittenango Falls

Chittenango Creek is a small river in central New York, United States. The creek partially forms the boundary between Onondaga County and Madison County.

The Chittenango Creek watershed comprises about 290 square miles (750 km^{2}) of drainage in Onondaga and Madison counties. The median annual flow is estimated at 300 cubic feet per second (8.5 m^{3}/s).

== Course ==
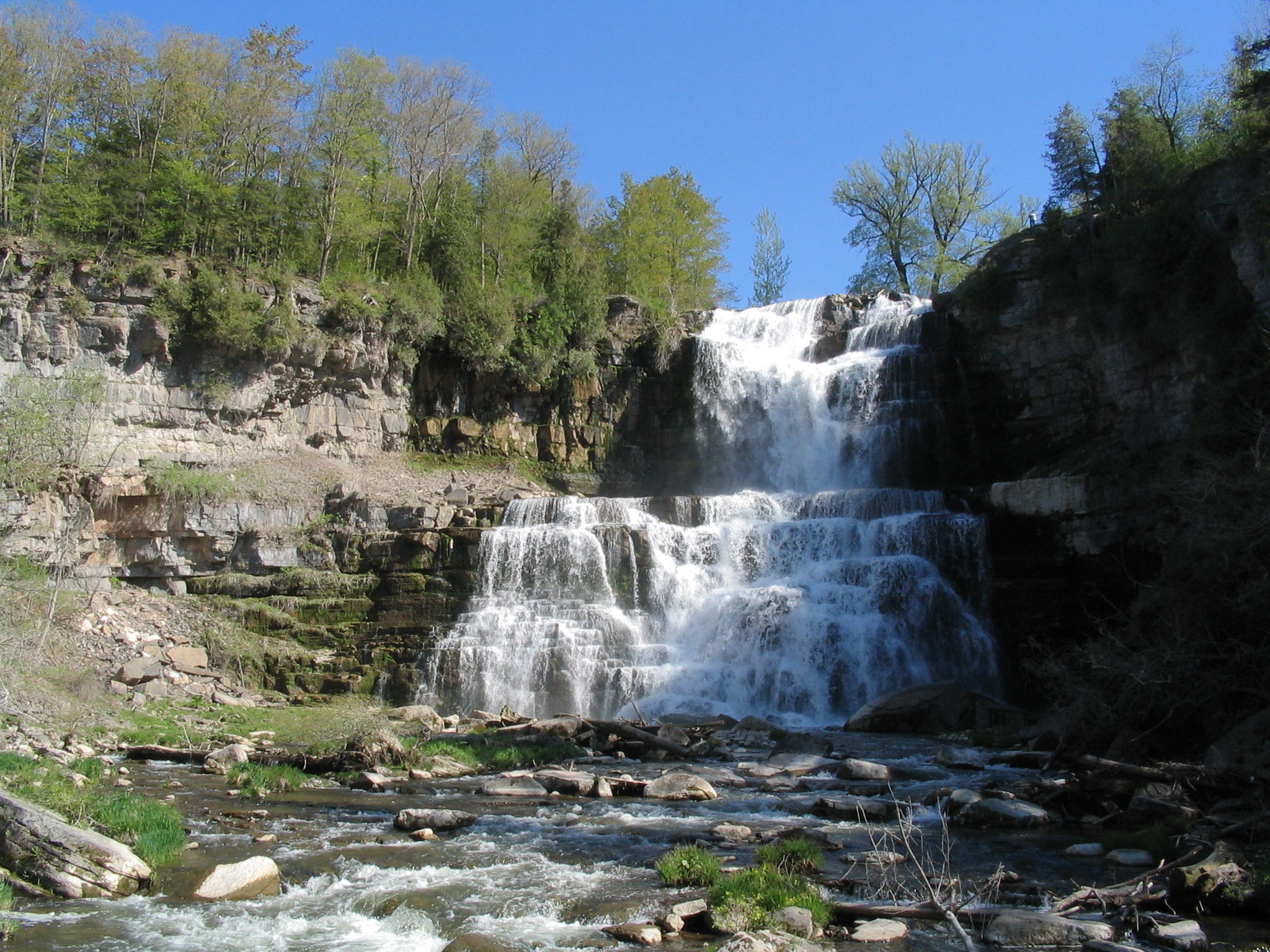
Chittenango Falls in May 2007

Chittenango Creek originates in Nelson Swamp in the town of Fenner in Madison County. It receives the outflow for Cazenovia Lake near the village of Cazenovia. From there it flows northward, passing over a 167-foot (51 m) waterfall in Chittenango Falls State Park before flowing through the village of Chittenango. The creek flows out into Oneida Lake near the community of Bridgeport.

=== Tributaries ===
- Limestone Creek
- Meadow Brook

== See also ==
- List of rivers in New York
