= Notleymere =

Historic house in New York, United States

- U.S. National Register of Historic Places
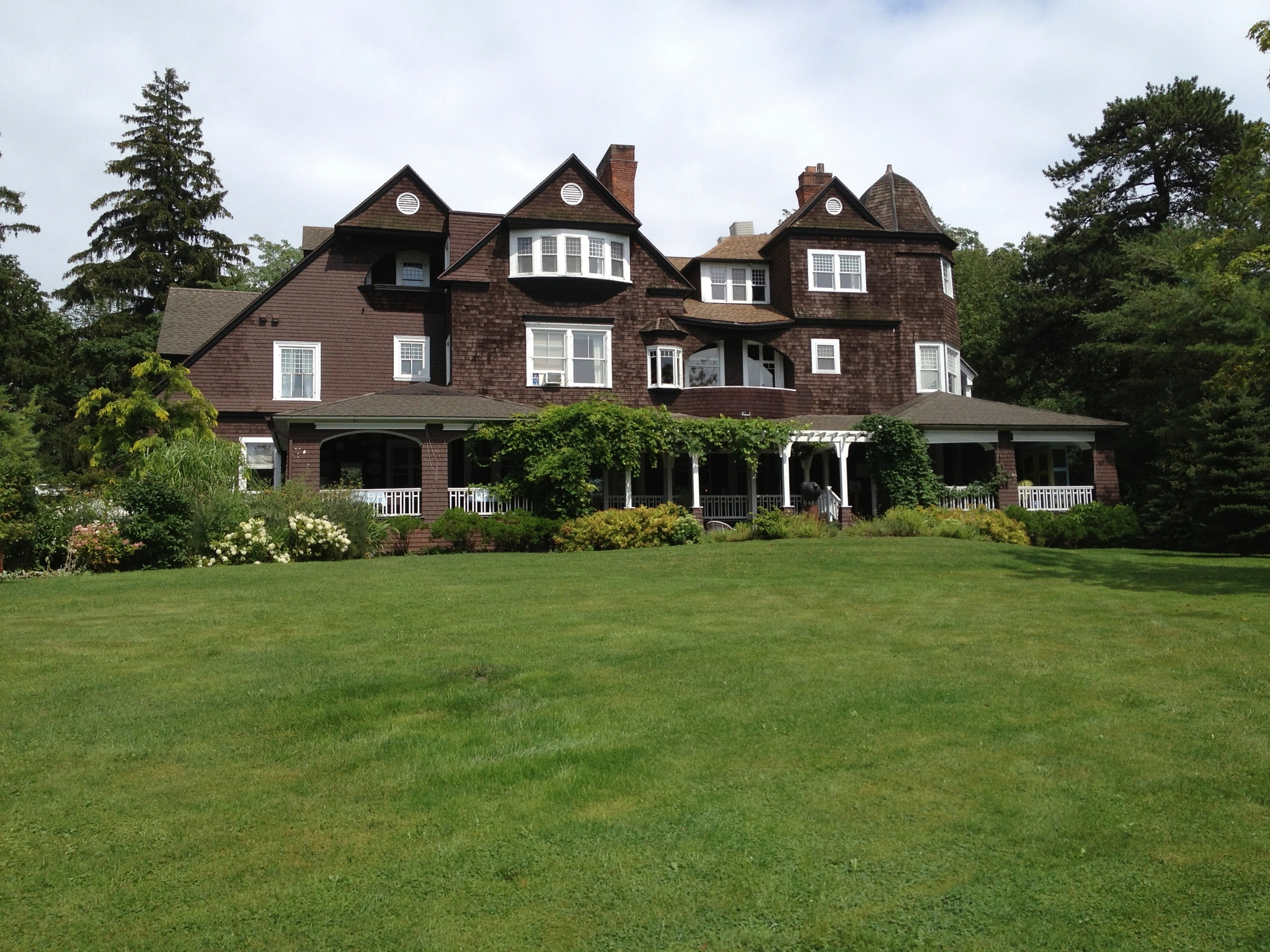

- Location within New York Location within the United States
- Location: 4641 E. Lake Rd., near Cazenovia, New York
- Coordinates: 42°56′52″N 75°51′47″W
- Area: 3.1 acres (1.3 ha)
- Built: 1885-89
- Architect: Robert W. Gibson; et al.
- Architectural style: Queen Anne, Shingle Style
- MPS: Cazenovia Town MRA
- NRHP reference No.: 91000868
- Added to NRHP: July 15, 1991

Notleymere (1885–89), also known as the Frank Norton estate, is a historic house located on the eastern shore of Cazenovia Lake in Cazenovia, Madison County, New York. The large, Shingle Style "summer cottage" was designed by architect Robert W. Gibson. It is a picturesque, asymmetrically massed, 3 1/2-story structure, sheathed in dark-stained wooden shingles and covered by a steeply pitched, multi-gabled, shingle roof. It features two tall, corbelled brick chimneys and a three-story polygonal turret.

The property was added to the National Register of Historic Places in 1991.

After acting as a Bed and breakfast for years, it was purchased in 2013. It was extensively remodeled in 2014–2015, updating the historic house to be used as a private residence owned by the DiFulgentiz family.

Several hundred yards north of it is another "summer cottage" on the National Register, Ormonde.
