= Perryville, New York =

- Hamlet
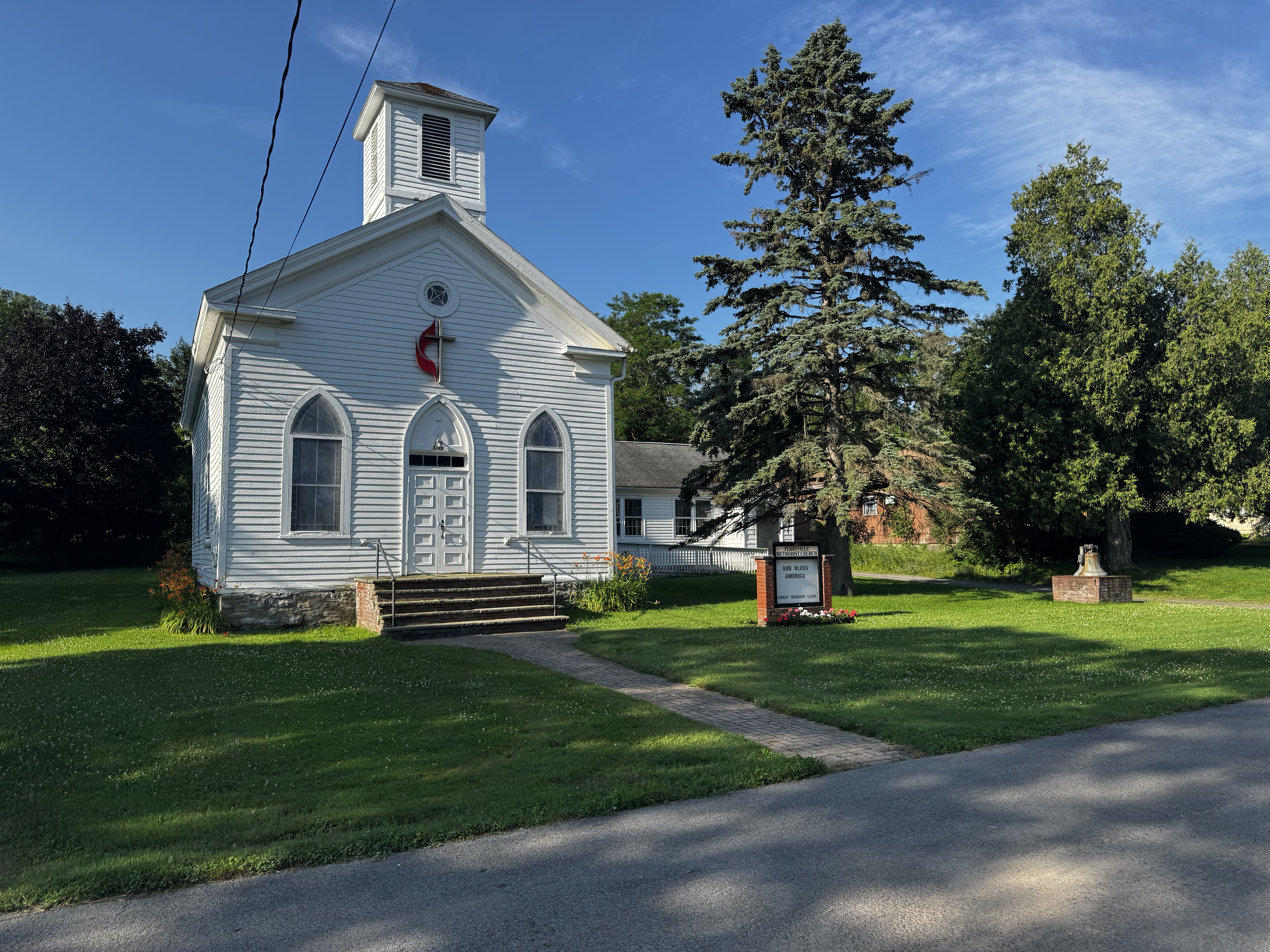
- The Methodist church in Perryville

- Location within New York Location within the United States
- Coordinates: 43°00′25″N 75°47′58″W
- Country: United States
- State: New York
- County: Madison
- Town: Lincoln
- Elevation: 1,086 ft (331 m)
- Time zone: UTC-5 (Eastern (EST))
  - Summer (DST): UTC-4 (EDT)
- ZIP code: 13032
- Area codes: 315 & 680
- GNIS feature ID: 960216

Perryville is a small hamlet in Madison County, New York, in the United States. The only remaining public building is the Methodist church.

Perryville Falls is located nearby.
