= Elmira, Cortland and Northern Railroad =

Overview
- Dates of operation: 1884–1905
- Predecessor: Cazenovia, Canastota and DeRuyter Railroad; Utica, Ithaca and Elmira Railroad
- Successor: Lehigh Valley Railroad

Technical
- Track gauge: 4 ft 8 1/2 in (1,435 mm)
- Length: 139.2 miles (224.0 km)

The Elmira, Cortland and Northern Railroad was a railroad in the state of New York, in the United States. Its main line ran from Elmira, New York, to Camden, New York. It was formed in 1884 from the consolidation of other railroads and merged into the Lehigh Valley Railroad in 1905. Under the Lehigh Valley, it was known as the Elmira and Cortland Branch. Almost all of its former line has since been abandoned.

== History ==
The Elmira, Cortland and Northern Railroad (EC&N) was created on March 7, 1884 from the merger of two railroads, the Utica, Ithaca and Elmira Railroad (UI&E) and the Cazenovia, Canastota and DeRuyter Railroad (CC&D). The UI&E owned a line between Elmira and Cortland, New York, which had been built in sections between 1871 and 1881. The CC&D's line extended from Cortland north to Canastota, New York. The oldest segment, Cazenovia, New York, to Canastota, had been opened by the Cazenovia and Canastota Railroad on December 7, 1869. The company extended south to DeRuyter, New York, in 1878. The New York, Ontario and Western Railway closed the gap between DeRuyter and Cortland; the CC&D had trackage rights over this route and later leased it. The EC&N, via its wholly owned Canastota Northern Railroad subsidiary, extended its line north from Canastota to Camden in 1887. Financially troubled from the beginning, the company turned a small profit in 1889.

The much larger Lehigh Valley Railroad had completed its extension through the Finger Lakes area to Buffalo, New York, in 1892. Competition from the Lehigh Valley, particularly on coal, hindered the EC&N's growth. The potential of the EC&N to provider feeder traffic for its new line intrigued the Lehigh Valley, which purchased the company on February 20, 1896. A formal merger followed in 1905. Under the Lehigh Valley, the EC&N's Elmira–Camden line was known as the Elmira and Cortland Branch and managed as part of the railroad's Auburn Division.

== Elmira and Cortland Branch ==
The line from Elmira to Camden measured 139.2 miles (224.0 km). It interchanged with several other railroads, including the Delaware, Lackawanna and Western Railroad, Erie Railroad, New York, Ontario and Western Railway, Pennsylvania Railroad and the New York Central Railroad. The Lehigh Valley abandoned the section between Van Etten and Spencer, New York in 1933, as it was redundant to the parallel Ithaca Branch. A further abandonment occurred in 1935, between Spencer and East Ithaca, New York. Abandonment of the section between Horseheads, New York and Van Etten followed in 1938; thereafter, Lehigh Valley trains required trackage rights over the Erie to reach Elmira. Also abandoned in 1938 was the Canastota–Camden extension. Passenger service ended on the entire branch by 1941. The branch was cut back further, from Canastota to Cortland, in 1967. A washout in June, 1972 from Hurricane Agnes damaged the route between East Ithaca and Freeville, New York, which the bankrupt Lehigh Valley decided not to repair. Later abandoned, in 1975, was the remaining track between Elmira and Horseheads. The sole remnant of the branch, between Freeville and Cortland, was incorporated into Conrail in 1976. Conrail would abandon all but 3 miles (4.8 km), within the vicinity of Cortland. This line is now owned by the New York, Susquehanna and Western Railway.
