= Cazenovia (village), New York =

Cazenovia, New York
- Village
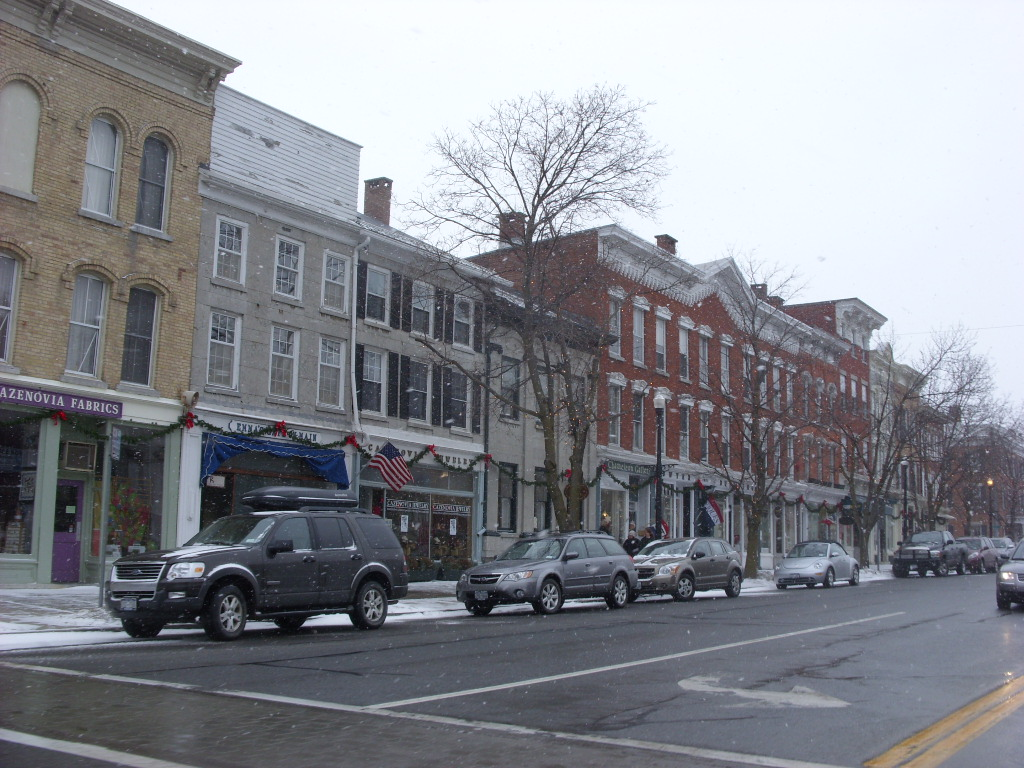
- Downtown Cazenovia in winter 2008

- Location within New York Location within the United States
- Coordinates: 42°55′53″N 75°51′4″W
- Country: United States
- State: New York
- County: Madison
- Town: Cazenovia

Area
  - Total: 1.89 sq mi (4.89 km^{2})
  - Land: 1.89 sq mi (4.89 km^{2})
  - Water: 0 sq mi (0.00 km^{2})
- Elevation: 1,224 ft (373 m)

Population (2020)
  - Total: 2,767
  - Density: 1,466.1/sq mi (566.06/km^{2})
- Time zone: UTC-5 (Eastern (EST))
  - Summer (DST): UTC-4 (EDT)
- ZIP Code: 13035
- Area code: 315
- FIPS code: 36-13145
- GNIS feature ID: 0946090
- Website: villageofcazenoviany.gov

Cazenovia is a village in the town of Cazenovia in Madison County, New York, United States. As of the 2020 census, the village had a population of 2,767. The village lies at the south end of Cazenovia Lake and is within a half hour of Syracuse. The village is located on US Route 20 and New York State Route 13, and was home to Cazenovia College.

== History ==
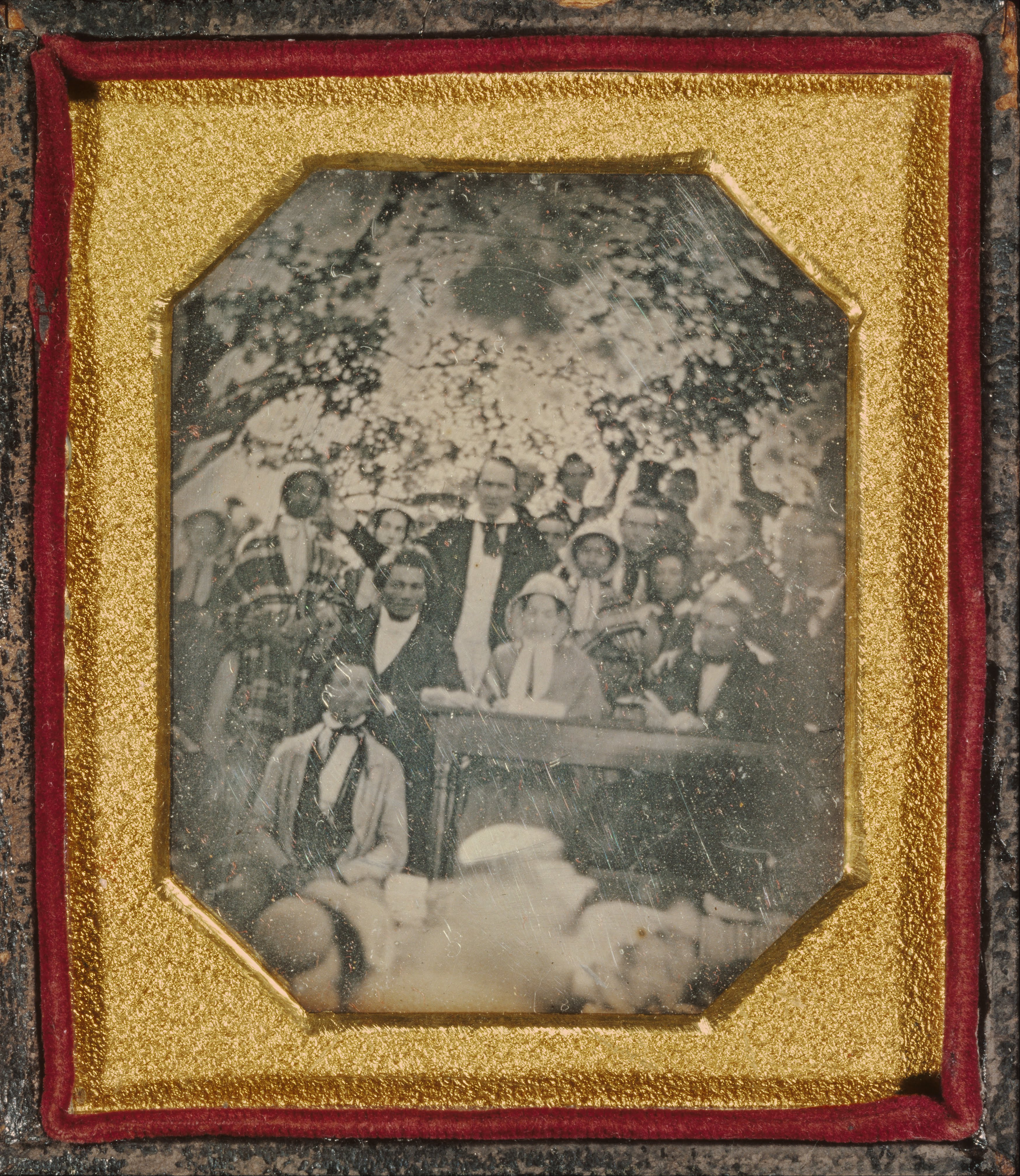
Daguerreotype made by Ezra Greenleaf Weld at the 1850 Fugitive Slave Convention in Grace Wilson's apple orchard on Sullivan Street

Cazenovia was established in 1794 by John Lincklaen, a young Dutch naval officer who purchased the town under the auspices of the Holland Land Company. Some of the first buildings established in Cazenovia were what is now the Presbyterian Church and the company store. The town is named after Theophilus Cazenove, an agent with the land company.

The village was incorporated in 1810 and was the first county seat (until 1817). Many of the village's historic buildings are encompassed by the Albany Street Historic District and Cazenovia Village Historic District. Also listed on the National Register of Historic Places is the Lehigh Valley Railroad Depot.

The most famous event in Cazenovia's history was the 1850 Fugitive Slave Convention, organized by abolitionist Gerrit Smith and chaired by former slave Frederick Douglass to consider how to react to the Fugitive Slave Act of 1850, which passed days later.

The Lorenzo State Historic Site was listed in the National Register of Historic Places in July 1970. This land, located off Route 13 (Rippleton Road), now belongs to the NY State Historic Trust after being bought from the previous owner, George Ledyard, upon his death. There is a school house, mansion, farmhouse, and a landscaped garden that guests can tour throughout the year by appointment or during regular hours.

On March 31, 2021, New York State legalized recreational cannabis. Villages cannot limit a resident's right to possess or consume cannabis, but villages can prohibit retail outlets from selling it. On July 1, 2021, the village board voted unanimously to opt out of allowing retail cannabis sales in the village. It was one of the first villages in the state to opt out.

== Geography ==
Cazenovia village is in western Madison County, in the center of the town of Cazenovia. It sits at the southeastern corner of Cazenovia Lake, a 4-mile-long (6 km) water body. U.S. Route 20 and New York State Route 13 pass through the village. US 20 leads east 11 miles (18 km) to Morrisville and west 15 miles (24 km) to LaFayette, while NY 13 leads north 9 miles (14 km) to Chittenango and south 15 miles (24 km) to DeRuyter. NY 92 has its southeastern terminus in Cazenovia and leads northwest 8 miles (13 km) to Manlius and 17 miles (27 km) to Syracuse.

According to the U.S. Census Bureau, the village of Cazenovia has an area of 1.89 square miles (4.90 km^{2}), all of it recorded as land. Cazenovia Lake has its outlet at the western border of the village; the outlet flows into Chittenango Creek, which runs south to north through the center of the village, then continues northward to flow into Oneida Lake near Bridgeport.

== Demographics ==
Historical population
Census	Pop.	Note	%±
1860	1,632		—
1870	1,718		5.3%
1880	1,918		11.6%
1890	1,987		3.6%
1900	1,819		−8.5%
1910	1,861		2.3%
1920	1,683		−9.6%
1930	1,788		6.2%
1940	1,689		−5.5%
1950	1,946		15.2%
1960	2,584		32.8%
1970	3,031		17.3%
1980	2,599		−14.3%
1990	3,007		15.7%
2000	2,614		−13.1%
2010	2,835		8.5%
2020	2,767		−2.4%
U.S. Decennial Census

As of the census of 2000, there were 2,614 people, 943 households, and 522 families residing in the village. The population density was 1,660.3 inhabitants per square mile (641.0/km^{2}). There were 1,031 housing units at an average density of 654.8 per square mile (252.8/km^{2}). The racial makeup of the village was 95.37% White, 2.41% Black or African American, 0.38% Native American, 0.54% Asian, 0.04% Pacific Islander, 0.27% from other races, and 0.99% from two or more races. Hispanic or Latino of any race were 2.75% of the population.

There were 943 households, out of which 25.6% had children under the age of 18 living with them, 43.5% were married couples living together, 9.5% had a female householder with no husband present, and 44.6% were non-families. 38.8% of all households were made up of individuals, and 20.7% had someone living alone who was 65 years of age or older. The average household size was 2.17 and the average family size was 2.93.

In the village, the population was spread out, with 18.1% under the age of 18, 26.1% from 18 to 24, 19.9% from 25 to 44, 20.1% from 45 to 64, and 15.8% who were 65 years of age or older. The median age was 32 years. For every 100 females, there were 73.1 males. For every 100 females age 18 and over, there were 67.9 males.

The median income for a household in the village was $43,611, and the median income for a family was $61,750. Males had a median income of $45,662 versus $30,893 for females. The per capita income for the village was $23,424. About 2.8% of families and 7.0% of the population were below the poverty line, including 4.5% of those under age 18 and 8.5% of those age 65 or over.

== Library ==
The Cazenovia Public Library is the village's public library, located at 100 Albany Street. In its original building it houses specimens and historical artifacts that have been donated to the library. It is part of the Mid-York Library System.

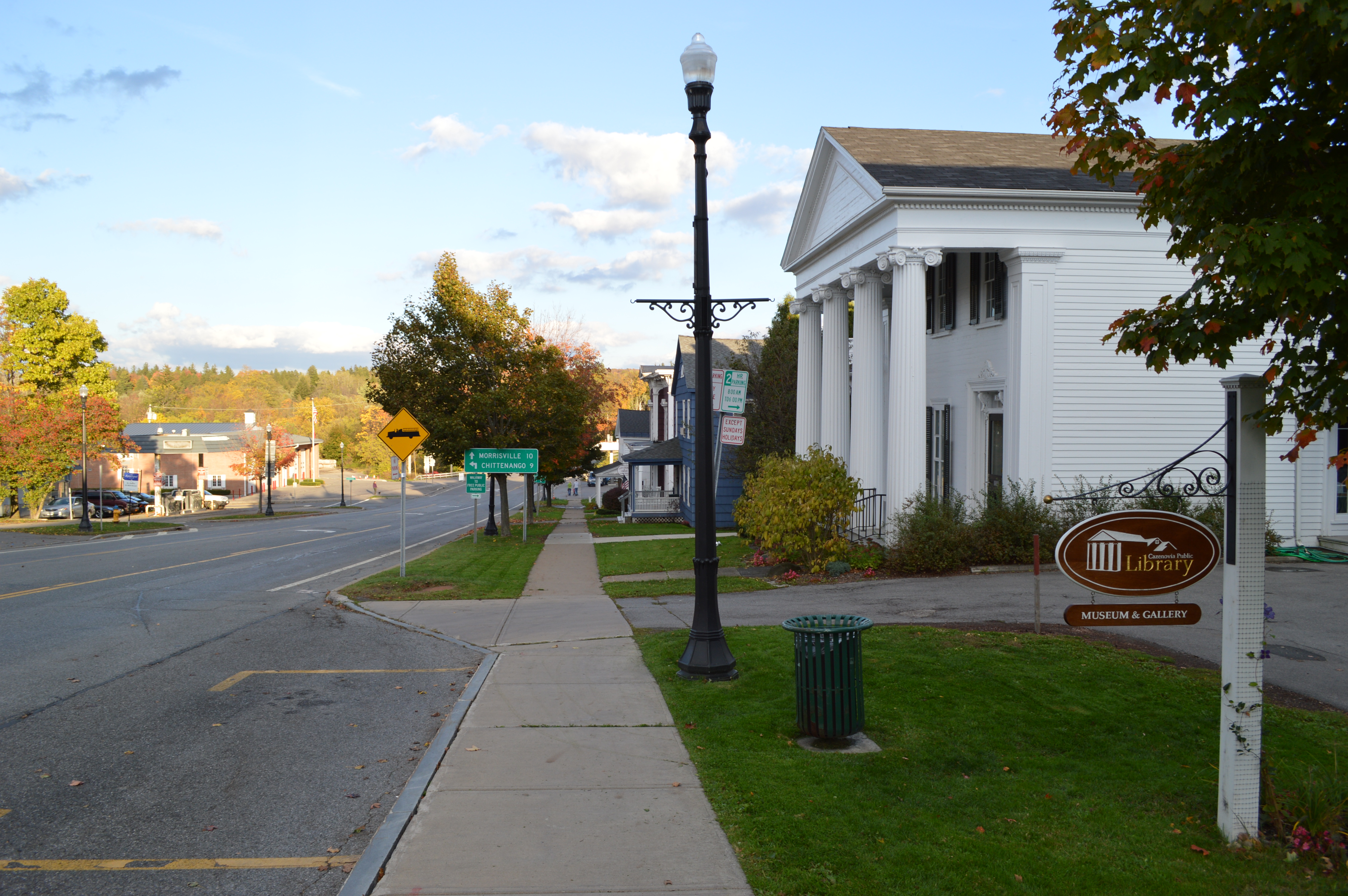
A side view of the library building

=== Library history ===
The first library in Cazenovia was started in 1828 by John Williams, a general store owner and merchant. His library "consisting of 200 vols." were lent to the public for free. It was not until 1886 that the Cazenovia Library Society was formed. Societies like it maintained their libraries "through membership, lending fees, and gifts".

In 1890, Robert J. Hubbard purchased and donated a house for the library's use. It had been built in 1830 in the Greek Revival style for John Williams. The ground floor of the house served as the main library building until a modern extension was built in 1996. Hubbard also donated his collection of souvenirs from his 1894 Grand Tour of Europe. One of the most notable artifacts he brought back was an ancient Egyptian mummy.

== Education ==
It is in the Cazenovia Central School District.

Cazenovia College was formerly located in the village.

== Notable people ==
- Anne Burrell (1969–2025), chef
- Charles S. Fairchild (1842–1924), Attorney General of New York, U.S. Secretary of the Treasury
- Ezra Greenleaf Weld (1801–1874), daguerrotypist

== See also ==
- Cazenovia College
