= Cazenovia Lake =

Lake in Madison County, New York, US

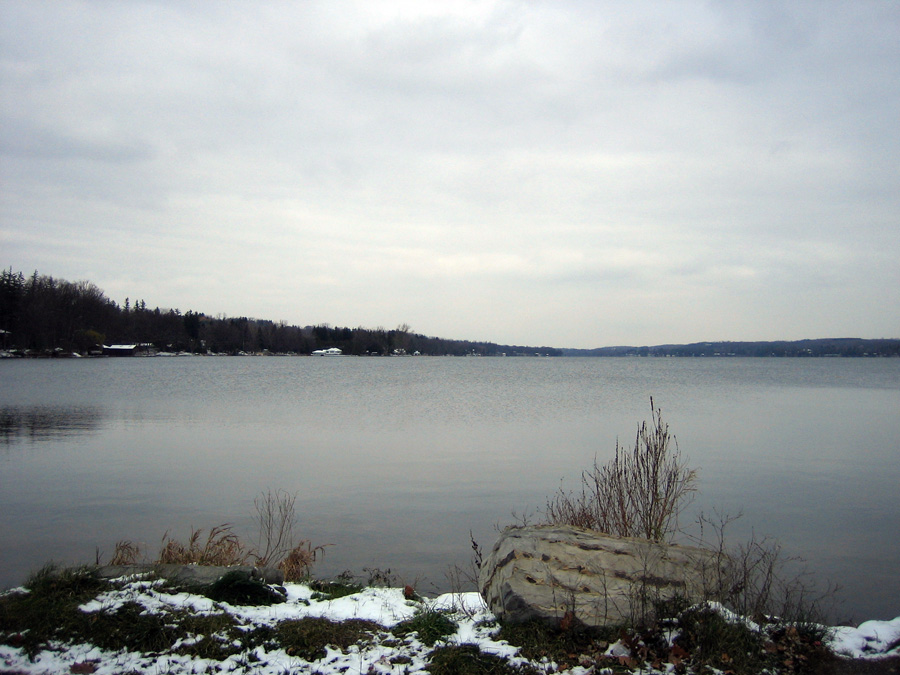

- Location within New York Location within the United States
- Location: Madison County, New York, United States
- Coordinates: 42°56′47.839″N 75°52′12.44″W
- Primary inflows: Swamplands to the north and underwater springs
- Primary outflows: Chittenango Creek
- Max. length: 3.9 mi (6.3 km)
- Max. width: 0.5 mi (0.80 km)
- Surface area: 1.8 sq mi (4.7 km^{2})
- Max. depth: 45 ft (14 m)
- Surface elevation: 1,191 ft (363 m)
- Settlements: Cazenovia

Cazenovia Lake (/ˌkæzɪˈnoʊviə/) is located in Madison County, New York. It is located 20 miles (32 km) southeast of the city of Syracuse. The village of Cazenovia is located southeast of the lake.

== History ==
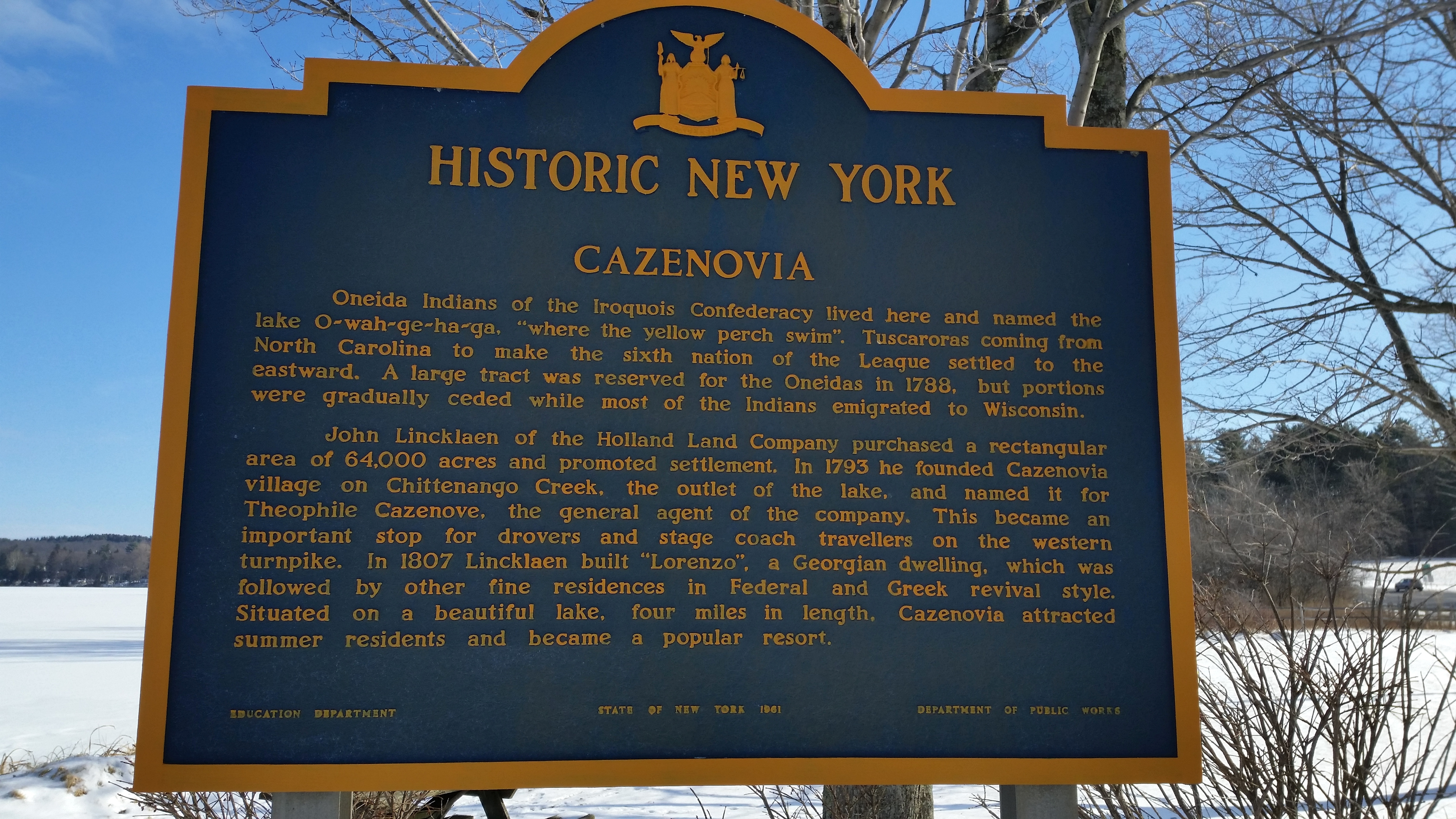
NYS Historic Marker at Cazenovia Lake

The lake resides in a valley created by sub-glacial runoff during the recession of North American continental glaciers at the end of the last glacial period.

Prior to European settlement of the area, Cazenovia Lake was known to the Oneida as Owagehaga or Owahgenah, and to the Onondaga as Hohwahgeneh, all of which mean "lake of the yellow perch". It was also previously known as "Canaseraga Lake".

== Description ==
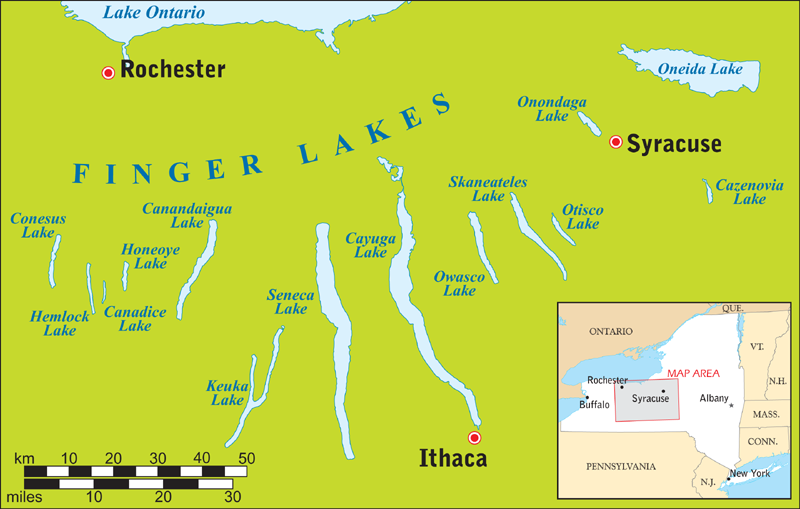
Map showing Cazenovia Lake in the upper right and the Finger Lakes in relation to Lake Ontario and upstate New York

Cazenovia Lake is roughly 3.9 miles (6.3 km) long and one-half mile (0.80 km) wide. It is 45 feet (14 m) at its deepest point. The lake's elevation is at 1,191 feet (363 m) above sea level. It is drained from its southeast corner by a canal to Chittenango Creek, which then flows north over Chittenango Falls and eventually into Oneida Lake's south shore in Bridgeport.

The lake contains largemouth and smallmouth bass, rock bass, chain pickerel, pumpkinseed, black crappie, bluegill, walleye, yellow perch, white sucker, and brown bullhead. The north end of the lake is swampy, making navigation with a motorboat difficult. The lake has been impacted by several invasive species, including Eurasian milfoil and zebra mussels.

Boating access for trailered boats is allowed by permit at Lakeside Park in the village of Cazenovia. An unofficial launch for canoes and kayaks is available at the undeveloped Helen L. McNitt State Park on the northeastern shore of the lake. Plans to improve the launch were announced in 2015.
