= Dry Dock Complex =

Dry Dock Complex may refer to:

- Chittenango Landing Dry Dock Complex
- Dry Dock Complex (Detroit)
- Haldia Dock Complex

== See also ==
- Dry dock
