= Green Lake (New York) =

Lake in New York

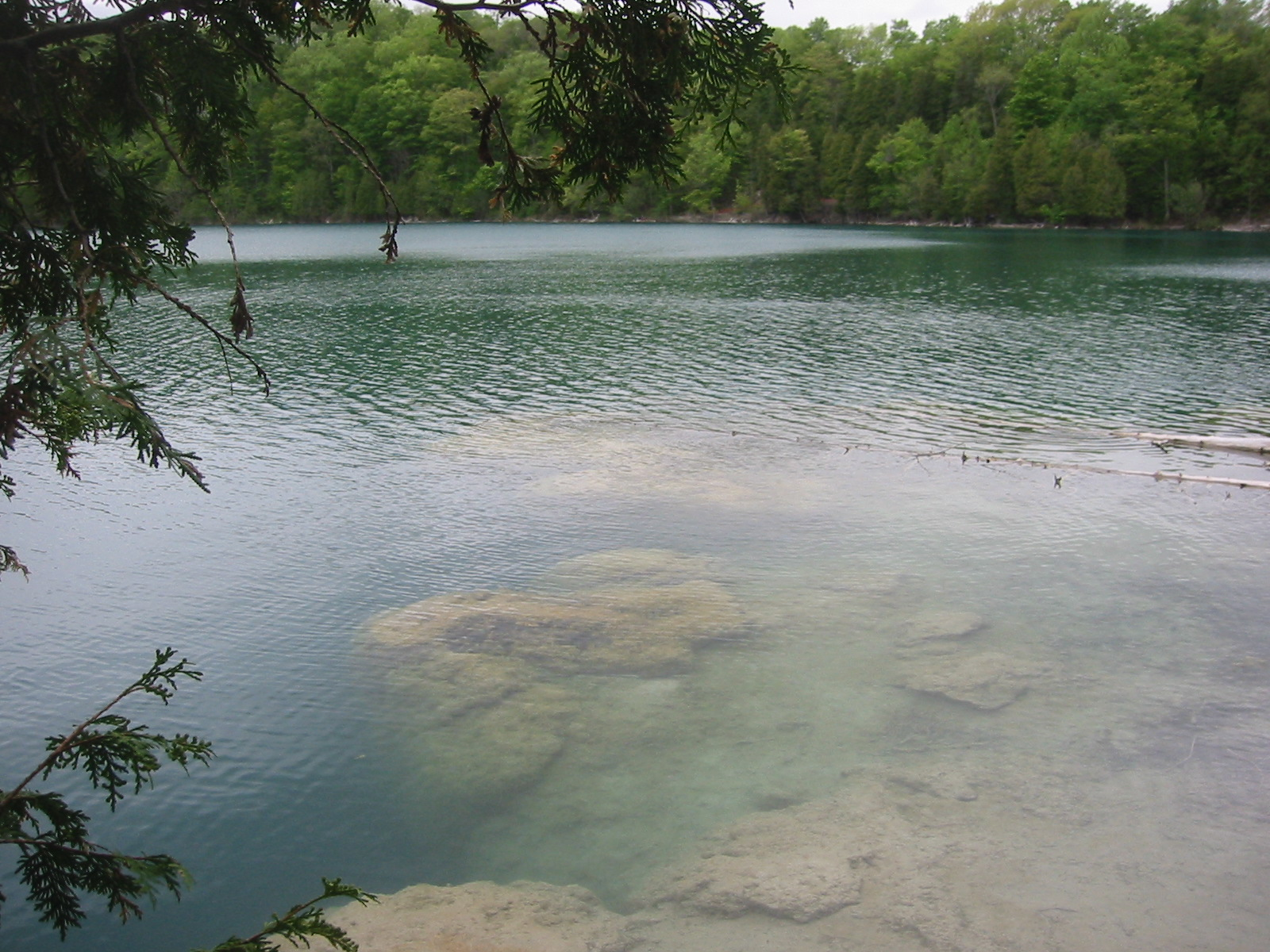
- Deadman's Point in May; a "marl reef" is visible in the water.

- Location within New York
- Location: Onondaga County, New York
- Coordinates: 43°03′00″N 75°57′58″W
- Lake type: Meromictic
- Primary inflows: Lake Brook
- Primary outflows: Lake Brook
- Basin countries: United States
- Max. length: .7 mi (1.1 km)
- Max. width: .15 mi (0.24 km)
- Surface area: 65 acres (0.26 km^{2})
- Average depth: 65 ft (20 m)
- Max. depth: 195 ft (59 m)
- Water volume: 7,235,900 m^{3} (5,866.2 acre⋅ft)
- Shore length^{1}: 1.8 mi (2.9 km)
- Surface elevation: 417 ft (127 m)
- ^{1} Shore length is not a well-defined measure.

Green Lake is the larger of the two lakes in Green Lakes State Park, which lies about 9 miles (14 km) east of downtown Syracuse in Onondaga County, New York. Round Lake is the smaller lake located west of Green Lake. Both lakes are meromictic, which means no seasonal mixing of surface and bottom waters occurs. Meromictic lakes are fairly rare; they have been extensively studied, in part because their sediments can preserve a historical record extending back thousands of years, and because of the euxinic (anoxic, sulfidic) conditions which can form in the deep water.

== Description ==
Green Lake has a maximum depth of 195 feet (59 metres). Deep lakes tend to appear bluish because the wavelengths of light that can penetrate (and be dispersed at) great depths are those closer to the blue end of the spectrum. Green Lake, in particular, appears green as a result of its high levels of calcium carbonate, which reflects the green wavelength. Because of its depth and the higher salinity of the basin waters, the lake is meromictic and does not turn over and intermix waters like many other lakes in this region do. Green Lake's cold and dense bottom waters tend to stay separate from the shallower, warmer waters. Because of this, sediment sinks and collects in the bottom and undergoes virtually no decay. Since the sediment is not disturbed by mixing, the lake does not take on a muddy, turbid appearance like other lakes do. Meromictic lakes also have still, mirror-like waters. Green Lake's tranquil, reflective water makes it photogenic. The lake is glacial in origin, likely developed by glacial meltwater during the most recent North American glaciation. Its calcium and sulfate-rich waters are due to groundwater percolating through marine shale with a high gypsum content. The lake, which resembles a large river in shape, is unusually deep for its size and was considered sacred by the native Onondaga tribe, which originally settled in the area.

== Fishing ==
Fish species present in the lake include rainbow trout, pumpkinseed sunfish, and brook trout. The lake is stocked annually with 4,000 rainbow trout, which are usually caught shortly after, in the early spring. Due to the anoxic conditions at and below the chemocline of the lake, all fish in the lake are confined to the upper 60 feet of water. Access is only by rental boats or shore fishing and New York state fishing regulations apply.

== History ==
Fayetteville Green Lake (FGL) was among the first lakes in North America identified as meromictic, and is the best-studied meromictic lake in the world, with records dating back to 1839. Green Lake was referred to as Lake Sodon by Lardner Vanuxem, who was the first to study Green Lake in 1839, and the presence of sulfide in the deeper waters of the lake was known by 1849. FGL is believed to have formed as a plunge pool during the late Wisconsin stage of glaciation at the base of a waterfall formed by the retreating glaciers, which is the reason for its extreme depth relative to a small surface area. The outflow for FGL runs underneath the Erie Canal, which is located within 300 m of the north shore of the lake. FGL is currently located in Green Lakes State Park, and since 1933, large quantities of sand have been dumped on the shore of the north end to create a swimming area.

== Biogeochemistry ==
Fayetteville Green Lake is located in the Oswego River-Lake Ontario drainage system, and receives surface water from Round Lake. The water column is chemically stratified into an oxygenated upper portion (mixolimnion) and a euxinic deeper portion (monimolimnion). The stratification is maintained through the large input of ground water rich in dissolved solids to the deeper portion of the lake. The difference in the dissolved solids (Ca, Mg, SO_{4}) between the water input to the surface and water input to the deep creates the permanent stratification observed. FGL has a sulfate concentration around 13.5 mmol/L (about half that of modern seawater) which is derived from groundwater input to the deep portion of the lake. A well-developed separation in a body of water due to differing chemistries is present between 18 and 20 m depth. The water below the chemocline is anoxic and sulfidic, and at the chemocline is a dense layer of purple sulfur bacteria which makes the water appear pink. The purple sulfur bacteria thrive in the anoxic waters and use the sulfide from the deeper water in their chemosynthesis. The color of the lake is created by the total dissolved solids (from the groundwater input) which disperse the sunlight creating a greenish color. Annual whiting events occur in FGL, due to the large Synechococcus population in the lake. Calcite precipitates in microenvironments surrounding the Synechococcus and this is believed to dominate the whiting events. Calcite precipitation is common year round at FGL, and this leads to the carbonate crust that surrounds most of the lake, and covers branches and other material that falls below the surface. Dead Man's Point is a notable example of this, and is classified as a thrombolitic bioherm.

== Geologic significance ==
The meromictic character of FGL is believed to represent a possible analog to ancient ocean environments during the Precambrian and during times of environmental stress. (i.e. mass extinction events). During these times, the oceans may have become anoxic and possibly sulfidic in the deep water. Studies have demonstrated that in general, meromictic lakes are valuable proxies for reconstructing ancient climate conditions due to their ability to preserve long-term environmental records. Information about past environments can be gained through studying isotopic, chemical, and biological compositions of modern FGL. FGL is the subject of multiple scientific studies per year. Recent work by Lee Kump at Penn State University has been featured on the television shows Nova: scienceNOW, National Geographic, and BBC relating FGL to the end-Permian mass extinction.

== Research ==
Green lake has long been the subject of extensive scientific research due to its unique meromictic characteristics, which offer insight into both modern-day ecosystems and ancient environmental conditions. Researchers from various disciplines, including geology, biogeochemistry, and environmental science, continue to study the lake's water chemistry, sedimentation, and biological diversity. Studies have shown that the lake's biogeochemical processes, including microbial sulfur cycling, make it a valuable site for understanding past and present environmental conditions.

Recent research has also focused on re-examining Green Lake's annual "whiting" events, where calcite precipitates in the water column. These events, linked to biological activity from cyanobacteria, offer insights into the lake's carbon and sulfur cycles. Researchers are also using advanced photogrammetry techniques to create 3D models of microbial biofilms, helping to visualize the distribution of microbial communities and their role in biogeochemical processes.

Additionally, studies have emphasized the importance of Green Lake's unique stratification, where differences in salinity, rather than temperature, maintain the meromictic layers. This permanent stratification leads to anoxic bottom waters that preserve ancient climate records, making Green Lake a valuable tool for studying past environmental changes. Microbialites in Green Lake, formed by microbial communities, provide insight into past microbial life. Recent studies using lipid biomarkers have shown the microbialites in Green Lake share similarities with those in the hypersaline Great Salt Lake (UT), revealing common microbial communities.
