= Old Erie Canal State Historic Park =

State park surrounding an old segment of the Erie Canal

Coordinates: 43°04′23″N 75°55′34″W

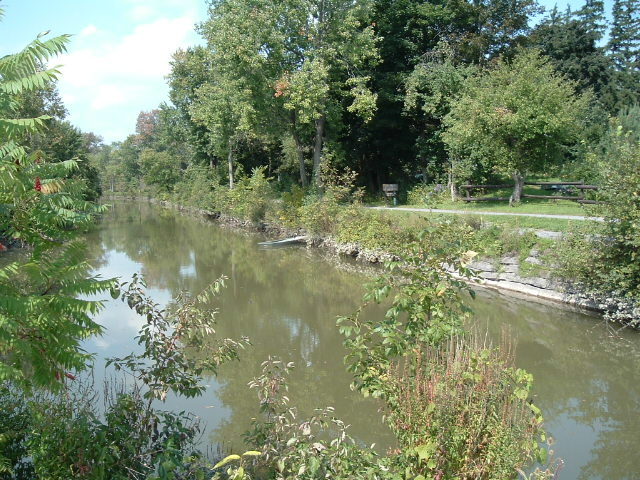
The Old Erie Canal and its towpath at Kirkville, New York, within Old Erie Canal State Historic Park.

The Old Erie Canal State Historic Park encompasses a 36-mile (58 km) linear segment of the original Erie Canal's Long Level section. It extends westward from Butternut Creek in the town of DeWitt, just east of Syracuse, to the outskirts of Rome, New York. The park includes restored segments of the canal's waterway and towpath which were in active use between 1825 and 1917. It is part of the New York State Park system.

== Access ==
The towpath has been resurfaced with asphalt and stone dust and is suitable for biking, hiking, horseback riding or snowmobiling. The canal also is navigable by canoe or kayak for short segments throughout the park. All-terrain vehicles (ATVs) and motorcycles are not permitted, and no campsites are available in the park, although camping is available at Green Lakes State Park east of Syracuse, which is closely adjacent to Old Erie Canal State Park. Several picnic areas are available on the route and are accessible via nearby roads.

== Route ==
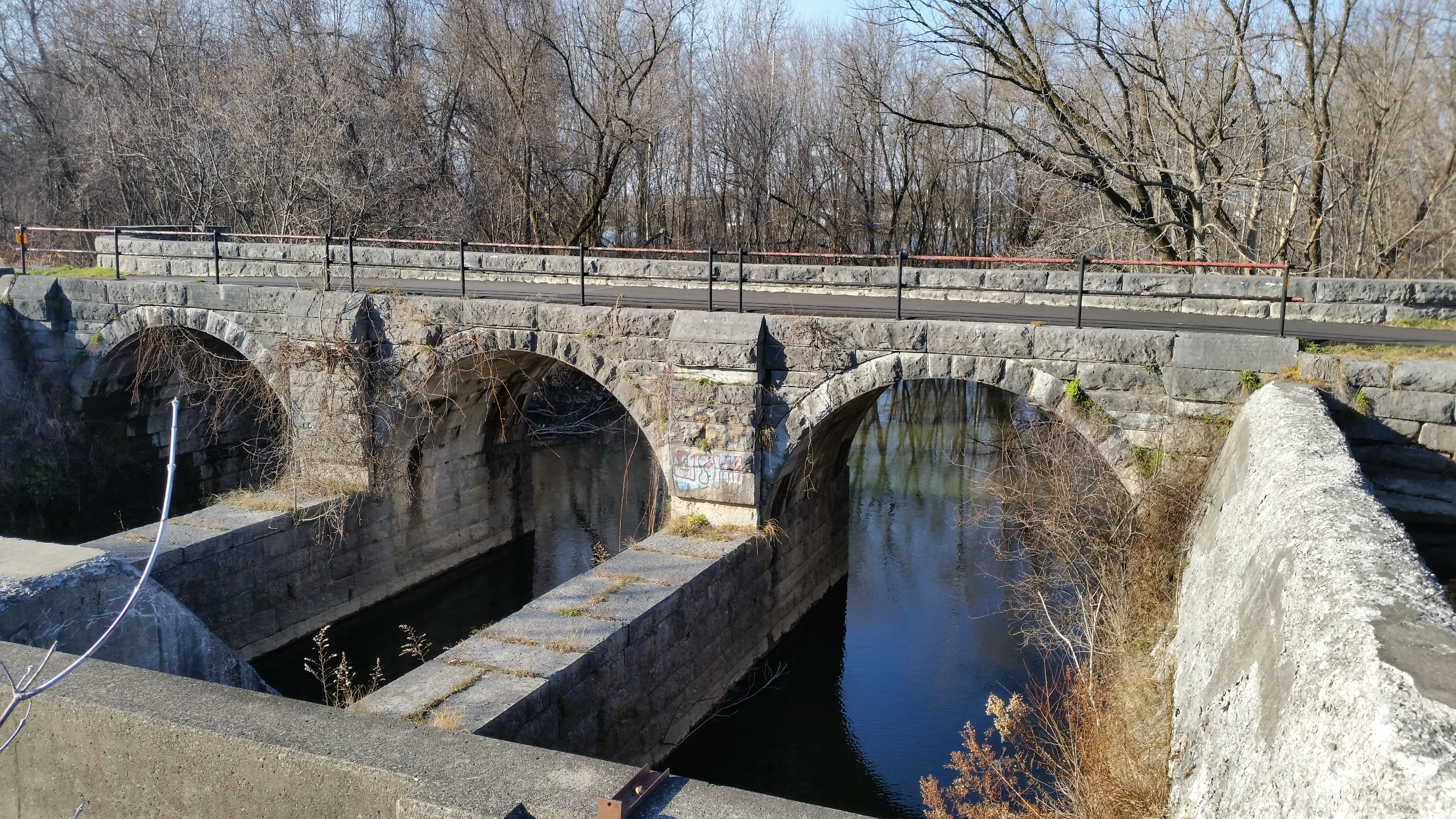
Limestone Creek at the Old Erie Canal, Town of Manlius, NY

The 1,191-acre (4.82 km^{2}) park lies within Madison, Oneida, and Onondaga counties. The park passes near or through several communities, including Fayetteville, Manlius Center, Kirkville, Chittenango, Canastota, Durhamville and New London.

Five miles (8.0 km) east of Butternut Creek, the canal passes by the entrance to Green Lakes State Park.

The park's terminus is at the Erie Canal Village, a now defunct privately operated museum and historic recreation of a 19th-century canal village located outside of Rome, which featured a 2 ft (610 mm) narrow gauge railway.

== Connecting trails ==
Other trails connecting with the Old Erie Canal towpath trail include:

- Butternut Creek Recreation and Nature Trail, DeWitt
- Fayetteville Feeder Towpath, Fayetteville
- Chittenango Creek Walk, Chittenango
- North Country Trail, Canastota (Concurrent east of Canastota to Rome)
- Oneida Rail Trail, Oneida
- Rome Canalway Towpath, Rome

== Nearby parks ==
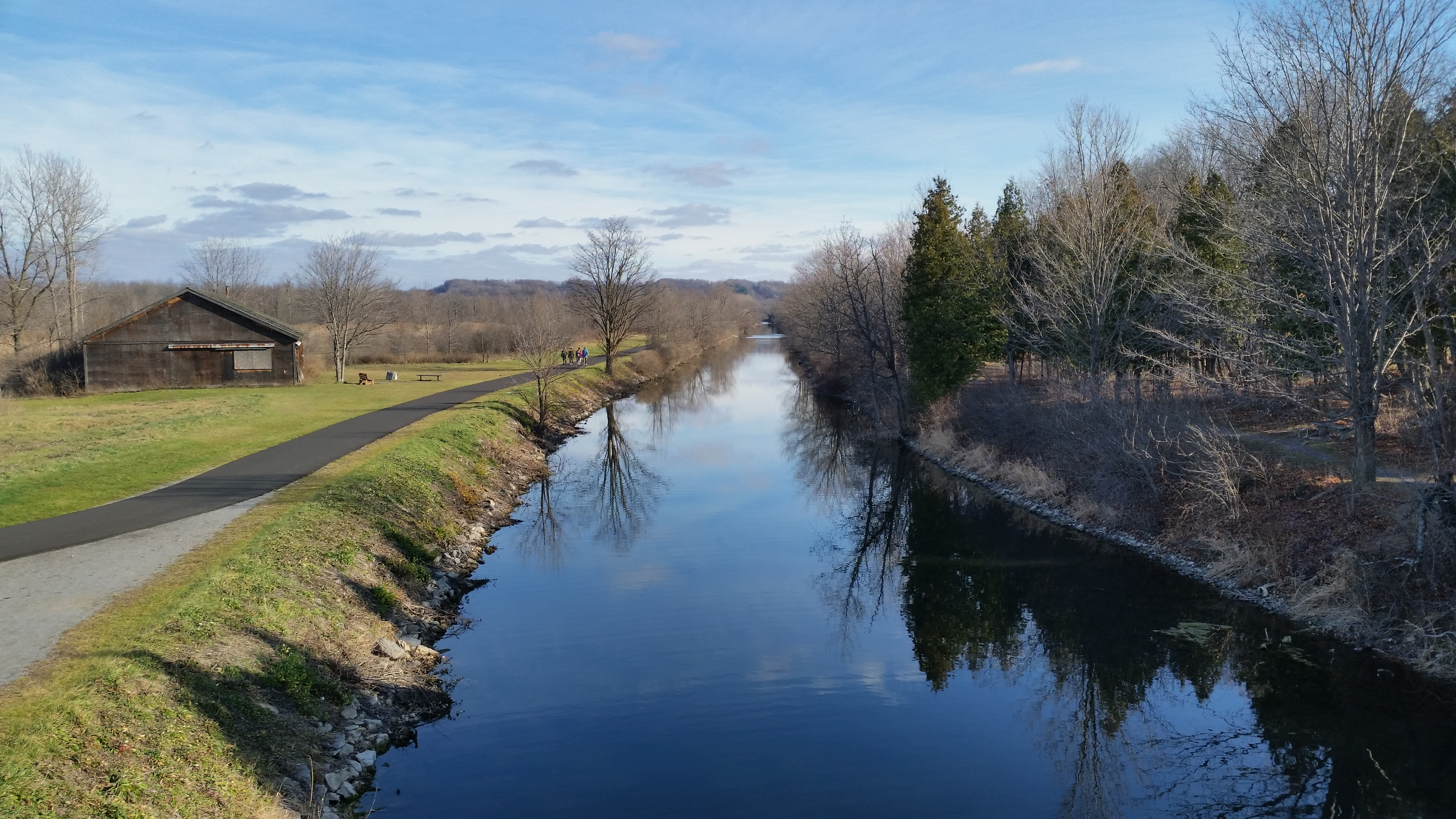
Old Erie Canal State Historic Park, at Cedar Bay Park, DeWitt, New York

Other parks, museums, and recreation areas along and nearby the Old Erie Canal State Historic Park include, from west to east:

- Ryder Park and Recreation Area, DeWitt
- Cedar Bay Park, DeWitt
- Canal Landing Park, Fayetteville
- Green Lakes State Park, Manlius
- Poolsbrook Picnic Area, Minoa
- Chittenango Landing Canal Boat Museum, Chittenango
- Canastota Canal Town Museum, Canastota
- Duruss Conservancy, Oneida
- Verona Beach State Park, Verona
- Verona Park, Verona
- Lock 21 Park, New London, Oneida County
- Erie Canal Village, Rome

== History ==
In July 2006, stretches of the old canal within the park had to be dammed or drained to effect repairs on the aqueduct over Butternut Creek east of Syracuse, which was in danger of a potentially catastrophic leak due to unusually heavy rains.

In February 2010 the park was among about 40 New York State parks recommended for closure under Governor David Paterson's austerity budget plan. The park remains open.

== See also ==
- Chittenango Landing Dry Dock Complex
- Erie Canal Museum, Syracuse
- Erie Canalway National Heritage Corridor
- New York State Canalway Trail
- Canastota Canal Town Museum
