= Green Lakes State Park =

State park in New York state, United States

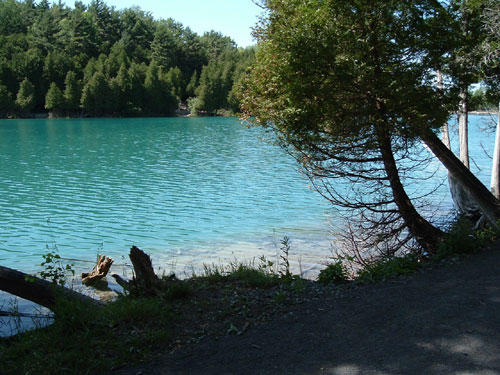
- Green Lake, seen from its eastern shore. The lake's unusual blue-green color is due to annual "whitings" that leave suspended mineral solids in its water. The mineral content of the water also makes the lake meromictic.

- Location within New York
- Type: State park
- Location: Manlius, New York
- Coordinates: 43.049°N 75.973°W
- Area: 2,200 acres (890 ha)
- Created: 1928
- Operator: New York State Office of Parks, Recreation and Historic Preservation
- Visitors: 1,687,000 (in 2022)
- Status: Open year round
- Website: Green Lakes State Park website

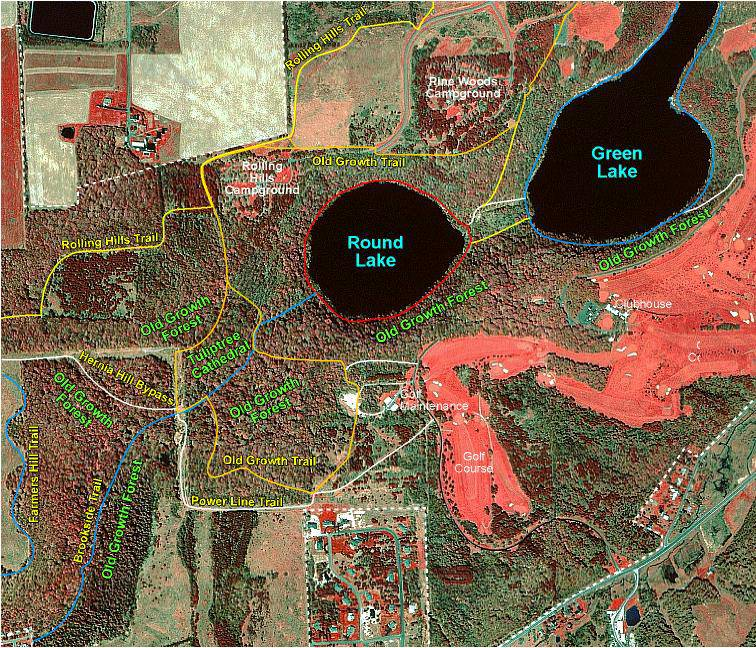
False-color satellite photograph of the central portion of Green Lakes State Park. The photograph shows the location of the two lakes, the major stands of old growth forest, and the trails that thread this section of the park.

Green Lakes State Park is a New York State Park located east of Syracuse in the town of Manlius. The park is centered on two small meromictic lakes, Green Lake and Round Lake, which have an unusual blue-green color, and preserves the largest stand of old growth forest in Central New York. The lakes lie at the base of a gorge just over a mile long, both of which are remnants of the ice ages and exemplify the unusual geology of upstate New York. Green Lake has a surface area of 65 acres and a maximum depth of 195 feet. Round Lake has a surface area of 34 acres and a maximum depth of 170 feet.

Nearly half the park's area is old-growth forest, which includes large specimens of tuliptrees, sugar maples, beech, basswood, hemlocks, and white cedars. A grove of trees, lying immediately to the southwest of Round Lake, has been called the Tuliptree Cathedral. The park also has a golf course designed by Robert Trent Jones.

== Camping and recreation ==
At its northern end, Green Lake has a sandy swimming beach, lawns for sunbathing, and a building with changing facilities and a concession stand; Green Lake is certainly one of the most popular swimming beaches in Central New York. Adjacent to the beach, there is a boathouse with rowboat and paddleboat rentals in the summer season. Currently, Green Lakes is offering stand up paddle board classes, excursions, and yoga taught by Method 360; privately owned boats and paddle boards are not permitted. The park has an 18-hole golf course designed by Robert Trent Jones, as well as a clubhouse in its southeastern quadrant. Above the western cliffs along Green Lake there are a Frisbee golf course, 137 campsites, and seven cabins for those who prefer a less rustic experience and some outdoors life experience. There are several formal picnic areas throughout the park, including some with picnic shelters that can be reserved for groups.

There is an extensive network of hiking trails throughout the park, including about 10 miles (16 km) of cross-country ski trails. Some of the trails are also available for mountain biking. The development of the lake area is mostly contained at its northern end. The western shoreline of Green Lake is undeveloped, and Round Lake itself is essentially in wilderness. Of this region, Mary Notarthomas has written that "When walking on the lake trails, one is cradled between the rich, vibrant, almost alien blue-green waters on one side and thickly vegetated, steep wooded inclines on the other." Together, North Lake Trail and Round Lake Trail make a level loop of 3.25 miles (5 km).

The park includes many bike trails, most of which are at the western edge of the park. These connect with the Old Erie Canal State Historic Park, which runs by the north entrance to Green Lakes State Park (just above the top of the aerial photograph). The Erie Canal, which was abandoned in 1918, is still continuous within this State Historic Park, and the old towpath is now a walking and bicycling path. The Park extends 36 miles (58 km) from the Butternut Creek aqueduct in DeWitt to the Erie Canal Village, which is near Rome.

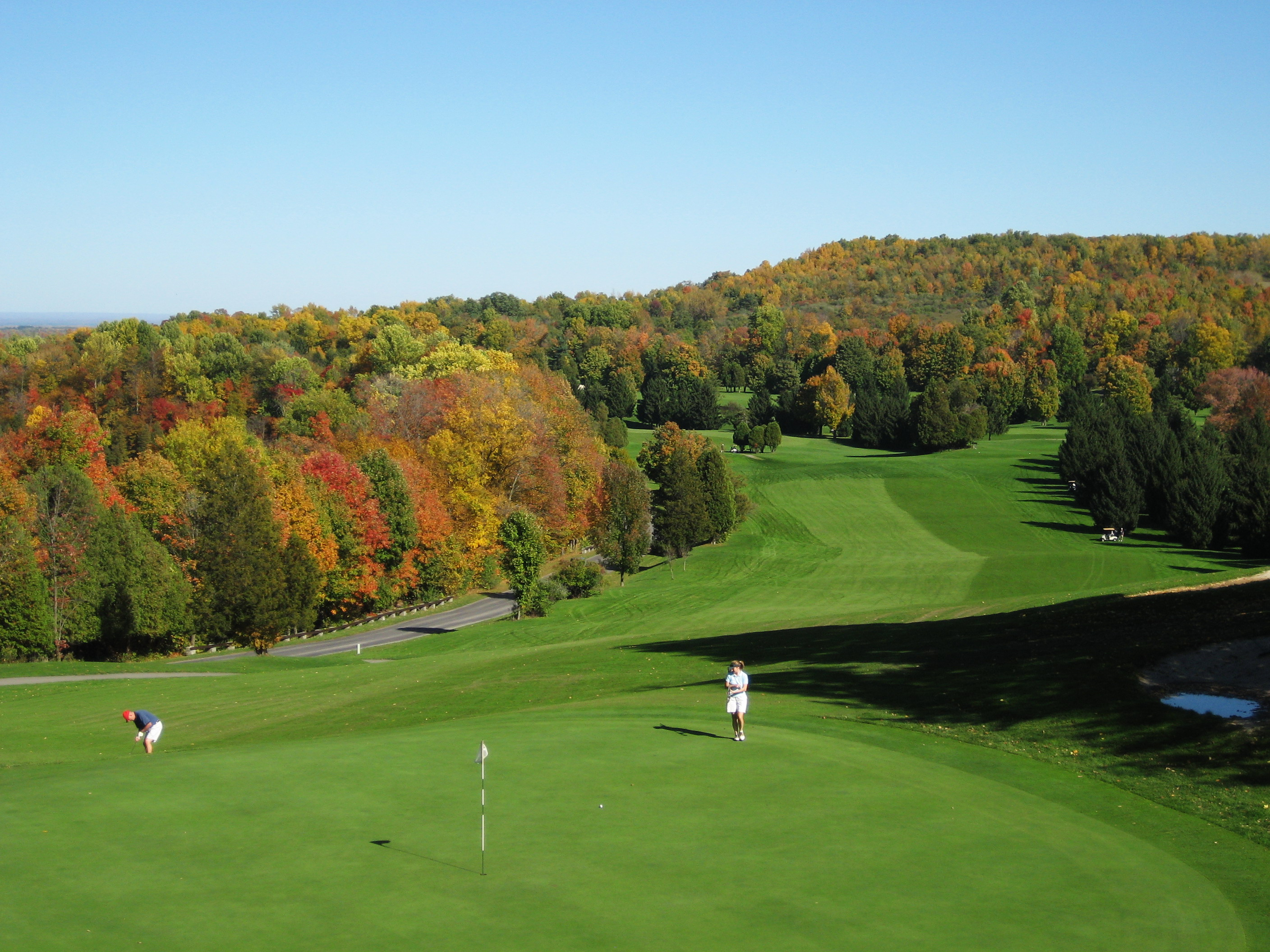
The golf course at Green Lakes State Park was designed by Robert Trent Jones in 1935.

== Golf course ==
Green Lakes State Park has an 18-hole public golf course designed by Robert Trent Jones in 1935. The course was one of Trent Jones' earliest; ultimately, he was credited with designing about 500 courses. In lieu of payment for its design, he was given a ten-year lease for $1.00/year. Jones opened the course on May 6, 1936. He'd invited Gene Sarazen to play an exhibition match with Emmett Kelly, the first course pro; more than 1,000 people came to watch.

James Dodson has written of the course that "the original little masterpiece at Green Lakes, where Wendy and I and sometimes the other Dewsweepers slipped away to chase the game among the gloriously mature evergreens and admire the long view over a dark blue glacial lake, to the very foothills of the Adirondacks themselves, remained just about my favorite Trent Jones golf course of all." Trent Jones attended the 50th anniversary of the opening of the course in 1986.

== History and planning ==
The movement to acquire the land around Green Lakes for a state park began around 1924. The history has been described in a memoir by Betsy Knapp. Knapp, a descendant of the family that acquired and farmed this area in the early 19th century, noted the particular role of Harry Francis, then a professor at the New York State College of Forestry at Syracuse University (now the State University of New York College of Environmental Science and Forestry).

In October 1927 725 acres (2.93 km^{2}) were purchased for the new park. In 1929, the Administration Building was built according to plans by Laurie D. Cox, a prominent landscape architect (and Hall of Fame lacrosse coach) who was active in the design of several New York state parks. The first superintendent of the park, Arvin Henry Almquist, lived there for four years. The building, which had been boarded up for many years, was re-opened in 2008.

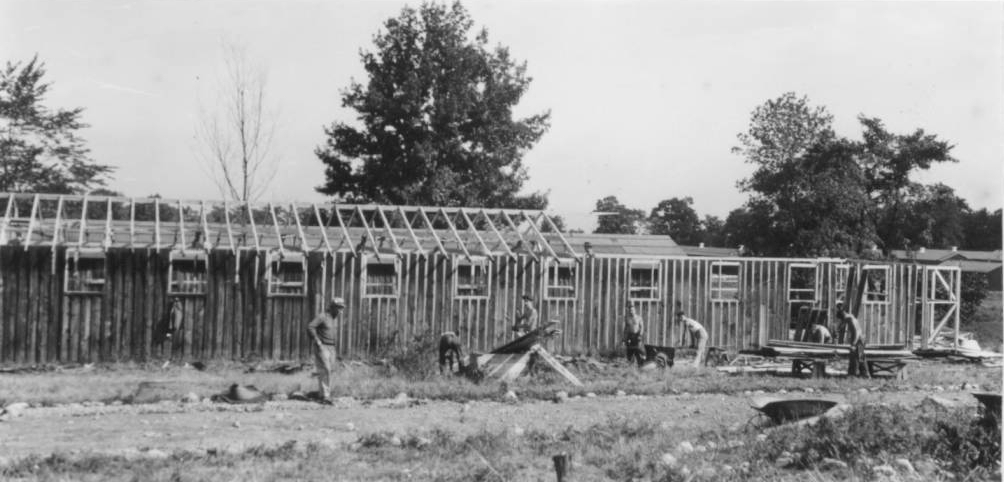
Green Lakes was a worksite for Civilian Conservation Corps project SP-12 and for companies 1203 and 2211 (veterans). The photograph records the construction of the camp barracks around 1934. After US entry into World War II in 1941, the barracks were used to house German prisoners.

During the Great Depression (1929–1939), the New York State Department of Conservation (under the administration of then-governor Franklin Delano Roosevelt) and later the Civilian Conservation Corps (CCC) constructed the park's roads, buildings, cabins, golf course and trails. CCC camps for project SP-12 were created on the property of the park. CCC company 1203, and subsequently 2211 (a company of veterans of the 1898 Spanish–American War), were assigned to the project. These men hauled loads of sand from Sylvan Beach (on nearby Oneida Lake) to create a sandy beach; they dug the basements of the park buildings by hand. The CCC also constructed barracks, dining halls, etc. for its own use. These facilities were closed in 1941. A reunion of the CCC companies who had worked in Central New York was held at Green Lakes in 1988.

The CCC camp was reopened in 1944 during World War II to house wartime farm workers from Newfoundland. In 1945 it became the Fayetteville Camp for German prisoners of war. Fayetteville Camp was a branch of Pine Camp, which was located on the site of the present Fort Drum near Watertown, New York. The camp was closed again in 1946 when the prisoners were repatriated to Germany.

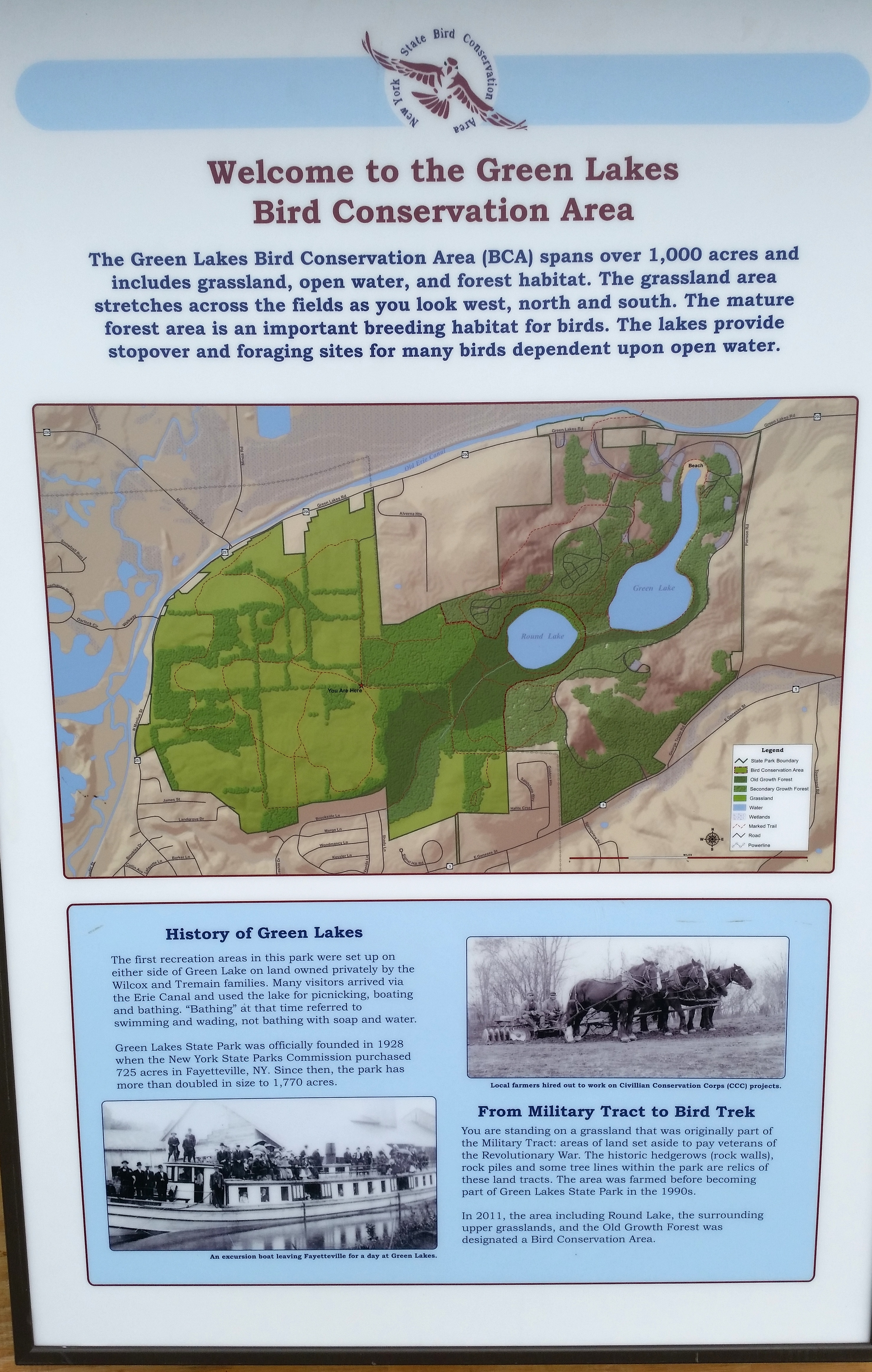
Interpretive sign at the Bird Conservation Area within Green Lakes State Park

Since the original purchase of land in 1928, the park has increased to 1,955 acres (7.91 km^{2}). There were additional acquisitions of land in 1960, 1975, 1995, and 1996. Plans to add an additional 1,000 acres (4.0 km^{2}) to the park have apparently been frustrated. 261 additional acres were acquired in 2019. Alverna Heights, a 200-acre retreat adjoining the park, was purchased from the Sisters of St. Francis by New York State on December 6, 2019. Two houses occupied by the Sisters have been leased back to them for a decade.

In 2008, the bathhouse near the park's swimming area and beach was demolished, and a new building was constructed to replace it at a cost of about $2.3 million. The building incorporates changing facilities, restrooms and showers, a snack concession, and a meeting room.

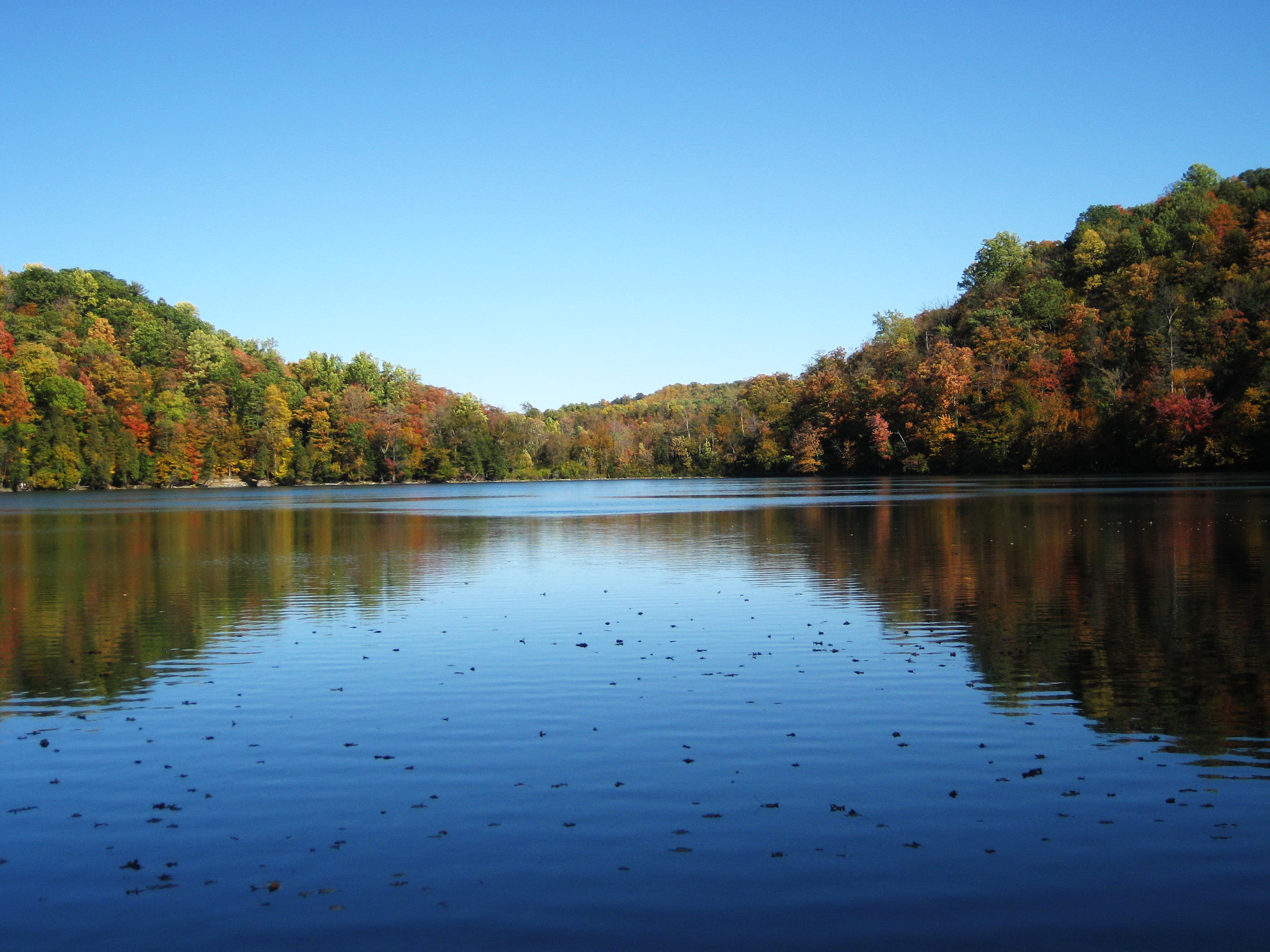
View of Round Lake looking northeast along the glacial meltwater spillway towards Green Lake.

=== 2011 Master Plan and Environmental Impact Statement ===
On March 23, 2011, the State's Office of Parks, Recreation and Historic Preservation published a "Final Master Plan/Final Environmental Impact Statement for Green Lakes State Park". The Executive Summary of the Plan notes:

- 1002 acres in the western half of the park is designated as a Bird Conservation Area.
- Approximately 105 acres in the Old Growth area within the National Natural Landmark, and the area surrounding Round Lake, is designated as a Park Preservation Area
- Improve the Rolling Hills Campground in the short term. In the long term the campground will be relocated to an area south of the park office.

While the large white-tail deer population in the park is a problem, bow hunting is excluded; some local groups have called for bow-hunting of deer in the park as a partial solution.

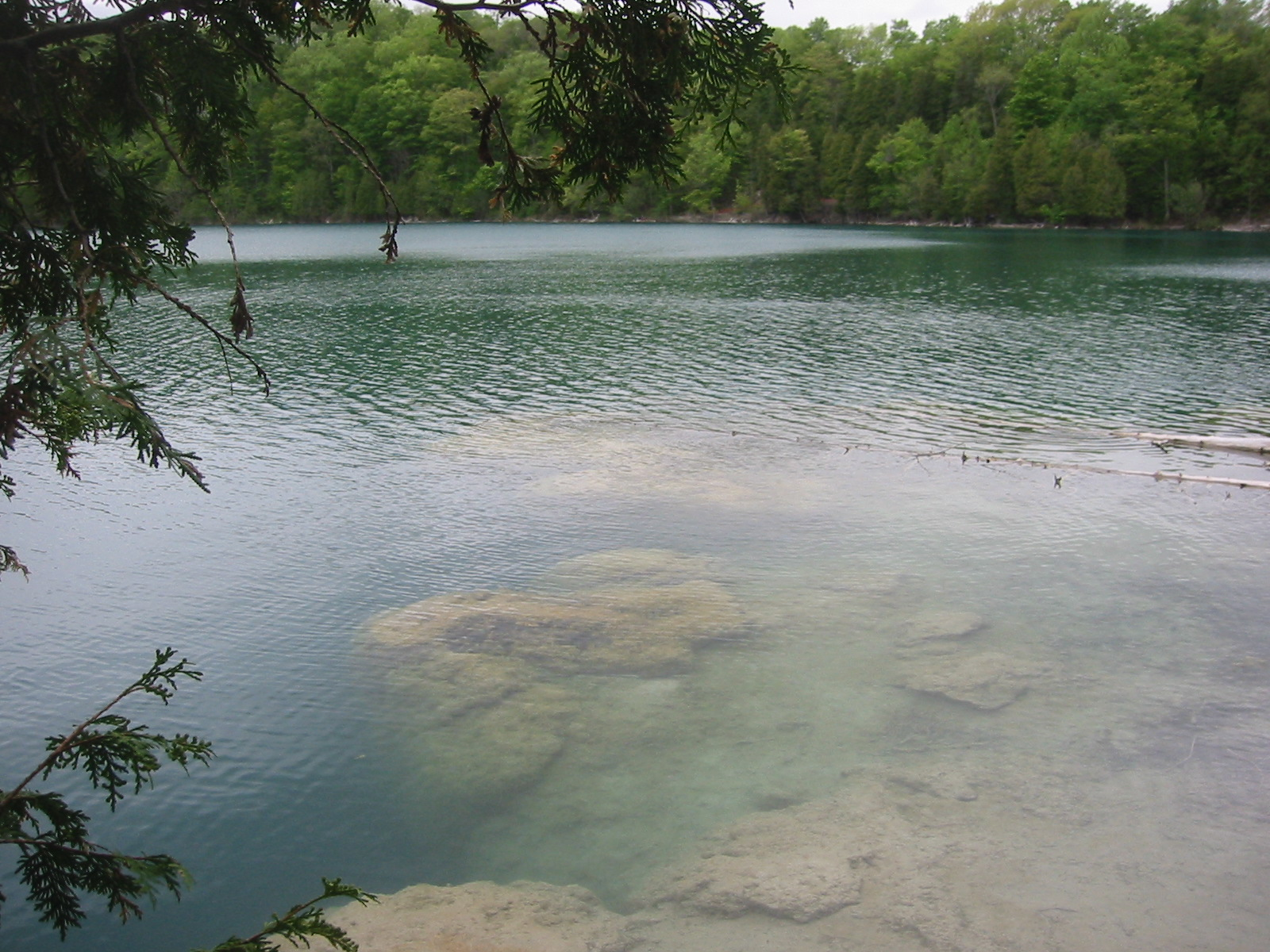
A submerged reef at Deadman's Point; the reef built up over the years from the annual "whiting" events in Green Lake, during which calcium carbonate precipitates out of the lake's waters.

== Geology and limnology ==
=== Origin of the gorge ===
The cliffs surrounding Round Lake are about 150 feet (46 m) high, but the rocky gorge in which the lake lies is much deeper than this. The bottom of Round Lake is about 180 feet (55 m) below its surface. Round Lake's bottom lies in sediments which may be another 150 feet (46 m) deep. There is thus nearly 500 feet (152 m) gouged out of the bedrock here.

This deep gorge was formed towards the end of the last ice age, about 15,000 years ago, by an enormous river of water. The river originated in the melting, retreating ice sheet, and it flowed east through this channel on its way to the sea. The Niagara River gorge lying below Niagara Falls is an active example of this type of gorge formation; its depth is about 326 feet (99 m), which is somewhat shallower than that at Green Lakes. There are several other similar gorges in the same region as Green Lakes State Park, in particular at Clark Reservation, at Smoky Hollow (1-mile (1.6 km) south of Clark Reservation), and at Pumpkin Hollow (about 10 miles (16 km) west of Clark Reservation). Geologists call these gorges and hollows "the Syracuse channels."

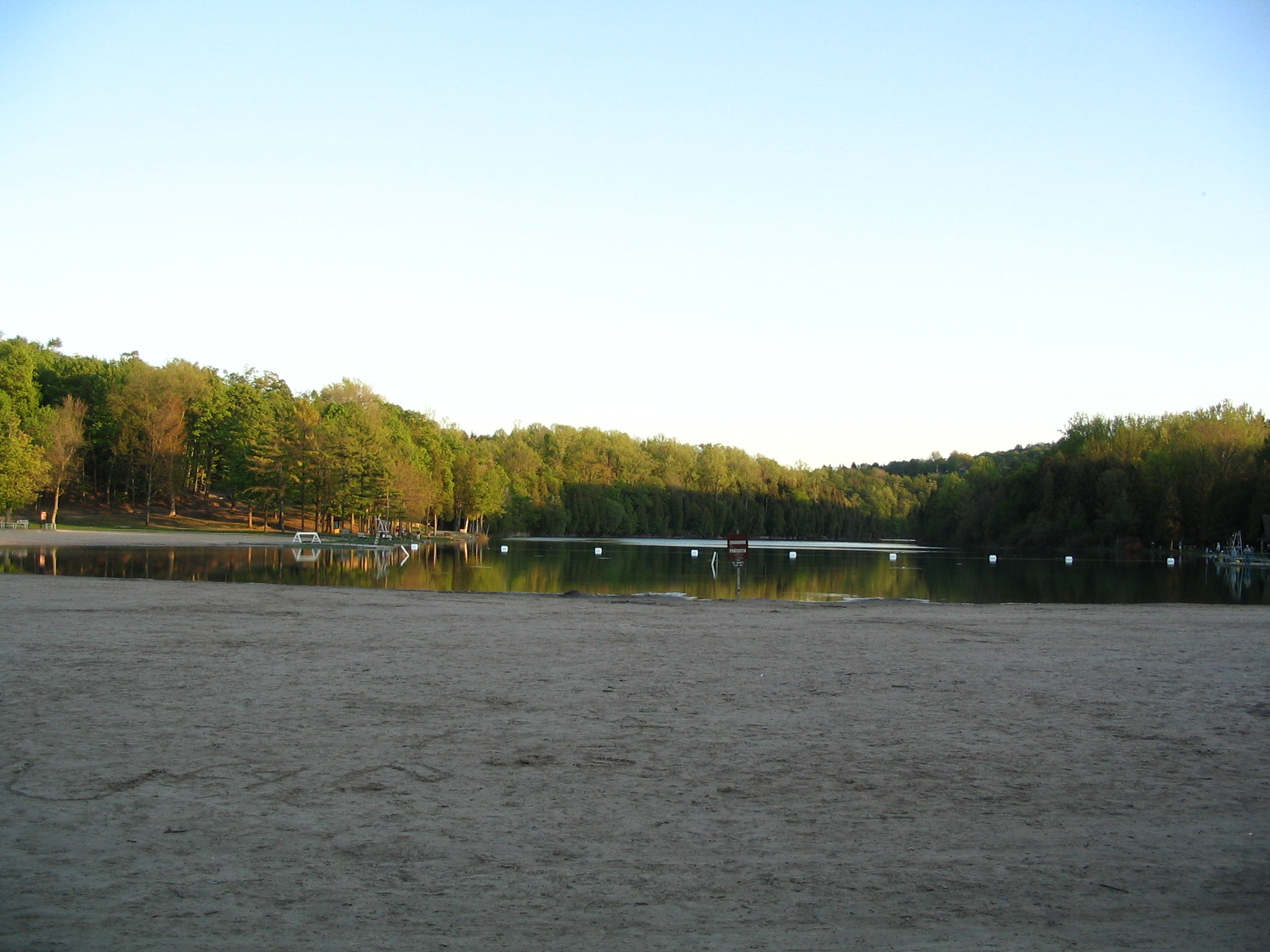
A view from Green Lakes Beach

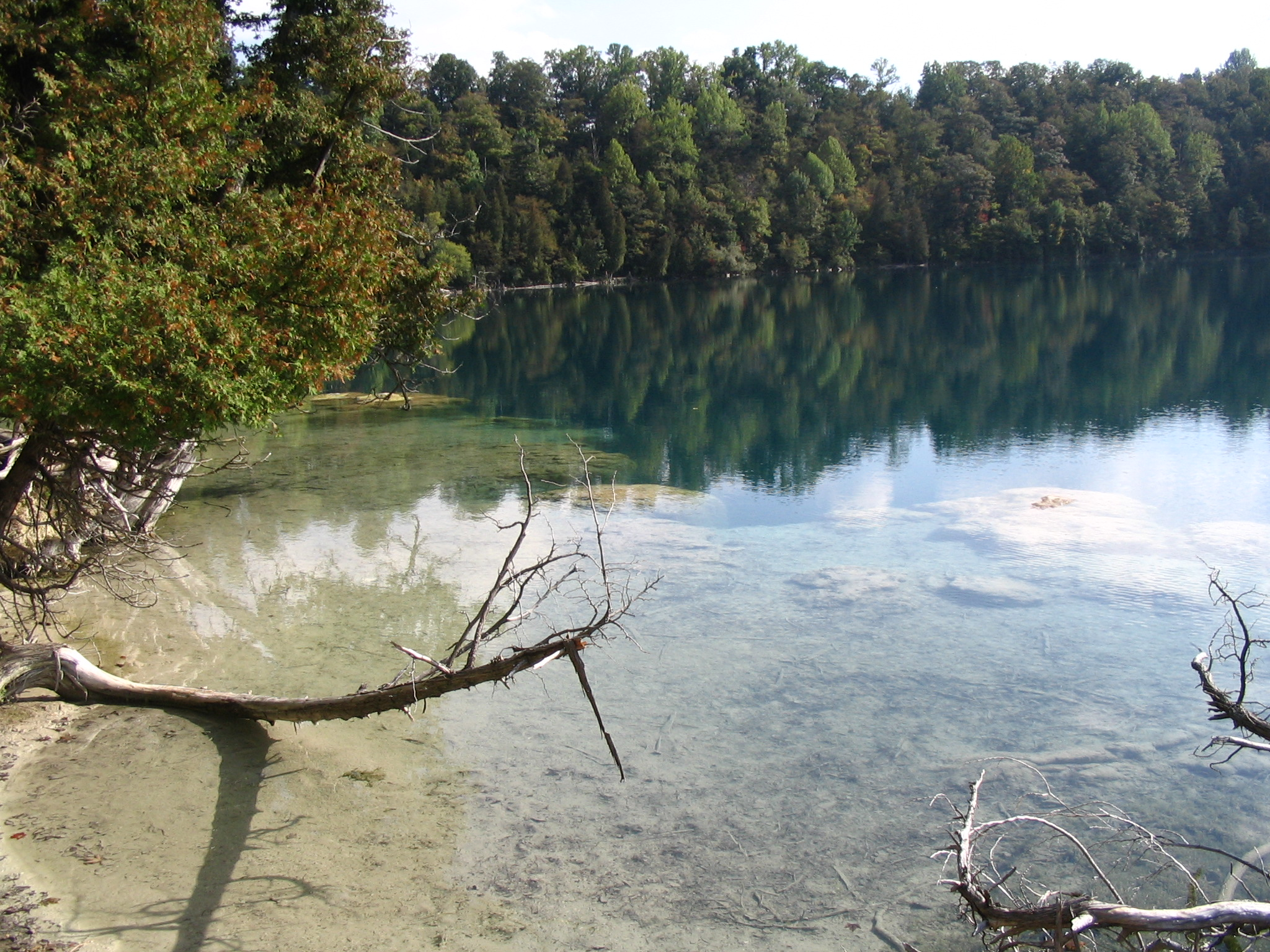
Deadman's Point at Green Lake. "Marl reef", bacteria formed chalky shoreline formations, are visible in the foreground.

=== Origin of the lakes ===
Green Lake and Round Lake are probably the remnants of the "plunge pools" of enormous waterfalls that existed during this era. However, the presence of two distinct lakes is not fully understood. As expected for plunge pools, the lakes are fairly deep in comparison to their area. For example, Round Lake is 180 feet (55 m) deep, and has a diameter of about 700 feet (213 m).

=== The color of the lakes ===
Nearly half of the water that enters the lakes comes directly through the bedrock in which the lakes are embedded. This water contains a heavy load of dissolved minerals that are not present in water that enters through the surface from rain and snow. The high concentration of sulfur in the deep waters had already been reported by 1849; the lakes' waters also have a high concentration of calcium and magnesium. This mineral concentration leads to "whiting" events each year in which small crystallites of calcite and other minerals precipitate from the water. At these times of year the lakes appear particularly green, and the small crystallites are deposited in a layer underneath the lakes' waters. The notable shoreline "reef" at Deadman's Point (see photo) on Green Lake was built up by this precipitation over thousands of years. Underneath Deadman's Point there are some extremely rare aquatic mosses and sponges.

=== Climate history and Green Lakes ===
Nearly all lakes undergo mixing of their deepest waters with their surface waters at least once a year. This mixing does not occur for Green Lake and Round Lake. They are rare, meromictic lakes. Waters deeper than about 55 feet (18 m) do not mix with the surface waters; as a consequence, they are essentially devoid of oxygen, and are rich in calcium, magnesium, and sulfur. The meromictic character of the lakes is due both to their relative depth compared to their area, and to the influx of mineral rich ground waters.

Because of this lack of physical mixing, as well as the absence of growing plants or crawling animals in their oxygen-depleted depths, the deep bottoms of the lakes have relatively undisturbed annual layers of sediment (or varves) that preserve a historical record, somewhat like tree rings do. These varves are being used to study the climate of this area of New York over the last several thousand years.

== See also ==
- Onondaga Lake
