= Charles A. Spencer =

American scientific pioneer and inventor

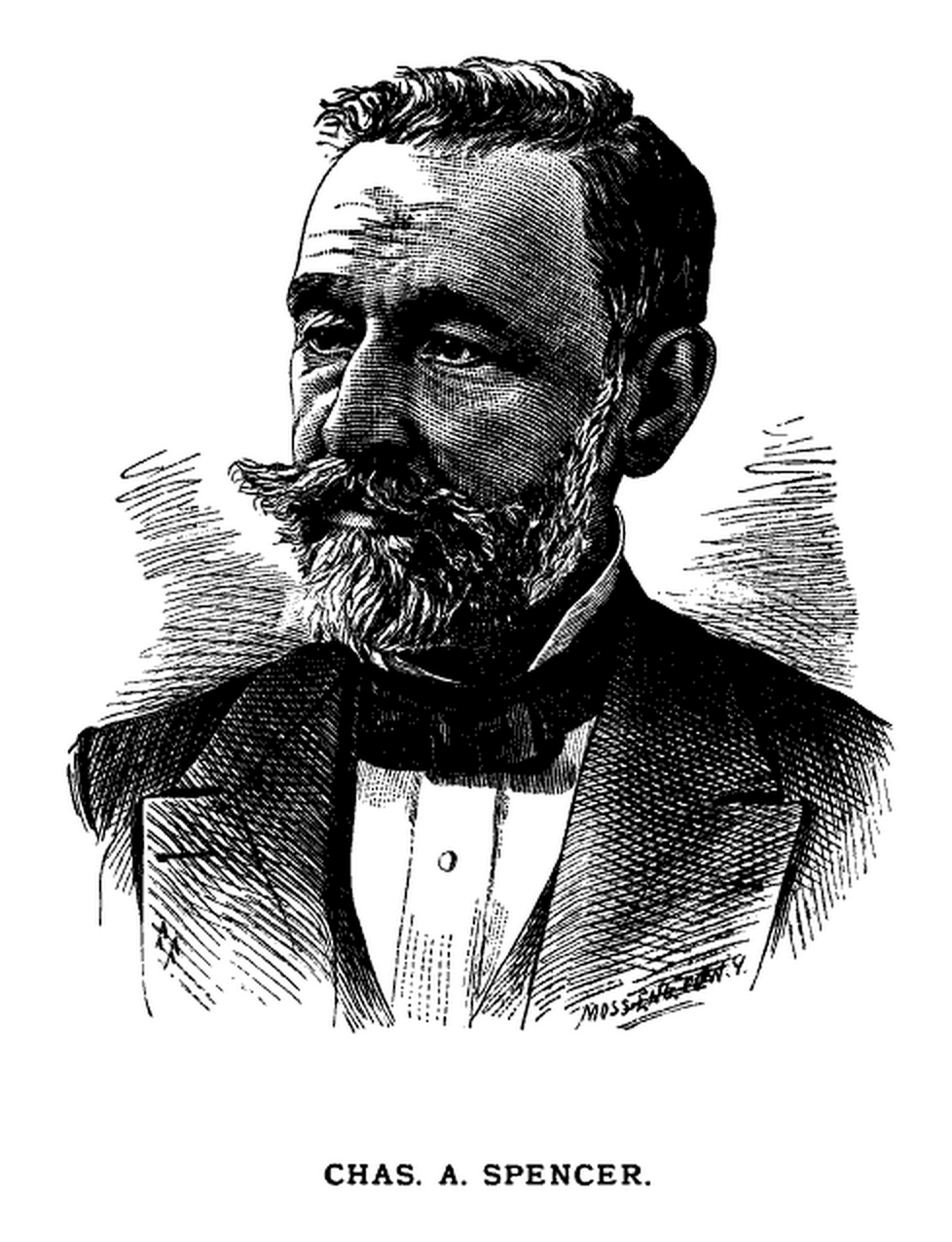
Charles A. Spencer, Courtesy of JSTOR

Charles A. Spencer was an American scientific pioneer and inventor, who is widely believed to have developed the first American-made achromatic objective microscope. He was born in 1813 in Madison County, NY and died in 1881.

== Microscopy ==
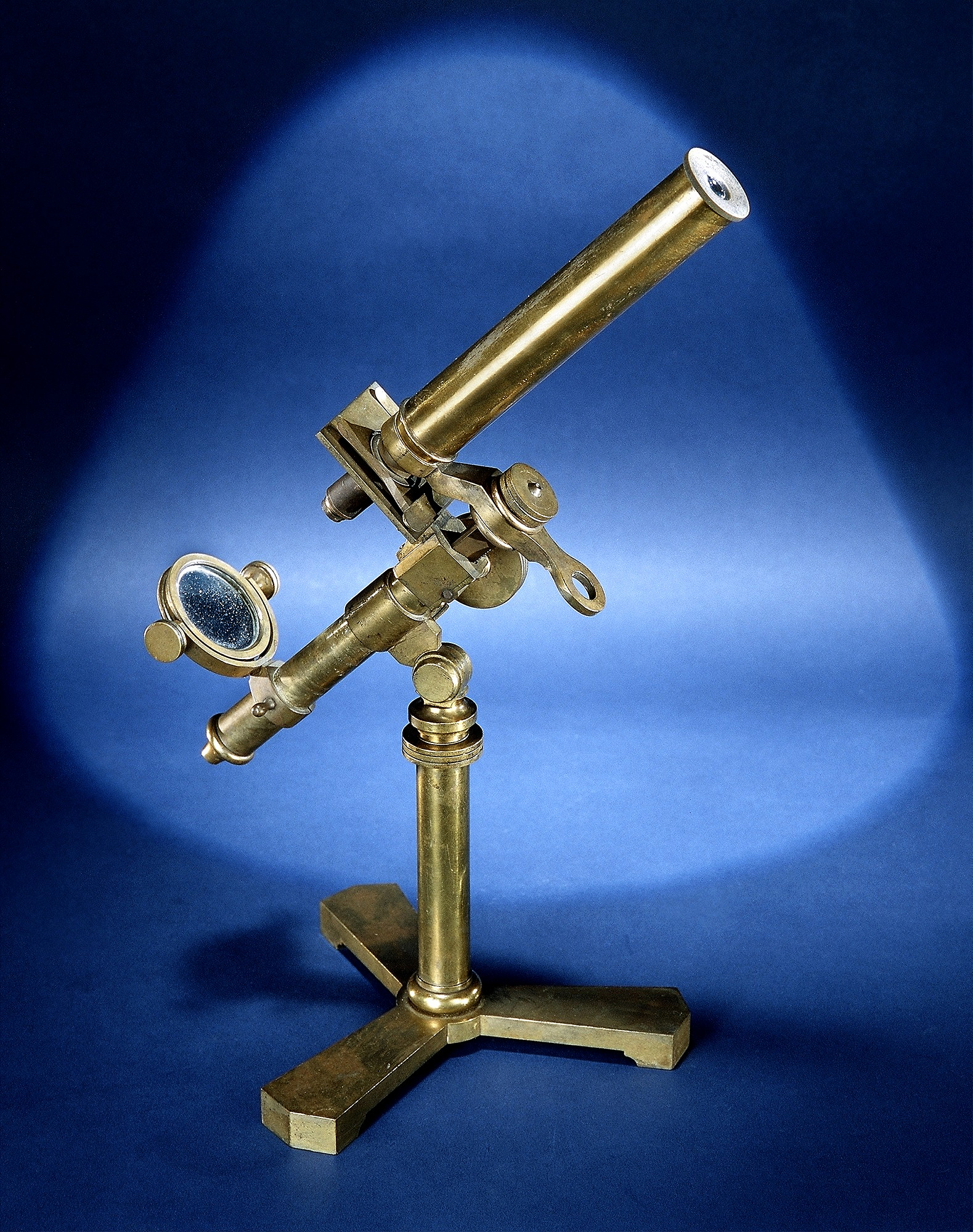
Spencer Microscope: Brass and glass, made circa 1849-1859 by C. A. & H. Spencer, Canastota, NY USA

Spencer’s first microscopes were available for purchase in 1838. Previous to Spencer’s invention, European manufacturers held a monopoly on research-quality microscopic equipment. At least one of Spencer’s microscopes survives and is currently held by the Smithsonian Institution.

== Business ==
In 1854, Spencer formed a partnership with A.K. Eaton for the manufacture of high quality microscopes, which was located in Canastota, NY, USA. This partnership would prove successful, with back-orders from all over the world reportedly exceeding $20,000 US in the currency of the day.

A “crippling” fire in 1873 however, would lead to the failure and dissolution of this original partnership. Following a move to Geneva, NY, and a brief partnership with Geneva Optical Works, a new business was founded that included Spencer's sons in 1877 called “Charles A. Spencer & Sons.”

== Honors and tributes ==
Despite not seeking recognition for their work in the trade, in 1878 the Spencer's microscopes would receive the Paris Universal Exposition Exposition Universelle (1878) highest award, the Grand Gold Medal, for excellence in their optics.

In 1884, ground was broken in Rochester, NY for the foundation of a monument to Spencer and his peer, Robert B. Tolles to provide an enduring honor of their achievements in American microscopy, and the scientific advances that grew from it.

A memorial fund was also established as an endowment, which would grant "not more than $100" each year, to be used for research purposes by the recipient.

== Legacy ==
In 1895, Herbert R. Spencer continued his father's work with the establishment of the Spencer Lens Company, based in Buffalo, NY. The company was later purchased by the American Optical Company. In 1967, Warner Lambert Pharmaceutical acquired the company which, after changing hands several times, ultimately came to be known as Reichert Technologies, Inc. In 2011, the company became a part of AMETEK.
