= Round Lake National Natural Landmark =

Round Lake
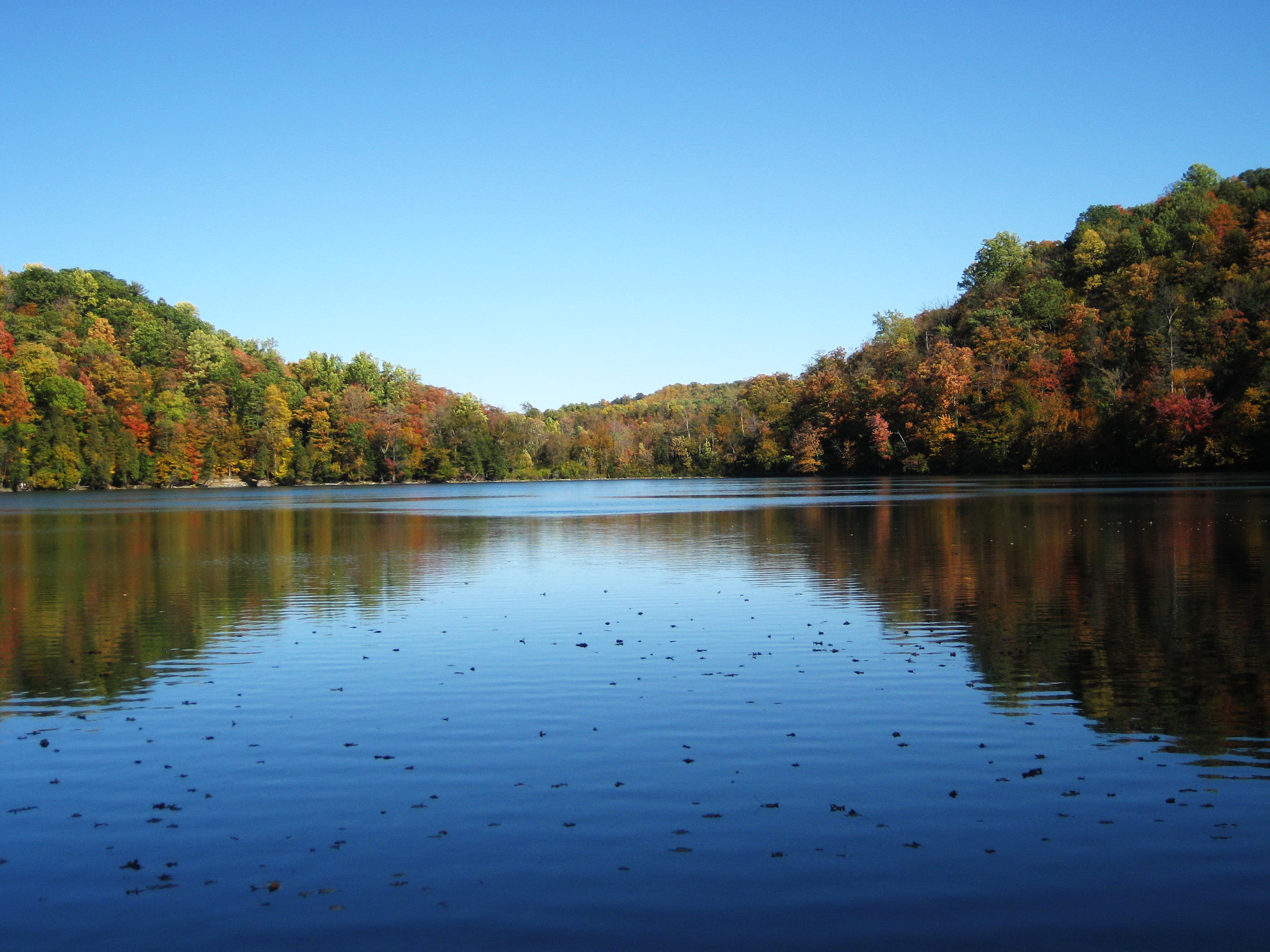
- View in October looking down the old spillway towards Green Lake.

- Location within New York Location within the United States
- Location: Green Lakes State Park, Fayetteville, New York, US
- Coordinates: 43°02′52″N 075°58′31″W
- Lake type: meromictic
- Basin countries: United States
- Max. length: 700 ft (210 m)
- Max. width: 700 ft (210 m)
- Surface area: 38 acres (15 ha)
- Max. depth: 180 ft (55 m)
- Surface elevation: 420 ft (128 m)

U.S. National Natural Landmark
- Designated: May 1973

Round Lake National Natural Landmark lies within Green Lakes State Park, which lies a few miles east of the city of Syracuse, New York and adjoining the village of Fayetteville. Round Lake itself and the adjoining 59 acres (24 ha) of old-growth forest were designated a National Natural Landmark in 1973 by the U.S. Department of the Interior. Hubert W. Vogelmann, a professor of botany at the University of Vermont, wrote the evaluation to the National Park Service that concurred with the recommendation of National Natural Landmark status for the region around Round Lake. Vogelmann's evaluation noted the "outstanding virgin mesophytic forest" adjoining Round Lake on its southwestern side; this text became part of the citation when the landmark was created. Vogelmann also noted Round Lake's importance as an extremely rare, "meromictic" lake. It shares this distinction with Green Lake, which lies a few hundred meters to the east.

== Preservation of the old-growth forest ==
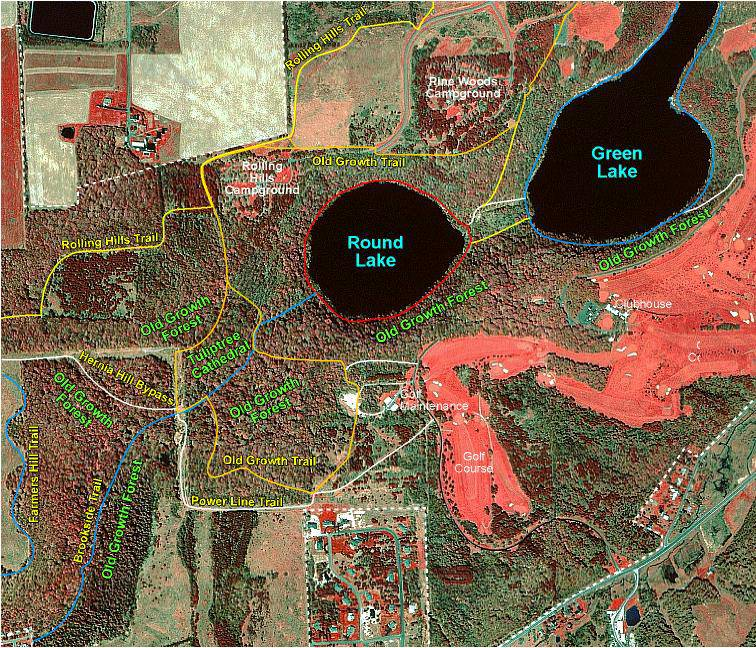
False-color satellite photograph of the central portion of Green Lakes State Park. The photograph shows the location of the two lakes, the major stands of old growth forest, and the trails that thread this section of the park. ©2003 TERRA: The Earth Renewal and Restoration Alliance.

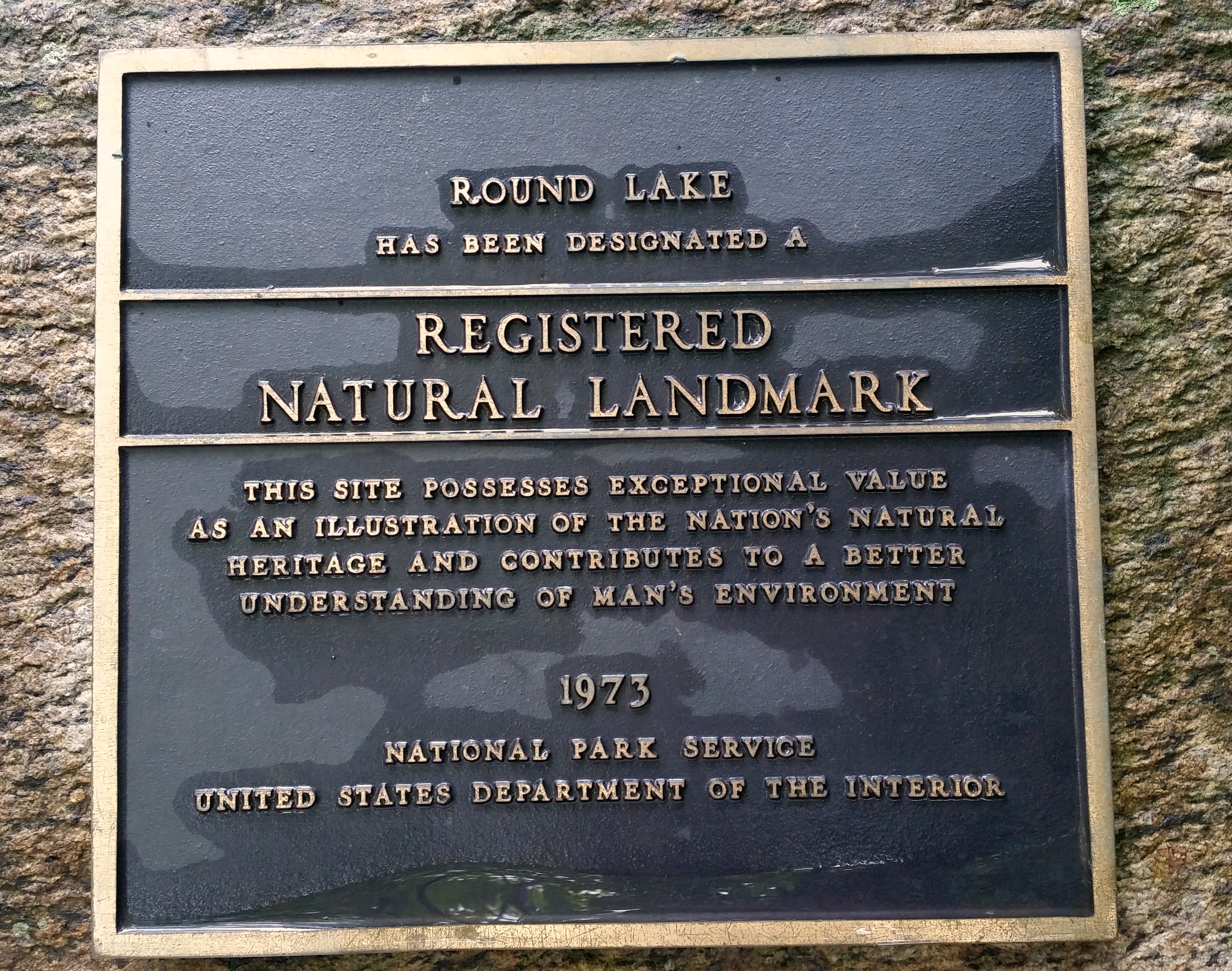
Plaque recording the status of Round Lake as a National Natural Landmark

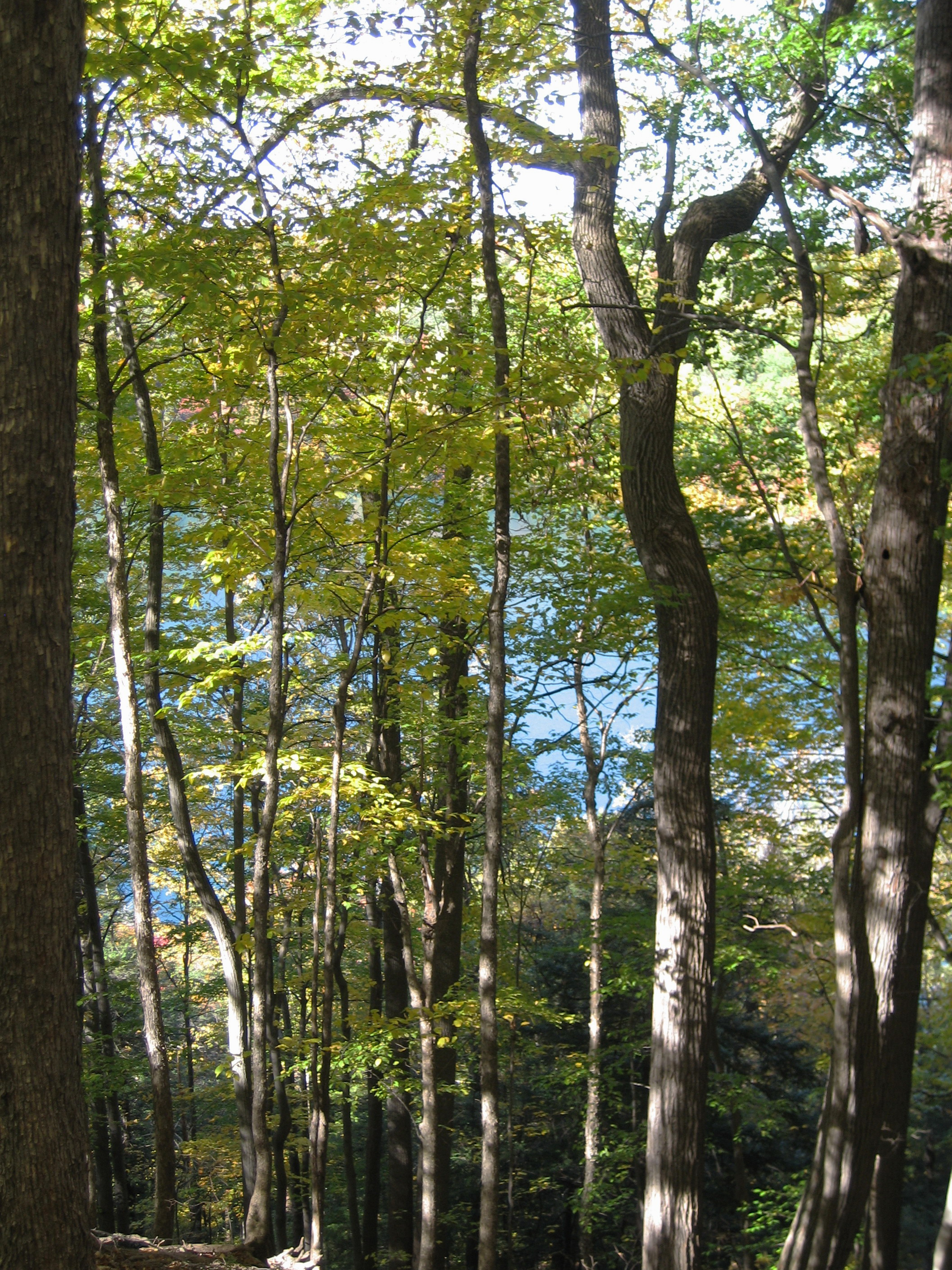
October view through the old growth forest from the escarpment above Round Lake.

The virgin quality of the forest near Round Lake was already considered unusual in 1855, when Ledyard Lincklaen noted that this "dense body of woodland had hardly felt the axe." The region of Upstate New York in which Round Lake lies was heavily forested through the 18th Century, but by 1855 the region had largely been deforested to create farmland. In the early 19th Century, Upstate New York was rapidly being settled by European-Americans. Soldiers who had fought in the Revolutionary War had often received land grants in this former Haudenosaunee territory. Essentially the first act of most settlers was to cut down the primeval forest and to burn the hardwood logs to make potash, which was quite profitable in that era.

The land near Round Lake was settled in 1817 by David Collin III. It lies within one mile (1.6 km) of the Erie Canal, which was completed in 1825. It is remarkable that a forest so close to a major transportation route remained nearly untouched throughout the 19th Century. However, for the entire interval between 1817 and the purchase of the land for Green Lakes State Park, most of it was owned by Collin or by his descendants. One of these descendants, Betsy Knapp, wrote a memoir Rocks, Fields and Beauty Forever: One Family's Memories of Fayetteville's Green Lakes in 1989. Her memoir makes clear that the land was never clearcut either for lumber or for potash. In essence, the forest was preserved by the Collin family until its purchase for the park in 1928.

The old-growth forestlands throughout Green Lakes State Park were extensively surveyed in 2001-2002 by members of the Wildwood Ancient Forest Alliance. The surveys found that there are about 800 acres (3 km^{2}) of old-growth forest within the park. The surveyors speculated that the paucity of hemlock trees in some areas indicates selective cutting of this species, perhaps for log roads in the mid 19th Century. They nonetheless conclude that "Green Lakes State Park is likely the finest old growth forest in central New York." Green Lakes State Park contains particularly old and large examples of tuliptrees, sugar maples, beech, basswood, hemlocks, and white cedars. One particularly impressive grove of trees, lying just southwest of Round Lake, was renamed the Tuliptree Cathedral following the 2001-2002 old-growth surveys. A survey of the heights of especially large trees was reported in 2011; the tallest was 147 feet (45 m).

== Limnology of Round Lake and Green Lake ==
The lake is 180 feet (55 m) deep, which is remarkable given its diameter of 700 feet (213 m). Both Round Lake and Green Lake are meromictic, which means that the bottom waters of the lake are not mixed annually with the surface waters. For both lakes, the waters deeper than 55 feet (17 m) are unmixed and essentially devoid of oxygen. Meromictic lakes are quite rare; nearly all lakes undergo mixing of their deep and shallow waters at least once each year. Green Lake in particular has been the subject of a great deal of limnological research. The lakes are meromictic both because of their depth (relative to their diameters) and because there is an influx of mineral-laden groundwater into them; to some extent the lakes are giant mineral springs. The mineral content also accounts for the lakes' greenish appearance at certain times of year, when small particles of calcium carbonate and other minerals precipitate out of the water; these "whitings" cause the white coating of the lake bottoms that is readily observable at the shoreline.

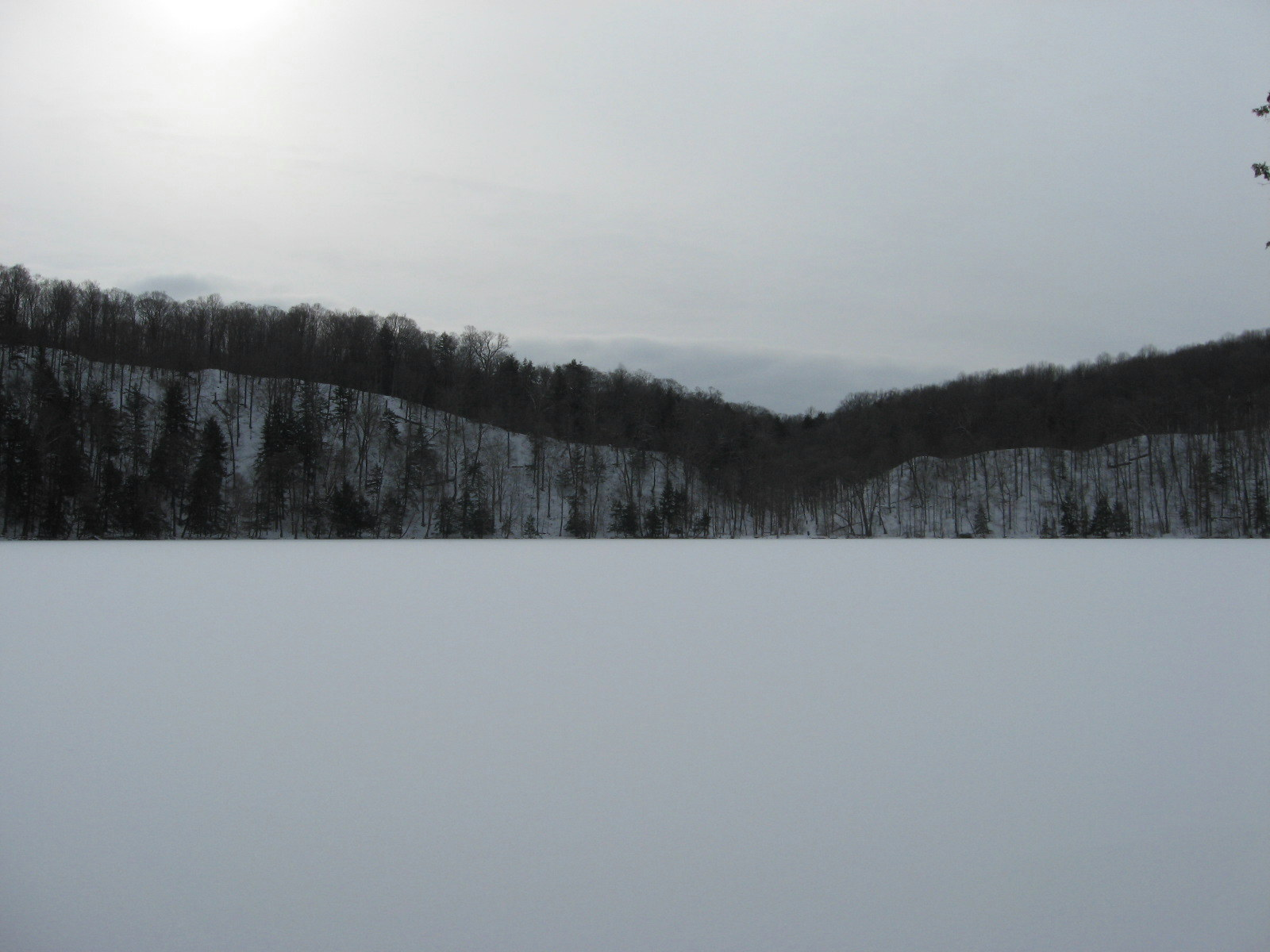
Round Lake winter scene

In addition to the strictly limnological research on the lakes, the sediments at their bottoms are being used to explore the history of the plant and animal life and of the climate around the lake over the last several thousand years (i.e. its paleoclimatology). Because the deep, oxygen-depleted bottoms of the lakes are undisturbed either by annual mixing or by "bioturbation" (plant growth or movement of worms and other animals), each year's sediments are preserved as distinguishable layers (or varves) that can be dated back in time from the present. There is a distinct change in the color of the varves that occurred around 1800; the lower, older varves are dark brown, and the higher, younger varves are grey. The varves thus record the change in the lakes' environment around 1800, when the primeval forests in the region were replaced by open fields and farmland. The Round Lake National Natural Landmark offers a glimpse of the original forest.

== See also ==
- List of National Natural Landmarks in New York
