= Canastota, New York =

Canastota, New York Kniste Stota (Oneida)
- Village
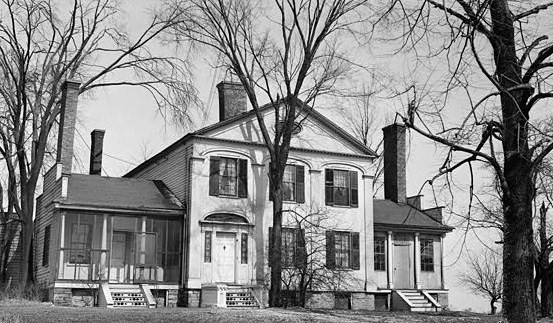
- Judge Nathan Roberts House on NYS Route 5

- Location within New York Location within the United States
- Coordinates: 43°4′51″N 75°45′13″W
- Country: United States
- State: New York
- County: Madison
- Town: Lenox

Government
  - Mayor: Roseanne Warner (R)

Area
  - Total: 3.34 sq mi (8.66 km^{2})
  - Land: 3.34 sq mi (8.65 km^{2})
  - Water: 0.0039 sq mi (0.01 km^{2})
- Elevation: 430 ft (131 m)

Population (2020)
  - Total: 4,556
  - Density: 1,364.2/sq mi (526.73/km^{2})
- Time zone: UTC-5 (Eastern (EST))
  - Summer (DST): UTC-4 (EDT)
- ZIP Code: 13032
- Area code: 315
- FIPS code: 36-12188
- GNIS feature ID: 0945755
- Website: canastota.gov

Canastota is a village within the town of Lenox in Madison County, New York, United States. The population was 4,556 at the 2020 census, down from 4,804 in 2010.

The village was incorporated in 1835, but was reorganized in 1870. Located along the banks of the Erie Canal, which was completed through the Mohawk River valley by 1825, Canastota was a vibrant trading and commercial town during the mid-nineteenth century for a wide agricultural area and an important stop between the cities of Rome and Syracuse.

Although the section of the canal running through the village was abandoned by the 1920s, much of the section remains intact and is now part of the Old Erie Canal State Historic Park.

The village of Canastota is in the southern part of the town of Lenox and is the home to the International Boxing Hall of Fame.

== History ==
Perspective map and list of landmarks for Canastota from 1885 by L.R. Burleigh

=== Native peoples ===
Kniste Stota was the historic name of Canastota, a term used by the local Oneida people, meaning "cluster of pines near still waters".

The area that makes up Canastota was once inhabited by people of the Oneida Nation, a member of the Haudenosanee confederacy. The Nation's homelands before European settlement of central New York consisted of more than six million acres from the St. Lawrence River to the Susquehanna River.

=== Captain Reuben Perkins ===
The village was founded by Captain Reuben Perkins, a veteran of the Revolutionary War who served in the battles of Plattsburgh, Saratoga, and Stony Point. In 1800 Captain Perkins moved his family to a log cabin on Quality Hill, along the Seneca Turnpike. In 1810, Captain Perkins purchased 329.2 acres (133.2 ha) of land from the Oneida Nation and permanently settled his family in a cabin at the intersection of what would become James Street and Main Street. Perkins later won a contract for the two miles of the Erie Canal through Canastota, and served as its superintendent. In 1814 Perkins sold 100 acres (40 ha) of his land, and in 1832 he sold his remaining land holdings.

=== The Erie Canal ===
Construction of the Erie Canal through Canastota began in 1817. As the waterway was opened from 1819 through 1825, it caused a surge of growth and development in the area. Workers and their employers soon moved their families to the area, and eventually schools, businesses, and religious organizations sprung up.

As soon as this section of the canal was opened, a line of packets was established, making regular trips between Syracuse and Utica, stopping at all intermediate towns. Trade sprang up at once between Canastota and other villages, making it one of the foremost villages in central New York. The first post office was established in 1829 with Ichabod S. Spencer as postmaster, and by 1831 there were three public houses, three stores and a hatter business in the village, and the population totaled 406.

When the canal was superseded by the construction of railroads, and later the New York State Thruway, some canal towns were cut off from the main lines of commerce.

=== Liberty Party National Convention ===
On the first and second days of September 1852, the national convention of the Liberty Party was held at the Dutch Reformed Church in Canastota. Much of the convention's business was to hear reports from delegates regarding the attitude towards the abolition of slavery in their respective areas. Among the speakers and attendees were Frederick Douglass, Gerrit Smith, and Jermain Wesley Loguen. Later debate during the convention focused on whether the party should nominate its own presidential candidate or if they should support the nomination of the Free Democracy Party.

The 170th anniversary of the convention was celebrated in 2022, attended by representatives from the village of Canastota, the town of Lenox, and the William G. Pomeroy foundation. A marker was placed as a dedication to the convention on the site where it was held.

=== The Terrible Fire of 1873 ===
On Sunday, October 26, 1873, a fire started in a hay barn located to the east of the village. Some sixty tons of hay and the barn it was stored in burned completely.

Just after 1:30am the following morning, another fire was discovered in a small barn on Spencer Street which soon spread to the Eagle Hotel and other surrounding dwellings and businesses. Urged forward by fierce winds, the fire soon raged through several blocks, leaving smoldering ruins in its wake. In total, over thirty buildings were completely destroyed.

No deaths were reported in the next day's edition of the Canastota Herald, though many were reported to have sustained serious burns to their faces and hands as they worked tirelessly to retrieve personal items and other goods from the burning buildings. Many of the early records of the village were lost in this fire.

The Herald later reported that in a letter to the Relief Committee, Gerrit Smith wrote, "Let not Canastota despair. She has still more left than she has lost. She has the sympathies and prayers of her fellowman left; above all, the loving God is left to her." Mr. Smith enclosed his letter with a check for $1,000.

=== 1908 New York to Paris Race ===
The 1908 Race from New York to Paris travelled directly through Canastota.

=== 2024 tornado ===
On July 16, 2024, the town suffered considerable damage from an EF1 tornado. One person was killed by the tornado.

== Geography ==
Canastota is in the southern part of the town of Lenox. Interstate 90, the New York State Thruway, passes through the northern part of the village, with access from Exit 34. I-90 leads east 28 miles (45 km) to Utica and west 20 miles (32 km) to the Syracuse area. New York State Route 13 passes through the center of Canastota as Peterboro Street and leads north 9 miles (14 km) to Sylvan Beach at the east end of Oneida Lake. State Route 5 runs along the southern border of Canastota, leading east 5 miles (8 km) to Oneida and west 6 miles (10 km) to Chittenango.

According to the U.S. Census Bureau, the village of Canastota has a total area of 3.3 square miles (8.5 km^{2}), of which 0.004 square miles (0.010 km^{2}), or 0.12%, are water. Canastota Creek flows through the center of the village and joins Cowaselon Creek in the village's north end, which continues northwest to Oneida Lake at Lakeport.

== Demographics ==
Historical population
Census	Pop.	Note	%±
1840	800		—
1850	900		12.5%
1860	1,081		20.1%
1870	1,492		38.0%
1880	1,569		5.2%
1890	2,774		76.8%
1900	3,030		9.2%
1910	3,247		7.2%
1920	3,995		23.0%
1930	4,235		6.0%
1940	4,150		−2.0%
1950	4,458		7.4%
1960	4,896		9.8%
1970	5,033		2.8%
1980	4,773		−5.2%
1990	4,673		−2.1%
2000	4,425		−5.3%
2010	4,804		8.6%
2020	4,556		−5.2%
U.S. Decennial Census

=== 2020 census ===
As of the 2020 census, Canastota had a population of 4,556. The median age was 38.9 years. 23.2% of residents were under the age of 18 and 17.9% of residents were 65 years of age or older. For every 100 females there were 91.6 males, and for every 100 females age 18 and over there were 87.8 males age 18 and over.

98.8% of residents lived in urban areas, while 1.2% lived in rural areas.

There were 1,943 households in Canastota, of which 28.8% had children under the age of 18 living in them. Of all households, 36.6% were married-couple households, 17.9% were households with a male householder and no spouse or partner present, and 32.7% were households with a female householder and no spouse or partner present. About 33.9% of all households were made up of individuals and 16.4% had someone living alone who was 65 years of age or older.

There were 2,109 housing units, of which 7.9% were vacant. The homeowner vacancy rate was 1.5% and the rental vacancy rate was 8.3%.

Racial composition as of the 2020 census
Race	Number	Percent
White	4,126	90.6%
Black or African American	74	1.6%
American Indian and Alaska Native	40	0.9%
Asian	29	0.6%
Native Hawaiian and Other Pacific Islander	1	0.0%
Some other race	15	0.3%
Two or more races	271	5.9%
Hispanic or Latino (of any race)	102	2.2%

=== 2000 census ===
As of the census of 2000, there were 4,425 people, 1,872 households, and 1,173 families residing in the village. The population density was 1,332.3 inhabitants per square mile (514.4/km^{2}). There were 1,994 housing units at an average density of 600.3 per square mile (231.8/km^{2}). The racial makeup of the village was 97.31% White, 0.93% African American, 0.38% Native American, 0.29% Asian, 0.38% from other races, and 0.70% from two or more races. Hispanic or Latino of any race were 1.13% of the population.

There were 1,872 households, out of which 29.6% had children under the age of 18 living with them, 45.9% were married couples living together, 11.9% had a female householder with no husband present, and 37.3% were non-families. 32.2% of all households were made up of individuals, and 17.6% had someone living alone who was 65 years of age or older. The average household size was 2.36 and the average family size was 2.96.

In the village, the population was spread out, with 25.3% under the age of 18, 7.2% from 18 to 24, 28.7% from 25 to 44, 20.9% from 45 to 64, and 17.9% who were 65 years of age or older. The median age was 37 years. For every 100 females, there were 88.1 males. For every 100 females age 18 and over, there were 86.7 males.

The median income for a household in the village was $34,155, and the median income for a family was $43,049. Males had a median income of $31,296 versus $24,047 for females. The per capita income for the village was $16,324. About 10.0% of families and 14.8% of the population were below the poverty line, including 19.5% of those under age 18 and 19.8% of those age 65 or over.

== Economy ==
The presence of fertile soils made Canastota an agricultural center in Central New York and a source of vegetables for the region. In the late 19th and early 20th centuries, many Italian families immigrated here to become tenant farmers and landowners. The village was sometimes referred to as the onion capital of the world, and onions once accounted for a large portion of the village income.

During the 1850s, Charles Spencer constructed compound microscopes and achromatic objective microscopes. Robert Tolles became his partner. The manufacturing operation moved elsewhere following the fire of 1873.

In 1893, David S. Watson moved his wagon building company, Watson Wagons, to a former broomstick factory building in Canastota, alongside the railroad and the Erie Canal. In 1899, Watson Wagons had 300 employees in Canastota and sold over 100 wagons, costing $104 for the base model. Watson Wagons were unique in that they had a mechanism to allow the operator to drop the wagon's contents through the bottom of the wagon bed. The wagons were used in agriculture, waste management, and road development. Eventually, they also saw use in World War I, when France and the United States purchased 15,000 wagons to carry engineering equipment and artillery. Watson sold his shares of the company in 1908, but the factory continued to sell wagons until 1933. The factory went through many changes after the great depression, and eventually turned to manufacturing Rex school buses. The factory, for some time, was operated by Oneida Limited, and then by Henney Motor Company, where some of the United States' first electric automobiles were made.

Herman Casler of Canastota invented the Biograph, an early motion picture machine. The first showing of movies using of the biograph occurred at the Bruce Opera House in Canastota. In 1904, Harry D. Weed invented the Tire chain, and patented his invention while working for the Marvin and Casler Machine Shop in Canastota.

== Arts and culture ==
There are 16 sites in Canastota listed on the National Register of Historic Places. This includes the Canastota Canal Town Museum.

Canastota has produced two world boxing champions: Carmen Basilio and Billy Backus--and is the location of the International Boxing Hall of Fame.

== Notable people ==
- Billy Backus, former World Welterweight Champion
- Carmen Basilio, former World Welterweight and Middleweight Champion
- Milton De Lano, former US congressman
- Edmund Giambastiani, US Navy admiral
- Margaret Shulock, cartoonist

== See also ==
- Canistota, South Dakota
- Chad Hanna
