= Long Level =

The name Long Level refers to two separate areas in the eastern United States.

== New York ==
Long Level, New York was a section of the Erie Canal, extending from Frankfort, New York (43°2′56″N 75°4′19″W) 70 miles (110 km) westward to Syracuse, New York. The flat topography of this area meant that this section of the canal required no lockage. Initial construction on the Erie Canal was begun on this section at Rome, New York on July 4, 1817. A 36-mile portion of the Long Level has been incorporated into New York's Old Erie Canal State Historic Park.

== Pennsylvania ==
Long Level, Pennsylvania was similarly named for a long and level stretch of the Susquehanna and Tidewater Canal, which ran from Wrightsville, Pennsylvania to Havre de Grace, Maryland. Long Level is in Lower Windsor Township, Pennsylvania about four miles south of Wrightsville, Pennsylvania on the Susquehanna River. (39°59′16″N 76°29′51″W)
