= Canal Town Museum =

- U.S. National Register of Historic Places
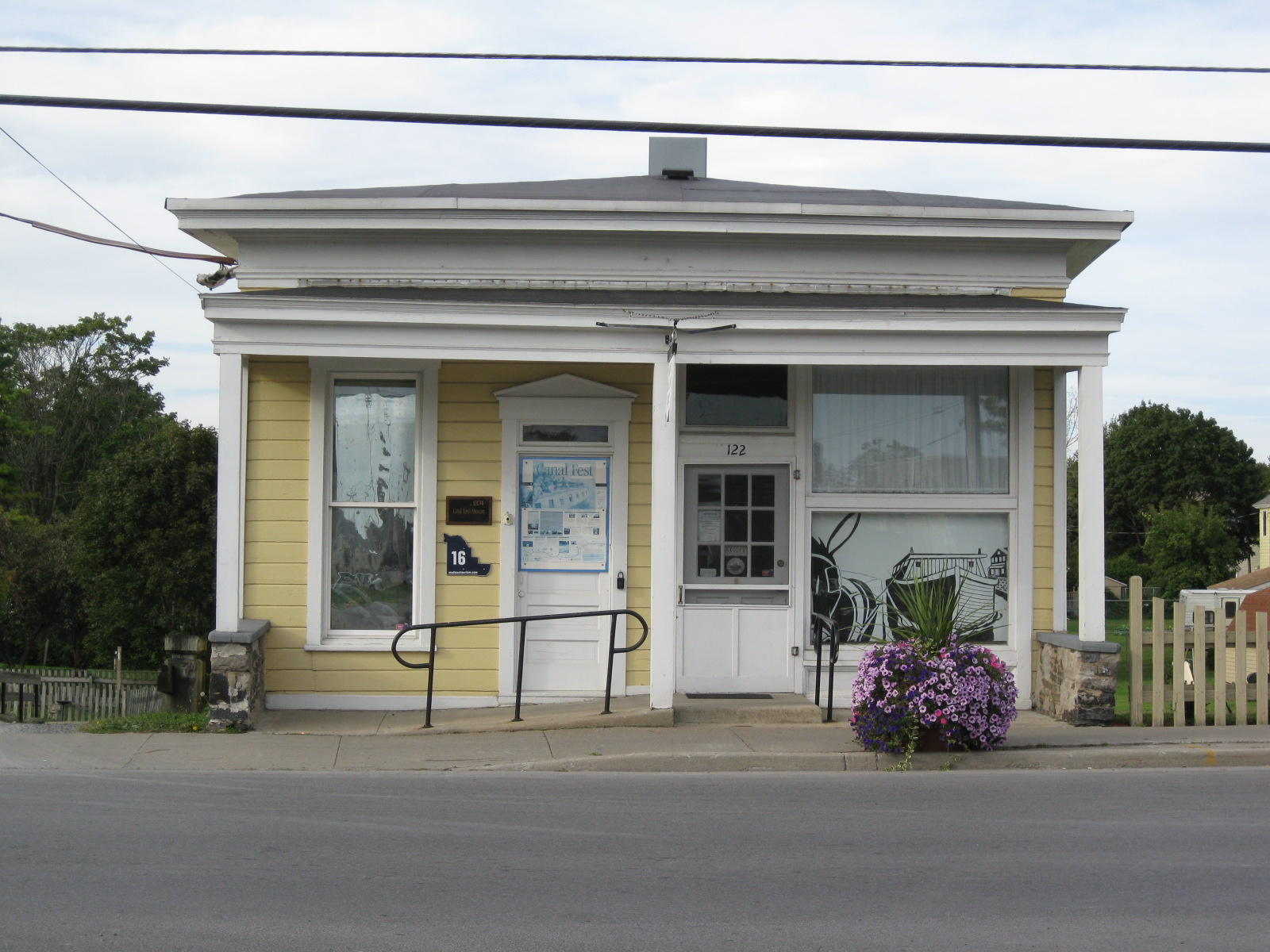
- Canal Town Museum, September 2009

- Location within New York Location within the United States
- Location: 122 Canal St., Canastota, New York
- Coordinates: 43°4′47″N 75°45′6″W
- Area: less than one acre
- Built: 1873
- MPS: Canastota Village MRA
- NRHP reference No.: 86001292
- Added to NRHP: May 23, 1986

Canal Town Museum is a former bakery and residence now housing a museum and located at Canastota in Madison County, New York. It was built about 1873 and is a small rectangular frame building surmounted by a low-pitched hipped roof. It is representative of the type of combined commercial / residential structures that once lined the canal basin in Canastota's central business district.

It was added to the National Register of Historic Places in 1986.
