= Chittenango Landing Dry Dock Complex =

- U.S. National Register of Historic Places
- U.S. Historic district
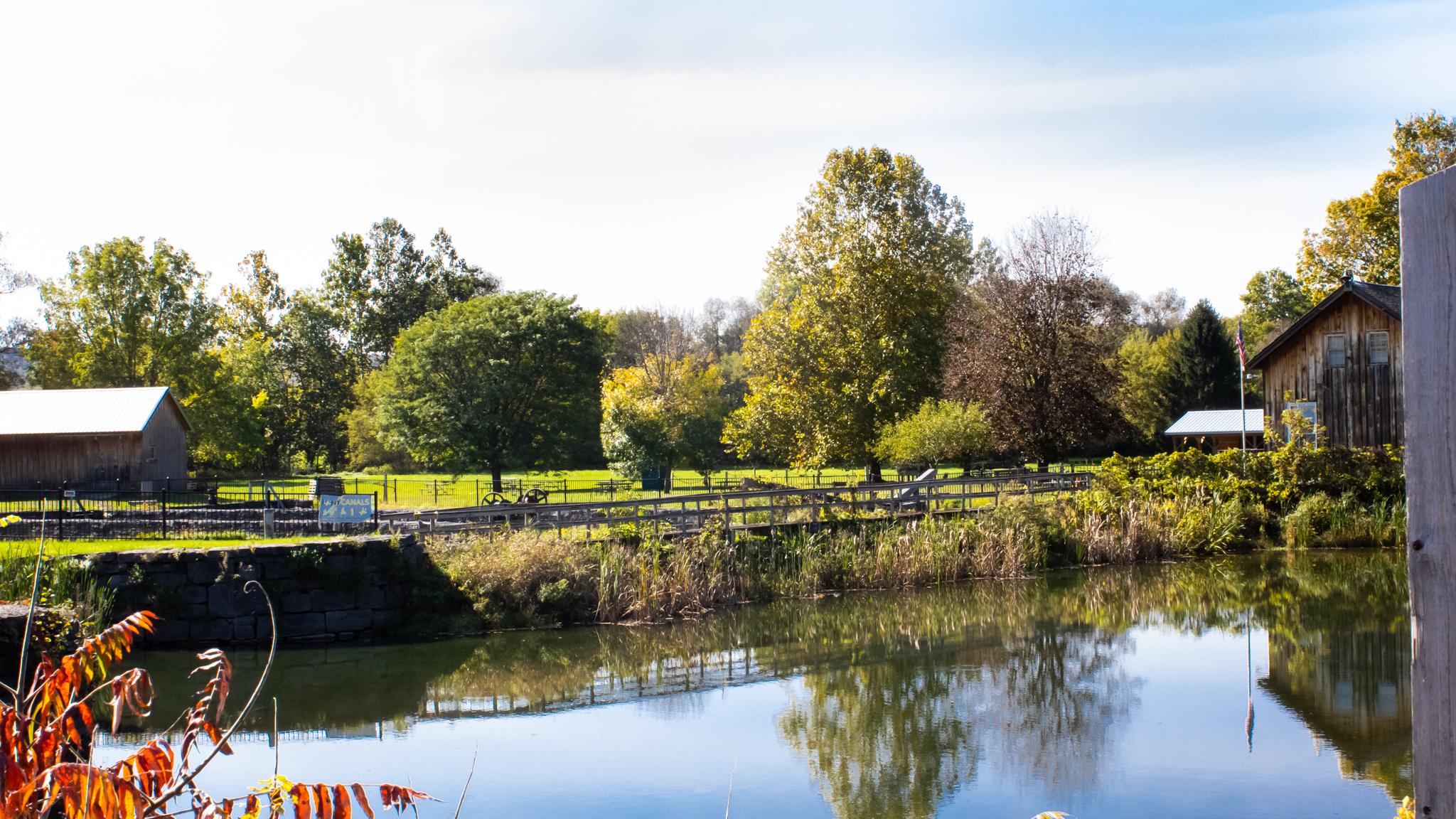

- Location within New York Location within the United States
- Location: Lakeport Rd. at Old Erie Canal, Sullivan, New York
- Coordinates: 43°3′36″N 75°52′26″W
- Area: 6.6 acres (2.7 ha)
- Built: 1856
- Architectural style: Canal boat dry dock
- NRHP reference No.: 92000458
- Added to NRHP: April 30, 1992

The Chittenango Landing Dry Dock Complex provided dry dock for canal boats on the old Erie Canal. The original complex was built in 1856 and abandoned after this section of the "enlarged" Erie canal was bypassed by the new barge canal in 1917. The current restoration began in 1986 when the original dry docks were excavated, since then several buildings have been restored, one of which acts as a museum building for the Chittenango Landing Canal Boat Museum.

The site was listed on the National Register of Historic Places in 1992. The listing includes six contributing structures over a 6.6-acre (2.7 ha) area.

The site includes three dry dock bays.

== History ==
The Chittenango Landing dry docks were constructed in 1856 as part of the enlarged canal expansion of the original "Clinton ditch" canal. Due to the similarity in construction with other nearby dry docks in Newark, Albion, and Middleport the Chittenango docks were possibly constructed by the same contractor.

The dry dock property was first purchased for $1400.00 from the Yates Estate in 1856 and changed ownership numerous times during its existence.

After the enlarged canal ceased operation, the Chittenango Landing site was used for agricultural operations, the barn at the site was used to house horses, cows, and chickens through the first half of the twentieth century. The site's warehouse was also cut in half and moved, using block and tackle, to a new location behind the site's sawmill where it was used as an icehouse. The site was also subject to scavenging of wood from its building and abandoned barge, the Beech Nut. In 1950, stones were removed from the dry-docks’ walls for use in construction of the New York State Thruway. Two canal era residences still remained on the property as late as 1972.

== See also ==
- Chittenango, New York
- Old Erie Canal State Historic Park
