= Lee Kump =

American professor

Lee R. Kump is a professor of geosciences at Pennsylvania State University and a fellow of the American Geophysical Union. He is currently the Dean of the College of Earth and Mineral Sciences at Pennsylvania State University. His research interests include biogeochemical cycles, environmental biogeochemistry, and atmosphere/ocean evolution. With James Kasting, he is the co-author of the popular textbook The Earth System.

Kump highlights the relationship between the climate crisis and mass extinction in Earth's history: “The rate at which we’re injecting CO_{2} into the atmosphere today, according to our best estimates, is 10 times faster than it was during the End-Permian [...] And rates matter. So today we’re creating a very difficult environment for life to adapt, and we’re imposing that change maybe 10 times faster than the worst events in earth’s history.”
