= Fish Creek (Oneida Lake tributary) =

- Location of the mouth of Fish Creek Fish Creek (Oneida Lake tributary) (the United States)

Location
- Country: United States
- State: New York
- Region: Central New York
- County: Oneida

Physical characteristics
- Source: East Branch
  - location: Southwest of Lowville
  - coordinates: 43°41′13″N 75°34′48″W
  - elevation: Approximately 1,980 ft (600 m)
- 2nd source: West Branch
  - location: Southeast of Altmar
  - coordinates: 43°28′04″N 75°55′21″W
  - elevation: 623 ft (190 m) (Note: The source of West Branch Fish Creek is Kasoag Lake, which has an elevation of 623 ft (190 m).)
- Source confluence
  - location: South-southwest of Taberg
  - coordinates: 43°16′09″N 75°37′59″W
  - elevation: 381 ft (116 m)
- Mouth: Oneida Lake
  - location: Sylvan Beach / Verona Beach
  - coordinates: 43°11′34″N 75°43′55″W
  - elevation: 367 ft (112 m)

Basin features
- Progression: Fish Creek → Oneida Lake → Oneida River → Oswego River → Lake Ontario → St. Lawrence River → Gulf of St. Lawrence → Atlantic Ocean
- Tributaries
  - left: Sash Factory Creek, Erie Canal
  - right: Mill Stream

Fish Creek (called Tege-soken, "between the mouths" by the Haudenosaunee) is a moderately sized river emptying into the eastern end of Oneida Lake in Oneida County, New York. Formed by the confluence of its east and west forks near the hamlet of Blossvale, the creek flows southwest for 11 miles (18 km), through the towns of Annsville and Vienna. The last mile of the creek is channelized to form part of the Erie Canal, which joins the lake at Sylvan Beach. The creek drains approximately 528.9 square miles (1,370 km^{2}) of the Tug Hill plateau country in Central New York.

The largest tributary of Oneida Lake, Fish Creek contributes about 50% of the lake's total inflow.

== Geography ==
Although the main stem is short, the East Branch stretches 42 miles (68 km), and the West Branch is 28-mile-long (45 km) long. Measured to its furthest headwaters along the East Branch in Lewis County, Fish Creek is 53 miles (85 km) long, draining parts of Oneida, Lewis and Oswego Counties. Excepting the east and west branches, the only major tributary that joins Fish Creek proper is Wood Creek, which enters from the east via the Erie Canal. Nearly all of the watershed is rural, with the only significant towns being (from roughly north-to-south) Florence, Williamstown, Camden, Annsville, and Vienna. The East Branch contributes about 46% of the total flow in Fish Creek; the West Branch 42%; and Wood Creek, about 12%.

=== East Branch ===
The East Branch Fish Creek originates in southern Lewis County, at the confluence of Sixmile and Sevenmile Creeks about 10 miles (16 km) west of Lyons Falls. It flows generally south, receiving Sucker Brook from the east and entering a narrow gorge, where it is impounded in the small City of Rome Reservoir. Below the reservoir it is joined by Florence Creek from the west, before flowing past Taberg to its mouth and confluence with the West Branch.

=== West Branch ===
The West Branch rises in marshes near Williamstown in eastern Oswego County and flows in a generally southeasterly direction. At Camden in Oneida County it is joined by the Mad River from the north, and is joined by Cobb Brook shortly below there, also from the north. Continuing southeast it receives the Little River from the west and passes McConnellsville, then flows east to its confluence with the East Branch.

== Discharge ==
Most of the water in Fish Creek originates as snowmelt from the Tug Hill, a region renowned for its extremely heavy winter snowfall. Average annual precipitation over the watershed ranges from 51 to 59 inches (1,300 to 1,500 mm); some areas of Tug Hill receive up to 196 inches (5,000 mm) of snow. Flows usually peak in April while reaching the yearly minimum during July and August. High flows during the winter (November through March) are typically the result of rainfall.

There is no stream gage on the Fish Creek proper, although the U.S. Geological Survey (USGS) operates gages on both the East and West Branches. The USGS gage on the East Branch near Taberg, recorded an annual mean flow of 543 cubic feet per second (15.4 m^{3}/s) between 1923 and 2013, with a maximum of 21,600 cubic feet per second (610 m^{3}/s) on December 29, 1984 and a minimum of 4.9 cubic feet per second (0.14 m^{3}/s) on August 15, 1949. The gage on the West Branch was only operated from 1966–68, recording an annual mean of 425 cubic feet per second (12.0 m^{3}/s). Combined with inflows from Wood Creek, the total flow of Fish Creek into Oneida Lake exceeds 1,000 cubic feet per second (28 m^{3}/s).

== History ==
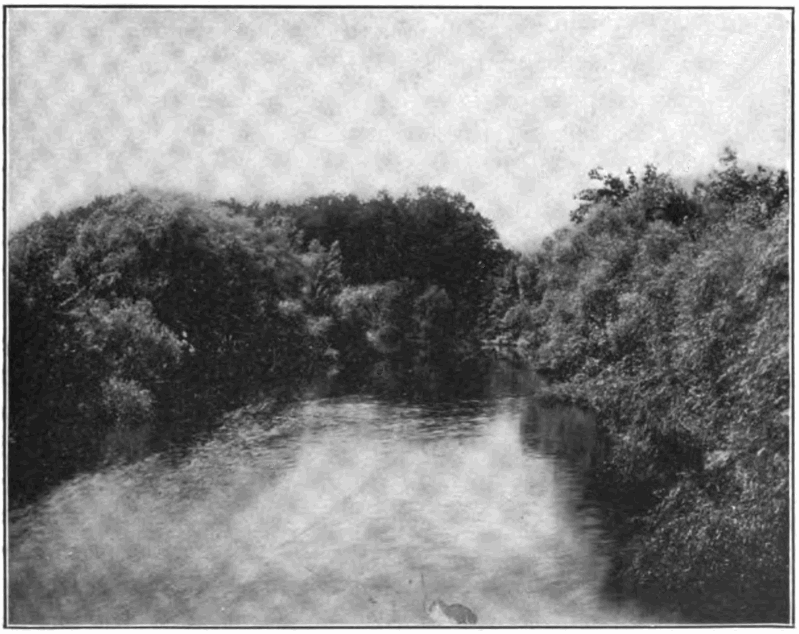
The Erie Canal stretch of Fish Creek near the confluence of Wood Creek, seen circa 1909

The name of Fish Creek may originate from the annual fishing feast once held by the Oneida people at the confluence of the East and West forks. During the spring stakes were placed across the width of the creek to support a temporary brush dam. The Indians then drove all the fish (including prodigious runs of Atlantic salmon) from upstream down to the barrier before a second brush dam was constructed to trap them, at which point they were easily collected with spears and nets. The subsequent feast was divided equally between every family in the tribe.

After the construction of dams on the Oswego River, which carries the outflow of Oneida Lake (the Oneida River) to Lake Ontario, the St. Lawrence River and the Atlantic Ocean, salmon disappeared from Fish Creek, although they were reintroduced in 1997.

== Human use ==
The East Branch is dammed once at Kessinger Dam, completed in 1909, which provides part of the water supply for nearby Rome. Water is diverted through a 1 mile (1.6 km) tunnel and a 7-mile (11 km) pipeline to various reservoirs around the city. A smaller tributary, Florence Creek, has also been dammed at Glenmore since 1926 to provide water to the city of Oneida.

== Recreation ==
The upper part of the East Branch is stocked with brook trout, while many other reaches of the East and West Branches have good fishing for wild brook, brown and rainbow. Between Point Rock and Taberg, the East Branch flows through a steep gorge known for its difficult whitewater. The 9.4 miles (15.1 km) stretch, sometimes known as the "River of No Return", is rated class II–IV by American Whitewater. Part of the East Branch was considered for National Wild and Scenic Rivers System designation in 1978, but was not passed due to a lack of local support.

== See also ==
- List of rivers of New York
