= Harden =

Harden may refer to:

== Places ==
- Harden, New South Wales, Australia
  - Harden railway station
  - Harden County
- Harden, Walsall, England
- Harden, West Yorkshire, England
- Harden City, Oklahoma, U.S.
- Harden (crater), on the Moon

== Other uses ==
- "Harden", a song by Lil Wayne from the album Funeral
- Hardens, historic home and farm in Charles City County, Virginia, U.S.
- Harden's, a British restaurant guide
- Harden Furniture, an American furniture manufacturer 1844–2018

== People with the given name Harden ==
- Harden Askenasy (1908–1975), Romanian Jewish scientist and professor of neurosurgery
- Harden Bennion (1862–1936), American politician
- Harden Cooper (1922–1990), American football player and coach
- Harden Dean (1913–1982), Australian rules footballer
- Harden M. McConnell (1927–2014), American chemist
- Harden Sidney Melville (1821–1894), English painter, illustrator and draughtsman

== People with the surname Harden ==
- Alex Harden (born 1993), American basketball player
- Alice Harden (1948–2012), American politician from Mississippi
- Arlene Harden (born 1945), American country music singer
- Arthur Harden (1865–1940), British biochemist
- Blaine Harden (born 1952), American journalist and author
- Bobby Harden (born 1967), American football player
- Buddy Harden (born 1940), American politician
- Cecil M. Harden (1894–1984), American educator and politician
- Cedric Harden (born 1974), American football player
- Chad Harden (born 1970), Canadian professional chuckwagon racer
- Clinton Harden (1947–2025), American politician from New Mexico
- Derrick Harden (born 1964), American football player
- Duane Harden (born 1971), German-born American musician
- Edgar L. Harden (1906–1996), American university president
- Frank Harden (1922–2018), American radio announcer
- Geoff Harden (1943–2006), British journalist and folk music promoter
- Greg Harden (fl. from 1986), American life coach and motivational speaker
- Gwen Harden (born 1940), Australian botanist and author
- Henry Eric Harden (1912–1945), English recipient of the Victoria Cross
- Henry Scott Harden (1834–1879), Australian politician
- Ingo Harden (born 1928), German music critic and writer
- James Harden (born 1989), American basketball player
- Janet Harden (1776–1837), Scottish diarist, also known as Jessy
- Joel Harden (born c. 1972), Canadian politician
- John Harden (1871–1931), Irish bishop
- Jonathan Harden (fl. from 2001), Northern Irish actor and director
- Joseph Harden (1824–1864), African American missionary
- Kathryn Paige Harden (fl. 2013–2016), American government official
- Krysta Harden (fl. 2013–2016), American government official
- Leon Harden (1947–2017), American football player
- Marcia Gay Harden (born 1959), American actress
- Martin Harden (1876–unknown), Czech fencer
- Maximilian Harden (1861–1927), German journalist
- Michael Harden (born 1981), American football player
- Mike Harden (born 1959), American football player
- Myles Harden (born 2001), American football player
- Paige Harden (fl. from 2009), American psychologist
- Rich Harden (born 1981), Canadian baseball player
- Richard Harden (cricketer) (born 1965), English cricketer
- Richard Harden (politician) (1916–2000), Northern Irish politician
- Robert Harden (born 1960), American politician from Florida
- Rupert Harden (born 1985), Australian-born English rugby player
- Sheldon Harden (1920–2005), American football player
- Theodore Harden (1830–1900), Australian politician
- Thomas C. Harden (c.1856 – 1925), American politician from New York
- Tim Harden (born 1974), American athlete
- TJ Harden (born 2004), American football player
- Ty Harden (born 1984), American soccer player
- Wilbur Harden (1924–1969), American jazz musician
- Wolf Harden (born 1962), German classical pianist

== See also ==
- Hardening (disambiguation)
- Hardin (disambiguation)
