= Hardin =

Hardin may refer to:

== Places in the United States ==
- Hardin, Illinois, in Calhoun County
- Hardin County, Illinois
- Hardin, Iowa, in Clayton County
- Hardin County, Iowa
- Hardin, Kentucky, in Marshall County
- Hardin County, Kentucky
- Hardin, Missouri
- Hardin, Montana
- Hardin City, Nevada
- Hardin, Ohio, in Shelby County
- Hardin County, Ohio
  - Hardin County Airport
- Hardin County, Tennessee
- Hardin, Texas, in Liberty County
- Hardin County, Texas

== Places in Lebanon ==
- Hardine, a village in Batroun District, North Lebanon Governorate, Lebanon

== Other uses ==
- Hardin (surname), including a list of people with the name
- Salvor Hardin, a fictional character in the Foundation series created by Isaac Asimov
- Hardin, a fictional character in the Fire Emblem franchise
- Hardin Scott, one of the protagonists in the novel After
- Hardin College (disambiguation)

== See also ==
- Harden (disambiguation)
- Hardin Township (disambiguation)
- Buddy Holly (Charles Hardin Holley, 1936–1959), American singer
- Hardin v. Boyd, an 1885 U.S. Supreme Court case
