= New York State Route 183 =

State highway in Oswego County, New York, US

New York State Route 183
- Map of Oswego County in central New York with NY 183 highlighted in red

Route information
- Maintained by NYSDOT
- Length: 4.73 mi (7.61 km)
- Existed: 1930–present

Major junctions
- South end: NY 69 in Amboy
- North end: NY 13 in Williamstown

Location
- Country: United States
- State: New York
- Counties: Oswego

Highway system
- New York Highways; Interstate; US; State; Reference; Parkways
| ← NY 182 | → NY 184 |

New York State Route 183 (NY 183) is a state highway located within Oswego County, New York, in the United States. The southern terminus is at an intersection with NY 69 in the hamlet of Amboy Center within the town of Amboy. Its northern terminus is at a junction with NY 13 in the hamlet of Williamstown within the town of the same name.

== Route description ==
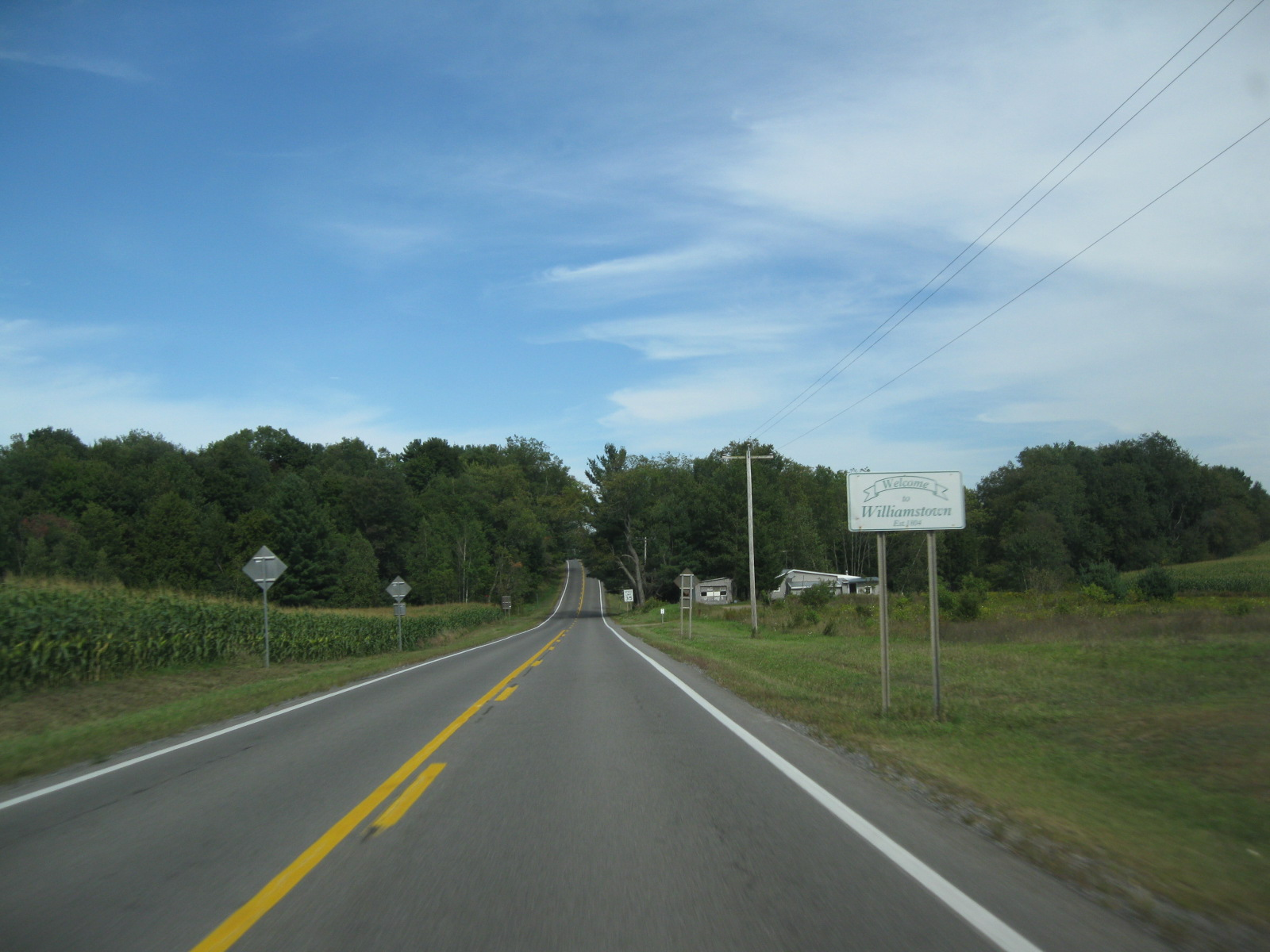
NY 183 approaching the town line of Williamstown

NY 183 begins at an intersection with NY 69 in the hamlet of Amboy Center (within the town of Amboy) as a continuation of County Route 23 (CR 23). NY 183 winds northward through the hamlet of Amboy Center around Hotel Pond. North of Amboy Center, the route crosses through the fields and power lines in the town of Amboy, entering the hamlet of Mud Hill. In Mud Hill, the route remains straight, passing some homes on the side of Little Pond. After leaving Mud Hill, NY 183 passes west of a former alignment of itself, winding northeast into dense woods until Smith Drive, where yet another pond is passed. Now proceeding northeast, NY 183 crosses into the town of Williamstown.

In Williamstown, NY 183 winds through fields of Williamstown, entering a five-way intersection with Grant Road, Gifford Road, Stone Hill Road and Sargent Davis Road. The route bends further to the northeast, entering the hamlet of Williamstown, passing baseball fields and a local cemetery. A short distance later, NY 183 meets with NY 13 at a T-intersection in the center of Williamstown. This intersection serves as the northern terminus of NY 183.

== History ==
NY 183 was assigned as part of the 1930 renumbering of state highways in New York. It originally began at NY 69 in Amboy Center and continued north through Williamstown to the hamlet of Redfield. In Williamstown, NY 183 had a short overlap with NY 13. NY 183 was truncated on its northern end to NY 13 in Williamstown c. 1940. The former routing of NY 183 north of Williamstown is now part of CR 17.

== Major intersections ==
The entire route is in Oswego County.

| Location | mi | km | Destinations | Notes |
|---|---|---|---|---|
| Amboy | 0.00 | 0.00 | NY 69 – Camden, Parish | Southern terminus; hamlet of Amboy Center |
| Williamstown | 4.73 | 7.61 | NY 13 | Northern terminus |
1.000 mi = 1.609 km; 1.000 km = 0.621 mi
