= Dorrance House =

Dorrance House may refer to:

- Arthur Dorrance House, Merchantville, New Jersey, listed on the National Register of Historic Places (NRHP)
- W. H. Dorrance House, Camden, New York, on the NRHP
- Capt. George Dorrance House, Foster, Rhode Island, on the NRHP
- John M. Dorrance House, in Courtlandt Place, Houston, Texas, on the NRHP

== See also ==
- Dorrance Inn, Sterling, Connecticut, on the NRHP
- Dorrance Mansion, Bristol, Pennsylvania, on the NRHP
