= Wickwire =

Wickwire is a surname. Notable people with the surname include:

- Chester Wickwire (1913–2008), American civil rights activist
- Harry H. Wickwire (1868–1922), Canadian lawyer and politician
- Jim Wickwire (born 1940), American mountain climber
- John Wickwire (1899–1994), Canadian politician
- Nancy Wickwire (1925–1974), American actress

== See also ==
- Wickwire Hill, a summit in New York
