= Pond Hill (Oneida County, New York) =

Mountain in New York, United States

- Location within New York Location within the United States

Highest point
- Elevation: 843 feet (257 m)
- Coordinates: 43°19′25″N 75°40′13″W

Geography
- Location: WNW of Taberg, New York, U.S.
- Topo map: USGS Camden East

Pond Hill is a summit located in Central New York Region of New York located in the Town of Annsville in Oneida County, west-northwest of Taberg.
