= Harding Township =

Harding Township may refer to:

- Harding Township, New Jersey
  - Harding Township School District
- Harding Township, Ramsey County, North Dakota, in Ramsey County, North Dakota
- Harding Township, Lucas County, Ohio

== See also ==
- Hardin Township (disambiguation)
