= Hardin Township, Iowa =

Hardin Township, Iowa may refer to one of the following places in Iowa:

- Hardin Township, Greene County, Iowa
- Hardin Township, Hardin County, Iowa
- Hardin Township, Johnson County, Iowa
- Hardin Township, Pottawattamie County, Iowa
- Hardin Township, Webster County, Iowa

== See also ==
- Hardin Township (disambiguation)
