= Corkin Hill =

Mountain in New York, United States

- Location within New York Location within the United States

Highest point
- Elevation: 915 feet (279 m)
- Coordinates: 43°21′45″N 75°41′08″W

Geography
- Location: NW of Taberg, New York, U.S.
- Topo map: USGS Camden East

Corkin Hill is a summit located in Central New York Region of New York located in the Towns of Annsville and Florence in Oneida County, northwest of Taberg.
