= Annsville, New York =

- Town
- Location in Oneida County and the state of New York.
- Coordinates: 43°20′23″N 75°36′57″W
- Country: United States
- State: New York
- County: Oneida

Government
  - Type: Town Council
  - Town Supervisor: Stacey Vaile (R)
  - Town Council: Members' List: • Whitney Cook (D); • Mark A. Trnchik (D); • James Armstrong (R); • Michael Nobis, Jr. (D)

Area
  - Total: 60.48 sq mi (156.63 km^{2})
  - Land: 60.17 sq mi (155.83 km^{2})
  - Water: 0.31 sq mi (0.80 km^{2})
- Elevation: 869 ft (265 m)

Population (2020)
  - Total: 2,639
  - Density: 43.8/sq mi (16.93/km^{2})
- Time zone: UTC-5 (Eastern (EST))
  - Summer (DST): UTC-4 (EDT)
- ZIP Codes: 13471 (Taberg); 13308 (Blossvale); 13316 (Camden)
- Area code: 315
- FIPS code: 36-02253
- GNIS feature ID: 0978683
- Website: Town of Annsville

Annsville is a town in Oneida County, New York, United States. At the 2010 census the town population was 3,012. The town is named after Ann Bloomfield, wife of a founder.

The town is in the northwestern part of the county.

== History ==
Annsville was settled in April 1793 when John W. Bloomfield moved from Burlington, New Jersey to what is now the hamlet of Taberg, and erected a saw mill and a grist mill.

=== Land ===
Annsville's territory is land first acquired by John and Nicholas Roosevelt in 1791 from the New York State Land Commission. This patent was for 530,000 acres situated in present Oswego and Oneida counties. Approximately 499,000 acres of the Roosevelt Tract became Scriba’s Patent in 1793 as partial payment of debts owed to the Scriba Bank by the Roosevelts. The land was divided into Townships at this time. Annsville contains portions of towns 1,2,3, and 8.

=== Early settlers ===
Early settlers of the northern part of the town include Benjamin, Jonathan, James, and Abraham Morton (brothers) who arrived from Springfield, Massachusetts in June 1803. Daniel Miller arrived from Granville, Massachusetts in 1804. Jonathan and Samuel Stanford arrived in 1805, and Peter Abbott, revolutionary war veteran, from Windham, Vermont in 1806.

Also arriving in 1806 was Elias Brewster, who moved from the nearby town of Western, having arrived there from Connecticut in 1790. Other settlers to the town were Adam P. Campbell, Nicholas Armstrong, and Dan Taft.

=== Commerce ===
In addition to farming, much of the early economic activity was related to lumber, made possible by the abundance of trees and the water power of streams to run saw mills. Lumber and various lumber products were manufactured in large quantity. Pig iron was produced by the Oneida Iron and Glass Manufacturing Company from around 1811.

The railroad reached Annsville with the construction of the Watertown & Rome Railroad, later the Rome, Watertown and Ogdensburg Railroad, with a station near the hamlet of Taberg in the 1840s.

=== Civic formation ===
The town was formed on April 12, 1823, from land taken from Lee, Florence, Camden and Vienna. The town was named after Ann Bloomfield, wife of John W. Bloomfield. The first town meeting was held on March 2, 1824. The following positions were filled: town supervisor, town clerk, assessors (3), commissioners of highways (3), overseers of the poor (2), collector, commissioners of schools (3), inspectors of schools (3), constables (3), poundmasters (2).

== Geography ==
According to the United States Census Bureau, the town has a total area of 60.5 square miles (157 km^{2}), of which 60.2 square miles (156 km^{2}) is land and 0.3 square miles (0.78 km^{2}) (0.48%) is water.

The northern town line is the border of Lewis County, directly northwest of the town of Taberg.

== Demographics ==
Historical population
Census	Pop.	Note	%±
1830	1,481		—
1840	1,765		19.2%
1850	2,688		52.3%
1860	2,837		5.5%
1870	2,716		−4.3%
1880	2,554		−6.0%
1890	2,068		−19.0%
1900	1,744		−15.7%
1910	1,449		−16.9%
1920	1,353		−6.6%
1930	1,242		−8.2%
1940	1,217		−2.0%
1950	1,333		9.5%
1960	1,635		22.7%
1970	1,917		17.2%
1980	2,389		24.6%
1990	2,786		16.6%
2000	2,956		6.1%
2010	3,012		1.9%
2020	2,639		−12.4%
U.S. Decennial Census

As of the census of 2000, there were 2,956 people, 1,061 households, and 790 families residing in the town. The population density was 49.1 inhabitants per square mile (19.0/km^{2}). There were 1,144 housing units at an average density of 19.0 per square mile (7.3/km^{2}). The racial makeup of the town was 96.75% White, 2.33% African American, 0.24% Native American, 0.07% Asian, 0.10% from other races, and 0.51% from two or more races. Hispanic or Latino of any race were 0.88% of the population.

There were 1,061 households, out of which 38.8% had children under the age of 18 living with them, 57.4% were married couples living together, 9.9% had a female householder with no husband present, and 25.5% were non-families. 21.5% of all households were made up of individuals, and 6.7% had someone living alone who was 65 years of age or older. The average household size was 2.74 and the average family size was 3.16.

In the town, the population was spread out, with 29.8% under the age of 18, 7.4% from 18 to 24, 33.2% from 25 to 44, 20.6% from 45 to 64, and 9.0% who were 65 years of age or older. The median age was 34 years. For every 100 females, there were 111.0 males. For every 100 females age 18 and over, there were 107.8 males.

The median income for a household in the town was $35,804, and the median income for a family was $42,841. Males had a median income of $30,000 versus $21,541 for females. The per capita income for the town was $15,012. About 8.7% of families and 12.4% of the population were below the poverty line, including 19.7% of those under age 18 and none of those age 65 or over.

== Communities and locations in Annsville ==
- Blennes Corner – A location in the southwestern part of the town.
- Blossvale – A hamlet near the southern town line, named after the Bloss family, who were early settlers of the area. A former railway station was located here
- Bowman Hill – An elevation located northeast of Taberg.
- Corkin Hill – An elevation located north of Pond Hill. Partially in the Town of Florence.
- Finn Hill – An elevation located north of Taberg.
- Glenmore – A hamlet in the south central part of the town.
- McConnellsville – Home to Harden Furniture Co. one of the largest employers in town.
- Pond Hill – The area surrounding "Mack Pond", west of Taberg on Route 69.
- Taberg – A hamlet in the southeastern part of the town on Route 69.

== State Forests ==
The following New York State Forests are located wholly or partially in Annsville:

- Cobb Brook State Forest
- Fall Brook State Forest
- Fish Creek State Forest
- Furnace Creek State Forest

== Notable person ==
- Calvin Kingsley, (1812–1870), born in Annsville, became a bishop of the Methodist Episcopal Church.

== Notable event ==
On the night of April 14, 1907, a two engine, sixty-car freight train derailed, killing one fireman. See Blossvale crash of 1907.
