= Florence, New York =

- Town
- Location in Oneida County and the state of New York.
- Coordinates: 43°25′11″N 75°44′16″W
- Country: United States
- State: New York
- County: Oneida

Government
  - Type: Town Council
  - Town Supervisor: Scott P. Outtrim (D)
  - Town Council: Members' List: • Bryon Sherwood (R); • Krista Loomis (R); • Donald Secor (R); • James Graves (R)

Area
  - Total: 55.02 sq mi (142.49 km^{2})
  - Land: 54.92 sq mi (142.25 km^{2})
  - Water: 0.093 sq mi (0.24 km^{2})
- Elevation: 955 ft (291 m)

Population (2010)
  - Total: 1,025
  - Estimate (2016): 1,035
  - Density: 18.9/sq mi (7.28/km^{2})
- Time zone: UTC-5 (Eastern (EST))
  - Summer (DST): UTC-4 (EDT)
- ZIP Codes: 13316 (Camden); 13483 (Westdale); 13471 (Taberg); 13493 (Williamstown)
- Area code: 315
- FIPS code: 36-26297
- GNIS feature ID: 0978960
- Website: https://townflorence.digitaltowpath.org:10811/content

Florence is a town in Oneida County, New York, United States. The population was 1,025 at the 2010 census. The town is named after the city Florence in Italy.

The Town of Florence is in the northwestern corner of Oneida County and is northwest of the City of Rome.

== History ==
Florence was created from part of the Town of Camden in 1805.

== Geography ==
According to the United States Census Bureau, the town has a total area of 55.0 square miles (142 km^{2}), of which 55.0 square miles (142 km^{2}) is land and 0.1 square miles (0.26 km^{2}) (0.15%) is water.

The western town line is the border of Oswego County, and Oswego County and Lewis County form the northern town line.

== Demographics ==
Historical population
Census	Pop.	Note	%±
1810	396		—
1820	640		61.6%
1830	964		50.6%
1840	1,259		30.6%
1850	2,587		105.5%
1860	2,802		8.3%
1870	2,299		−18.0%
1880	2,073		−9.8%
1890	1,489		−28.2%
1900	1,207		−18.9%
1910	936		−22.5%
1920	701		−25.1%
1930	641		−8.6%
1940	620		−3.3%
1950	510		−17.7%
1960	583		14.3%
1970	610		4.6%
1980	688		12.8%
1990	852		23.8%
2000	1,086		27.5%
2010	1,025		−5.6%
2016 (est.)	1,035		1.0%
U.S. Decennial Census

As of the census of 2000, there were 1,086 people, 369 households, and 285 families residing in the town. The population density was 19.8 inhabitants per square mile (7.6/km^{2}). There were 432 housing units at an average density of 7.9 per square mile (3.1/km^{2}). The racial makeup of the town was 98.99% White, 0.28% African American, 0.28% Asian, and 0.46% from two or more races. Hispanic or Latino of any race were 0.37% of the population.

There were 369 households, out of which 43.1% had children under the age of 18 living with them, 62.6% were married couples living together, 8.9% had a female householder with no husband present, and 22.5% were non-families. 16.8% of all households were made up of individuals, and 6.2% had someone living alone who was 65 years of age or older. The average household size was 2.94 and the average family size was 3.33.

In the town, the population was spread out, with 32.8% under the age of 18, 6.3% from 18 to 24, 31.7% from 25 to 44, 20.4% from 45 to 64, and 8.8% who were 65 years of age or older. The median age was 35 years. For every 100 females, there were 107.3 males. For every 100 females age 18 and over, there were 102.2 males.

The median income for a household in the town was $36,250, and the median income for a family was $39,000. Males had a median income of $26,146 versus $21,750 for females. The per capita income for the town was $13,571. About 9.2% of families and 9.9% of the population were below the poverty line, including 10.1% of those under age 18 and 12.5% of those age 65 or over.

== Communities and locations in Florence ==
- Corkin Hill – An elevation located southeast of Thompson Corners. Partially in the Town of Annsville.
- Empeyville – A hamlet near the eastern town line.
- Florence – The hamlet of Florence is in the northern part of the town.
- Florence Hill – A hamlet southwest of Florence.
- Forty-six Corners – A location north of Empeyville.
- Hanifin Corners – A location north of Empeyville.
- Thompson Corners – A location south of Empeyville.
- Wickwire Hill – An elevation located west of Thompson Corners.
