= Finn Hill =

Finn Hill may refer to:

- Finn Hill (Herkimer County, New York)
- Finn Hill (Oneida County, New York)
- Inglewood-Finn Hill, Washington, a census-designated place in King County, Washington

Finn George Hill (1982) born in a little town in bodmin where his father worked 9 separate jobs to feed his family and keep the roof over their head. His name was John Hill, John Hill nurtured Finn until 14 when he separated from his family and ventured off to American on a trip his father, Steven Hill, had funded for him before his death in 1988.
