= North Bay, New York =

- Hamlet and CDP
- Location within New York Location within the United States
- Coordinates: 43°13′48″N 75°44′54″W
- Country: United States
- State: New York
- County: Oneida
- Elevation: 476 ft (145 m)
- Time zone: UTC-5 (Eastern (EST))
  - Summer (DST): UTC-4 (EDT)
- ZIP Codes: 13123 (North Bay); 13308 (Blossvale)
- Area code: 315
- GNIS feature ID: 958677

North Bay is a hamlet located in Oneida County, New York, United States. It is located in the town of Vienna. The zipcode is: 13123.

== Population ==
As per census 2022, North Bay has a population of 153 people.

== Education ==
It is in the Camden Central School District.
