= Bowman Hill (Oneida County, New York) =

Mountain in New York, United States

- Location within New York Location within the United States

Highest point
- Elevation: 1,329 feet (405 m)
- Coordinates: 43°24′35″N 75°35′31″W

Geography
- Location: NE of Taberg, New York, U.S.
- Topo map: USGS Point Rock

Bowman Hill is a summit located in Central New York Region of New York located in the Town of Annsville in Oneida County, northeast of Taberg.
