= Camden High School (Camden, New York) =

Coordinates: 43°20′39.24″N 75°45′20.56″W

Location
- 55 Oswego St. Camden, New York 13316; United States

Information
- Type: Public
- School district: Camden Central School
- Principal: Aaron Fiorini
- Teaching staff: 52.00 (FTE)
- Grades: 9-12
- Enrollment: 646 (2023-2024)
- Student to teacher ratio: 12.42
- Colors: Royal Blue and White
- Mascot: Blue Devil
- Website: Camden High School website

Camden High School is a public high school in the village of Camden, New York. The school district includes the towns of Camden, Vienna, Annsville, and Florence in northwestern Oneida County and the town of Osceola in southwestern Lewis County. Students come from Camden Middle School.

== Notable alumni ==
- Lynn Lovenguth, former Major League Baseball pitcher

== See also ==
- Camden (village), New York
- Camden (town), New York
