= Vienna, New York =

- Town
- Location in Oneida County and the state of New York.
- Coordinates: 43°14′N 75°44′W
- Country: United States
- State: New York
- County: Oneida

Government
  - Town Supervisor: Jason Spellicy
  - Town Council: Theodore Learned; Doug Jordan; Darrin Smith; Mary Beth McEwen

Area
  - Total: 95.08 sq mi (246.26 km^{2})
  - Land: 61.45 sq mi (159.15 km^{2})
  - Water: 33.63 sq mi (87.11 km^{2})
- Elevation: 463 ft (141 m)

Population (2010)
  - Total: 5,440
  - Estimate (2016): 5,419
  - Density: 88.2/sq mi (34.05/km^{2})
- Time zone: UTC-5 (Eastern (EST))
  - Summer (DST): UTC-4 (EDT)
- ZIP Codes: 13308 (Blossvale); 13123 (North Bay); 13157 (Sylvan Beach); 13042 (Cleveland); 13316 (Camden)
- Area code: 315
- FIPS code: 36-77486
- GNIS feature ID: 0979586
- Website: viennany.gov

Vienna /vaɪˈɛnə/ is a town in Oneida County, New York, United States. The population was 5,440 at the 2010 census. The town is named after the capital of Austria.

The Town of Vienna is in the western part of the county.

== History ==
Vienna was formed out of the town of Camden when it was divided in April 1807. The town's original name was "Orange" but shortly after the town's formation, it was renamed to "Bengal." Eight years later, in 1816, Bengal was renamed to its current name of Vienna.

== Geography ==
According to the United States Census Bureau, the town has a total area of 94.8 square miles (246 km^{2}), of which 61.5 square miles (159 km^{2}) is land and 33.3 square miles (86 km^{2}) (35.15%) is water.

The town borders Oneida Lake and the western town line is the border of Oswego County. The Erie Canal is on the southern border, near Sylvan Beach. Fish Creek defines part of the eastern town line and joins the Erie Canal near Sylvan Beach.

== Demographics ==
Historical population
Census	Pop.	Note	%±
1820	1,307		—
1830	1,766		35.1%
1840	2,530		43.3%
1850	3,436		35.8%
1860	3,460		0.7%
1870	3,180		−8.1%
1880	2,834		−10.9%
1890	2,220		−21.7%
1900	2,218		−0.1%
1910	1,904		−14.2%
1920	1,544		−18.9%
1930	1,554		0.6%
1940	1,645		5.9%
1950	2,196		33.5%
1960	2,896		31.9%
1970	3,979		37.4%
1980	5,197		30.6%
1990	5,564		7.1%
2000	5,819		4.6%
2010	5,440		−6.5%
2016 (est.)	5,419		−0.4%
U.S. Decennial Census

As of the census of 2000, there were 5,819 people, 2,192 households, and 1,565 families residing in the town. The population density was 94.7 inhabitants per square mile (36.6/km^{2}). There were 3,037 housing units at an average density of 49.4 per square mile (19.1/km^{2}). The racial makeup of the town was 97.47% White, 0.50% African American, 0.55% Native American, 0.53% Asian, 0.21% from other races, and 0.74% from two or more races. Hispanic or Latino of any race were 0.77% of the population.

There were 2,192 households, out of which 34.1% had children under the age of 18 living with them, 57.5% were married couples living together, 8.4% had a female householder with no husband present, and 28.6% were non-families. 21.8% of all households were made up of individuals, and 9.1% had someone living alone who was 65 years of age or older. The average household size was 2.65 and the average family size was 3.09.

In the town, the population was spread out, with 27.2% under the age of 18, 7.1% from 18 to 24, 29.3% from 25 to 44, 24.9% from 45 to 64, and 11.5% who were 65 years of age or older. The median age was 37 years. For every 100 females, there were 101.4 males. For every 100 females age 18 and over, there were 102.2 males.

The median income for a household in the town was $36,250, and the median income for a family was $43,871. Males had a median income of $32,337 versus $25,293 for females. The per capita income for the town was $17,195. About 6.0% of families and 8.3% of the population were below the poverty line, including 10.0% of those under age 18 and 3.7% of those age 65 or over.

== Communities and locations in Vienna ==
- Brockway Corners – A location southeast of Elpis.
- Dibbletown – A hamlet north of McConnellsville on NY 13, near the northern town line.
- Edgewater Beach – A hamlet on the western shore of Oneida Lake, north of Sylvan Beach.
- Elpis – A hamlet between Maple Flats and Thompsons Corners.
- Fish Creek Landing – A hamlet at the intersection of Vienna Road and Cook Road.
- Hall Corners – A location northwest of Jewell.
- Jewell – A hamlet on NY 49 on the northern shore of Oneida Lake.
- Long Crossing – A hamlet west of North Bay on Route 49.
- Loomis Corners – A location north of Jewell.
- Maple Flats – A hamlet near the western town line.
- McConnellsville – A hamlet north of Vienna village on Route 13.
- North Bay – A hamlet west of Vienna village on Route 49.
- Pine – A hamlet in the eastern part of the town.
- Sylvan Beach – The Village of Sylvan Beach is on the eastern end of Oneida Lake on Route 13.
- Thompson Corners – A hamlet in the northwestern section of the town.
- Vienna – The hamlet of Vienna is at the junction of Routes 13 and 49, north of Sylvan Beach village.

=== Jewell ===
Jewell is a hamlet in the town of Vienna, on the northeastern corner of Oneida Lake, near the border of Oswego County. It lies on State Route 49, approximately 30 minutes from the City of Syracuse to its west and 30 minutes to the City of Utica on the east.

The first settler is said to have been Eliphalet Jewell, who owned land there in 1814. Silas Jewell may have come about the same time. After coming to Jewell, Silas moved to Constantia for about 5 years and then came back to Jewell about 1822. Jewell was known as "West Vienna" until 1921 when the name was changed to "Jewell," in honor of the Jewell family.

Jewell was once a major town on the east–west road which parallels the Oneida Lake shoreline. In the past it was a thriving community with a store, hotel, mills, boat-building and lumber industries. A small community Church stands in the center as a testament to a time of watermills, farms, maple sap houses, and an older way of living. Home to the once famous Idel Wild Land (1820) and in the late 1900s a beautiful French piece-and-piece log mansion, built in the tradition of the French Fort, constructed as a testament to this waterfront community's revival.

The New York, Ontario & Western railroad used to serve towns on the north side of Oneida Lake, including Jewell. It was removed in 1957, to be turned into a recreational trail for horse and snowmobile riders. The trail is called the Oswego Recreational Trail to the west, in Oswego County, but has no name in Jewell's Oneida County.

== Sites of interest in Vienna ==
- The Grave of Capt. George Marsden – A staff officer to General George Washington.
- The Stone Barn

== Notable person ==
- Benjamin G. Paddock, Wisconsin businessman and politician, was born in Vienna.
