= Amboy, New York =

- Town
- Location in Oswego County and the state of New York.
- Coordinates: 43°22′24″N 75°55′40″W
- Country: United States
- State: New York
- County: Oswego

Area
  - Total: 37.74 sq mi (97.75 km^{2})
  - Land: 37.05 sq mi (95.96 km^{2})
  - Water: 0.69 sq mi (1.79 km^{2})
- Elevation: 669 ft (204 m)

Population (2010)
  - Total: 1,263
  - Estimate (2016): 1,311
  - Density: 35.4/sq mi (13.66/km^{2})
- Time zone: UTC-5 (Eastern (EST))
  - Summer (DST): UTC-4 (EDT)
- FIPS code: 36-01649
- GNIS feature ID: 0978673
- Website: Town website

Amboy is a town in Oswego County, New York, United States. It should not be confused with a populated place of the same name in Onondaga County. The population was 1,263 at the 2010 census. The town is named after a location in New Jersey.

The Town of Amboy is in the southeastern part of the county.

== History ==
The town was first settled circa 1805. The Town of Amboy was created in 1830 from part of the Town of Williamstown. With the exception of the towns of Palermo and Schroeppel, both of which were organized in 1832, Amboy is the latest town in point of formation in the county. Settlement within its borders did not begin until several years after other localities had become the home of pioneers. Amboy was organized on March 25, 1830, when it was taken from Williamstown. It lies on the east border of the county, a little south of the center. The soil of this town is a rich loam; has been productive of excellent crops of grain, and is now giving encouraging returns in dairying. The town is principally drained by small streams which are tributary to Oneida Lake. There is a series of ponds in the western part, locally known as Upper and Lower Ponds and North and South Ponds Panther Lake extends into the southeastern corner of the town from Constantia. Fish Creek flows east across the corner of the town into Oneida county. Little River rises in the central part and flows southeasterly out of the county. The north half of the town is within the gray limestone region and the southern half is a part of the red sandstone region. The town is township number six of Scriba's patent, by which it was called” Middleburgh,” and it has an area of 22,866 acres.

The first settler in this town was Joseph Perkins, who came from Connecticut in 1805; settled on the east half of lot 14; and sometime in that year opened a public house where John Jacobs now lives. He lived there until his death, being accidentally killed while working in the woods. He left a family of two sons and three daughters, but no one of his descendants is now a resident.

What has been known as the “Five Corners,” where the first settlements in the town were made, is situated about two miles north-east of Amboy Center. Settlements were slow for several years David Smith came in 1815 and located at the site of the village, near the present burial ground, where he lived until 1828, and then moved away. Isaac Claxton came in 1818 and was followed a few years later by his brother William. They purchased a large tract of land in the northeastern part of the town, where they made somewhat extensive improvements, afterwards selling out to Richard Carter and removing elsewhere in the town. They both reared families, but their descendants have mostly left this locality. John Drought came also in 1818 and settled on the east half of lot No. 139, where he lived until 1828, when he sold to Julian and Richard Carter and removed to Camden, Oneida county, and died there. The settlement known as “Carteryule,” took its name from the Carter families mentioned. At one time the place enjoyed the benefits of a post-office. It also contained a tannery, saw mill, and store, all of which were destroyed by fire in July 1883, entailing a loss of about $6,000. Isaac and John Drought, who now (1894) live there, are sons of the pioneer John.

Sage Parks came to the town in 1821 and settled on lots 14 and 29. He soon afterward sold out to John Moore and purchased lot 105, where he lived until shortly before his death, which occurred at Amboy Center. His son, John Parks, is still a resident of the town. Sage Parks was a prominent citizen; was the first supervisor; and held the office in 1830–31. He also built the first grist mill in the town in 1824; it had one run of stones and was used only for coarse grinding; it stood about three-fourths of a mile east of Amboy Center. John Hasselkus married a daughter of Sage Parks.

The first saw mill in the town was not built until 1822, seventeen years after the pioneer settlement. It was located at Carterville, and was built by Joseph Murphy.

The first school house was built in the winter of 1822—3 about two miles east of the present village of Amboy Center. A school had been taught the previous summer by Cynthia Stoddard, who was the first teacher in the town.

The few settlers prior to 1822 made such improvements as their circumstances permitted, and waited patiently for the arrival of more neighbors. They dwelt in a forest, off from the main line of travel, and were forced to depend almost wholly on themselves

Among the settlers who came in between 1821 and 1825 were John G. Howard and William Henry from Rhode Island, Horace Foote from Clinton, Gilbert Albee, Asa Brown, and Archibald Chapman. Ephraim Mowrey came to the town before 1822 and in that year opened the first regular hotel at the Five Corners, on lot 26, in a double log house. Some years later he built a large frame structure on lot No. 11 and kept the hotel there in the building which is still standing. Mr. Mowrey has no descendants in the town.

In 1824 the first religious organization was effected by Freewill Baptists, with Rev. Truman Gillett pastor, who continued until 1842. Services were held mostly in private dwellings. A small church was built largely by the pastor, just before he left.

Some other settlers prior to 1830 were Frederick Ambrose, who was the first town clerk; Anson Abels, one of the first assessors; Ephraim and Joshua L. Smith; and John Jamison, who became a prominent citizen, and died about 1885, leaving four sons and two daughters. One son, F. G. Jamison, is still a resident in the town, on the old homestead, Mr. Jamison was one of the first school inspectors and held the office of supervisor at least seven terms. Nathaniel Williams, Dorastus Green (supervisor in 1832–4), Alvin Cranson, Daniel Whitlock, Sylvanus Coon, G. W. Sergeant (born here in 1828, father of G. W. Sergeant, a prominent citizen, and still living), John Hess, Esick Look, Levi and Garrett Nichols, and others, all performed their part in subduing the wilderness, administering public affairs, and making substantial homes for themselves and their children.

Down to 1830, as before noted, township No. 6, in Scriba's Patent, was a part of Williamstown; but now the inhabitants felt that their convenience as well as the importance of their community demanded a separate town organization. A meeting was called, the necessary steps determined upon, and all went well until the question was suggested of a name for the new town. Discussion followed until a late hour without a decision, and another meeting was held for the purpose, and still a conclusion was not reached. Three other meetings were held and the question argued when finally Frederick Ambrose suggested “Amboy,” from the town of that name in New Jersey. It met with general approval and the town was organized by act of legislature dated March 25, 1830.

The population of Amboy at the various periods noted was as follows: In 1830, 699; 1835, 766; 1840, 1,084; 1845, 988; 1850, 1,132; 1855, 1,172; 1860, 1,402; 1865, 1,423; 1870, 1,431; 1875, 1,277; 1880, 1,244; 1890, 969.

The breaking out of the Rebellion found a responsive spirit of patriotism in Amboy, as in most other towns. More than 150 volunteers responded to the several calls for troops, and many of them offered up their lives for the preservation of the Union. Several of these died in Southern prison pens; nearly a score were killed in battle or died of wounds; while many more fell victims to disease. The town authorities were prompt and liberal in voting the large bounties that were paid to volunteers and in other ways gave support and encouragement to the soldiers in the field.

Amboy is essentially a farming community. Here the character of agriculture has changed considerably since the early years, when crop raising was largely the dependence of the farmers. Hops were formerly raised to some extent, but in later years dairying has largely taken the place of other pursuits; cheese-making forming the chief part of the industry. There are at present two cheese factories in the town. Following the close of the war and while there were still extensive timber forests in and near the town, quite a number of mills were built and put in operation. At one period there were ten running and producing large quantities of lumber. Now (1894) there are only two or three in operation.

The town contains seven school districts with a school house in each, which employed in 1892-3 seven teachers and were attended by 185 scholars. The school buildings and sites are valued at $2,615; assessed valuation of districts, $159,586; public money received from the State, $832.36; raised by local tax, $513.52. The school districts are designated as follows: No. 1, Carterville; 2, East Amboy; 3, North Amboy; 4, Amboy Center; 5, West Amboy; 6, Stone Hill; and 7, Mud Hill.

Supervisor's statistics of 1894. - Acres of resident lands, 21,947; non- resident, 1,644; assessed valuation of real estate, $167,935; equalized, $175,116; personal property, $4,050; value of railroads, $5,000; town tax, $1,099.27; county tax, $1,003.33; total tax levy, $2,476.40; dog tax, $62.50; rate of tax on $100, $1.44. The town constitutes one election district and in November 1894, 251 votes were polled.

The village of West Amboy is pleasantly situated in the western part of the town. It has no manufactures of consequence, and comprises the hotel kept by Philip Hess, which was burned and rebuilt in 1884, and the cheese factory by the same proprietor; the grist mill operated by Henry Bliss; and Stanton & Joslyn and Stanton & Garber, merchants. Nelson Jennings and Seeley Wakefield have blacksmith shops, and William Hall carries on a saw mill, cheese box factory, and planing mill which he built in 1885. The postmaster is Alonzo Joslyn. Among his predecessors were Nelson Cromwell, Dr. Joseph Pero, D. W. Crandall, and William Sheldon. Here was formerly an extensive tannery, which was built by Youngs & Cromwell about 1852. It passed into the hands of H. J. Brooks and was discontinued some twenty years ago. F. H. Berry was long its superintendent. A little south of the village, near what is called the "hogsback," a log hotel was early kept for a time by a Mr. Preston. Arthur Simmons at an early period had a saw mill here, while Alfred, his brother, carried on for a few years an extensive general business.

The small village of Amboy Center is situated as its name indicates, in the central part of the town. Among those formerly in mercantile business here were F. M. Tousley, that store now being conducted by David Spoon & Son; Stephen Williams; and J. N. Short & Son, whose former store is now conducted by W. E. Lewis & Co. The hotel that had been kept by J. J. O'Gara was burned in February 1892. The cheese factory here is carried on by Robert Foils. Among the postmasters have been Clay Short, F. M. Tousley, George W. Sergeant, David Wilson, Seymour Spoon, William E. Lewis, and John W. Whaley, present incumbent.

Churches. - The earliest church in Amboy was the Freewill Baptist, organized in 1824, which has been previously mentioned. This society finally ceased to exist and the church building was converted into a town hail in 1892.

The Methodist church of Amboy was organized early in the history of the town, the date not being definitely known. It was a part of the Salmon River Conference, but in 1836 became a part of the Black River Conference. The pastor at the time of the change was Rev. W. H. Gaylord. The church has always been prosperous. The church edifice was erected prior to 1850. A Methodist society was organized at Carterville about 1870, and the edifice erected in 1871.

== Geography ==
According to the United States Census Bureau, the town has a total area of 37.7 square miles (98 km^{2}), of which 37.1 square miles (96 km^{2}) is land and 0.6 square miles (1.6 km^{2}) (1.62%) is water.

The eastern town line is the border of Oneida County.

== Demographics ==
Historical population
Census	Pop.	Note	%±
1830	669		—
1840	1,670		149.6%
1850	1,132		−32.2%
1860	1,402		23.9%
1870	1,431		2.1%
1880	1,241		−13.3%
1890	969		−21.9%
1900	824		−15.0%
1910	736		−10.7%
1920	617		−16.2%
1930	507		−17.8%
1940	493		−2.8%
1950	482		−2.2%
1960	524		8.7%
1970	557		6.3%
1980	836		50.1%
1990	1,010		20.8%
2000	1,312		29.9%
2010	1,263		−3.7%
2016 (est.)	1,311		3.8%
U.S. Decennial Census

As of the census of 2000, there were 1,312 people, 468 households, and 353 families residing in the town. The population density was 35.3 inhabitants per square mile (13.6/km^{2}). There were 640 housing units at an average density of 17.2 per square mile (6.6/km^{2}). The racial makeup of the town was 96.57% White, 1.14% African American, 0.38% Native American, 0.08% Asian, 0.61% from other races, and 1.22% from two or more races. Hispanic or Latino of any race were 0.76% of the population.

There were 468 households, out of which 40.2% had children under the age of 18 living with them, 59.0% were married couples living together, 9.4% had a female householder with no husband present, and 24.4% were non-families. 16.9% of all households were made up of individuals, and 6.2% had someone living alone who was 65 years of age or older. The average household size was 2.80 and the average family size was 3.12.

In the town, the population was spread out, with 30.3% under the age of 18, 7.5% from 18 to 24, 32.5% from 25 to 44, 21.1% from 45 to 64, and 8.5% who were 65 years of age or older. The median age was 35 years. For every 100 females, there were 108.9 males. For every 100 females age 18 and over, there were 104.5 males.

The median income for a household in the town was $33,315, and the median income for a family was $34,702. Males had a median income of $30,000 versus $22,833 for females. The per capita income for the town was $14,698. About 9.5% of families and 13.5% of the population were below the poverty line, including 14.9% of those under age 18 and 6.8% of those age 65 or over.

== Communities and locations in Amboy ==
- Amboy Center – A hamlet on Route 69.
- Carterville – A hamlet in the southeastern corner of the town.
- East Amboy – A hamlet east of Amboy Center on Route 69.
- Jamison Corners – A location east of East Amboy.
- Mud Hill – A hamlet north of Amboy Center on Route 183.
- North Amboy – A hamlet near the northern town line.
- Panther Lake – A lake on the southern town boundary.
- Panther Lake – A hamlet on the town line in the southeastern corner of the town.
- West Amboy – A hamlet near the western town line on Route 69.
