= Harden Furniture =

American furniture manufacturer

- Founded: 1844; 181 years ago
- Founder: Charles S. Harden
- Defunct: 2018
- Headquarters: McConnellsville, New York, U.S.
- Owner: Big Shoulders Capital (current); Harden family (former)
- Website: www.hardenfurniture.org (defunct)

Harden Furniture (officially Harden Furniture, Inc.) was a privately owned furniture manufacturer based in McConnellsville in Oneida County, New York. It has been the oldest furniture manufacturer in the United States.

In 2019, Big Shoulders Capital acquired the company in a foreclosure sale, and after several attempts to restart manufacturing sold its machinery and equipment in October of same year. Former owner, Gregory Harden, who still owns the real estate planned to continue operations under a new company name. As of 2020, the real estate has also been sold to B&B company of Jamesville, New York.

== History ==
Harden was founded in 1844 by Charles S. Harden. It was one of the oldest family-owned and operated furniture manufacturers in the United States. After 175 years of business, the company ceased operations in 2018.
