= Camden, New York =

- Town
- Location in Oneida County and the state of New York.

- Location of New York in the United States
- Coordinates: 43°20′09″N 75°44′53″W
- Country: United States
- State: New York
- County: Oneida

Government
  - Town Supervisor: Daniel Christmas (R)
  - Town Council: Members: (R); Chad Walker (R); Richard C. Norton (R); John Gerber (R)

Area
  - Total: 54.15 sq mi (140.26 km^{2})
  - Land: 54.01 sq mi (139.89 km^{2})
  - Water: 0.14 sq mi (0.36 km^{2})

Population (2010)
  - Total: 4,934
  - Estimate (2016): 4,887
  - Density: 90.5/sq mi (34.93/km^{2})
- Time zone: UTC-5 (EST)
  - Summer (DST): UTC-4 (EDT)
- ZIP Codes: 13316 (Camden); 13483 (Westdale); 13471 (Taberg)
- Area Code: 315
- FIPS code: 36-065-11858
- Website: www.camdenny.gov

Camden is a town in Oneida County, New York, United States. The population was 4,934 at the 2010 census.

The town of Camden contains a village also called Camden. The town is in the northwestern part of Oneida County and is northwest of the City of Rome.

== History ==
The first settlement took place circa 1792. The town was formed from the Town of Mexico in 1799. Camden is home to International Wire, which is its largest employer. The town has only two stop lights, with the second one installed in 1999.

The population of Camden in 1800 was 354.

== Geography ==
According to the United States Census Bureau, the town has a total area of 54.1 sq mi (140 km^{2}), of which 54.0 sq mi (140 km^{2}) is land and 0.1 sq mi (0.26 km^{2}) (0.22%) is water.

The town is north-northwest of Oneida Lake. The western town line is the border of Oswego County.

=== Climate ===
According to the Köppen Climate Classification system, Camden has a warm-summer humid continental climate, abbreviated "Dfb" on climate maps. The hottest temperature recorded in Camden was 98 °F (36.7 °C) on August 30, 2022, while the coldest temperature recorded was −41 °F (−40.6 °C) on February 11, 1979.

Climate data for Camden, New York, 1991–2020 normals, extremes 1960–present
Month	Jan	Feb	Mar	Apr	May	Jun	Jul	Aug	Sep	Oct	Nov	Dec	Year
Record high °F (°C)	64 (18)	69 (21)	82 (28)	89 (32)	93 (34)	94 (34)	96 (36)	98 (37)	92 (33)	85 (29)	77 (25)	69 (21)	98 (37)
Mean maximum °F (°C)	51.9 (11.1)	51.0 (10.6)	62.1 (16.7)	79.6 (26.4)	85.2 (29.6)	88.5 (31.4)	89.9 (32.2)	88.8 (31.6)	86.6 (30.3)	78.1 (25.6)	67.0 (19.4)	53.0 (11.7)	91.5 (33.1)
Mean daily maximum °F (°C)	28.6 (−1.9)	30.5 (−0.8)	39.4 (4.1)	53.7 (12.1)	67.4 (19.7)	75.5 (24.2)	80.6 (27.0)	79.1 (26.2)	72.5 (22.5)	59.4 (15.2)	46.3 (7.9)	34.6 (1.4)	55.6 (13.1)
Daily mean °F (°C)	19.8 (−6.8)	20.9 (−6.2)	29.6 (−1.3)	42.9 (6.1)	55.1 (12.8)	63.8 (17.7)	68.4 (20.2)	67.2 (19.6)	60.2 (15.7)	48.7 (9.3)	37.5 (3.1)	27.0 (−2.8)	45.1 (7.3)
Mean daily minimum °F (°C)	11.0 (−11.7)	11.2 (−11.6)	19.8 (−6.8)	32.1 (0.1)	42.8 (6.0)	52.0 (11.1)	56.2 (13.4)	55.2 (12.9)	47.8 (8.8)	38.1 (3.4)	28.7 (−1.8)	19.4 (−7.0)	34.5 (1.4)
Mean minimum °F (°C)	−14.0 (−25.6)	−11.4 (−24.1)	−2.0 (−18.9)	19.3 (−7.1)	28.3 (−2.1)	38.3 (3.5)	44.9 (7.2)	44.1 (6.7)	33.9 (1.1)	25.2 (−3.8)	14.3 (−9.8)	−1.3 (−18.5)	−18.5 (−28.1)
Record low °F (°C)	−38 (−39)	−41 (−41)	−32 (−36)	0 (−18)	19 (−7)	27 (−3)	30 (−1)	32 (0)	24 (−4)	13 (−11)	−9 (−23)	−27 (−33)	−41 (−41)
Average precipitation inches (mm)	3.86 (98)	3.35 (85)	3.34 (85)	4.09 (104)	4.32 (110)	4.41 (112)	4.49 (114)	4.02 (102)	4.28 (109)	5.07 (129)	4.44 (113)	4.26 (108)	49.93 (1,269)
Average snowfall inches (cm)	41.4 (105)	38.0 (97)	17.1 (43)	2.9 (7.4)	0.0 (0.0)	0.0 (0.0)	0.0 (0.0)	0.0 (0.0)	0.0 (0.0)	1.1 (2.8)	15.6 (40)	35.2 (89)	151.3 (384.2)
Average precipitation days (≥ 0.01 in)	17.5	14.5	13.8	13.7	13.5	12.0	11.8	11.5	10.8	15.6	14.2	18.0	166.9
Average snowy days (≥ 0.1 in)	14.4	12.2	7.7	2.1	0.1	0.0	0.0	0.0	0.0	0.3	3.6	11.4	51.8
Source 1: NOAA
Source 2: National Weather Service

== Demographics ==
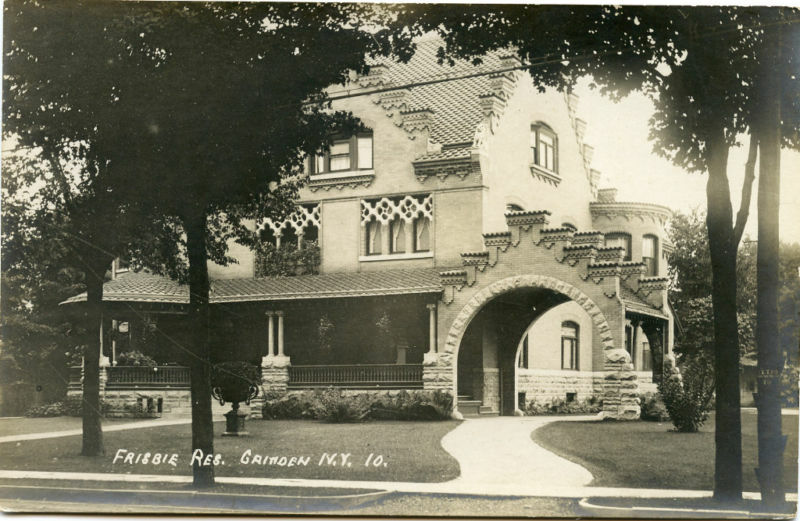
Frisbie House in Camden c. 1915

Perspective map of Camden from 1885 with list of landmarks by L.R. Burleigh

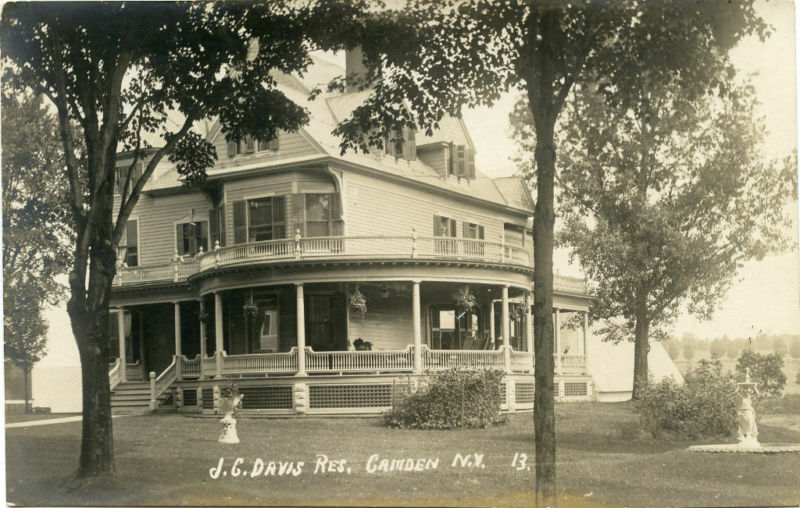
54 Union Street in Camden c. 1915

Historical population
Census	Pop.	Note	%±
1800	384		—
1810	1,132		194.8%
1820	1,772		56.5%
1830	1,945		9.8%
1840	2,331		19.8%
1850	2,820		21.0%
1860	3,187		13.0%
1870	3,637		14.1%
1880	3,392		−6.7%
1890	3,391		0.0%
1900	3,745		10.4%
1910	3,426		−8.5%
1920	3,054		−10.9%
1930	2,977		−2.5%
1940	3,096		4.0%
1950	3,655		18.1%
1960	4,318		18.1%
1970	4,942		14.5%
1980	4,925		−0.3%
1990	5,134		4.2%
2000	5,018		−2.3%
2010	4,934		−1.7%
2016 (est.)	4,887	▼	−1.0%
U.S. Decennial Census

As of the census of 2000, there were 5,028 people, 1,881 households, and 1,346 families residing in the town. The population density was 93.1 inhabitants per square mile (35.9/km^{2}). There were 2,020 housing units at an average density of 37.4 per square mile (14.4/km^{2}). The racial makeup of the town was 98.11% White, 0.38% Black or African American, 0.18% Native American, 0.44% Asian, 0.20% from other races, and 0.70% from two or more races. Hispanic or Latino of any race were 0.80% of the population.

There were 1,881 households, out of which 35.4% had children under the age of 18 living with them, 56.5% were married couples living together, 9.4% had a female householder with no husband present, and 28.4% were non-families. 24.1% of all households were made up of individuals, and 10.5% had someone living alone who was 65 years of age or older. The average household size was 2.63 and the average family size was 3.09.

In the town, the population was spread out, with 27.2% under the age of 18, 7.4% from 18 to 24, 28.0% from 25 to 44, 24.2% from 45 to 64, and 13.2% who were 65 years of age or older. The median age was 37 years. For every 100 females, there were 100.7 males. For every 100 females age 18 and over, there were 96.1 males.

The median income for a household in the town was $39,035, and the median income for a family was $44,402. Males had a median income of $31,940 versus $22,730 for females. The per capita income for the town was $18,644. About 9.5% of families and 12.1% of the population were below the poverty line, including 13.5% of those under age 18 and 17.7% of those age 65 or over.

== Education ==
It is in the Camden Central School District.

The Camden school district is the second largest geographically in New York state. It includes not only the town of Camden itself, but also part or all of the Oneida County towns of Annsville, Florence, Lee, and Vienna. It also extends into Lewis and Owsego counties, where it covers part of the Town of Osceola and the Town of Constantia, respectively.

Elementary students in the Camden school district attend one of two schools:

- Camden Elementary in the village of Camden, and
- McConnellsville Elementary in the town of Vienna.

All of these students proceed to middle and Camden High School.

== Forest Park ==
Location: Forest Park is located in Camden, off Route 13. The park starts at Ripley Drive and continues to complete a 1.75-mile lap. Emmons Brook and Cob Brook run through the park. The park is closed to everyone except skiers during the winter due to the paths being stocked with snow. Forest Park also contains an apartment building and a cemetery.

History: Forest Park was once owned and named after Mr. Alva Raymond. Before the park was owned by Raymond, the woodland area belonged to the Ransom Estate and before that it was owned by Mr Daniel Parke; both were pioneers in Camden's development. The first purchase of the park consisted of sixty-two acres in 1891. The second purchase in 1897 consisted of forty acres. The price as a whole ultimately totaled twenty-four hundred dollars. The park now consists of 117 acres and has many more pavilions.

Attractions: Most of Camden's residents visit the park during the spring and summer months. The park is an area for many leisure activities "this 117 acre park is known for its miles of paved roads for walking, jogging, and biking". The park is also home to summer picnics, family reunions and is also a hot spot for photographers. Many graduation parties and church events are held at the park as well.

Forest Park Cemetery: Forest Park Cemetery is located about a half of a mile south of Camden across from Oneida Savings Bank. Mrs. Clarissa Ranson and her husband bought the first plot in 1840. There has been a record kept of all burials in the cemetery since 1845. Many of the bodies were transferred from old Protestant cemeteries in 1876.

== Communities and locations in the Town of Camden ==
- Camden – The Village of Camden is at the junction of NY 13 and NY 69.
- Hillsboro – A hamlet west of Camden village.
- Preston Hill – A location south of Camden village.
- Westdale – A hamlet in the northwestern part of the town.

== Notable people ==
- Todd Gordon, former NASCAR crew chief and radio announcer
- Lynn Lovenguth, baseball player
- Riley Dixon, Punter Tampa Bay Buccaneers
