= Finn Hill (Oneida County, New York) =

Mountain in the United States of America

- Location within New York Adirondack Park Location within the United States

Highest point
- Elevation: 1,401 feet (427 m)
- Coordinates: 43°25′39″N 75°36′46″W

Geography
- Location: N of Taberg, New York, U.S.
- Topo map: USGS Point Rock

Finn Hill is a summit in New York in Annsville, Oneida County, north of Taberg.
