= Wickwire Hill =

Mountain in New York, United States

- Location within New York Location within the United States

Highest point
- Elevation: 1,073 feet (327 m)
- Coordinates: 43°23′31″N 75°44′36″W

Geography
- Location: N of Camden, New York, U.S.
- Topo map: USGS Florence

Wickwire Hill is a summit located in Central New York Region of New York located in the Town of Florence in Oneida County, north of Camden.
