= Hardin (surname) =

Hardin is a surname. Notable people with the surname include:

- Brian Hardin (born 1965), American politician from Nebraska
- Charles Hardin Holley (1936–1959), birth name of Buddy Holly
- Charles Henry Hardin (1820–1892), co-founder of Beta Theta Pi fraternity
- Chelsea Hardin, American beauty queen
- Clifford M. Hardin, American politician, Secretary of Agriculture
- DeVon Hardin, American basketball player
- Garrett Hardin (1915–2003), American ecologist
- George A. Hardin (1832–1901), New York lawyer and politician
- Glen Hardin, American musician/piano player
- Glenn Hardin (1910–1975), American athlete
- Jerry Hardin, American actor
- Jim Hardin (1943–1991), American baseball player
- Jo Hardin, American statistician
- John Hardin (1753–1792), American army officer
- John J. Hardin (1810–1847), American politician from Illinois
- John Wesley Hardin (1853–1895), American outlaw and gunfighter
- Joseph Hardin Sr. (1734–1801), American soldier and politician
- Julia Hardin, American baseball player
- Lil Hardin Armstrong (1898–1971), American jazz musician, second wife of Louis Armstrong
- Louis T. Hardin (1916–1999), American musician known as Moondog
- Martin Davis Hardin (1837–1923), American general
- Martin D. Hardin (1780–1823), American politician from Kentucky
- Melora Hardin, American actress
- Paul Hardin Jr. (1903–1996), American bishop
- Rusty Hardin, American attorney
- Salvor Hardin, fictional character in Isaac Asimov's Foundation series
- Terri Hardin, American puppeteer
- Tim Hardin (1941–1980), American folk musician and composer
- Ty Hardin (1930–2017), American actor
