= Lynn Lovenguth =

American baseball player (1922–2000)

- Pitcher
- Born: November 29, 1922; Camden, New York, U.S.
- Died: September 29, 2000 (aged 77); Beaverton, Oregon, U.S.
- Batted: Left Threw: Right

MLB debut
- April 18, 1955, for the Philadelphia Phillies

Last MLB appearance
- September 27, 1957, for the St. Louis Cardinals

MLB statistics
- Win–loss record: 0–2
- Earned run average: 3.67
- Strikeouts: 20
- Stats at Baseball Reference

Teams
- Philadelphia Phillies (1955); St. Louis Cardinals (1957)

Lynn Richard Lovenguth (November 29, 1922 – September 29, 2000) was an American professional baseball player. The right-handed pitcher played for 16 seasons (1946–61) in minor league baseball, with two Major League trials for the 1955 Philadelphia Phillies and the 1957 St. Louis Cardinals. He batted left-handed, stood 5 feet 10 inches (1.78 m) tall and weighed 170 pounds (77 kg).

Lynn attended Camden High School (Camden, New York) and was signed by the Philadelphia Phillies in 1946 as a free agent.

Lovenguth won 193 games during his minor league career (losing 174), including two 20-win seasons. In 1956, he was named the International League's pitcher of the year after he posted a 24–12 record and a 2.68 earned run average in 39 games and 279 innings pitched with the Toronto Maple Leafs. The native of Camden, New York, played in nine Major League organizations.

In the Majors, Lovenguth appeared in 16 games, going winless in two decisions and 20 strikeouts in 27 innings. He issued 16 bases on balls and gave up 23 hits for a 1.444 WHIP. He was given his only starting assignment in what would be his last big-league game, on September 27, 1957, against the Chicago Cubs. He went into the eighth inning with the Cardinals holding a 2–1 lead; Lovenguth had surrendered only three hits and one unearned run. But the Cubs rallied in the eighth and scored twice on three hits to pin Lovenguth with the 3–2 defeat.

Lynn Lovenguth died at age 77 in Beaverton, Oregon.
