= Blossvale crash of 1907 =

Railway incident in New York, United States

Details
- Date: April 14, 1907
- Location: Annsville, New York
- Country: United States
- Line: New York Central Railroad
- Cause: Roadbed failure

Statistics
- Trains: 1
- Deaths: 1
- Injured: 2

On April 14, 1907, northbound freight train No.23 of the New York Central and Hudson River Railroad, operating on the Rome and Richland branch of the former Rome, Watertown and Ogdensburg Railroad (later part of the New York Central) crashed when the bank on the lower side of the track failed and a section slid down the hill undermining the track. The accident occurred approximately 2.5 miles south of Blossvale, a hamlet in the Oneida County, New York, town of Annsville. The sixty-car freight train, carrying coal and other freight was pulled by engines No. 1726 and 1863. Both engines plunged down the sixty foot embankment. The lead engine came to rest in an inverted position while the second engine was on its side. Both engines and several cars were destroyed by fire. In addition to the two engines, a total of fifteen cars derailed.

Fireman E.J. Hartford, in engine 1863 was killed but engineer I.F. Losch was uninjured. The crewmen of engine 1726, engineer W.A. Darling and fireman L.B. Joyce sustained cuts and bruises. The body of fireman Hartford was not recovered until two cranes were brought to the site to remove a box car and other debris. Despite his injuries, engineer Daring walked two miles to the closest station to report the accident. Until the track was reopened, passenger trains were rerouted over the Black River Railroad line.

The accident was one of 15 derailments and one of 33 total train accidents in the United States in April 1907.
