= Hardening =

Hardening is the process by which something becomes harder or is made harder.

Hardening may refer to:

- Hardening (metallurgy), a process used to increase the hardness of a metal
- Hardening (botany) or cold hardening, a process in which a plant undergoes physiological changes to mitigate damage from cold temperatures
- Target hardening, strengthening of the security of a building or installation to protect it from attack
  - Hardening (computing), the process of securing a system against attack
- Sclerotization, a biochemical process forming cuticle in arthropods

== See also ==
- Harden (disambiguation)
- Hardness, a measure of resistance to deformation
