= W. H. Dorrance House =

Historic house in New York, United States

- U.S. National Register of Historic Places
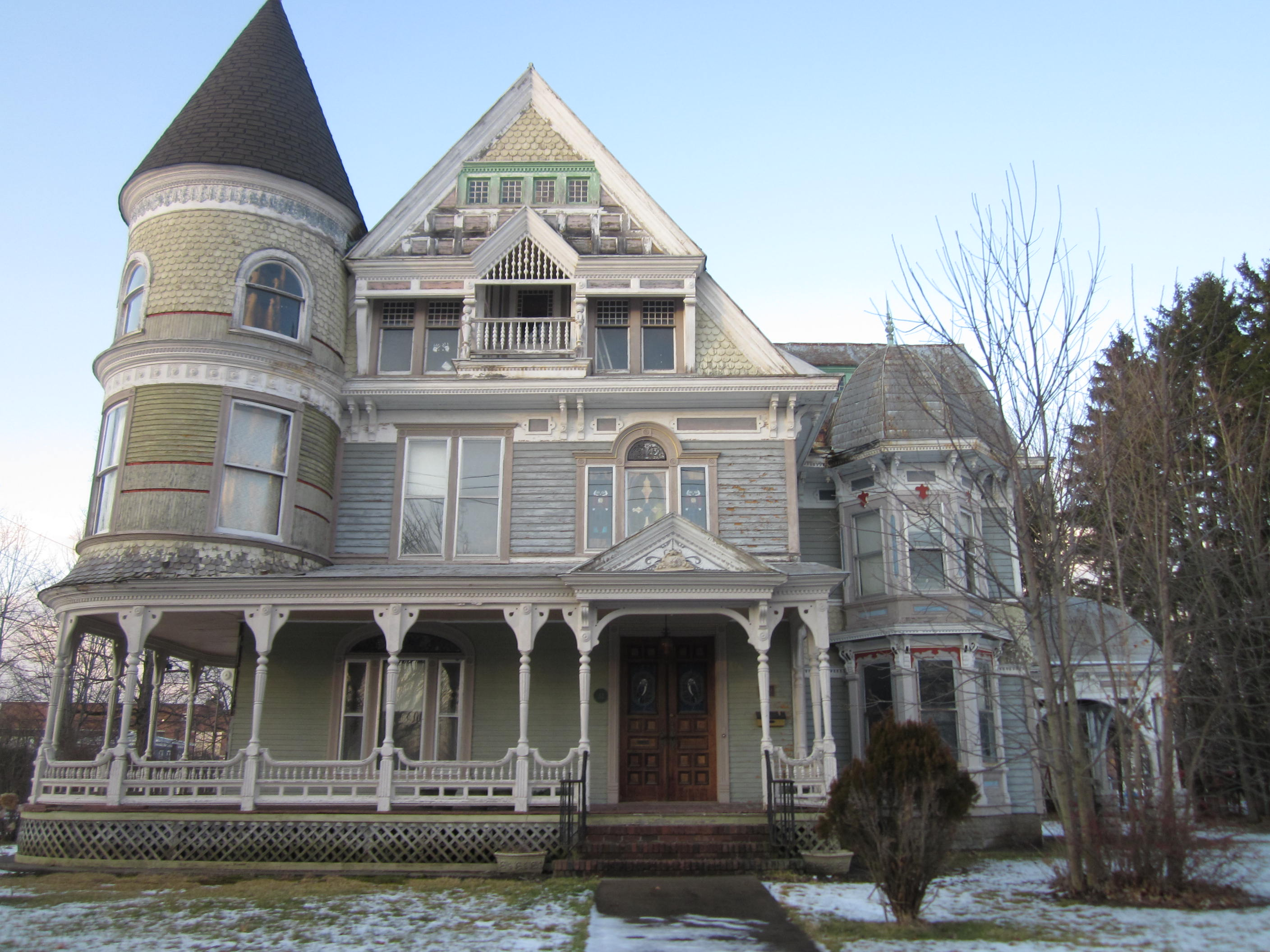

- Location within New York Location within the United States
- Location: 32 Church St., Camden, New York
- Coordinates: 43°20′11″N 75°44′39″W
- Area: 0.4 acres (0.16 ha)
- Built: 1880
- Architect: Hubbard, M. H.
- Architectural style: Queen Anne
- NRHP reference No.: 99000506
- Added to NRHP: April 29, 1999

W. H. Dorrance House is a historic home located at Camden in Oneida County, New York. According to town records, it was built about 1880 (Note: Not 1900 as the National Register or Historic Places application incorrectly states.) and is an irregularly massed, 2 1/2-story wood-frame structure in the Queen Anne style. The architect was M. H. Hubbard, based in Utica, New York. It features an engaged circular tower with conical roof.

It was listed on the National Register of Historic Places in 1999.
