= Hardin College =

Hardin College may refer to the following colleges in the United States:

- Hardin College and Conservatory of Music, a women's college in Missouri 1858–1931
- Hardin College, later Hardin Junior College, now Midwestern State University, in Texas
