= Jo Hardin =

American statistician

Johanna Sarah (Jo) Hardin is an American statistician and Hardison Chair of Analytical Thinking and Professor of Mathematics and Statistics at Pomona College. Her research involves high-throughput analysis for human genome data.

== Education and career ==
Hardin is a Pomona graduate, earning a bachelor's degree there in mathematics in 1995. She initially planned to do actuarial science, but was led to statistics by a faculty mentor, Donald Bentley. She went to the University of California, Davis, for her graduate studies, earning a master's degree in 1997 and a Ph.D. in 2000. Her dissertation, supervised by David Rocke, was Multivariate Outlier Detection and Robust Clustering with Minimum Covariance Determinant Estimation and S-Estimation.

After postdoctoral studies at the Fred Hutchinson Cancer Research Center and Seattle University, she returned to Pomona in 2002 as a faculty member. She considers John Crowley, her postdoctoral supervisor, to be her "closest mentor".

== Recognition ==
In 2015 she was elected as a Fellow of the American Statistical Association. She won the Waller Education Award of the American Statistical Society in 2007, and Pomona's highest faculty honor, the Wig Distinguished Professor award for excellence in teaching, in 2016 and 2023.
