= Todd Gordon =

American NASCAR crew chief and broadcaster (born 1969)

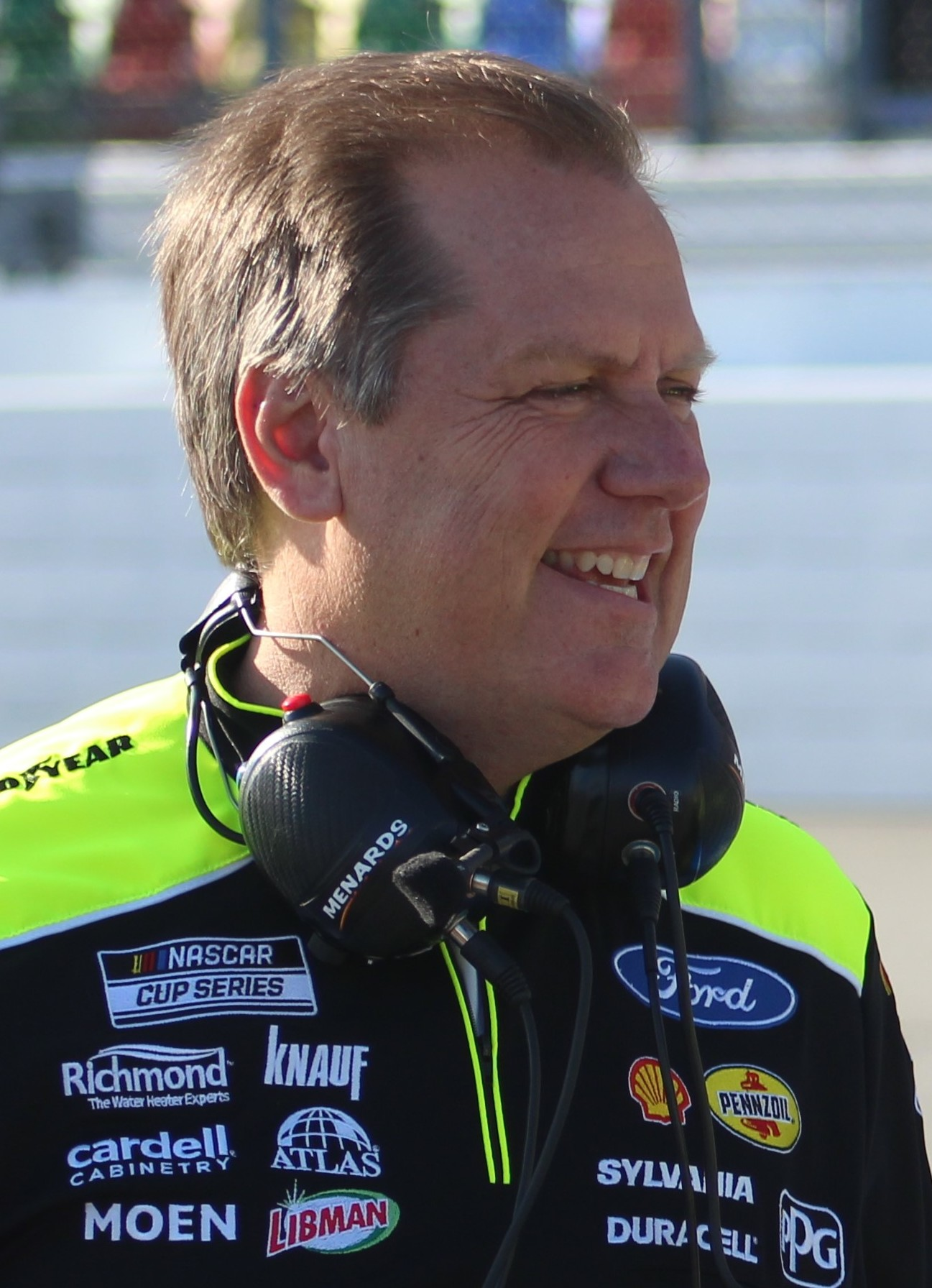
- Gordon at Daytona International Speedway in 2020

Personal information
- Born: Todd Bentley Gordon; October 20, 1969 (age 57) Camden, New York, U.S.

Sport
- Country: United States
- Sport: NASCAR Cup Series

Todd Bentley Gordon (born October 20, 1969) is an American former professional NASCAR crew chief and radio sportscaster. As a crew chief, he last worked for Legacy Motor Club as the crew chief of their No. 84 Chevrolet Camaro ZL1 in the NASCAR Cup Series driven by Jimmie Johnson. As a sportscaster, he works for Motor Racing Network commentating on NASCAR races and radio shows.

Gordon previously worked full-time as a crew chief for Team Penske in the NASCAR Cup Series from 2011 to 2021. He most recently crew chiefed their No. 12 Ford Mustang in the Cup Series driven by Ryan Blaney in 2020 and 2021. From 2013 to 2019, Gordon was the crew chief for Joey Logano on Team Penske's No. 22 car. The duo won the 2018 NASCAR Cup Series championship and scored 25 wins, which account for all but four of Gordon's wins as a crew chief in the Cup Series. Gordon was the crew chief for the No. 22 Cup car for one year before Logano drove it, when it was driven by A. J. Allmendinger and then Sam Hornish Jr. Prior to that, he crew chiefed Penske's No. 22 Nationwide Series car driven by Brad Keselowski, Kurt Busch, Sam Hornish Jr., Parker Kligerman and Jacques Villeneuve in 2011 where he led the team to the owner's championship.

== Career ==
=== Driving career ===
Gordon began his career in racing as a driver, racing supermodifieds for three years at his home track of Oswego Speedway in New York state. He built the cars he raced in his college mechanical engineering program.

=== 1998–2010: Pre-Penske years ===
Gordon began working in NASCAR mid-season in 1998 after graduating from college, getting his first job with Phil Parsons' No. 10 team in what was then the Busch Series. He left PPR for Joe Gibbs Racing in 2000, where he worked as a fabricator and later a mechanic. During the 2002 season, he left JGR for ppc Racing and began in similar roles before eventually becoming an engineer during his time there, and later made his debut as a crew chief sometime in 2004 on the No. 22 Ford of Jason Keller.

Gordon began crew chiefing permanently in 2005 for ppc Racing, calling the shots for their Busch Series No. 10 Ford driven by Mexican rookie Michel Jourdain Jr. After the team failed to qualify for the race at Chicago, Jourdain was demoted by the team from their full-time No. 10 car to their part-time No. 15 car and would only drive in select races for the remainder of the season. Replacing him was another one of the series' rookies that year, Brent Sherman, who moved over from the No. 58 Stringer Motorsports car to drive for PPC. That year, Gordon would lead the team to only one top ten finish, which was with Jourdain Jr. at Atlanta. In 2006, Sherman left for a Cup Series ride with BAM Racing and was replaced by John Andretti. However, Rick Gay served as Andretti's crew chief on the No. 10 car and not Gordon, who was the crew chief for the part-time No. 15 with Jourdain. Later in the year, Gordon replaced Randy Cox as the crew chief for the other PPC car, the No. 22 of Kenny Wallace.

Gordon joined Carl A. Haas Motorsports (formerly Travis Carter Racing) at the start of the 2007 season, where he worked on the team's No. 14 car in the Busch Series, driven by Kyle Krisiloff. He left that team for the new CJM Racing team, which moved from the Cup Series (No. 72 team) to the Busch Series (No. 11 team) during the season, and Gordon reunited with the team's driver Jason Keller as well as one race with Marc Mitchell. The team ran the full season in 2008 with Keller and Gordon returning, although Keller was replaced by rookie Scott Lagasse Jr. towards the end of the season. He also was concurrently the team's general manager.

For 2009, Gordon paired with Keller for the third time, this time at Baker-Curb Racing in the No. 27 car. They scored six top ten finishes and finished eighth in the points that year.

In 2010, Gordon did not crew chief any team, and joined Michael Waltrip Racing as the engineer for the team's No. 99 Toyota in the Nationwide Series that year, which was driven by Trevor Bayne and later the Truex brothers, Martin and Ryan, after Bayne left for the Roush Fenway Racing No. 17 car late in the season.

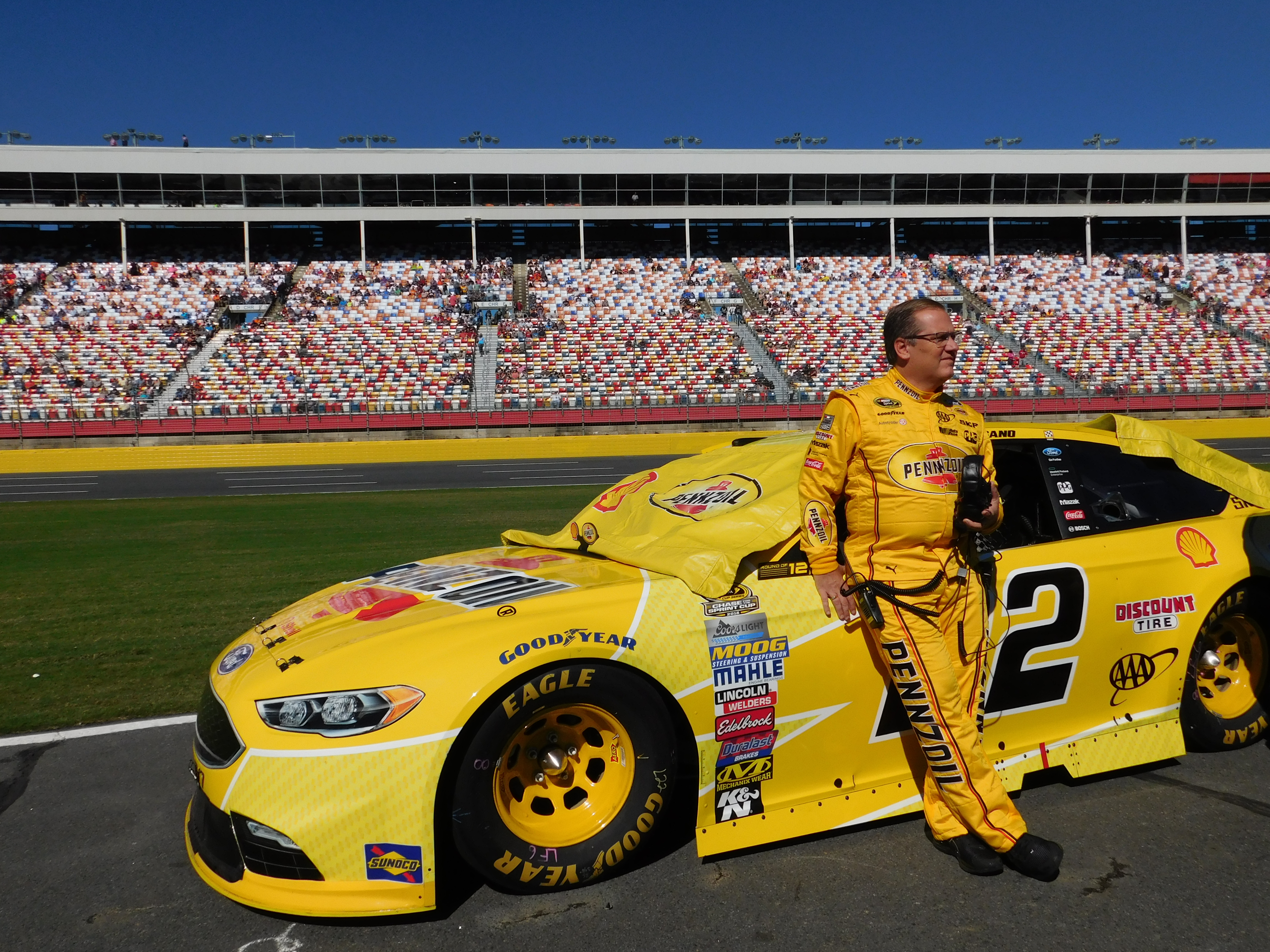
Gordon standing beside the No. 22 car in 2016

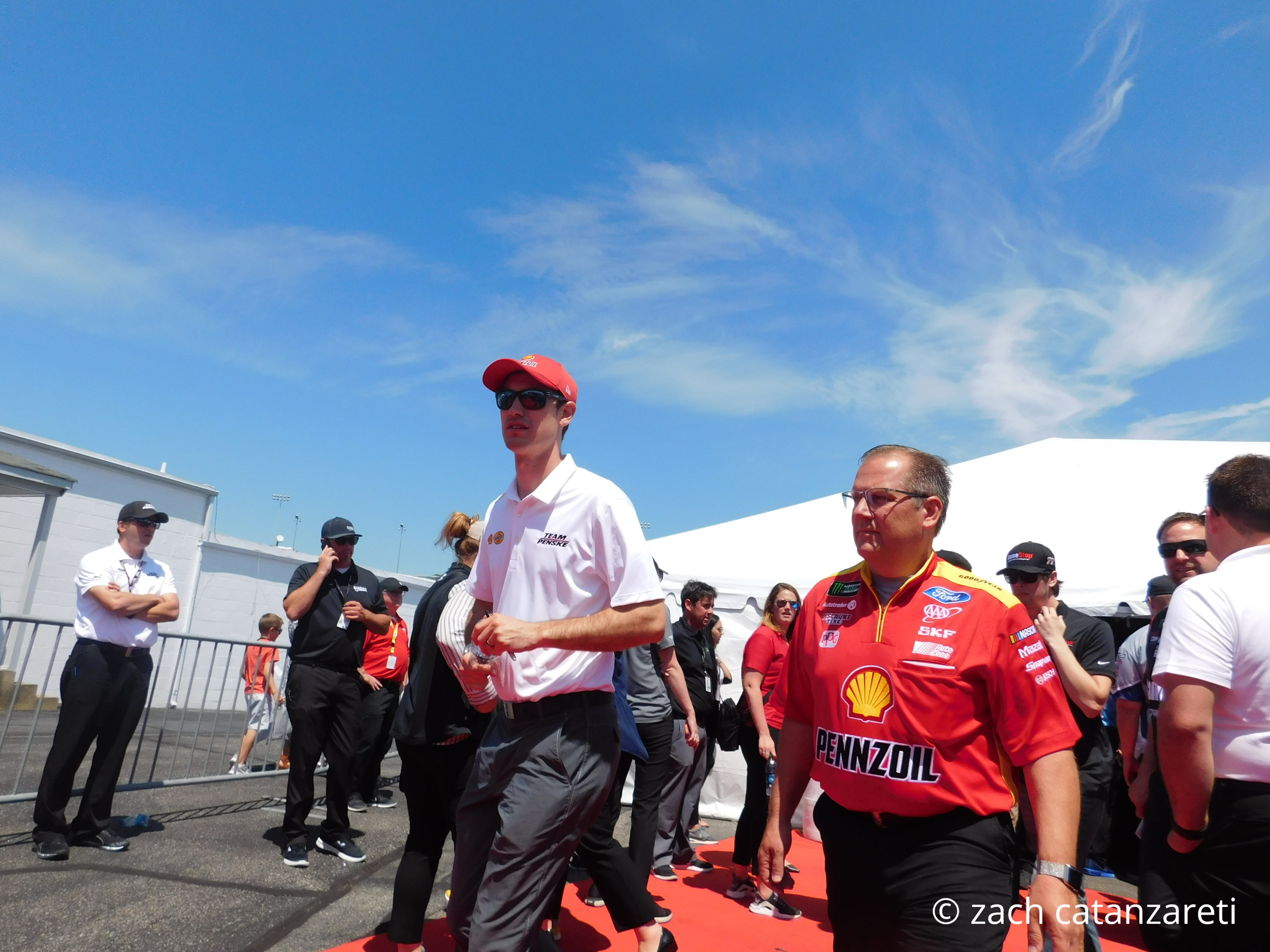
Gordon and Logano walking through the garage area at Richmond in 2017

=== 2020–2021: Ryan Blaney ===
Despite even having a solid 2019 season, Penske announced a crew chief shakeup for the 2020 season in an effort to be more competitive and dominant like the successes Joe Gibbs Racing was having. Gordon was moved from Logano's No. 22 to the No. 12 of Ryan Blaney, arguably the weakest Penske car at the time, with Blaney's crew chief Jeremy Bullins going to from Blaney's No. 12 to the No. 2 of Brad Keselowski, and Paul Wolfe switching from Keselowski's No. 2 to Logano's No. 22, replacing Gordon.

The duo started the year off with a bang, as Blaney was in contention on the last lap to win the Daytona 500, but losing in a mostly-overlooked photo finish to Denny Hamlin due to Ryan Newman's scary flip across the finish line which injured him. Solid runs at the next two races of Las Vegas and Fontana put Blaney in the points lead for two races. Blaney would crash out at the next race at Phoenix, which dropped him to sixth in points before the two-month break of the season due to the COVID-19 pandemic.

Gordon picked up his second win with Blaney in the race at Atlanta in March 2021.

On June 28, 2021, Gordon announced that he would be retiring from crew chiefing after the 2021 season.

=== 2022–present: Broadcasting career, Legacy Motor Club ===
On February 15, 2022, it was announced that Gordon would be joining Motor Racing Network as an analyst for select NASCAR races on the radio in 2022.

On January 23, 2023, it was announced that Gordon would join Legacy Motor Club to oversee co-owner Jimmie Johnson’s No. 84 Cup Series part-time schedule beginning with the 2023 season-opening Daytona 500. He was also the crew chief at Austin and Charlotte.

== Personal life ==
Gordon attended Clemson University where he earned a degree in mechanical engineering. He is from Camden, New York, but currently lives in Mooresville, North Carolina (near where most NASCAR teams are located) with his wife and two children.

== Crew chiefing record ==
=== NASCAR Cup Series ===
Note: Logano scored one more top five (and ten) at Charlotte in 2013, but that was when Steven Reis was the interim crew chief as a result of Gordon being suspended.
