= Chad Harden =

Canadian professional chuckwagon racer (born 1970)

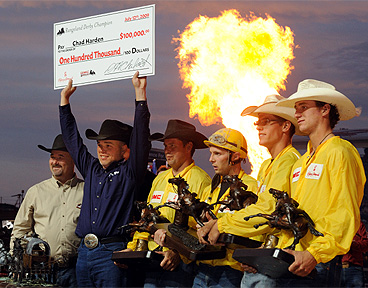
- Chad Harden with his outriders winning the 2009 Calgary Stampede Rangeland Derby
- Born: August 21, 1970
- Achievements: Calgary Stampede Rangeland Derby (2009) Edmonton's Chuckwagon Derby (2009); Ponoka Stampede Champion (2002) Battle Of the Rockies (2016)
- Statistics up to date as of August 23, 2016.

Chad Harden (born August 21, 1970) is a Canadian professional chuckwagon racer. He has won the three richest shows in chuckwagon racing: the Calgary Stampede Rangeland Derby, Edmonton's Chuckwagon Derby, and the Ponoka Stampede.

== Career ==
Harden grew up southwest of Edmonton, Alberta in the farming community of Thorsby, Alberta. He started his chuckwagon racing career driving pony chuckwagons, and began driving thoroughbred wagons in 2000 on the World Professional Chuckwagon Association (WPCA) circuit and won WPCA Top Rookie Driver honors. He qualified for his first Calgary Stampede Rangeland Derby as a driver in 2001 and won the Orville Strandquist Award for top rookie driver.

His first show championship win came in 2002 at one of chuckwagon racing's biggest events - the Ponoka Stampede. In 2006 he received the World Professional Chuckwagon Association's highest annual honor - the WPCA Chuckwagon Person of the Year. 2009 would be Harden's most successful year when he captured chuckwagon racing's two richest events when he won the Calgary Stampede Rangeland Derby and Edmonton's Chuckwagon Derby, becoming just the third driver to boast wins in both of Alberta's biggest cities in a single year. Chad was the first chuckwagon driver to win association and Calgary Stampede top rookie honors in a single year, the first driver to win the top rookie driver at the Calgary Stampede and go on to win the GMC Rangeland Derby Championship. He added the Bonnyville Chuckwagon Championship to his resume a year later in 2010.

In addition to his success on the racetrack, two of Harden's horses have been honored with WPCA Equine Outfit of Excellence awards.

On July 12, 2019, Chad Harden was involved in an incident at the Calgary Stampede chuckwagon races, along with racers Danny Ringuette and Evan Salmond, which resulted in the death of one of Salmond's horses. Harden received a preliminary fine of CA$10,000 and a 30-second penalty. Upon further deliberation, the safety commission handling the investigation declared that Harden was at fault but that there was no deliberate intent to cause the incident. As a result of the investigation, Harden was disqualified from the 2019 Calgary Stampede races, leaving his barrel unoccupied on subsequent race nights. Fellow chuckwagon driver Corey Glenn stated that he saw the "corner get crowded and the wagons drift in" which caused "just a chain reaction of misfortunate [sic] positioning" and did not believe it warranted a Stampede ban. Due to his disqualification, Harden will not be invited to return for future races at the Calgary Stampede; however, he is permitted to apply for reinstatement as early as September 1, 2019.

== Professional wins ==
=== Show wins - Driver (6) ===
- 2002 (1) Ponoka Stampede Champion
- 2009 (2) Calgary Stampede Rangeland Derby Champion Driver, Edmonton's Chuckwagon Derby
- 2010 (1) Bonnyville Chuckwagon Championship
- 2016 (1) Battle of the Rockies
- 2019 (1) Century Downs Racetrack and Casino Aggregate

== Awards ==
- WPCA Top Rookie Driver (2000)
- Orville Strandquist Award (2001)
- Chuckwagon Person of the Year (2006)
- WPCA Equine Outfit of Excellence - "GRANVIEW" - Champion Outriding Horse (2009)
- WPCA Equine Outfit of Excellence - "CRAFTY" - Champion Left Wheeler (2010)
- Calgary Stampede Equine Outfit of Excellence - "WILD" - Champion Right Leader (2016)
- Calgary Stampede Equine Outfit of Excellence - "ROBERT" - Champion Outriding Horse (2017)

== Personal life ==
Harden is a scout for the Calgary Hitmen of the Western Hockey League and was once the scout for the Kootenay Ice of the Western Hockey League. He is a third generation chuckwagon driver, whose grandfather Leroy Harden and father Robert Harden drove wagons for many years.
