= Joseph Harden =

African-American missionary (1824–1864)

Joseph Harden (1824–1864) was an African American missionary whose proselytizing activity was in West Africa. Harden founded the First Baptist Church in Lagos and laid the foundation of the Baptist Academy in Lagos.

== Life ==
Harden was born free to parents who had known slavery, his father was of the Methodist Faith and Harden was baptized as a Methodist before switching to the Southern Baptist Church. Upon his switch, he became a member of the Saratoga Street African Baptist Church in Baltimore.

When the Southern Baptist Convention established a Foreign Mission Board to sponsor missionary activities, a mission station was to be established in China and in West Africa, the presence of ex-slaves in Liberia was thought by the Baptist to be a suitable location to convert Africans to Christianity. Harden, a member of a Baptist church in Maryland was nominated by the mission board to relocate to Liberia for missionary duties. Harden's initial experience with mission life in West Africa was demoralizing, his first wife and child died within a year of reaching the shores of Liberia. He took a second wife, a Liberian lady who died at childbirth. But, he was ready to endure to succeed in his endeavour. In Liberia, he befriended John Day, who was in charge of the Baptist Mission, and also spent time with a young American preacher, William Clark who was on his way to Ijaye and James Churchill Vaughan who later played a role in the development of the church in Lagos.

Harden transferred services to Lagos in 1855, by then two Southern Baptist missionaries preceded his arrival, Thomas Bowen and William H. Clark were in Oyo, trying to make inroads with the people of Ijaye. But it was in Lagos that Harden established a mission station and house built from bamboo and made use of an interpreter to preach his message. The station was the first in Lagos, Harden later opened a tutoring class which became Baptist Academy. He married Sarah Marsh, a saro who later played an important role in the sustenance of the Baptist church in Lagos.
