= Hardens =

Historic house in Virginia, United States

- U.S. National Register of Historic Places
- Virginia Landmarks Register
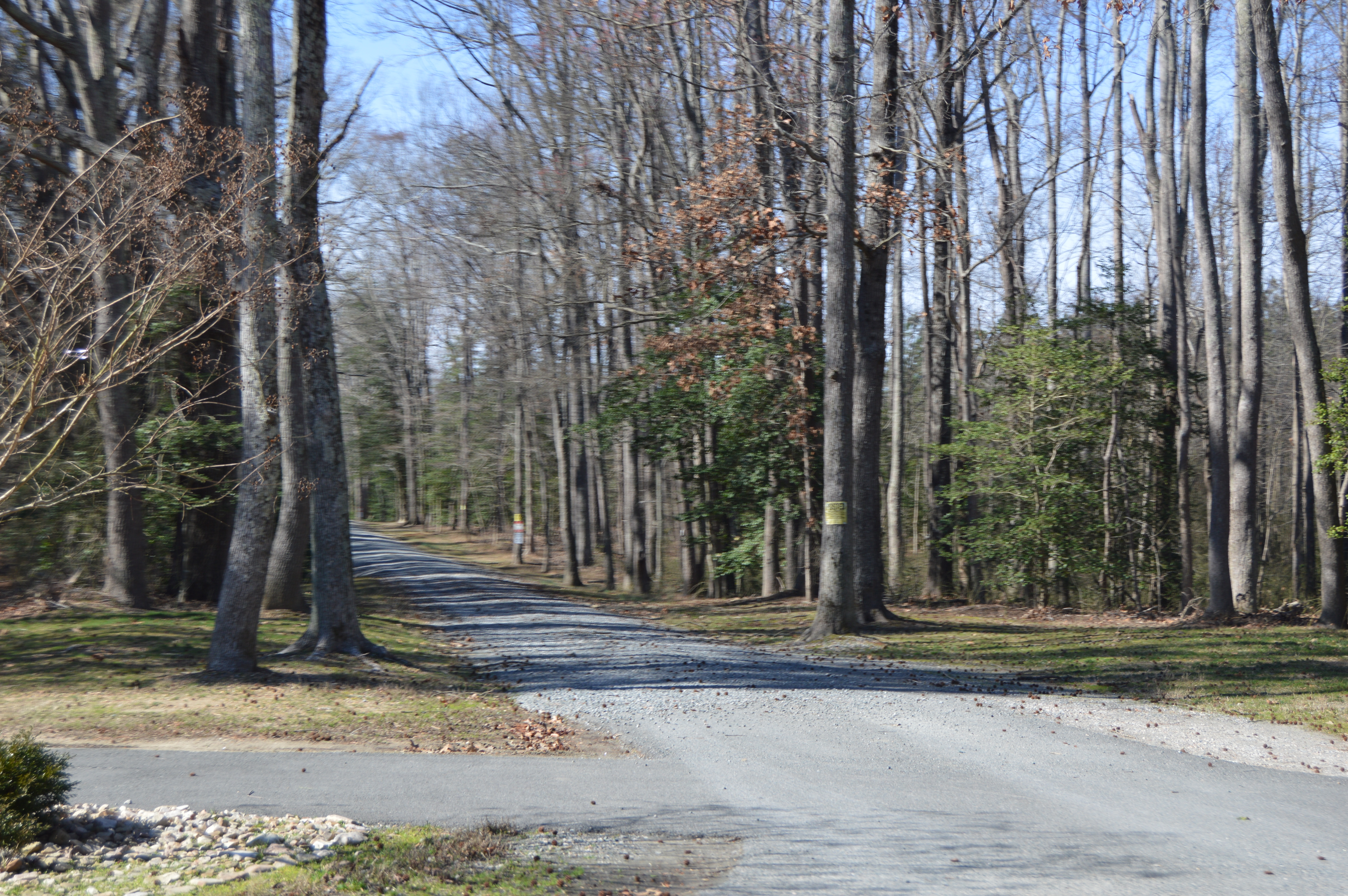
- Property entrance

- Location within Virginia Location within the United States
- Location: West of Lamptie Hill on State Route 5
- Coordinates: 37°22′16″N 77°14′12″W
- Area: 554 acres (224 ha)
- Built: c. 1845-1846, 1849
- NRHP reference No.: 83003266
- VLR No.: 018-0045

Significant dates
- Added to NRHP: February 10, 1983
- Designated VLR: December 15, 1981

Hardens is a historic home and farm located near Lamptie Hill, Charles City County, Virginia. The main house is a 1 1/2-story, single-pile house, a typical example of mid-19th century Virginia vernacular architecture. The original section was built about 1845–1846, and expanded about 1849. It has a gable roof with dormers and features a one-story porch with turned posts and a flat roof. Contributing buildings and structures include a former kitchen, two-story tenant house, and a variety of barns and sheds. During the American Civil War Hardens was used as a Union communications station and was later a camp for General Philip Sheridan.

It was added to the National Register of Historic Places in 1983.
