= Harden Askenasy =

Romanian-Israeli Jewish professor of neurosurgery

Harden Askenasy (Hebrew: הארדן אסקנסי; 3 July 1908 - 19 July 1975) was a Romanian-Israeli Jewish scientist and professor of neurosurgery, notable for pioneering neurosurgery in Israel and much of the Middle East. He was responsible for making the Israel Neurosurgical Society a member of both the European Neurosurgical Association and the World Federation of Neurosurgical Societies. During his career, he served as a neurosurgeon, researcher, and professor in many areas of science and medicine including anatomy and neurosurgery. His scientific contributions laid the foundation for old and new generations of neurosurgical students who achieved high honors at the top of their profession, both in Israel and abroad.

== Biography ==
Harden M. Askenasy was born in Bucharest, Romania to Mihail Askenasy, a merchant, and Buca née Leibovici, an art teacher. He had a younger brother named Henry. He studied at a Christian primary school. Later, he was sent to the Realgymnasium Der Evangelischen Gemeide Zu Bukarest, from which he graduated in 1926. After graduation, Askenasy continued his education at the University of Montpellier in France. After Montpellier, he attended the University of Paris, where he received his Diplome de Docteur de Medicine in 1934.

== Medical training ==
From 1933 to 1937, Askenasy did his neurosurgical residency at the Hospital de la Pitie. He worked under the direction of Professor Clovis Vincent, a legendary French neurosurgeon. He also worked with many other leading scientists and physicians during his residency,among them Gerard Guiot, P. Puech, Jean Talairach, Marcel David, and Count Thierry De Martel.

The field of neurosurgery began to develop during Askenasy's tenure in France. During his residency, Askenasy discovered the use of sulphur amides followed by cystic lesion puncture to treat brain abscesses. This therapy avoided the need for early surgical procedure to remove infected areas of the brain. It was considered the first minimally invasive surgical therapy technique to treat brain abscesses, replacing the need for craniotomies to treat acute cerebrates. Sulfur amides revolutionized brain abscess therapy, and their use along with modern antibiotics is still being practiced today. Along with Professor Clovis Vincent and Marcel David, Askenasy described the association of brain tumors with psychiatric disease, and the associations of the vascular brain stem lesion with ataxia and astereognosis.

In 1937 he continued his studies at Johns Hopkins Hospital in Baltimore, USA, with the American neurosurgeon Walter Dandy. The following year, Askenasy travelled around the United States and Canada, visiting and working at some of the leading centers for neurosurgery. He also met Harvey Cushing, a pioneer of American neurosurgery. During his tenure, Askenasy completed additional neurosurgical training as a fellow in the US and Canada at Lahey Clinic with Gilbert Horrax (Boston, MA), Mayo Clinic with Alfred Adson (Rochester, MN), University of Illinois at Chicago with Paul Bucy (Chicago, IL), University of Chicago with Percival Bailey (Chicago, IL), McGill University with Wilder Penfield (Montreal, Quebec, Canada), University of Michigan with Max M. Peet (Ann Arbor, MI), and the University of Pennsylvania with Charles Frazier (Philadelphia, PA). Under Walter Dandy, Askenasy learned trigeminal nerve vascular decompression of the cranial nerve entry zone. It was after his visit with Charles Frazier that he became convinced that the resection of the Gasserian Ganglion was a better technique than vascular decompression.

== Professional career ==
In 1939, Askenasy arrived in Romania and took a position as a neurosurgeon at the Jewish Hospital in Bucharest. As a Jew during World War II, he suffered from the Anti-Semitism that was widespread at the time. Jews were dismissed from their jobs or not hired because of their Judaism. There were also beatings and public hangings of Jews. In 1940, Askenasy became a professor of Anatomy and taught at the College for Jewish Students in Bucharest, but was soon deported to Transnistria on the Ukrainian border together with hundreds of thousands of Romanian Jews who died there of disease and hunger. In the camp, Askenasy was forced to clean the filthy latrines.

In 1943 he returned to the Neurological Department at the Hospital of the Red Cross in Bucharest where neurologists were badly needed. In 1946, he returned to his academic endeavors but decided to immigrate to Palestine, the historic land of the Jewish people. When Jewish citizens were selected to leave Romania on Christmas Eve, his name and that of his wife were not on the list, apparently due to the importatnce of his medical expertise. However, after a meeting with the interior minister of Romania, Teohari Giorgescu, he and his family were granted permission to leave.

Askenasy departed Bucharest, Romania by boat, the “Pan-York”, bringing his neurosurgical instruments with him. After departing from Bulgaria, the English Royal Navy diverted the ship to a refugee camp in Famagusta, Cyprus on January 2, 1948. With the help of the Haganah, he and his wife were provided with English immigration certificates as Jacob and Rivka Schwartz, which enabled them to leave the camp. With false papers arranged through Mossad Le’Aliya Bet, they sailed to Haifa aboard the S.S. Kedma, landing on February 19, 1948.

Askenasy arrived two years after the departure of the only neurosurgeon in the country at the time, Dr. Henry Wigderson (Montefiore Medical Center, New York). He was recruited to work at Beilinson Hospital by Dr. Chaim Sheba. For the next 27 years, he served as a neurosurgeon for the Kupat Holim Clalit health organization, treating patients with a range of brain and spinal cord disorders.

In 1950 he became head of the Department of Neurosurgery at Beilinson Hospital and began teaching. In 1959, he became a professor of neurosurgery at the Hebrew University of Jerusalem and in 1963, a professor of neurosurgery at Tel Aviv University.

== Personal life ==
Askenasy married Nina née Sussmann before departing to Palestine. They remained married for 31 years until his death on July 19, 1975. They had one daughter, Karin Askenasy-Taub, who resides in Israel. Her two children are Dana Bensimon, born February 9, 1982, and Tom Harden Mihail Askenasy Taub, born September 8, 1989.

== Legacy ==
In 1962, Askenasy and Ephraim Frei from the Weizmann Institute developed a magnetic catheter (POD) for intra-arterial endovascular navigation to brain circulation. This approach was an early development for endovascular therapy and treatment of occlusion, cerebral arterial aneurysms, thrombolysis, and arterial venous malformations.

Askenasy researched the interaction between the 100 watt CO_{2} laser and brain tissue as a treatment for the removal of brain tumors, as well as the impact of low level radiation on the development of intracranial meningiomas along the scalp. It was discovered that application of low level radiation could cause epilepsy. He also played a major role in the research and development of minimally invasive therapy for brain abscesses, endovascular magnetic catheters for cerebral artery catheterization, minimally invasive Ttrans nasal esphynoidal stereotactic radioactive isotope selective implantation (Iridium, Gold, Yttrium); FL-18 Isotope for the detection of brain tumors, INDPTA (intravascular) for the detection of giant aneurysms; Stereotactic Singulectomy for intractable cancer pain; radioactive Iodine 131 Serum Albumin early detection of cerebral hydrocephalus in mielomeningocele; Sulfonamides early treatment later followed by evacuation of the brain abscess.
