= Taberg =

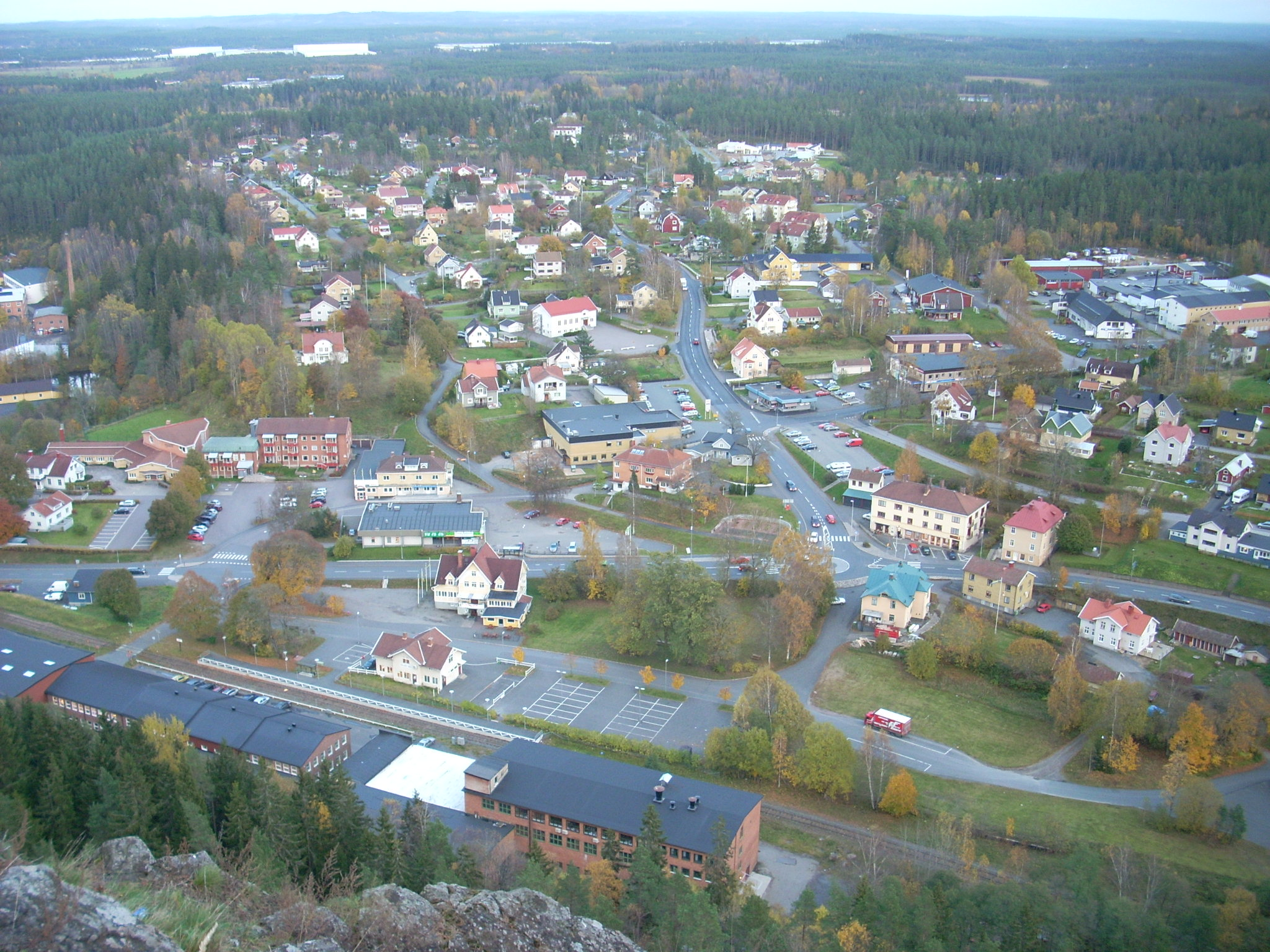
- Taberg in October 1999

- Location within Jönköping Location within Sweden
- Coordinates: 57°41′N 14°05′E
- Country: Sweden
- Province: Småland
- County: Jönköping County
- Municipality: Jönköping Municipality

Area
  - Total: 3.49 km^{2} (1.35 sq mi)

Population (31 December 2010)
  - Total: 4,392
  - Density: 1,257/km^{2} (3,260/sq mi)
- Time zone: UTC+1 (CET)
  - Summer (DST): UTC+2 (CEST)
- Climate: Dfb

Taberg (Swedish pronunciation: [taˈbærj]) is a locality situated in Jönköping Municipality, Jönköping County, Sweden with 4,392 inhabitants in 2010.
