= McConnellsville, New York =

- Hamlet
- Location within New York Location within the United States
- Coordinates: 43°16′23″N 75°41′39″W
- Country: United States
- State: New York
- County: Oneida
- Elevation: 479 ft (146 m)
- Time zone: UTC-5 (Eastern (EST))
  - Summer (DST): UTC-4 (EDT)
- ZIP code: 13401
- Area codes: 315 & 680
- GNIS feature ID: 956746

McConnellsville is a hamlet in Oneida County, New York, United States. The community is located along New York State Route 13, 5.1 miles (8.2 km) southeast of Camden. McConnellsville had a post office from August 2, 1824, until February 26, 1994; it still has its own ZIP code, 13401.
