= Hardin Township =

Hardin Township may refer to:

- Hardin Township, Faulkner County, Arkansas, in Faulkner County, Arkansas
- Hardin Township, Pike County, Illinois
- Hardin Township, Greene County, Iowa
- Hardin Township, Hardin County, Iowa
- Hardin Township, Johnson County, Iowa
- Hardin Township, Pottawattamie County, Iowa
- Hardin Township, Webster County, Iowa
- Hardin Township, Clinton County, Missouri
