= Blossvale, New York =

- Hamlet
- Location within New York Location within the United States
- Coordinates: 43°16′47″N 75°38′37″W
- Country: United States
- State: New York
- County: Oneida
- Elevation: 420 ft (130 m)
- Time zone: UTC-5 (Eastern (EST))
  - Summer (DST): UTC-4 (EDT)
- ZIP code: 13308
- Area codes: 315 & 680
- GNIS feature ID: 944297

Blossvale is a hamlet in Oneida County, New York, United States. The community is 10.5 miles (16.9 km) west-northwest of Rome. Blossvale has a post office with ZIP code 13308, which opened on July 30, 1832.

== See also ==
- Blossvale crash of 1907
