= Camden (village), New York =

Camden, New York
- Village
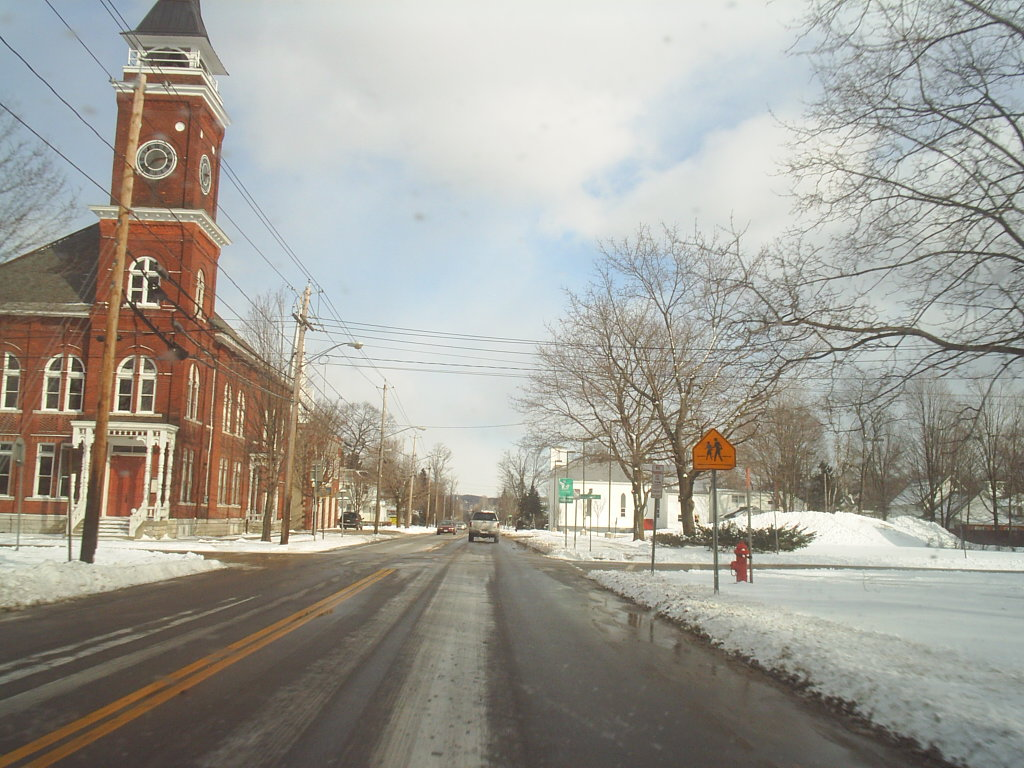
- Nickname: The Queen Village of Oneida County
- Location in Oneida County and the state of New York.
- Coordinates: 43°20′12″N 75°45′00″W
- Country: United States
- State: New York
- County: Oneida

Area
  - Total: 2.44 sq mi (6.31 km^{2})
  - Land: 2.44 sq mi (6.31 km^{2})
  - Water: 0 sq mi (0.00 km^{2})
- Elevation: 502 ft (153 m)

Population (2020)
  - Total: 2,196
  - Density: 901.4/sq mi (348.03/km^{2})
- Time zone: UTC-5 (Eastern (EST))
  - Summer (DST): UTC-4 (EDT)
- ZIP code: 13316
- Area code: 315
- FIPS code: 36-11847
- GNIS feature ID: 2391573
- Website: https://villageofcamdenny.gov/

Camden is a village in Oneida County, New York, United States. The population was 2,196 at the 2020 census.

The village of Camden is located inside the town Camden at the intersection of routes NY-13 and NY-69.

== History ==
Perspective map of Camden from 1885 with list of landmarks by L.R. Burleigh

The W. H. Dorrance House was listed on the National Register of Historic Places in 1999.

== Geography ==
According to the United States Census Bureau, the village has a total area of 2.3 square miles (5.9 km^{2}), all land.

== Demographics ==
Historical population
| Census | Pop. | Note | %± |
|---|---|---|---|
| 1840 | 700 | | — |
| 1860 | 862 | | — |
| 1870 | 1,703 | | 97.6% |
| 1880 | 1,589 | | −6.7% |
| 1890 | 1,902 | | 19.7% |
| 1900 | 2,370 | | 24.6% |
| 1910 | 2,170 | | −8.4% |
| 1920 | 1,941 | | −10.6% |
| 1930 | 1,912 | | −1.5% |
| 1940 | 2,021 | | 5.7% |
| 1950 | 2,407 | | 19.1% |
| 1960 | 2,694 | | 11.9% |
| 1970 | 2,936 | | 9.0% |
| 1980 | 2,667 | | −9.2% |
| 1990 | 2,552 | | −4.3% |
| 2000 | 2,330 | | −8.7% |
| 2010 | 2,231 | | −4.2% |
| 2020 | 2,196 | | −1.6% |
U.S. Decennial Census

As of the census of 2000, there were 2,330 people, 920 households, and 598 families residing in the village. The population density was 1,030.9 inhabitants per square mile (398.0/km^{2}). There were 1,000 housing units at an average density of 442.4 per square mile (170.8/km^{2}). The racial makeup of the village was 97.30% White, 0.39% Black or African American, 0.09% Native American, 0.73% Asian, 0.39% from other races, and 1.12% from two or more races. Hispanic or Latino of any race were 1.33% of the population.

There were 920 households, out of which 31.5% had children under the age of 18 living with them, 47.8% were married couples living together, 11.6% had a female householder with no husband present, and 34.9% were non-families. 30.9% of all households were made up of individuals, and 14.1% had someone living alone who was 65 years of age or older. The average household size was 2.45 and the average family size was 3.05.

In the village, the population was spread out, with 26.6% under the age of 18, 7.8% from 18 to 24, 25.9% from 25 to 44, 23.3% from 45 to 64, and 16.4% who were 65 years of age or older. The median age was 38 years. For every 100 females, there were 93.0 males. For every 100 females age 18 and over, there were 89.6 males.

The median income for a household in the village was $30,767, and the median income for a family was $39,063. Males had a median income of $31,736 versus $20,625 for females. The per capita income for the village was $17,303. About 10.3% of families and 13.5% of the population were below the poverty line, including 16.7% of those under age 18 and 19.1% of those age 65 or over.

== Education ==
It is in the Camden Central School District.

== Notable people ==
- Todd Gordon, former NASCAR championship-winning crew chief and radio announcer.
- Lorimer Rich, the architect who designed the Tomb of the Unknowns in Washington, D.C., born and lived in Camden.
