= Taberg, New York =

- hamlet
- Location within the state of New York
- Coordinates: 43°18′9.82″N 75°37′10.82″W
- Country: United States
- State: New York
- County: Oneida

Government

Area
  - Land: 81.22 sq mi (210.4 km^{2})
  - Water: 0.19 sq mi (0.49 km^{2})
- Elevation: 407 ft (124 m)

Population (2000)
  - Total: 3,063 (3,562 total)
  - Density: 49/sq mi (19/km^{2})
- Time zone: UTC-5 (Eastern (EST))
  - Summer (DST): UTC-4 (EDT)
- ZIP code: 13471
- Area code: 315
- FIPS code: 065-36
- GNIS feature ID: 966977

Taberg is a hamlet in the town of Annsville in Oneida County, New York, United States. Taberg is the town center of Annsville, which was originally named Taberg.

== History ==
Taberg was originally a hamlet named from an iron-mining town in Sweden called Taberg and was situated on the east branch of Fish Creek, near what is now the southeast part of Annsville. It originally contained three churches, viz., Baptist, Methodist and Presbyterian; the first town census population numbered about 350.

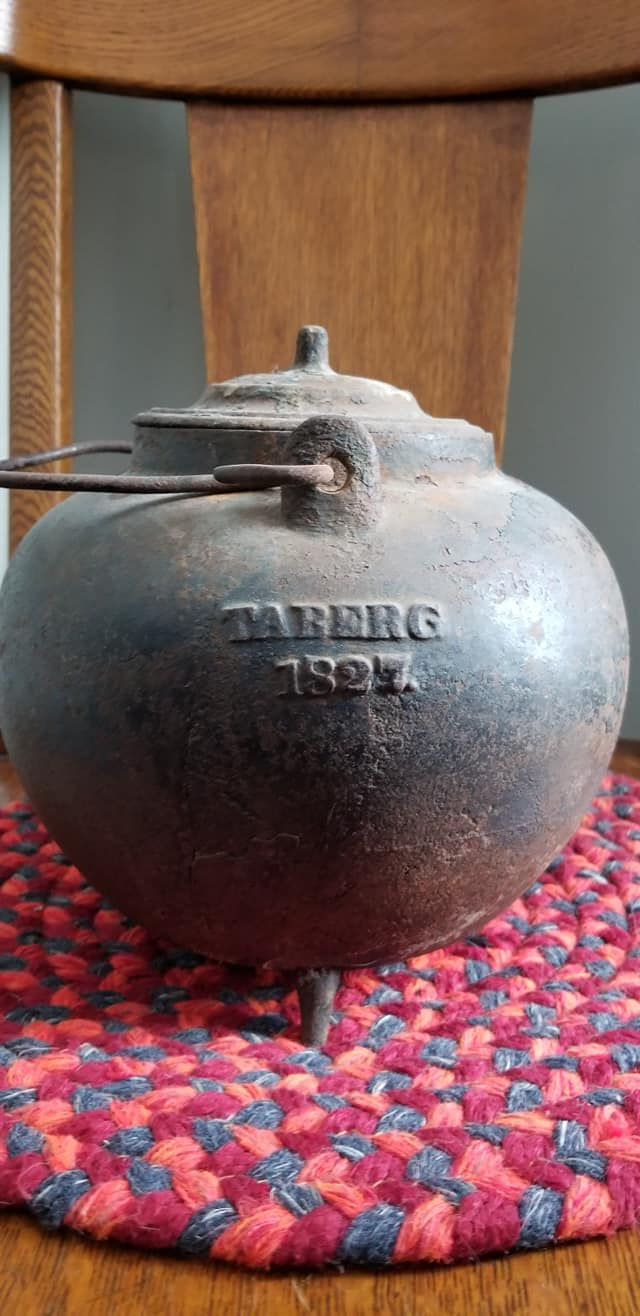
Taberg holloware tea kettle 1827

In 1809, the Oneida Iron and Glass Company commenced operations, and during the War of 1812-15, was engaged in the manufacturing of shot and shell for the United States Army. After the close of the war, the Company engaged in the manufacturing of hollow ware, until 1865, when the business was discontinued. A large tannery is now located near the site of the old furnace. One other notable place of interest is the Old Taberg Cemetery.

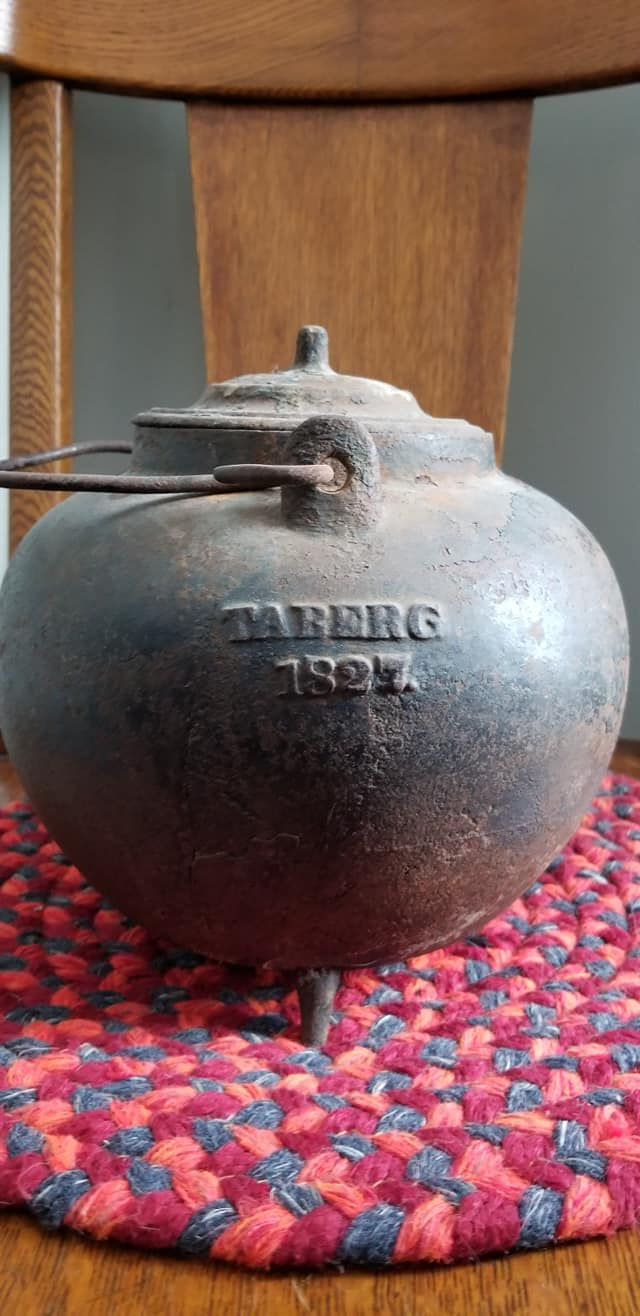

Taberg Station, on the Rome, Watertown and Ogdensburgh Railroad, 11 miles (18 km) northeast of Rome, is also a hamlet.

== Economy and Local Industry ==
Two large canning establishments in the village canned over half a million cans of corn last year, also two tin shops and stove dealers. Then they have a cheese factory, which makes in flush feed as high as thirty cheese per day, aggregating 1,920 pounds, which ranks second to none in market.

== Government ==
Taberg has no mayor and is governed by the Annsville town government. The Annsville town hall, however, is located in Taberg.
