= List of places in New York: L =

This list of current cities, towns, unincorporated communities, counties, and other recognized places in the U.S. state of New York also includes information on the number and names of counties in which the place lies, and its lower and upper zip code bounds, if applicable.

List of places in New York: A | B | C | D | E | F | G | H | I | J | K | L | M | N | O | P | Q | R | S | T | U | V | W | X | Y | Z

Name of place	Counties	Principal county	Lower zip code	Upper zip code
Lackawack	1	Ulster County		
Lackawanna	1	Erie County	14218	
Lacona	1	Oswego County	13083	
Lacy Corners	1	Tompkins County		
Ladentown	1	Rockland County	10970	
Ladleton	1	Ulster County	12725	
Lafarges Landing	1	Suffolk County		
La Fargeville	1	Jefferson County	13656	
LaFayette	1	Onondaga County	13084	
LaFayette	1	Onondaga County		
Lafayette Corners	1	Tompkins County		
Lafayetteville	1	Dutchess County	12571	
La Grange	1	Dutchess County		
Lagrange	1	Orange County		
Lagrange	1	Wyoming County	14525	
Lagrangeville	1	Dutchess County	12540	
La Guardia Airport	1	Queens County	11371	
Laidlaw	1	Cattaraugus County		
Lairdsville	1	Oneida County	13323	
Lake	1	Cattaraugus County		
Lake	1	Orange County	10990	
Lake Bluff	1	Wayne County	14590	
Lake Bonaparte	1	Lewis County	13648	
Lake Carmel	1	Putnam County	10512	
Lake Charles	1	Putnam County	12563	
Lake Clear	1	Franklin County	12945	
Lake Colby	1	Franklin County	12983	
Lake Como	1	Cayuga County	13045	
Lake Delaware	1	Delaware County	13753	
Lake Delta	1	Oneida County	13440	
Lake Desolation	1	Saratoga County	12850	
Lake Erie Beach	1	Erie County	14006	
Lake Gardens	1	Putnam County	10541	
Lake George	1	Warren County	12845	
Lake George	1	Warren County		
Lake Grove	1	Suffolk County	11755	
Lake Hill	1	Ulster County	12448	
Lake Huntington	1	Sullivan County	12752	
Lakehurst	1	Westchester County	10595	
Lake Katonah	1	Westchester County	10536	
Lake Katrine	1	Ulster County	12449	
Lake Kitchawan	1	Westchester County	10590	
Lakeland	1	Onondaga County	13209	
Lakeland	1	Suffolk County	11779	
Lake Lincolndale	1	Westchester County	10541	
Lake Lucille	1	Rockland County	10956	
Lake Luzerne	1	Warren County	12846	
Lake Luzerne	1	Warren County	12846	
Lake Mahopac	1	Putnam County	10541	
Lake Minnewaska	1	Ulster County	12561	
Lake Mohegan	1	Westchester County		
Lakemont	1	Yates County	14857	
Lake Moraine	1	Madison County	13346	
Lake Osceola	1	Westchester County	10535	
Lake Osiris Colony	1	Orange County	12586	
Lake Panamoka	1	Suffolk County	11961	
Lake Peekskill	1	Putnam County	10537	
Lake Placid	1	Essex County	12946	
Lake Placid Club	1	Essex County	12946	
Lake Pleasant	1	Hamilton County	12108	
Lake Pleasant	1	Hamilton County		
Lakeport	1	Madison County	13037	
Lake Purdy	1	Westchester County	10578	
Lake Ridge	1	Tompkins County		
Lake Ronkonkoma	1	Suffolk County	11779	
Lake Ronkonkoma Heights	1	Suffolk County	11779	
Lake Secor	1	Putnam County	10541	
Lake Shenorock	1	Westchester County		
Lakeside	1	Onondaga County		
Lakeside	1	Orange County	10930	
Lakeside	1	Orleans County		
Lakeside	1	Wayne County	14519	
Lakeside Park	1	Albany County	12212	
Lakeside Park	1	Chautauqua County		
Lakeside Park	1	Orleans County	14571	
Lakeside Park	1	Steuben County		
Lake Station	1	Orange County	10990	
Lake Success	1	Nassau County	11040	
Lake Sunnyside	1	Warren County	12845	
Lake Vanare	1	Warren County	12846	
Lake View	1	Erie County	14085	
Lakeview	1	Nassau County	11552	
Lake View Terrace	1	Cattaraugus County		
Lakeville	1	Livingston County	14480	
Lakeville Estates	1	Nassau County	11040	
Lakewood	1	Chautauqua County	14750	
Lamberton	1	Chautauqua County	14063	
Lambs Corner	1	Albany County	12083	
Lamont	1	Wyoming County	14427	
Lamont Circle	1	Cortland County	13045	
Lamson	1	Onondaga County	13135	
Lancaster	1	Erie County	14086	
Lancaster	1	Erie County		
Landia	1	Nassau County	11791	
Lane	1	Genesee County	14020	
Lanesville	1	Greene County	12450	
Langdon	1	Broome County	13795	
Langdon Corners	1	St. Lawrence County	13617	
Langford	1	Erie County	14057	
Langton Corners	1	Genesee County		
Lansing	1	Oswego County	13126	
Lansing	1	Tompkins County	14882	
Lansing	1	Tompkins County		
Lansingburgh	1	Rensselaer County	12182	
Lansing Station	1	Tompkins County		
Lansingville	1	Tompkins County		
Laona	1	Chautauqua County	14063	
Lapeer	1	Cortland County		
Laphams Mills	1	Clinton County	12972	
Lapla	1	Ulster County	12401	
Larchmont	1	Westchester County	10538	
Larchmont Gardens	1	Westchester County	10538	
Larchmont Manor	1	Westchester County	10538	
Larchmont North	1	Westchester County	10538	
La Salle	1	Niagara County	14304	
Lassellsville	1	Fulton County	13452	
Latham	1	Albany County	12110	
Lathams Corners	1	Chenango County	13843	
Lattingtown	1	Nassau County	11560	
Lattintown	1	Ulster County	12542	
Laughing Waters	1	Suffolk County	11971	
Laurel	1	Suffolk County	11948	
Laurel Hill	1	Queens County		
Laurel Hollow	1	Nassau County	11791	
Laurelton	1	Monroe County	14617	
Laurelton	1	Queens County	11431	
Laurens	1	Otsego County	13796	
Laurens	1	Otsego County		
Lava	1	Sullivan County	12764	
Lawrence	1	Nassau County	11559	
Lawrence	1	St. Lawrence County		
Lawrence Beach	1	Nassau County	11559	
Lawrence Farms	1	Westchester County	10514	
Lawrence Park	1	Westchester County		
Lawrenceville	1	Greene County		
Lawrenceville	1	St. Lawrence County	12949	
Lawrenceville	1	Steuben County		
Lawrenceville	1	Ulster County	12472	
Lawtons	1	Erie County	14091	
Lawyersville	1	Schoharie County	12113	
Lebanon	1	Madison County	13085	
Lebanon	1	Madison County		
Lebanon	1	Orange County		
Lebanon Center	1	Madison County	13332	
Lebanon Springs	1	Columbia County	12114	
Ledgewood Park	1	Greene County	12463	
Ledyard	1	Cayuga County	13081	
Ledyard	1	Cayuga County		
Lee	1	Oneida County	13440	
Lee	1	Oneida County		
Lee	1	Washington County		
Lee Center	1	Oneida County	13363	
Leeds	1	Greene County	12451	
Leeds-Elting Park	1	Greene County		
Leedsville	1	Dutchess County	12501	
Leeside	1	Putnam County	10512	
Leesville	1	Schoharie County	13459	
Lefever Falls	1	Ulster County		
Lefferts	1	Kings County	11225	
Lefferts Mill	1	Suffolk County		
Lefrak City	1	Queens County		
Lehigh	1	Genesee County		
Leibhardt	1	Ulster County	12404	
Leicester	1	Livingston County	14481	
Leicester	1	Livingston County		
Leisher Mill	1	Lewis County		
Lena	1	Otsego County		
Lenox	1	Madison County	13032	
Lenox	1	Madison County		
Lenox Basin	1	Madison County		
Lenox Furnace	1	Madison County	13032	
Lenox Hill	1	New York County	10021	
Lenox Park	1	Ontario County	14456	
Lent Hill	1	Steuben County		
Lentsville	1	Otsego County		
Leon	1	Cattaraugus County	14751	
Leon	1	Cattaraugus County		
Leonardsville	1	Madison County	13364	
Leonta	1	Delaware County	13775	
Leptondale	1	Orange County		
Le Ray	1	Jefferson County		
Le Roy	1	Genesee County	14482	
Le Roy	1	Genesee County		
Le Roy Island	1	Wayne County	14590	
Lester	1	Broome County		
Levanna	1	Cayuga County	13026	
Levant	1	Chautauqua County	14733	
Levittown	1	Nassau County	11756	
Lew Beach	1	Sullivan County	12753	
Lewis	1	Essex County	12950	
Lewis	1	Lewis County		
Lewis	1	Lewis County		
Lewisboro	1	Westchester County	10590	
Lewisboro	1	Westchester County		
Lewis Corners	1	Oswego County		
Lewiston	1	Niagara County	14092	
Lewiston	1	Niagara County		
Lewiston Heights	1	Niagara County	14092	
Lewiston Manor	1	Onondaga County	13224	
Lexington	1	Greene County	12452	
Lexington	1	Greene County		
Leyden	1	Lewis County		
Liberty	1	Sullivan County	12754	
Liberty	1	Sullivan County		
Liberty Gardens	1	Oneida County	13440	
Libertypole	1	Livingston County	14437	
Libertyville	1	Ulster County		
Lick Springs	1	Washington County		
Lidell Corners	1	Otsego County		
Lido Beach	1	Nassau County	11561	
Liebhardt	1	Ulster County		
Lighthouse Beach	1	Monroe County		
Lila	1	Steuben County		
Lillian Wald	1	New York County		
Lily Dale	1	Chautauqua County	14752	
Lima	1	Livingston County	14485	
Lima	1	Livingston County		
Lime Lake	1	Cattaraugus County	14042	
Lime Lake-Machias	1	Cattaraugus County		
Limerick	1	Jefferson County	13657	
Limerock	1	Genesee County	14482	
Limestone	1	Cattaraugus County	14753	
Limestreet	1	Greene County	12414	
Lincklaen	1	Chenango County	13052	
Lincklaen	1	Chenango County		
Lincklaen Center	1	Chenango County		
Lincoln	1	Madison County		
Lincoln	1	Wayne County	14502	
Lincoln	1	Westchester County		
Lincolndale	1	Westchester County	10540	
Lincoln Park	1	Erie County	14223	
Lincoln Park	1	Monroe County		
Lincoln Park	1	Ulster County	12401	
Lincolnton	1	New York County	10037	
Lincolnville	1	Rensselaer County		
Lindbergh Court	1	Albany County	12212	
Lindbergh Lawns	1	Onondaga County		
Linden	1	Genesee County	14054	
Linden Acres	1	Dutchess County	12571	
Linden Hill	1	Queens County	11354	
Lindenhurst	1	Suffolk County	11757	
Linden-Park	1	Richmond County		
Lindley	1	Steuben County	14858	
Lindley	1	Steuben County		
Lindsley Corners	1	Fulton County		
Linlithgo	1	Columbia County	12526	
Linlithgo Mills	1	Columbia County		
Linoleumville	1	Richmond County		
Linwood	1	Livingston County	14525	
Lisbon	1	St. Lawrence County	13658	
Lisbon	1	St. Lawrence County		
Lisha Kill	1	Albany County		
Lisle	1	Broome County	13797	
Lisle	1	Broome County		
Litchfield	1	Herkimer County		
Litchfield	1	Tioga County		
Lithgow	1	Dutchess County	12545	
Little America	1	Oswego County	13144	
Little Bow	1	St. Lawrence County	13642	
Little Britain	1	Orange County	12575	
Little Canada	1	Genesee County	14054	
Little Falls	1	Dutchess County	12590	
Little Falls	1	Herkimer County	13365	
Little Falls	1	Herkimer County		
Little France	1	Oswego County	13036	
Little Genesee	1	Allegany County	14754	
Little Hollow	1	Cayuga County		
Little Neck	1	Queens County	11362	
Little Plains	1	Suffolk County	11731	
Little Rapids	1	Hamilton County		
Littlerest	1	Dutchess County		
Little Rock City	1	Cattaraugus County		
Little Utica	1	Onondaga County	13135	
Little Valley	1	Cattaraugus County	14755	
Little Valley	1	Cattaraugus County		
Littleville	1	Livingston County		
Littleville	1	Ontario County	14424	
Little York	1	Cortland County	13087	
Little York	1	Orange County	10969	
Little York	1	Schoharie County		
Liverpool	1	Onondaga County	13088	
Livingston	1	Columbia County	12541	
Livingston	1	Columbia County		
Livingston	1	Kings County	11217	
Livingston Manor	1	Sullivan County	12758	
Livingstonville	1	Schoharie County	12122	
Livonia	1	Livingston County	14487	
Livonia	1	Livingston County		
Livonia Center	1	Livingston County	14488	
Lloyd	1	Ulster County	12528	
Lloyd	1	Ulster County		
Lloyd Harbor	1	Suffolk County	11743	
Lloydsville	1	Otsego County		
Lochada Lake	1	Sullivan County	12719	
Loch Muller	1	Essex County	12857	
Loch Sheldrake	1	Sullivan County	12759	
Lock Berlin	1	Wayne County	14489	
Locke	1	Cayuga County	13092	
Locke	1	Cayuga County		
Lockpit	1	Wayne County		
Lockport	1	Niagara County	14094	
Lockport	1	Niagara County		
Lockport Air Force Station	1	Niagara County	14094	
Lockport Junction	1	Niagara County		
Locksley Park	1	Erie County	14075	
Lockwood	1	Tioga County	14859	
Locust Grove	1	Lewis County	13309	
Locust Grove	1	Nassau County	11791	
Locust Manor	1	Queens County	11431	
Locust Point	1	Bronx County	10465	
Locust Valley	1	Nassau County	11560	
Locustwood	1	Nassau County	11003	
Lodi	1	Seneca County	14860	
Lodi	1	Seneca County		
Lodi Center	1	Seneca County	14860	
Lodi Point	1	Seneca County	14860	
Logan	1	Schuyler County	14818	
Logtown	1	Orange County	12771	
Lomala	1	Dutchess County		
Lombard	1	Chautauqua County	14775	
Lomond Shore	1	Orleans County	14476	
Lomontville	1	Ulster County	12401	
London Terrace	1	New York County	10011	
Lonelyville	1	Suffolk County	11706	
Long Beach	1	Nassau County	11561	
Long Branch	1	Onondaga County	13088	
Long Branch Manor	1	Onondaga County	13088	
Long Bridge	1	Onondaga County	13153	
Long Eddy	1	Sullivan County	12760	
Long Flat	1	Delaware County		
Long Island City	1	Queens County	11101	99
Long Island MacArthur Airport	1	Suffolk County	11716	
Long Lake	1	Hamilton County	12847	
Long Lake	1	Hamilton County		
Long Point Cove	1	Livingston County		
Long View	1	Chautauqua County	14710	
Longwood	1	Bronx County	10459	
Longwood	1	Genesee County		
Loomis	1	Delaware County		
Loomis	1	Sullivan County	12754	
Loomises	1	Chautauqua County	14710	
Loomis Hill	1	Onondaga County		
Loon Lake	1	Franklin County	12968	
Loon Lake Junction	1	Franklin County	12968	
Lords Corners	1	Onondaga County		
Lordville	1	Delaware County	13783	
Lorenz Park	1	Columbia County	12534	
Loring Crossing	1	Cortland County		
Lorings	1	Cortland County	13045	
Lorraine	1	Jefferson County	13659	
Lorraine	1	Jefferson County		
Lost Valley	1	Montgomery County	12010	
Lost Village	1	St. Lawrence County		
Lotville	1	Fulton County		
Loudonville	1	Albany County	12211	
Louisville	1	St. Lawrence County	13662	
Louisville	1	St. Lawrence County		
Lounsberry	1	Tioga County	13812	
Loveland	1	Erie County		
Lowell	1	Oneida County		
Lower Beechwood	1	Sullivan County		
Lower Chateaugay Lake	1	Franklin County	12920	
Lower Cincinnatus	1	Cortland County	13040	
Lower Corners	1	Schenectady County		
Lower Genegantslet Corner	1	Chenango County	13778	
Lower Melville	1	Suffolk County		
Lower Oswegatchie	1	St. Lawrence County	13670	
Lowerre	1	Westchester County		
Lower Rotterdam	1	Schenectady County	12306	
Lower Rotterdam Junction	1	Schenectady County		
Lower South Bay	1	Onondaga County	13041	
Low Hampton	1	Washington County	12887	
Lowman	1	Chemung County	14861	
Lowville	1	Lewis County	13367	
Lowville	1	Lewis County		
Luce Landing	1	Suffolk County		
Ludingtonville	1	Putnam County	12531	
Ludlow	1	Westchester County		
Ludlowville	1	Tompkins County	14882	
Ludlowville	1	Tompkins County		
Lumberland	1	Sullivan County		
Lummisville	1	Wayne County		
Luna Park	1	Kings County	11224	
Luther	1	Rensselaer County	12061	
Lutheranville	1	Schoharie County	12064	
Luzerne	1	Delaware County		
Lycoming	1	Oswego County	13093	
Lyell	1	Monroe County	14606	
Lykers	1	Montgomery County	12166	
Lyme	1	Jefferson County	13622	
Lynbrook	1	Nassau County	11563	
Lynch Tract	1	Oneida County		
Lyncourt	1	Onondaga County	13208	
Lyndon	1	Cattaraugus County		
Lyndon	1	Onondaga County	13066	
Lyndonville	1	Orleans County	14098	
Lynelle Meadows	1	Onondaga County	13088	
Lynwood Estates	1	Albany County	12303	
Lyon Mountain	1	Clinton County	12952	
Lyons	1	Wayne County	14489	
Lyons	1	Wayne County		
Lyons Corners	1	Allegany County		
Lyonsdale	1	Lewis County	13368	
Lyonsdale	1	Lewis County		
Lyons Falls	1	Lewis County	13368	
Lyonsville	1	Ulster County	12404	
Lysander	1	Onondaga County	13094	
Lysander	1	Onondaga County		
Lysander New Community	1	Onondaga County		
