= List of places in New York: V =

This list of current cities, towns, unincorporated communities, counties, and other recognized places in the U.S. state of New York also includes information on the number and names of counties in which the place lies, and its lower and upper zip code bounds, if applicable.

List of places in New York: A | B | C | D | E | F | G | H | I | J | K | L | M | N | O | P | Q | R | S | T | U | V | W | X | Y | Z

Name of place	Counties	Principal county	Lower zip code	Upper zip code
Vail Mills	1	Fulton County	12025	
Vails Gate	1	Orange County	12584	
Vails Gate Junction	1	Orange County	12584	
Vail's Grove	1	Putnam County	10509	
Valatie	1	Columbia County	12184	
Valatie Colony	1	Columbia County		
Valcour	1	Clinton County	12972	
Valentines Beach	1	Onondaga County		
Valhalla	1	Westchester County	10595	
Valley	1	Nassau County		
Valley Brook	1	Montgomery County		
Valley Cottage	1	Rockland County	10989	
Valley Falls	1	Rensselaer County	12185	
Valley Mills	1	Madison County	13409	
Valley Pond Estates	1	Westchester County	10536	
Valley Stream	1	Nassau County	11580	82
Valley View	1	Yates County		
Vallonia Springs	1	Broome County	13813	
Valois	1	Schuyler County	14888	
Van Allen Park	1	Rensselaer County	12144	
Van Brunt	1	Kings County	11215	
Van Buren	1	Onondaga County	13027	
Van Buren	1	Onondaga County		
Van Buren Bay	1	Chautauqua County	14048	
Van Buren Point	1	Chautauqua County	14166	
Van Burenville	1	Orange County	10940	
Van Cortlandt	1	Bronx County		
Van Cortlandtville	1	Westchester County	10566	
Van Cott	1	Bronx County	10467	
Vandalia	1	Cattaraugus County	14706	
Van Del	1	Erie County	14217	
Vanderbilt Mansion National Historic Site	1	Dutchess County	12538	
Vanderveer	1	Kings County	11210	
Vanderveer Sta.	1	Kings County	11210	
Van Deusenville	1	Montgomery County	13317	
Van Etten	1	Chemung County	14889	
Van Etten	1	Chemung County		
Van Etten Junction	1	Chemung County		
Van Fleet	1	Steuben County	16920	
Van Hornesville	1	Herkimer County	13475	
Van Keuren	1	Orange County		
Van Keurens	1	Dutchess County	12603	
Van Nest	1	Bronx County	10462	
Van Vleet	1	Steuben County		
Varick	1	Seneca County		
Varna	1	Tompkins County	14850	
Varysburg	1	Wyoming County	14167	
Vaughns Corners	1	Washington County	12839	
Vega	1	Delaware County	12445	
Venice	1	Cayuga County	13147	
Venice	1	Cayuga County		
Venice Center	1	Cayuga County	13147	
Verbank	1	Dutchess County	12585	
Verbank Village	1	Dutchess County	12585	
Verdoy	1	Albany County	12110	
Vermilion	1	Oswego County	13114	
Vermontville	1	Franklin County	12989	
Vernal	1	Wyoming County	14011	
Vernon	1	Oneida County	13476	
Vernon	1	Oneida County		
Vernon Center	1	Oneida County	13477	
Vernon Park	1	Westchester County		
Vernon Valley	1	Suffolk County	11731	
Verona	1	Oneida County	13478	
Verona	1	Oneida County		
Verona Beach	1	Oneida County	13162	
Verona Mills	1	Oneida County	13440	
Verona Station	1	Oneida County		
Verplanck	1	Westchester County	10596	
Versailles	1	Cattaraugus County	14168	
Vesper	1	Onondaga County	13159	
Vestal	1	Broome County	13850	
Vestal	1	Broome County		
Vestal Center	1	Broome County	13850	
Vestal Corner	1	Broome County		
Vestal Gardens	1	Broome County	13850	
Vestal-Twin Orchards	1	Broome County	13850	
Veteran	1	Chemung County		
Veteran	1	Ulster County	12477	
Veterans Administration	1	Genesee County	14020	
Veterans Administration	1	Steuben County	14810	
Veterans Administration Facility	1	Genesee County	14020	
Veterans Administration Hospital	1	Erie County	14215	
Veterans Hospital	1	Onondaga County	13210	
Victor	1	Ontario County	14564	
Victor	1	Ontario County		
Victoria	1	Chautauqua County	14710	
Victory	1	Cayuga County	13033	
Victory	1	Cayuga County		
Victory	1	Saratoga County	12884	
Victory Heights	1	Chemung County	14903	
Victory Mills	1	Saratoga County	12884	
Victory Park	1	Westchester County		
Vienna	1	Oneida County	13308	
Vienna	1	Oneida County		
Viewmonte	1	Columbia County	12526	
Village	1	New York County	10014	
Village Green	1	Onondaga County		
Village of the Branch	1	Suffolk County	11787	
Villenova	1	Chautauqua County		
Vincent	1	Ontario County	14424	
Vine Valley	1	Yates County	14507	
Vineyard	1	Chautauqua County		
Vintonton	1	Schoharie County	12187	
Viola	1	Rockland County	10952	
Virgil	1	Cortland County	13045	
Virgil	1	Cortland County		
Vischer Ferry	1	Saratoga County	12148	
Vista	1	Westchester County	06840	
Voak	1	Yates County	14527	
Vollentine	1	Cattaraugus County		
Volney	1	Oswego County	13069	
Volney	1	Oswego County		
Volusia	1	Chautauqua County	14787	
Voorheesville	1	Albany County	12186	
Vorea	1	Oswego County		
Vosburg	1	Allegany County	14715	
Vukote	1	Chautauqua County	14710	
