= Tripp Pinnacle =

Mountain in New York, United States

- Location within New York Location within the United States

Highest point
- Elevation: 1,063 feet (324 m)
- Coordinates: 43°20′05″N 75°22′44″W

Geography
- Location: N of Westernville, New York, U.S.
- Topo map: USGS North Western

Tripp Pinnacle is a summit located in Central New York Region of New York located in the Town of Western in Oneida County, north of Westernville.
