= Rome Free Academy =

Public high school in Rome, New York, United States

- Coat of arms

Location
- 95 Dart Circle; Rome, New York 13441; United States; 43°12′40″N 75°24′55″W

Information
- Other name: RFA
- Type: Comprehensive public high school secondary school
- Established: 1869; 157 years ago
- School board: Board of Education
- School district: Rome City School District
- Principal: Andrew Barton
- Teaching staff: 105 (2018-2019)
- Grades: 9–12
- Gender: Co-educational
- Enrollment: 1,482 (2018-2019)
- Colors: Orange and black
- Song: RFA Alma Mater
- Athletics conference: New York State Public High School Athletic Association
- Mascot: Knight with orange plume
- Nickname: Knights
- Newspaper: The Knight Times
- Yearbook: De-O-Wain-Sta
- Budget: $27,605,638 (2019-2020)
- Feeder schools: Lyndon H. Strough
- Website: www.romecsd.org/o/rfa

Rome Free Academy (commonly abbreviated as RFA) is a four-year public high school in Rome, New York, United States. It is a part of the Rome City School District.

As it is the sole comprehensive high school in its school district, it serves as the high school for the majority of the City of Rome as well as the census-designated places of Lake Delta and Westernville.

== History ==
There was an institution called "Rome Academy" established in 1848. It was a school which took both day and boarding students which required tuition fees. Over time it evolved into RFA. The Rome Daily Sentinel stated that "the R.F.A. surely reaches back to 1848 for its roots." By 1989 the Justice Building had occupied the original Rome Academy site.

The initial portion of the previous campus was built in 1926. Subsequent additions were built.

The school moved to the former site of Griffiss Air Force Base in September 2002, having previously been located at 500 Turin St. Classes no longer used the 1926 onward building. This former site is the current location of Rome Free Academy's athletic facilities.

The 2002 campus had a cost of $45,400,000. The main school sign uses Arial bold, differing from the previous school sign.

There was a movement to preserve the original 1926 portion of the previous RFA building. A member of the board of trustees, Leonard H. Cross, proposed conducting a poll of district residents on whether the former building should be preserved.

During the 2018–2019 academic year the school enrolled 1,482 students in grades nine through twelve.

== Curriculum ==
Rome Free Academy offers a general high school education through a regular curriculum of mathematics, social studies, English, science, art, music, health, and a selected foreign language. Rome Free Academy also includes a multiple business classes.

== Extracurricular activities ==
A black history club was first created by John Cavness (died circa 1999).

== Athletics ==
Rome Free Academy's sports teams are called the Black Knights. The school colors are black and orange. Notable in history in the 2010s is the addition of a comprehensive Positive Behavior Initiatives and Support (PBIS) initiative, which includes a range of measures to help solve student behavioral problems.

The original facility for home athletic games was the ex-Oneida County Fairgrounds, beginning in 1892. RFA began using Wright Field for home games instead in 1933, then Colonel's Park in 1940, Wright Field again in 1941, and then Colonel's Park again due to vandalism of Wright Field. In 1944 the school community began the process of trying to have a permanent stadium. In 1946 the process to turn Colonel's Park into housing meant that the school could no longer use it for athletic games, and it did not have a home facility. A permanent stadium facility opened in 1950. In 1990, Mark Mende of The Rome Daily Sentinel wrote that the stadium "is in need of some upgrading and repair."

== Attendance boundary ==
The district (which is the high school attendance boundary) includes the majority of the City of Rome. It also includes portions of the following towns: Annsville, Lee, Verona, and Western. The Rome school district includes the census-designated places of Lake Delta and Westernville.

== Notable alumni ==
- Ben Baldanza, former CEO of Spirit Airlines
- Joseph H. Boardman, transportation executive
- Don Healy, NFL player
- Rob Manfred, commissioner of Major League Baseball
- Tom Myslinski, NFL player
- Spencer Parrish, Musical composer
- Steve Roser, professional baseball player
- Tim Russ, actor
- M. Woolsey Stryker, Presbyterian pastor and president of Hamilton College
- Bonnie Thunders, roller derby player
- Edyth Walker, opera singer with the Metropolitan Opera and Vienna State Opera
