= Western Town Hall =

- U.S. National Register of Historic Places
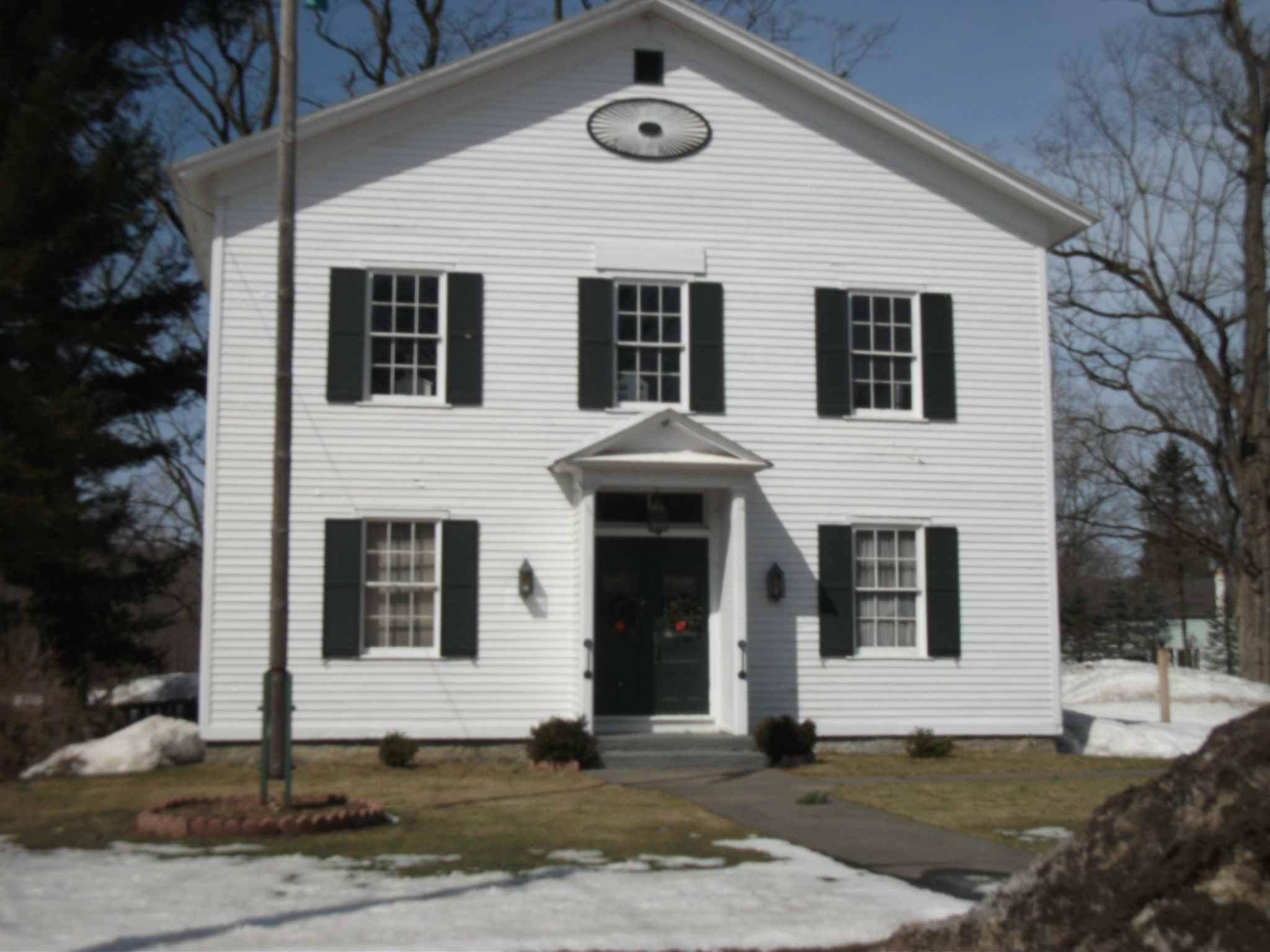
- Western Town Hall, March 2011

- Location within New York Location within the United States
- Location: Main St. at jct. with Stokes-Westernville Rd., Westernville, New York
- Coordinates: 43°18′29″N 75°22′52″W
- Area: less than one acre
- Built: 1911
- Architectural style: Classical Revival
- NRHP reference No.: 95001277
- Added to NRHP: November 7, 1995

Western Town Hall, also known as Liberty Hall, is a historic town hall building located at Westernville in Oneida County, New York. It was built in 1911 and is a two-story, gable roofed timber frame structure. It was constructed from dismantled components of the ca. 1850 Empire Hotel in Delta. It was rebuilt as "Liberty Hall," a social gathering hall, and named in honor of General William Floyd. The second floor has an auditorium. It has been used as the town hall since 1962.

It was listed on the National Register of Historic Places in 1995.
