= Buck Hill (Oneida County, New York) =

Mountain in New York, United States

- Location within New York Location within the United States

Highest point
- Elevation: 1,398 feet (426 m)
- Coordinates: 43°21′53″N 75°22′01″W

Geography
- Location: N of North Western, New York, U.S.
- Topo map: USGS North Western

Buck Hill is a summit located in Central New York Region of New York located in the Town of Western in Oneida County, north of North Western.
