= Dopp Hill =

Mountain in New York, United States

- Location within New York Location within the United States

Highest point
- Elevation: 948 feet (289 m)
- Coordinates: 43°17′33″N 75°23′04″W

Geography
- Location: S of Westernville, New York, U.S.
- Topo map: USGS North Western

Dopp Hill is a summit located in Central New York Region of New York located in the Town of Western in Oneida County, south of Westernville.
