= Lake Delta, New York =

- Hamlet and CDP
- Location within New York Location within the United States
- Coordinates: 43°17′35″N 75°28′20″W
- Country: United States
- State: New York
- County: Oneida
- Town: Lee

Area
  - Total: 4.42 sq mi (11.44 km^{2})
  - Land: 3.35 sq mi (8.67 km^{2})
  - Water: 1.07 sq mi (2.77 km^{2})
- Elevation: 594 ft (181 m)
- Time zone: UTC-5 (Eastern (EST))
  - Summer (DST): UTC-4 (EDT)
- ZIP Codes: 13440 (Rome); 13363 (Lee Center); 13303 (Ava)
- Area code: 315

Lake Delta is a hamlet (and census-designated place) located in the Town of Lee in Oneida County, New York, United States. As of the 2020 census, Lake Delta had a population of 2,757. The hamlet is named after, and located on, the western shore of the Delta Reservoir.

== Demographics ==
=== 2020 census ===
As of the 2020 census, Lake Delta had a population of 2,757. The median age was 51.4 years. 18.5% of residents were under the age of 18 and 28.2% of residents were 65 years of age or older. For every 100 females there were 99.3 males, and for every 100 females age 18 and over there were 96.0 males age 18 and over.

79.3% of residents lived in urban areas, while 20.7% lived in rural areas.

There were 1,162 households in Lake Delta, of which 24.2% had children under the age of 18 living in them. Of all households, 57.1% were married-couple households, 14.6% were households with a male householder and no spouse or partner present, and 22.5% were households with a female householder and no spouse or partner present. About 26.1% of all households were made up of individuals and 14.5% had someone living alone who was 65 years of age or older.

There were 1,255 housing units, of which 7.4% were vacant. The homeowner vacancy rate was 1.4% and the rental vacancy rate was 3.8%.

Racial composition as of the 2020 census
Race	Number	Percent
White	2,547	92.4%
Black or African American	35	1.3%
American Indian and Alaska Native	4	0.1%
Asian	19	0.7%
Native Hawaiian and Other Pacific Islander	3	0.1%
Some other race	9	0.3%
Two or more races	140	5.1%
Hispanic or Latino (of any race)	73	2.6%

== Education ==
It is in the Rome City School District, which operates Rome Free Academy.
