= Clark Hill (Oneida County, New York) =

Mountain in New York, United States

- Location within New York Location within the United States

Highest point
- Elevation: 1,585 feet (483 m)
- Coordinates: 43°22′55″N 75°20′06″W

Geography
- Location: N of North Western, New York, U.S.
- Topo map: USGS Boonville

Clark Hill is a summit located in Central New York Region of New York located in the Town of Western in Oneida County, northeast of North Western.
