= Ava Town Hall =

- U.S. National Register of Historic Places
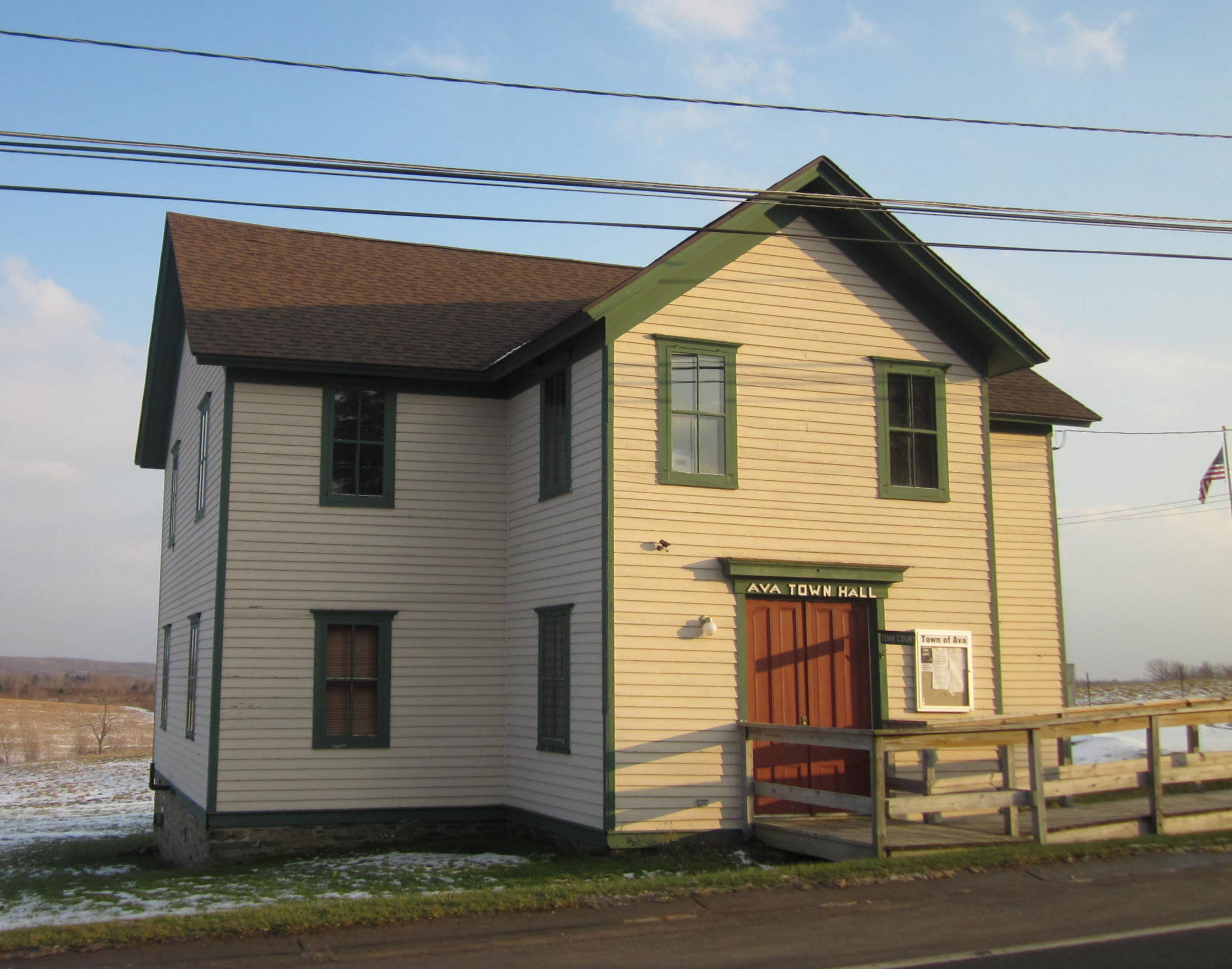
- Ava Town Hall, January 2012

- Location within New York Location within the United States
- Location: NY 26 S of jct. with West and East Ava Rd's Ava, New York
- Coordinates: 43°25′0″N 75°28′50″W
- Area: 0.3 acres (0.12 ha)
- Built: 1897
- Architect: Fey, Jacob; Shankenbery, Philip
- Architectural style: Late Victorian
- NRHP reference No.: 92000453
- Added to NRHP: May 18, 1992

Ava Town Hall is a historic town hall building located at Ava in Oneida County, New York. It was built in 1897 and is a two-story, balloon frame structure with a T-shaped floor plan, stone foundation, and intersecting gable roofs. Also on the property is a small frame privy.

It was listed on the National Register of Historic Places in 1992.
