= Meszler Hill =

Mountain in New York, United States

- Location within New York Location within the United States

Highest point
- Elevation: 1,460 feet (450 m)
- Coordinates: 43°21′17″N 75°19′47″W

Geography
- Location: N of Carmichael Hill, New York, U.S.
- Topo map: USGS North Western

Meszler Hill is a summit located in Central New York Region of New York located in the Town of Western in Oneida County, northeast of Carmichael Hill.
