= Clarks Hill =

Clarks Hill or Clark Hill can refer to some places in the United States:

- Clarks Hill, Indiana
- Clark Hill (Oneida County, New York)
- Clarks Hill, South Carolina
- Lake Strom Thurmond, formerly known as Clarks Hill Reservoir
