= Lee (hamlet), New York =

Lee, New York
- Hamlet
- Location within New York Location within the United States
- Coordinates: 43°16′42″N 75°34′18″W
- Country: United States
- State: New York
- County: Oneida
- Town: Lee
- Elevation: 505 ft (154 m)
- Time zone: UTC-5 (Eastern (EST))
  - Summer (DST): UTC-4 (EDT)
- ZIP code: 13363
- Area code: 315

Lee is a hamlet located in the Town of Lee in Oneida County, New York.
