= Webster Hill =

Mountain in New York, United States

- Location within New York Location within the United States

Highest point
- Elevation: 1,601 feet (488 m)
- Coordinates: 43°24′43″N 75°25′15″W

Geography
- Location: NE of Flint Town, New York, U.S.
- Topo map: USGS West Leyden

Webster Hill is a summit located in Central New York Region of New York, specifically in the Town of Ava in Oneida County, northeast of Flint Town.
