= Rome City School District =

Rome City School District may refer to:

- Rome City School District (Georgia)
- Rome City School District (New York)
