= Delta, New York =

Former village in New York

Coordinates: 43°17′22″N 75°26′11″W

Delta was a village located near Rome in Oneida County, New York. The former village was established in the 1800s, but was submerged to form Delta Reservoir in the early 20th century.

Once part of the town of Western, Delta was situated within the former Delta River Valley associated with the Mohawk River and the Black River Canal. For generations, Delta was a country town full of farms; shops and businesses were eventually built on the western side of the village.

== History ==
In the 1800s, a man named Israel Stark began to plan and develop the village of Delta, among others. Prosper E. Rudd moved from Connecticut to Delta and installed the early grist mill, helping modernize the village. David Smith Sr. built the first sawmill in the village, beginning a key program that helped build homes and stores and prosperity throughout the village. Families and friends soon moved into the village, increasing the population. When other villages formed around Delta in 1811, it split the people into other towns.

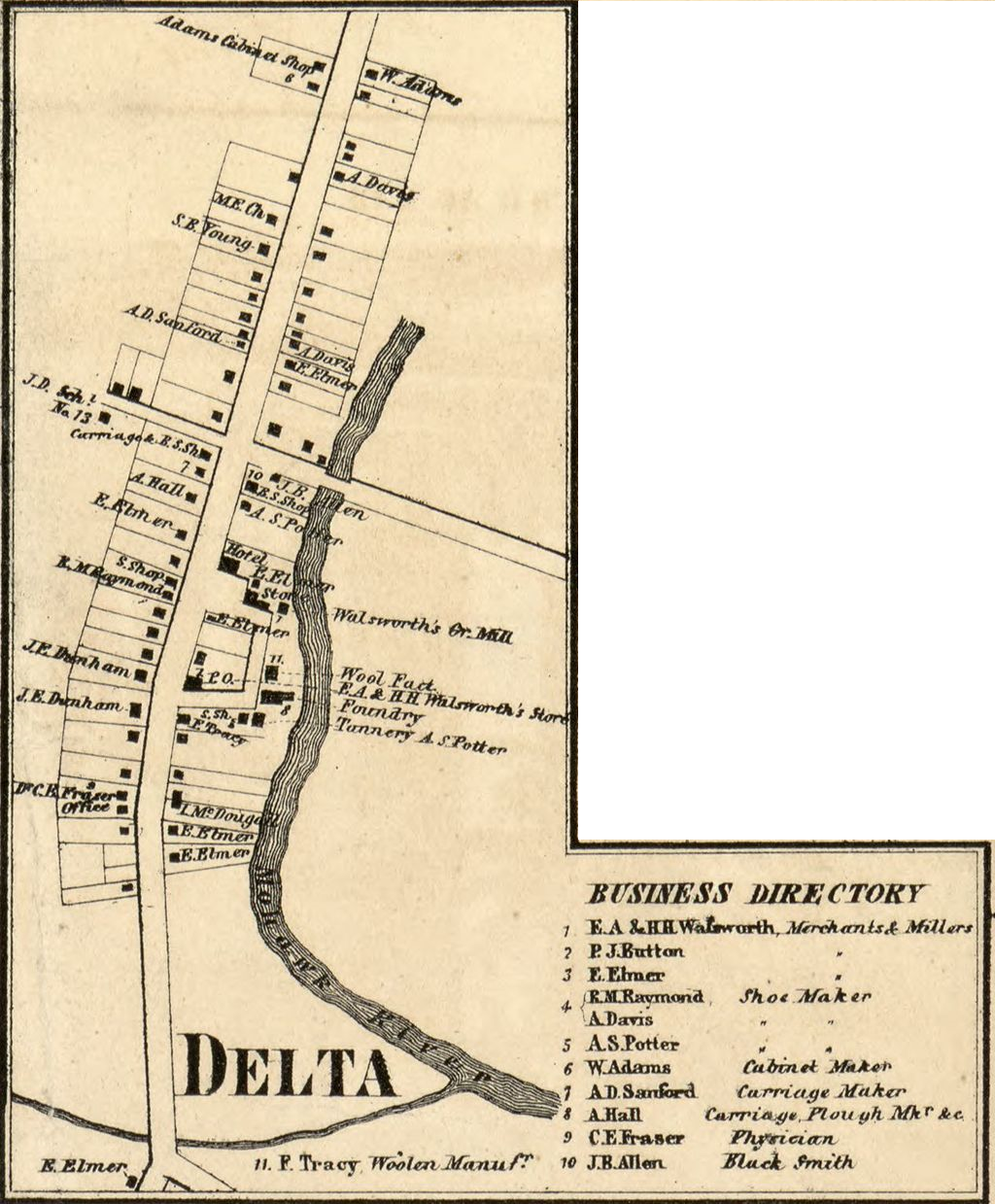
Delta Business District (Gillette's Map of Oneida County NY, 1858)

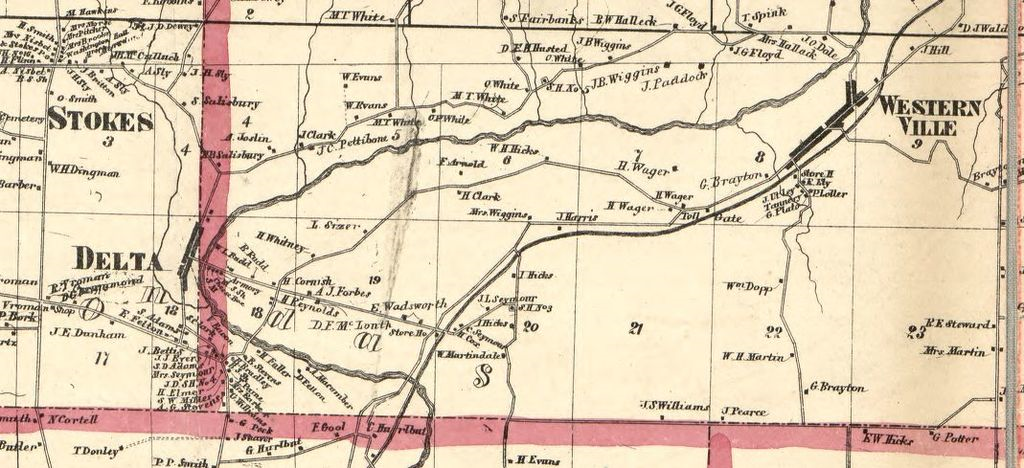
Delta to Westernville (Gillette's Map of Oneida County NY, 1858)

In 1903, New York passed an agreement to enlarge and improve the Erie Canal. The expanded canal required more water, necessitating the construction of new reservoirs. One reservoir erected near Delta submerged the village in four years.

A project for construction of the reservoir was awarded for $995,347 and included the removal of 295 buildings including 70 dwellings and two cemeteries as well as other private burial lots to be exhumed and reburied.
