= Spencer Parrish =

American composer and pianist (born 1997)

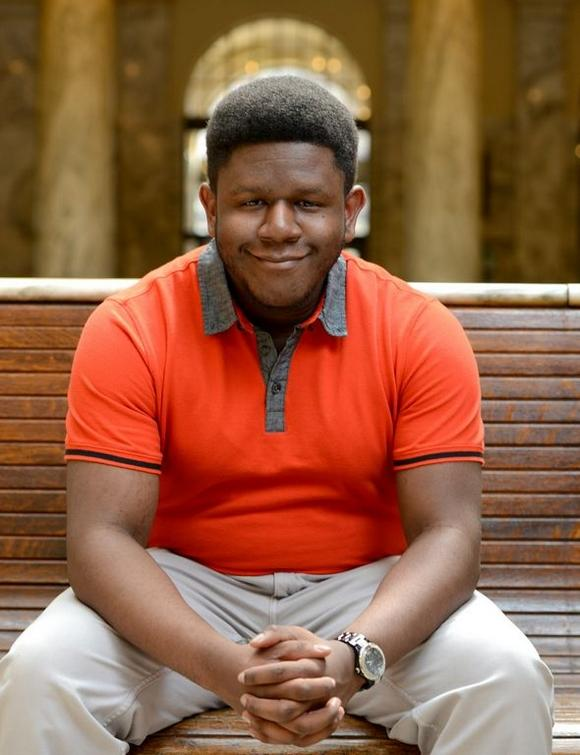
- Spencer Parrish at the Boehlert Transportation Center in Utica, NY (2016)

Background information
- Born: December 2, 1997 (age 28); Rome, New York
- Genres: R&B, gospel, jazz
- Occupations: Composer, pianist/organist, singer-songwriter, music director, music producer
- Years active: 2010–present
- Website: spencerparrish.com

Spencer Parrish (born December 2, 1997) is an American composer and pianist. Parrish garnered public attention through frequent regional performances as well as his music writing and production abilities.

== Life and career ==
=== 1997–2009: Early life and musical beginnings ===
Spencer Parrish was born in Rome, New York, the second son of Cornell & Lori Parrish and third child overall. It was in Mount Calvary Baptist Church where Parrish's family first discovered his musical potential. During a choir rehearsal one night (in which his mother was directing), Parrish demonstrated his ability to play by ear for the first time at the age of six by walking over to a nearby piano and playing one of the songs the choir was singing. "I thought everyone could play songs as they heard it, I didn't realize it was a gift," Parrish says. Parrish studied classical piano for twelve years, starting at age six. He would later become the official music director and Hammond organist for the church at age nine.

=== 2010–2012: Relate ===
Spencer Parrish's first studio album, Relate, was released on July 29, 2012, under Island Def Jam Digital Distribution.

The first single, "Persistence", became available for digital download on February 18, 2012. The album's lead single, "We Can Relate", became available for digital download on May 31, 2012.

Production for the album took place at Parrish's home over the course of a year; then-14-year-old Parrish is attributed with producing and writing the entire album, focused mainly on his social life.

=== 2012–present: High school and college ===
Parrish attended local high school Rome Free Academy for four years, graduating in 2016 as the salutatorian of his class. He went on in the fall of 2016 to attend Berklee College of Music in Boston, where he studied jazz and music education.

=== Legal Issues of Spencer Parrish ===
On April 4, 2025, Spencer Parrish, the band director at Needham High School in Needham, Massachusetts, was charged with possession of child pornography, as announced by Needham Public Schools Superintendent Daniel Gutekanst in a letter to the school community. An arrest warrant was filed in Framingham District Court on the same day, though Parrish had not been arrested at the time. Parrish, employed by Needham Public Schools since 2021, was placed on administrative leave and barred from school property and digital systems. Authorities stated there was no evidence that Needham students were involved or harmed in the case. Prior to Needham, Parrish taught at Horace Mann Elementary School in Newton Public Schools during the 2020–2021 school year, primarily virtually due to the COVID-19 pandemic, with three months of in-person instruction. Newton Superintendent Anna Nolin confirmed that searches of Parrish's accounts found no evidence of inappropriate materials involving students, only items related to his role as a music educator. The charges followed a similar case in the district, with Needham middle school teacher Michael Ciccolella charged with child pornography offenses on March 6, 2025. Gutekanst acknowledged the community's concern over the consecutive incidents and stated that counseling services would be offered to students and staff, with resources provided to parents.

== Discography ==
- Relate (2012)
- MA (2018)
- Late Night with Toothpaste (2023)
