= Don Healy =

American football player (1936–2020)

No. 60, 62, 78, 75
- Positions: Defensive tackle, guard

Personal information
- Born: August 28, 1936; Rome, New York, U.S.
- Died: April 2, 2020 (aged 83); Naples, Florida, U.S.
- Listed height: 6 ft 3 in (1.91 m)
- Listed weight: 259 lb (117 kg)

Career information
- High school: Rome Free Academy
- College: Maryland (1954–1957)
- NFL draft: 1958: 3rd round, 37th overall pick

Career history
- Chicago Bears (1958–1959); Dallas Cowboys (1960–1961); Buffalo Bills (1962)

Career NFL/AFL statistics
- Fumble recoveries: 10
- Interceptions: 1
- Sacks: 3.5
- Stats at Pro Football Reference

Michael Donald Healy (August 28, 1936 – April 2, 2020) was an American football defensive tackle in the National Football League (NFL) for the Chicago Bears and Dallas Cowboys. He also was a member of the Buffalo Bills in the American Football League (AFL). He played college football at the University of Maryland.

== Early life ==
Healy attended Rome Free Academy, where he received honorable-mention All-state honors in football. He also practiced baseball and hockey.

He accepted a football scholarship from the University of Maryland. He played as a two-way tackle and was a three-year starter.

He was a part of the 1958 College All Star team that defeated the 1957 NFL Champion Detroit Lions. His teammates included Alex Karras, Ray Nitschke and Chuck Howley. He also took part in the Senior Bowl and the East–West Shrine Game.

== Professional career ==
=== Chicago Bears ===
Healy was selected by the Chicago Bears in the third round (37th overall) of the 1958 NFL draft. He played two seasons and was a backup offensive guard.

=== Dallas Cowboys ===
He was selected by the Dallas Cowboys in the 1960 NFL expansion draft, becoming the first starter at left defensive tackle in franchise history. He holds the single-season Cowboys record for fumble recoveries (5 in 1961), established when the regular season was 14 games long. He was released on September 7, 1962.

=== Buffalo Bills ===
In 1962, he played for the Buffalo Bills of the American Football League.

== Personal life ==
He died from complications of chronic traumatic encephalopathy (CTE) on April 2, 2020, in Naples, Florida, at age 83.
