= North Western, New York =

- Hamlet
- Location within New York Location within the United States
- Coordinates: 43°20′32″N 75°21′49″W
- Country: United States
- State: New York
- County: Oneida
- Town: Western
- Elevation: 633 ft (193 m)
- Time zone: UTC-5 (Eastern (EST))
  - Summer (DST): UTC-4 (EDT)
- ZIP code: 13486
- Area codes: 315

North Western is a hamlet located in the Town of Western in Oneida County, New York. It is located on the Mohawk River northeast of Delta Reservoir.
