= Point Rock, New York =

Point Rock
- hamlet
- Location of Point Rock in New York
- Coordinates: 43°22′50″N 75°32′50″W
- Country: United States
- State: New York
- County: Oneida

Point Rock is a hamlet in the northeastern corner of the town of Lee in Oneida County, New York, United States. It only consists of a few houses and a closed bar now.
