= Tom Myslinski =

American football player and coach (born 1968)

No. 56, 60, 69, 50, 62, 67, 61
- Position: Guard

Personal information
- Born: December 7, 1968 (age 57); Rome, New York, U.S.
- Listed height: 6 ft 3 in (1.91 m)
- Listed weight: 293 lb (133 kg)

Career information
- High school: Rome (NY)
- College: Tennessee
- NFL draft: 1992: 4th round, 109th overall pick
- Expansion draft: 1995: 10th round, 19th overall pick

Career history

Playing
- Dallas Cowboys (1992)*; Cleveland Browns (1992); Washington Redskins (1992); Buffalo Bills (1993); Chicago Bears (1993–1994); Jacksonville Jaguars (1995); Pittsburgh Steelers (1996–1997); Indianapolis Colts (1998); Dallas Cowboys (1999); Pittsburgh Steelers (2000)
- * Offseason or practice squad member only

Coaching
- Cleveland Browns (2003–2004); Robert Morris (2005-2006); Cleveland Browns (2007–2009); Memphis (2010); North Carolina (2011); Jacksonville Jaguars (2012–2020)

Awards and highlights
- First-team All-SEC (1991)

Career NFL statistics
- Games played: 60
- Games started: 25
- Fumble recoveries: 1
- Stats at Pro Football Reference

Thomas Joseph Myslinski Jr. (born December 7, 1968) is an American professional football strength and conditioning coach for the Jacksonville Jaguars. He was strength and conditioning coach for the Cleveland Browns until the end of the 2009 season. He is also a former National Football League (NFL) offensive lineman. He was selected by the Dallas Cowboys in the 1992 NFL draft and played nine seasons in the NFL for seven different teams.

== Early life ==
Myslinski attended Rome Free Academy, where he played as a center. As a junior, he was a part of an undefeated season and a state championship. He received All-state honors as a senior.

In track & field, he was a two-time state champion in the discus throw and finished second in the shot put competition.

== College career ==
Myslinski accepted a football scholarship from the University of Tennessee. As a redshirt freshman, he was given his first start at right guard in the second game against Duke University. He then suffered an ankle injury which caused him to miss the next 5 games.

He was a starter at left guard in 37 straight games, dating back to his freshman season, helping the team to a 29–6–2 record, 2 SEC championships and to set a school record for total yards each of his last three years.

He was a member of the 1991 NCAA Champion track & field team. In 1990, he finished third in the shot put in the SEC outdoor meet with a career-best 61 '2" toss. In 1991, he placed fifth in the hammer throw in the SEC outdoor meet.

== Professional career ==
=== Dallas Cowboys (first stint) ===
Myslinski was selected by the Dallas Cowboys in the fourth round (109th overall) of the 1992 NFL draft. He got injured on the first day of training camp, which would limit him going forward. He was waived on August 31 and signed to the practice squad on September 2.

=== Cleveland Browns ===
On September 8, 1992, he was signed by the Cleveland Browns from the Cowboys practice squad. He dressed but did not play in 5 games, before being waived on October 10. On October 14, he was signed to the practice squad. On October 17, he was released.

=== Washington Redskins ===
On October 21, 1992, he was signed to the Washington Redskins' practice squad. He was promoted to the active roster on November 11. He played against the Kansas City Chiefs and the New Orleans Saints. He was released on November 28.

=== Buffalo Bills ===
On April 6, 1993, he was signed by the Buffalo Bills. He was waived on August 30, and re-signed one day later. He appeared in the season opener, but did not play in the next 3 contests. He was declared inactive in 4 games, before being released on November 15.

=== Chicago Bears ===
On November 30, 1993, he was signed by the Chicago Bears. He was declared inactive in his first four games. He played in the season finale against the Los Angeles Rams.

In 1994, he appeared in four games, while being declared inactive in the sixth game against the New Orleans Saints and the two playoff games. He dressed but did not play in 11 games.

=== Jacksonville Jaguars ===
Myslinski was selected by the Jacksonville Jaguars in the 1995 NFL expansion draft from the Chicago Bears roster. He started in the first 9 games at right guard. He was declared inactive for the final 7 games. He was released on March 4, 1996.

=== Pittsburgh Steelers (first stint) ===
On April 24, 1996, he signed with the Pittsburgh Steelers and was waived on August 25. On August 27, he was re-signed and started 6 out of 8 games at right guard.

In 1997, he started 7 out of 16 games at right guard. He was the team's long snapper from game 10 to 14.

=== Indianapolis Colts ===
On February 19, 1998, he was signed by the Indianapolis Colts. He was limited by a rotator cuff surgery to four games and was not re-signed.

=== Dallas Cowboys (second stint) ===
On September 23, 1999, he was signed by the Dallas Cowboys. He played in 10 games (2 starts) and was not re-signed.

=== Pittsburgh Steelers (second stint) ===
On April 7, 2000, he was signed by the Pittsburgh Steelers. He was waived on August 31, 2001. He started in 6 out of 8 games. He started in games 6 through 12 at right guard in place of an injured Brenden Stai.

== Personal life ==
Myslinski developed the “Tunch Punch Ladder” hand agility pad. While still playing in the NFL, he served as a volunteer strength and conditioning coach at the University of North Florida in 1996. He was a volunteer assistant strength and conditioning coach at the University of Pittsburgh from 1998 to 2001. In 2007, he was named the head strength and conditioning coach for the Cleveland Browns.

In 2005 he was hired as the head strength and conditioning coach at Robert Morris University. In 2010, he was hired as the football strength and conditioning coach at the University of Memphis. In 2011, he was named the football strength and conditioning coach at the University of North Carolina. On January 27, 2012, he was hired as the Jacksonville Jaguars strength and conditioning coordinator.

After the first game of his senior season in high school, he was involved in a car accident, in which he was thrown through a rear door window breaking his right leg and forcing him to have over 100 stitches to his head. Despite these injuries, he was able to pull the two passengers that were in the front seat of the car.
