= Lee, New York =

- Town
- Location in Oneida County and the state of New York.
- Coordinates: 43°18′31″N 75°30′46″W
- Country: United States
- State: New York
- County: Oneida

Government
  - Type: Town Council
  - Town Supervisor: John C. Urtz (D)
  - Town Clerk: Laura Kinney (R)
  - Town Council: Members' List: • Kevin P. Gallagher (D); • Harold E. Van Wagenen (D); • Alan J. Trombley (D); • Patrick Hetherington (R)

Area
  - Total: 45.50 sq mi (117.84 km^{2})
  - Land: 45.05 sq mi (116.69 km^{2})
  - Water: 0.45 sq mi (1.16 km^{2})
- Elevation: 938 ft (286 m)

Population (2010)
  - Total: 6,486
  - Estimate (2016): 6,426
  - Density: 142.6/sq mi (55.07/km^{2})
- Time zone: UTC-5 (Eastern (EST))
  - Summer (DST): UTC-4 (EDT)
- ZIP Codes: 13363 (Lee Center); 13440 (Rome); 13471 (Taberg); 13303 (Ava)
- Area codes: 315/680
- FIPS code: 36-41762
- GNIS feature ID: 0979137
- Website: Town of Lee

Lee is a town in Oneida County, New York, United States. The population was 6,486 at the 2010 census.

The Town of Lee is northwest of Rome.

== History ==
The Town of Lee was formed from the Town of Western in 1811. The town was named after Revolutionary War General Charles Lee.

About 1910, the Rome & Osceola Railroad was organized and the rails laid as far as Lee Center, with grading completed along much of the route, intended to carry timber from Tug Hill to a tie plant on a site which is now the Rite Aid warehouse on Rt 69 in Rome.

George W. Kingsbury, for whom (with his brother), the county of Kingsbury, South Dakota, is named, was born in Lee on December 16, 1837.

West Lee was home to a large canning factory.

== Geography ==
According to the United States Census Bureau, the town has a total area of 45.5 square miles (118 km^{2}), of which 45.2 square miles (117 km^{2}) is land and 0.4 square miles (1.0 km^{2}) (0.83%) is water.

Delta Reservoir, also called Delta Lake, is partly in the southeastern part of the town, created in 1911 as a feeder for the New York State Barge Canal by flooding the Village of Delta.

== Demographics ==
Historical population
Census	Pop.	Note	%±
1820	2,186		—
1830	2,514		15.0%
1840	2,936		16.8%
1850	3,025		3.0%
1860	2,796		−7.6%
1870	2,656		−5.0%
1880	2,360		−11.1%
1890	1,845		−21.8%
1900	1,671		−9.4%
1910	1,379		−17.5%
1920	1,134		−17.8%
1930	1,300		14.6%
1940	1,482		14.0%
1950	1,856		25.2%
1960	4,302		131.8%
1970	6,095		41.7%
1980	6,892		13.1%
1990	7,115		3.2%
2000	6,875		−3.4%
2010	6,486		−5.7%
2016 (est.)	6,426		−0.9%
U.S. Decennial Census

As of the census of 2000, there were 6,875 people, 2,563 households, and 1,970 families residing in the town. The population density was 152.2 inhabitants per square mile (58.8/km^{2}). There were 2,699 housing units at an average density of 59.8 per square mile (23.1/km^{2}). The racial makeup of the town was 97.41% White, 0.86% African American, 0.19% Native American, 0.47% Asian, 0.01% Pacific Islander, 0.22% from other races, and 0.84% from two or more races. Hispanic or Latino of any race were 0.80% of the population.

There were 2,563 households, out of which 35.4% had children under the age of 18 living with them, 63.4% were married couples living together, 8.8% had a female householder with no husband present, and 23.1% were non-families. 19.7% of all households were made up of individuals, and 9.7% had someone living alone who was 65 years of age or older. The average household size was 2.67 and the average family size was 3.05.

In the town, the population was spread out, with 26.7% under the age of 18, 6.6% from 18 to 24, 28.1% from 25 to 44, 25.4% from 45 to 64, and 13.2% who were 65 years of age or older. The median age was 38 years. For every 100 females, there were 99.7 males. For every 100 females age 18 and over, there were 97.6 males.

The median income for a household in the town was $47,074, and the median income for a family was $51,676. Males had a median income of $34,811 versus $25,522 for females. The per capita income for the town was $20,588. About 5.8% of families and 8.1% of the population were below the poverty line, including 13.1% of those under age 18 and 6.3% of those age 65 or over.

== Communities and locations in Lee ==
- Brookfield – A hamlet neat the western town line.
- Delta Reservoir – A reservoir at the southeastern border of the town.
- Elmer Hill – A location in the southeastern corner of the town.
- Hawkins Corner – A hamlet south of Lake Delta on Route 26.
- Lake Delta – A hamlet near the Delta Reservoir on Route 26.
- Lee – The hamlet of Lee is in the southwestern corner of the town on Route 69.
- Lee Center – A hamlet west of Stokes Corner.
- Point Rock – A location in the northwestern corner of the town.
- Stokes Corner – A hamlet north of Lake Delta on Route 26.
- West Branch – A hamlet in the northeastern corner of the town on Route 26.
- West Lee – A hamlet between Brookfield and Lee Center on Route 53.

== Schooling ==
Students attend schools in one of three area districts: Rome City School District, Camden School District or Adirondack School District in Boonville, New York.

On the present site of the Methodist Church, the first school in Lee was built and went by the name of Lee Center School – District 3, which later became District 1. The school remained open until Lee Center School merged with Rome District Schools in 1957. School remained open until June 1960; The school building was used for storage by town highway department for a period of time, then building was demolished.

On the corner of Streun Road and Point Rock road is another one of the first and main schoolhouses in Lee Center. Settlers called this the Stone Schoolhouse-District 5. This also held classes until the merge in 1957. Students then went to Lee Center school until it closed in June 1960.

On the corner of Lorena road and Sleepy Hollow road held another schoolhouse. The property lines show half of the building in Rome and the other in Lee center.
