= Delta Lake State Park =

State park in Oneida County, New York

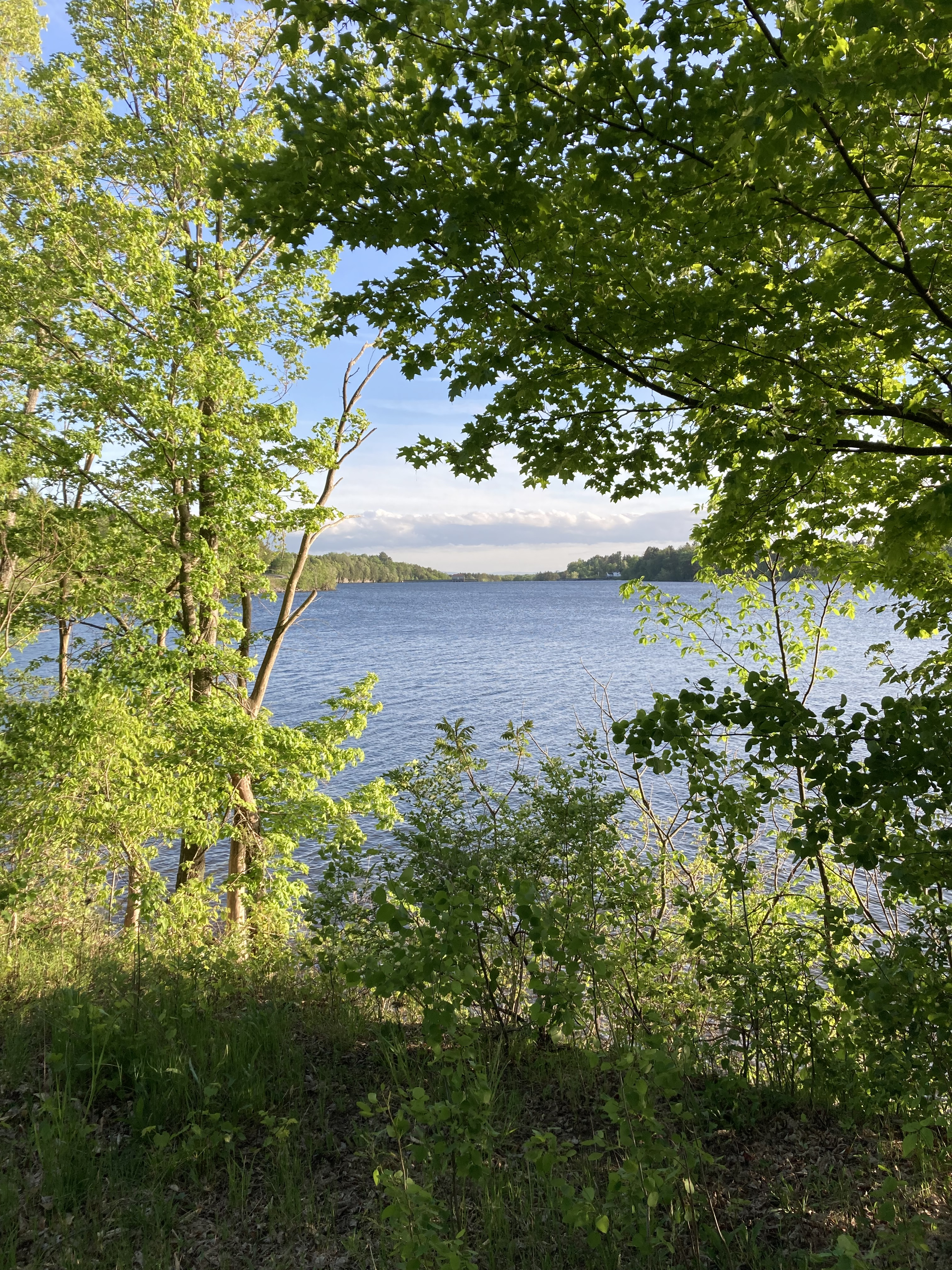
- Delta Lake State Park, May 2021

- Location within New York
- Type: State park
- Location: 8797 State Route 46; Rome, New York
- Nearest city: Rome, New York
- Coordinates: 43°17′24″N 75°24′54″W
- Area: 720 acres (2.9 km^{2})
- Created: 1962
- Operator: New York State Office of Parks, Recreation and Historic Preservation
- Visitors: 309,577 (in 2022)
- Open: All year
- Camp sites: 101
- Website: Delta Lake State Park

Delta Lake State Park is a 720-acre (2.9 km^{2}) New York state park located on a peninsula extending from the southeast shore of Delta Lake in Oneida County, New York, United States. It is located off New York State Route 46, southwest of Westernville and north of Rome, New York.

== History ==
The peninsula that today contains Delta Lake State Park was created when the Mohawk River was impounded in 1908 to form Delta Lake, a reservoir intended to supply water to the New York State Barge Canal. The New York State Canal Corporation leased approximately 350 acres (1.4 km^{2}) to the New York State Office of Parks, Recreation and Historic Preservation for the creation of a state park in 1962. In 2005, it was announced that the Canal Corporation would officially transfer the park's land, along with an additional 370 acres (1.5 km^{2}), to the NYSOPRHP, bringing the park's total area to 720 acres (2.9 km^{2}). In 2023, a portion of the park was created into a large dumping station, as previously there was only one small one.

== Facilities ==
The park offers a beach, picnic tables and pavilions, volleyball nets, swing sets, a playground, a food concession, trails for hiking and bike riding, cross-country skiing, snowmobiling and ice fishing, recreation programs, a boat launch, a 3 loop campground with 101 tent and trailer sites, showers and multiple dump stations.

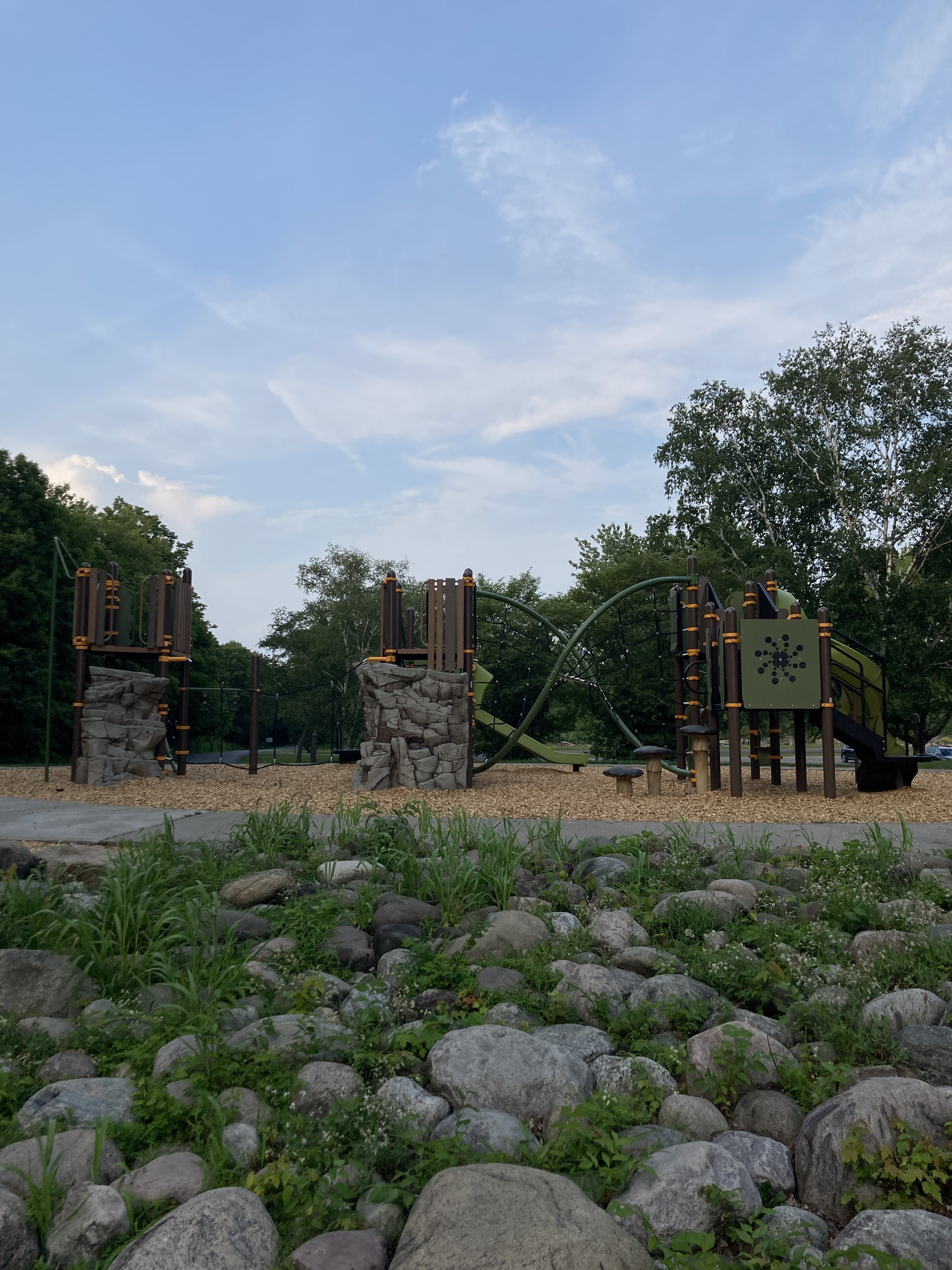
Playground at the beach.

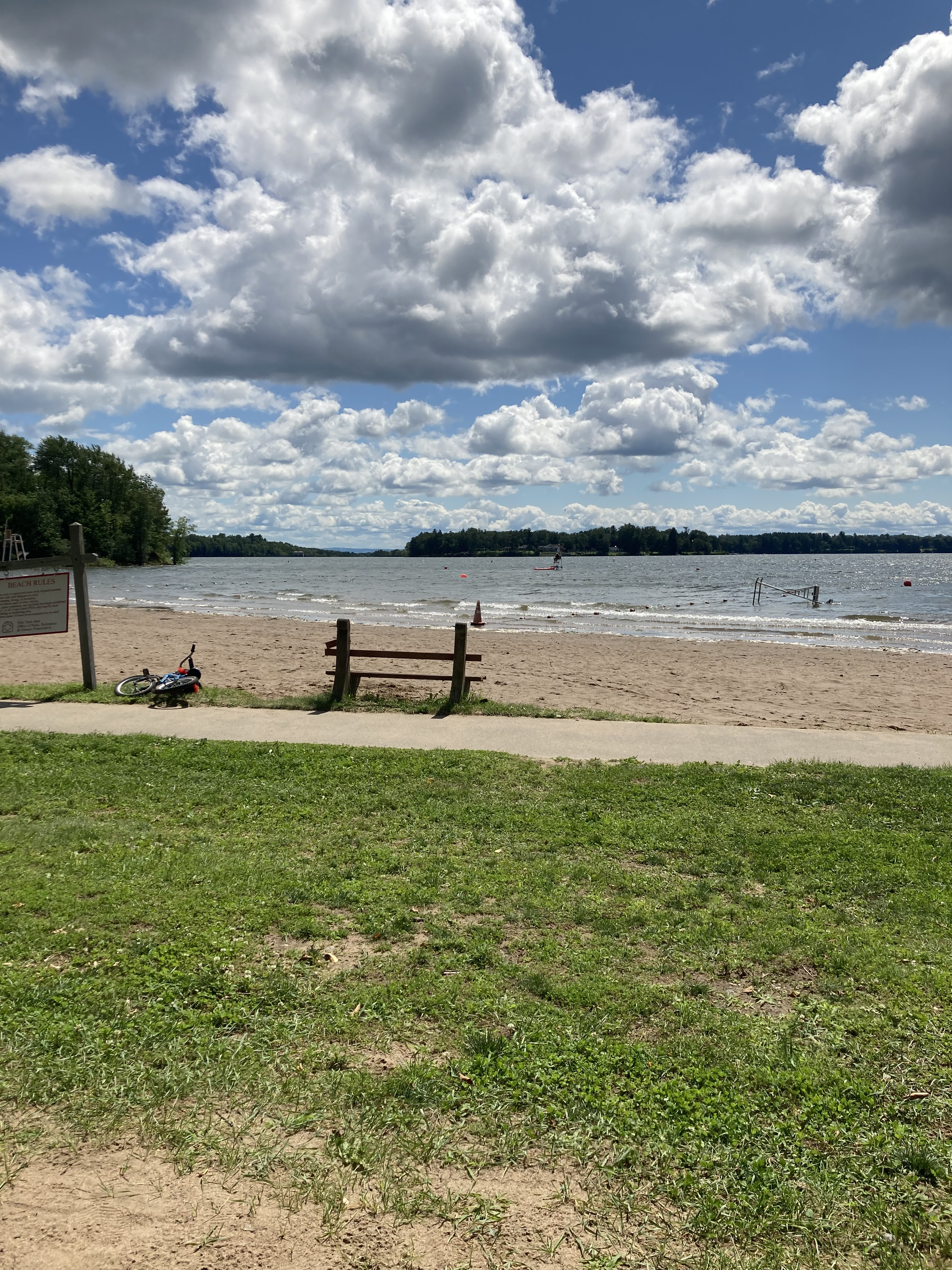
Beach with the dam visible to the left.

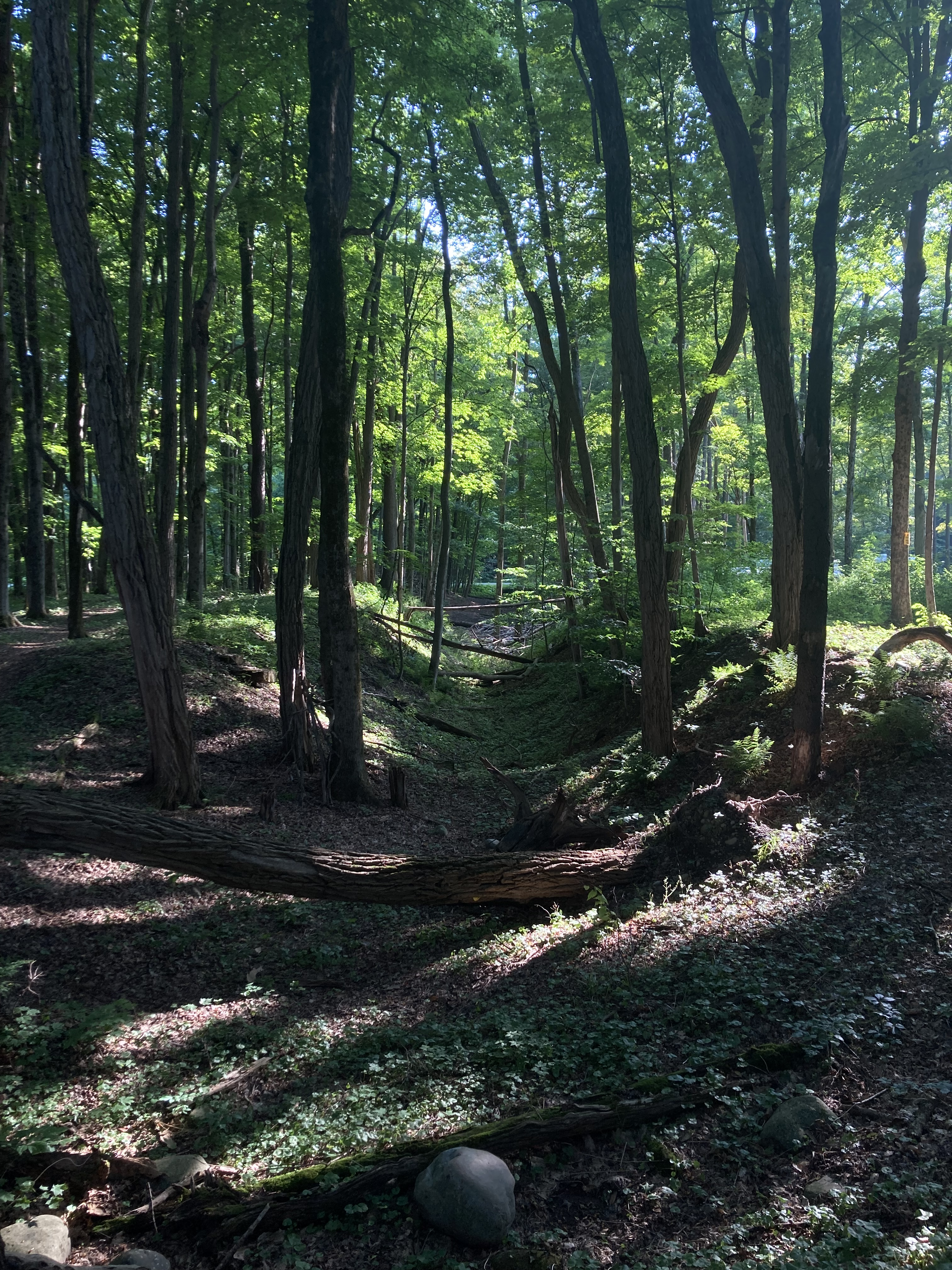
Walking trail near camping loop A.

== See also ==
- List of New York state parks
