= Veteran, Ulster County, New York =

Veteran, New York
- Hamlet
- Location within New York Location within the United States
- Coordinates: 42°04′49″N 73°59′39″W
- Country: United States
- State: New York
- County: Ulster
- Elevation: 236 ft (72 m)
- Time zone: UTC-5 (Eastern (EST))
  - Summer (DST): UTC-4 (EDT)
- Area code: 845
- GNIS feature ID: 968520

Veteran is a hamlet in Ulster County, New York, United States. The community is located along New York State Route 212, 2.1 miles (3.4 km) west of Saugerties.
