= Rome City School District (New York) =

School district in New York, United States

Rome City School District is a school district headquartered in Rome, New York.

The district includes the majority of the City of Rome. It also includes portions of the following towns: Annsville, Lee, Verona, and Western. The Rome school district includes the census-designated places of Lake Delta and Westernville.

== History ==
In 2019 the board of trustees extended the contract of superintendent Peter C. Blake by five years.

In 2023, Mike Jaquays of the Rome Daily Sentinel wrote that the board of trustees "is not currently planning to renew" the contract of Blake.

== Schools ==
Secondary schools

- Rome Free Academy (high school)
- Strough Middle School

Elementary schools

- Francis Bellamy
- Louis V. Denti
- Gansevoort
- John E. Joy
- Ridge Mills
- Stokes

Preschool

- Early Childhood Program / Pre-Kindergarten
