= Little York, New York =

- Hamlet
- Location within New York Location within the United States
- Coordinates: 42°41′45″N 76°09′52″W
- Country: United States
- State: New York
- County: Cortland
- Elevation: 1,161 ft (354 m)
- Time zone: UTC-5 (Eastern (EST))
  - Summer (DST): UTC-4 (EDT)
- ZIP Code: 13087
- Area code: 607
- GNIS feature ID: 955736

Little York is a hamlet in Cortland County, New York, United States. The community is located along New York State Route 281, 6.6 miles (10.6 km) north of Cortland. Little York has a post office with ZIP code 13087, which opened on April 11, 1836.
