= Western, New York =

- Town
- Location in Oneida County and the state of New York.
- Coordinates: 43°19′36″N 75°23′33″W
- Country: United States
- State: New York
- County: Oneida

Government
  - Type: Town Council
  - Town Supervisor: Anna Radell-Weaver(R)
  - Town Council: Members' List: Peter Donahue, Sr. (R); Lawrence Mierek (R); David Schallenberg (R); Leonard Charney (R)

Area
  - Total: 54.67 sq mi (141.60 km^{2})
  - Land: 51.20 sq mi (132.62 km^{2})
  - Water: 3.46 sq mi (8.97 km^{2})
- Elevation: 974 ft (297 m)

Population (2010)
  - Total: 1,951
  - Estimate (2016): 1,945
  - Density: 38.0/sq mi (14.67/km^{2})
- Time zone: UTC-5 (Eastern (EST))
  - Summer (DST): UTC-4 (EDT)
- ZIP Codes: 13486 (Westernville); 13303 (Ava); 13309 (Boonville); 13354 (Holland Patent); 13440 (Rome)
- FIPS code: 36-79862
- GNIS feature ID: 0979620
- Website: Town of Western

Western is a town in Oneida County, New York, United States. The population was 1,951 at the 2010 census.

The Town of Western is an interior town of Oneida County, north of Rome.

== History ==
The town was first settled circa 1789. The Town of Western was formed in 1797 from the Town of Steuben. In 1811, part of Western was used to form the newer Town of Lee.

== Town of Western, today ==
There is no active senior citizens group that meets monthly for activities. The Western Town Library offers programs for children and adults, and the historical society provides lectures and events for those registered as a part of the Historical Society. There is currently one church in Westernville, the First Presbyterian Church on Stokes-Westernville Road. North Western has one church, the United Methodist Church, located on Route 46.

The Town of Western did hold the Heritage Days every year with the last in 2012.

This is the location of Gen. William Floyd's second home, and is also where he is buried. Veronica Murphy can be contacted if anyone would like historical information on Westernville.

== Geography ==
According to the United States Census Bureau, the town has a total area of 54.7 square miles (142 km^{2}), of which 51.4 square miles (133 km^{2}) is land and 3.3 square miles (8.5 km^{2}) (6.11%) is water.

Delta Reservoir, also called Delta Lake, is mostly in the southwestern part of the town.

== Demographics ==
Historical population
Census	Pop.	Note	%±
1800	1,493		—
1810	2,416		61.8%
1820	2,237		−7.4%
1830	2,419		8.1%
1840	3,488		44.2%
1850	2,524		−27.6%
1860	2,197		−13.0%
1870	2,423		10.3%
1880	2,264		−6.6%
1890	1,817		−19.7%
1900	1,621		−10.8%
1910	1,355		−16.4%
1920	1,061		−21.7%
1930	1,139		7.4%
1940	1,103		−3.2%
1950	1,352		22.6%
1960	1,611		19.2%
1970	2,072		28.6%
1980	1,954		−5.7%
1990	2,057		5.3%
2000	2,029		−1.4%
2010	1,951		−3.8%
2016 (est.)	1,945		−0.3%
U.S. Decennial Census

As of the census of 2000, there were 2,029 people, 752 households, and 573 families residing in the town. The population density was 39.5 inhabitants per square mile (15.3/km^{2}). There were 833 housing units at an average density of 16.2 per square mile (6.3/km^{2}). The racial makeup of the town was 97.54% White, 0.20% African American, 0.69% Native American, 0.59% Asian, and 0.99% from two or more races. Hispanic or Latino of any race were 0.59% of the population.

There were 752 households, out of which 35.2% had children under the age of 18 living with them, 62.8% were married couples living together, 7.8% had a female householder with no husband present, and 23.7% were non-families. 19.3% of all households were made up of individuals, and 7.3% had someone living alone who was 65 years of age or older. The average household size was 2.70 and the average family size was 3.10.

In the town, the population was spread out, with 27.1% under the age of 18, 5.8% from 18 to 24, 30.8% from 25 to 44, 22.9% from 45 to 64, and 13.4% who were 65 years of age or older. The median age was 38 years. For every 100 females, there were 107.0 males. For every 100 females age 18 and over, there were 106.6 males.

The median income for a household in the town was $42,337, and the median income for a family was $46,629. Males had a median income of $32,171 versus $27,097 for females. The per capita income for the town was $20,217. About 3.8% of families and 8.0% of the population were below the poverty line, including 9.4% of those under age 18 and 3.6% of those age 65 or over.

== Communities and locations in Western ==
- Beartown – A hamlet near the western town line, north of Delta Lake.
- Buck Hill – An elevation located north of Westernville.
- Carmichael Hill – A hamlet near the eastern town line, located north of Big Brook.
- Clark Hill – An elevation located northeast of Westernville.
- Big Brook – A hamlet near the eastern town boundary.
- Delta Reservoir – A reservoir in the southwestern part of the town.
- Delta Lake State Park – A state park on the south side of Delta Lake.
- Dopp Hill – An elevation located west of Gifford Hill.
- Dunbar – A hamlet near the northern town line on NY 46.
- Frenchville – A hamlet northeast of Westernville on Route 46.
- Gifford Hill – An elevation located south of Westernville.
- Haynes Hill – An elevation located east of West Branch.
- Hillside – A hamlet northwest of North Western on Route 46.
- Meszler Hill – An elevation located north of Carmichael Hill.
- North Western – A hamlet north of Frenchville on Route 46.
- Quaker Hill – An elevation located northwest of Westernville.
- Tripp Pinnacle – An elevation located north of Westernville.
- Westernville – A hamlet at the eastern end of Delta Lake on Route 46.
- Woods Valley – A ski resort in the southwestern part of the town.

== Notable person ==
- George Washington Gale had a farm in the 1820s, where he tutored ministerial students, including Theodore Weld and Charles Grandison Finney, in exchange for their labor. It was a forerunner of the Oneida Institute of Science and Industry, in Whitesboro, which Gale founded.
