= Lower South Bay, New York =

Lower South Bay
- hamlet
- Location within New York
- Coordinates: 43°12′00″N 76°3′47″W
- Country: United States
- State: New York
- County: Oneida
- Time zone: UTC-5 (Eastern (EST))
  - Summer (DST): UTC-4 (EDT)
- Area code: 315
- GNIS feature ID: 956111

Lower South Bay, commonly called South Bay, is a hamlet on the southwest corner of Oneida Lake, Oneida County, New York, United States. It is opposite North Bay, and is surrounded by many islands to the west, north and east, including Geersbeck Island, Hall Island, Glosky Island, Schroeppel Island, Denmans Island and Long Island (not to be confused with Long Island, New York City). Lower South Bay also lies near the town of Cicero, approximately two miles west.
