= Delta Reservoir =

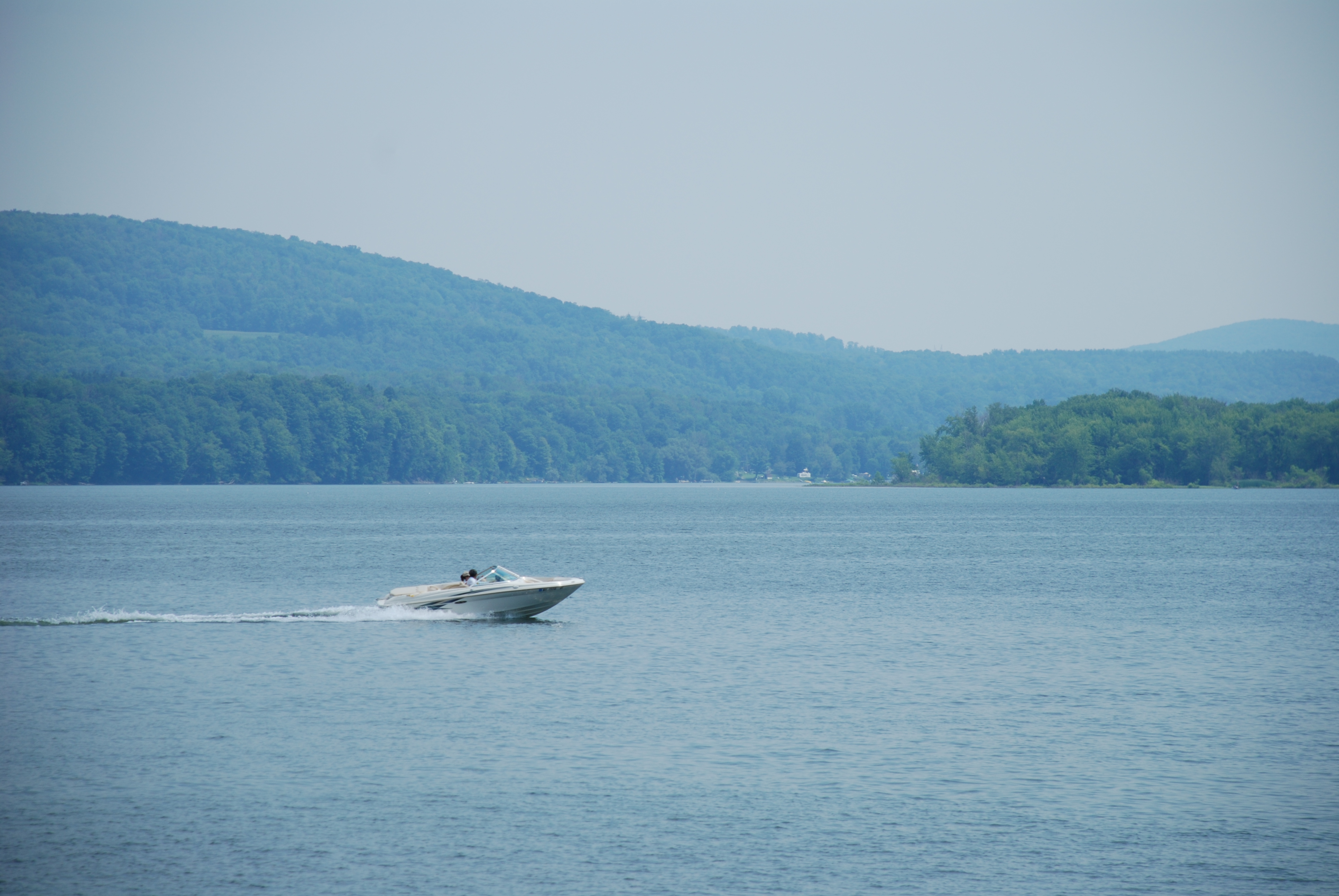
- View of Delta Reservoir, looking East.

- Location within New York Delta Reservoir (the United States)
- Location: Oneida County, New York
- Coordinates: 43°17′22″N 75°26′11″W
- Type: Reservoir
- Primary inflows: Mohawk River, Potash Creek, Sprinks Brook, Griffith Brook
- Primary outflows: Mohawk River
- Basin countries: United States
- Surface area: 2,377 acres (3.714 mi^{2}; 9.62 km^{2})
- Average depth: 22 feet (6.7 m)
- Max. depth: 60 feet (18 m)
- Shore length^{1}: 18.7 miles (30.1 km)
- Surface elevation: 548 feet (167 m)
- Islands: 4
- Settlements: Rome, Westernville
- ^{1} Shore length is not a well-defined measure.

Delta Reservoir, also known as Delta Lake, is a reservoir located in Oneida County, New York, United States. It was formed by the impoundment of the Mohawk River. Most of the lake is within the southwest part of the Town of Western, north of Rome. The western part of the lake is in the Town of Lee.

Delta Lake State Park is located on a peninsula extending from the south shore of the lake.

== Fishing ==
The reservoir also offers great fishing. Fish species that are present in the reservoir are walleye, smallmouth bass, northern pike, chain pickerel, rock bass, pumpkinseed sunfish, brown bullhead, yellow perch, brown trout, and common carp. There is a state owned access with two concrete ramps on the east shore in the state park off NY 46, five miles north of Rome. There is parking for 70 trucks and trailers. There is also a marina on the lake.

== History ==
The reservoir was created by a dam on the Mohawk River, for which construction began in 1908. The dam is on the south side of the reservoir, southwest of Delta Lake State Park. Originally, the purpose of the reservoir was to guarantee sufficient water for the Erie Canal; today, however, it is used to control flooding in the Mohawk basin. The reservoir contains 2.7 million cubic feet (76,000 m^{3}) of water.

The dam flooded the community of Delta, which was located on the west bank of the river. Most of the structures of the village were torn down and moved to new locations before the inundation.

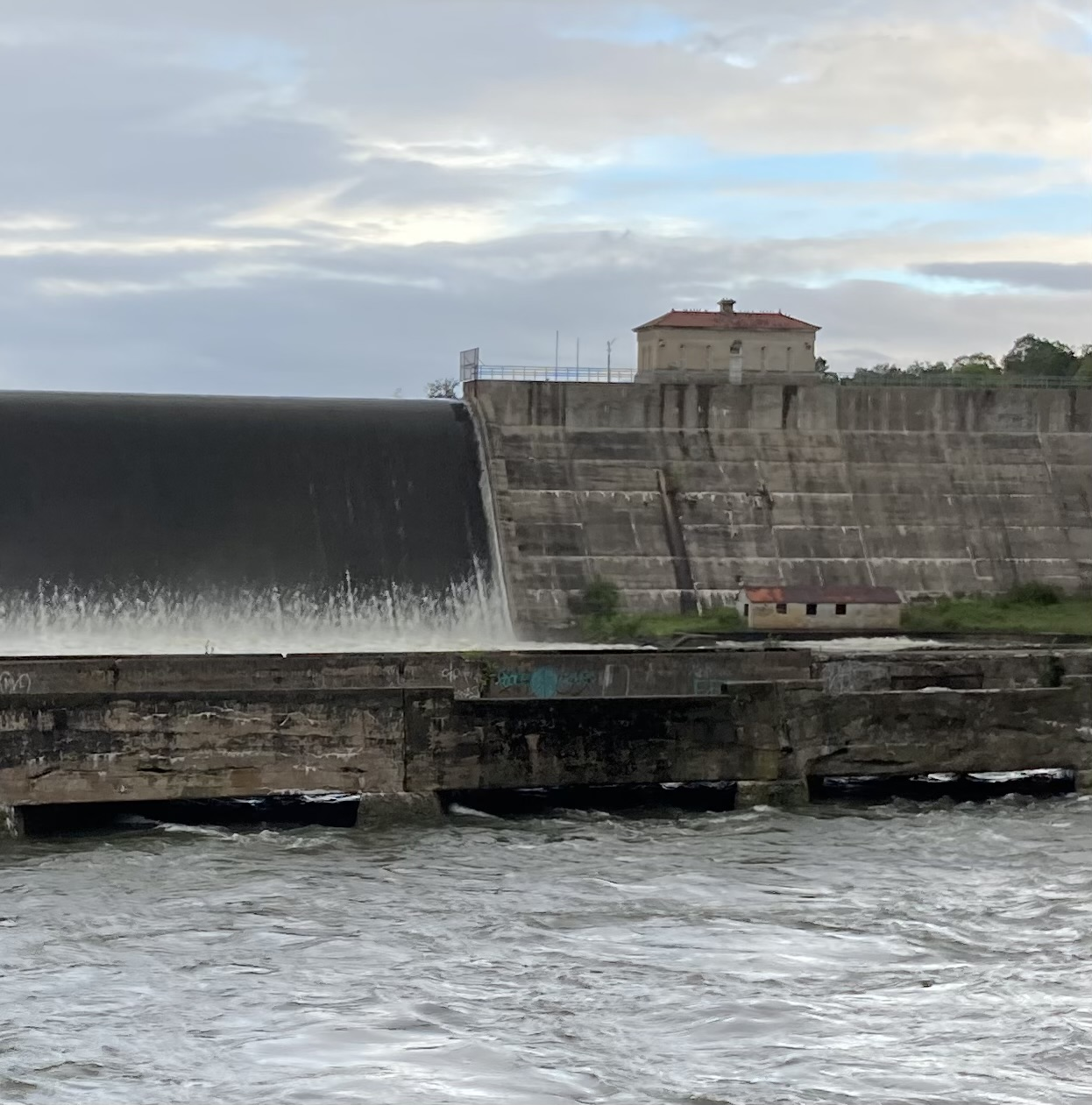
Delta Dam, August 2021

== See also ==
- List of reservoirs and dams in New York
