= Verona Mills, New York =

Verona Mills
- hamlet
- Verona Mills's position in New York.
- Coordinates: 43°11′50″N 75°33′32″W
- Country: United States
- State: New York
- County: Oneida
- Elevation: 443 ft (135 m)
- Time zone: UTC-5 (Eastern (EST))
  - Summer (DST): UTC-4 (EDT)
- GNIS feature ID: 968506

Verona Mills is a hamlet in Oneida County, New York, United States. On April 26, 2011, a tornado (classified as EF-1) with 100 mph winds associated with the 2011 Super Outbreak hit a wooded area near Verona Mills, near New York State Route 49, uprooting trees and snapping a power pole before replacing it.
