= Lee Center, New York =

- Hamlet
- Location within New York Location within the United States
- Coordinates: 43°18′12″N 75°31′05″W
- Country: United States
- State: New York
- County: Oneida
- Town: Lee
- Elevation: 617 ft (188 m)
- Time zone: UTC-5 (Eastern (EST))
  - Summer (DST): UTC-4 (EDT)
- ZIP code: 13363
- Area code: 315

Lee Center is a hamlet located in the Town of Lee in Oneida County, New York. It is located northwest of Rome, New York.
