= Ava, New York =

- Town
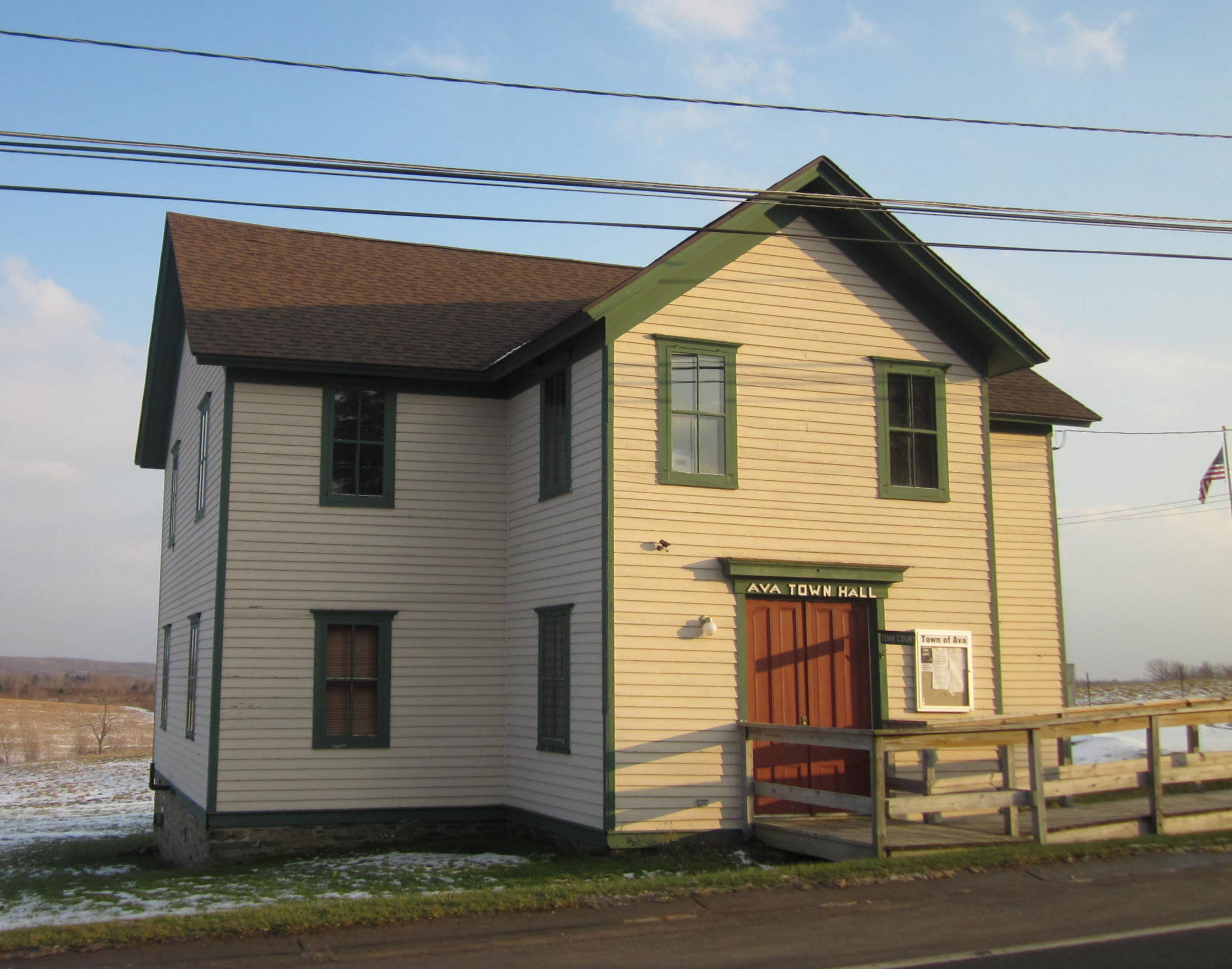
- Ava Town Hall, January 2012

- Location in Oneida County and the state of New York.
- Coordinates: 43°24′59″N 75°27′43″W
- Country: United States
- State: New York
- County: Oneida

Government
  - Type: Town Council
  - Town Supervisor: Keith Redhead (L)
  - Town Council: Members' List: • Steve Perez (R); • David E. Rundle (D); • John A. Doiron (R); • Richard J. Bator (R)

Area
  - Total: 37.71 sq mi (97.66 km^{2})
  - Land: 37.67 sq mi (97.56 km^{2})
  - Water: 0.039 sq mi (0.10 km^{2})
- Elevation: 1,368 ft (417 m)

Population (2010)
  - Total: 676
  - Estimate (2016): 704
  - Density: 18.7/sq mi (7.22/km^{2})
- Time zone: UTC-5 (Eastern (EST))
  - Summer (DST): UTC-4 (EDT)
- ZIP Codes: 13303 (Ava); 13309 (Boonville)
- Area code: 315
- FIPS code: 36-03309
- GNIS feature ID: 0978701
- Website: Town of Ava

Ava is a town in Oneida County, New York, United States. The population was 680 at the 2020 census.

The Town of Ava is in the north central part of the county. Ava is north of the city of Rome.

== History ==
Ava was formed from Boonville on May 12, 1846. It was the second to last town to be created in the county, followed only by Forestport in 1869.

=== Early settlers ===
Ava was settled in 1798 by Ebenezer Harger, who two years prior moved to Whitestown from Connecticut. The next settlers were Zephaniah and Abner Wood. Isaac Knight arrived from Rhode Island in 1798 or 1799. Around 1800, Philo Harger, Benjamin Jones, Lemuel Wood, Justus Beardsley and Salmon Bates (who opened the town's first tavern in his house) arrived. Daniel Buck, an American Revolutionary War veteran arrived from Massachusetts in 1800. Other early settlers were Rickerson Kenyon, Joseph Hunt, Remember Kent, who built an early saw-mill, and Bates, Barnard, Fanning, Adams, Beck, Tiffany.

The first child born in Ava was Chauncey Harger in March 1801. The first saw-mill was built in 1801 by Philo Harger and Benjamin Jones.

=== Land ===
The town is made up of land of:

- Adgate patent, a 45,000 acre patent issued to Matthew Adgate. Adgate was a member of the NY assembly and the US constitutional convention.
- the Oothoudt Patent, a 16,052 acre patent issued to Henry Oothoudt in 1786 (about one have of Ava lies within this patent). Oothoudt was a delegate to the New York Provincial Congress in 1775 and 1776, Albany County assemblyman in the 3rd New York State Legislature, 1779–1780, one of three commissioners of forfeitures under the New York Act of Attainder which seized the property of loyalists, and delegate to the US constitutional convention.
- the Gore Patent, a 15,360 acre patent issued to Thomas Machin in 1787 (one of the several Machin Patents). Machin was an engineer and surveyor and used his skills in support of the American Revolutionary War.
- the Scriba Patent, land first acquired by John and Nicholas Roosevelt in 1791 from the New York State Land Commission. This patent was for 530,000 acres situated in present Oswego and Oneida counties. Approximately 499,000 acres of the Roosevelt Tract became Scriba's Patent in 1793 as partial payment of debts owed to the Scriba Bank by the Roosevelts.
- the Franklin and Robinson Tract (also called the Quaker Tract), a 75,000 acre parcel purchased from George Scriba in 1795.
- the Muller Tract, a 1615-acre previously part of the Franklin and Robinson Tract that whose mortgage was foreclosed upon by Rembrandt Muller.

=== Civic formation ===
Ava was created by the legislature on May 12, 1846. The first town meeting was held on May 26, 1846. The following positions were filled: Town Supervisor, Town Clerk, Justices of the Peace (4), Assessors (3), Commissioner of Highways (3), Overseers of the Poor (2), Collector, Constables (4), Superintendent of Schools (1), Sealer of Weights and Measures.

=== Name ===
Ava was named after the Kingdom of Ava.

=== Commerce ===
An early road connecting Fort Stanwix to Carthage passed through the town. It was known as the old "French Road" from the time that Carthage was a French settlement on the Black River.

A plank road was constructed through Ava connecting Rome and Turin by the Rome and Turin Plank-Road Company in 1848. It was abandoned in 1855.

The area was primarily agricultural before becoming more dependent on dairying in the second half of the 19th century, when six cheese factories were located in Ava.

The Ava Town Hall was listed on the National Register of Historic Places in 1992.

== Geography ==
According to the United States Census Bureau, the town has a total area of 37.7 square miles (98 km^{2}), of which 37.7 square miles (98 km^{2}) is land and 0.04 square miles (0.10 km^{2}) (0.08%) is water.

Ava is located within the Tug Hill Plateau region of New York, and the northern town line is the border of Lewis County. The Mohawk and Black rivers run through Ava, and Fish Creek forms Ava's western border with the Town of Annsville.

== Demographics ==
Historical population
Census	Pop.	Note	%±
1850	1,027		—
1860	1,260		22.7%
1870	1,160		−7.9%
1880	1,039		−10.4%
1890	860		−17.2%
1900	706		−17.9%
1910	563		−20.3%
1920	615		9.2%
1930	588		−4.4%
1940	520		−11.6%
1950	452		−13.1%
1960	518		14.6%
1970	541		4.4%
1980	664		22.7%
1990	792		19.3%
2000	725		−8.5%
2010	676		−6.8%
2016 (est.)	704		4.1%
U.S. Decennial Census

As of the census of 2000, there were 725 people, 257 households, and 193 families residing in the town. The population density was 19.2 inhabitants per square mile (7.4/km^{2}). There were 285 housing units at an average density of 7.6 per square mile (2.9/km^{2}). The racial makeup of the town was 98.21% White, 0.97% African American, 0.14% Native American, 0.14% from other races, and 0.55% from two or more races. Hispanic or Latino of any race were 0.83% of the population.

There were 257 households, out of which 38.5% had children under the age of 18 living with them, 59.9% were married couples living together, 8.6% had a female householder with no husband present, and 24.9% were non-families. 21.0% of all households were made up of individuals, and 8.2% had someone living alone who was 65 years of age or older. The average household size was 2.82 and the average family size was 3.25.

In the town, the population was spread out, with 30.3% under the age of 18, 4.8% from 18 to 24, 31.4% from 25 to 44, 21.5% from 45 to 64, and 11.9% who were 65 years of age or older. The median age was 36 years. For every 100 females, there were 107.1 males. For every 100 females age 18 and over, there were 106.1 males.

The median income for a household in the town was $31,750, and the median income for a family was $40,000. Males had a median income of $28,750 versus $27,500 for females. The per capita income for the town was $13,406. About 14.9% of families and 20.1% of the population were below the poverty line, including 28.8% of those under age 18 and 14.9% of those age 65 or over.

== Communities and locations in Ava ==
- Ava – The hamlet of Ava is on NY 26.
- Flint Town – A hamlet south of Ava.
- Redmond Corner – A hamlet in the northeastern corner of the town.
- Webster Hill – An elevation located northeast of Flint Town.

== Notable people ==
- Hiram Cronk, the last surviving veteran of the War of 1812 at the time of his death lived in Ava from 1837 until his death in 1905
- Nat Foster, legendary American Revolutionary War scout and Indian fighter, who is a possible inspiration for James Fenimore Cooper's character of "Natty Bumppo," was buried in a family plot just west of Ava Corners on the West Ava Road. A modern marker was placed there in 1937 by Rev. Clarence Mason, his biographer.
