= Westernville, New York =

Hamlet in New York, United States

- Hamlet and census-designated place
- Location within New York Location within the United States
- Coordinates: 43°18′20″N 75°22′59″W
- Country: United States
- State: New York
- County: Oneida

Area
  - Total: 0.39 sq mi (1.00 km^{2})
  - Land: 0.36 sq mi (0.92 km^{2})
  - Water: 0.031 sq mi (0.08 km^{2})
- Elevation: 561 ft (171 m)
- Time zone: UTC-5 (Eastern (EST))
  - Summer (DST): UTC-4 (EDT)
- ZIP Code: 13486
- Area code: 315
- GNIS feature ID: 970916

Westernville, New York is a hamlet (and census-designated place) in Oneida County, located west of Adirondack Park and north of Rome, and Utica. As of the 2020 census, Westernville had a population of 144. Westernville is in the Town of Western, adjacent to Delta Reservoir and Delta Lake State Park.

== History ==
The Town of Western was formed from the Town of Steuben on March 10, 1797. Its 40,000 acres (16,000 ha) contain fertile soil and an abundant supply of water, including the Mohawk River, Lansing Kill, Big Brook, Stringer Brook, and other small streams. Westernville is the birthplace of Gen. Henry Halleck, one time Commander-in-Chief of the Union Armies. Westernville is also the birthplace of none-time National NASCAR Modified Champion and 2012 NASCAR Hall of Fame Inductee Richie Evans.

Gustavus Swan, a supporter of Samuel F. B. Morse, the inventor of the first Telegraph System, worked closely with Morse to build and extend the telegraph lines across New York State. Swan constructed and resided in the Swan Homestead still located on Main Street in the upper village. The Swan home is on the walking tour of roughly 18 historic homes along Main Street in the village. A handout of the Tour is available from the Westerville Historical Society, from the Swan Home B&B or the Town Hall.

The list is also available during the Annual "Heritage Days", a special three-day celebration on Main Street to honor past residents of historical note. The weekend consists of historical re-enactments and encampments. Also included are period craftsmen, cooking, military, costuming, a quilt show, musical events, fireworks, and refreshments. The weekend kicks off with fireworks on Friday evening and the event closes on Sunday afternoon.

Buried here are Gen. William Floyd, a famous Revolutionary War soldier and a signer of the Declaration of Independence, Admiral Montgomery Sicard of Civil War fame, and Gustavus Swan. Also buried here is Richie Evans, who died following a crash at Martinsville (Virginia) Speedway.

=== 2021 Tornado ===
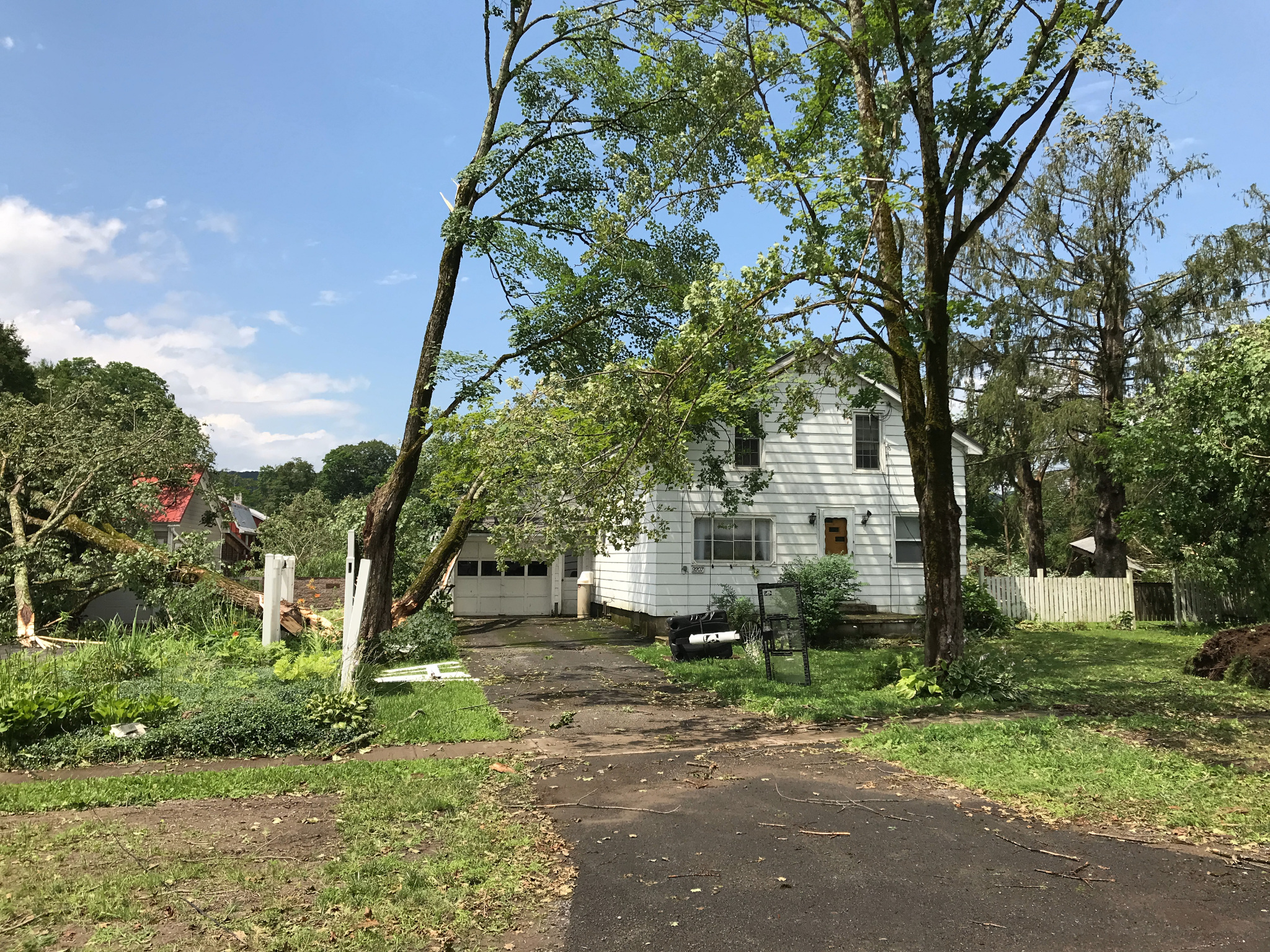
House and tree damage from 2021 Westernville, NY tornado

The National Weather Service in Binghamton confirmed an EF-1 tornado in Westernville on 8 July 2021. It touched down at 7:30 pm local time in the Woods Valley Ski Area, moving northeast towards downtown Westernville. There it caused considerable damage along Main Street, with several roofs blown off houses and numerous trees uprooted or snapped. Continuing its northeasterly track, it then crossed the Mohawk River and parallelled east of River Road, leading to crop damage and a roof torn off of a barn before lifting.

== Westernville today ==
There is an active senior citizens group that meets monthly for activities. The Western Town Library offers programs for children and adults, and the historical society provides lectures and events for the entire community. There are currently two churches in Westernville, the United Methodist Church on Main Street and the First Presbyterian Church on Stokes-Westernville Road. North Western has one church, the United Methodist Church, located on Route 46. The town has various local businesses including The Swan Home Bed and Breakfast and Woods Valley Ski Area.

This is the location of Gen. William Floyd's second home, and is also where he is buried. Every year, Dr. Russell Marriot, in current residence of this home, helps hold a town ceremony in Gen. William Floyd's honor.

The Gen. William Floyd House was listed on the National Register of Historic Places in 1971. The Western Town Hall was listed in 1995.

== Education ==
It is in the Rome City School District, which operates Rome Free Academy.
