= Oneida County, New York =

County in the United States

- County
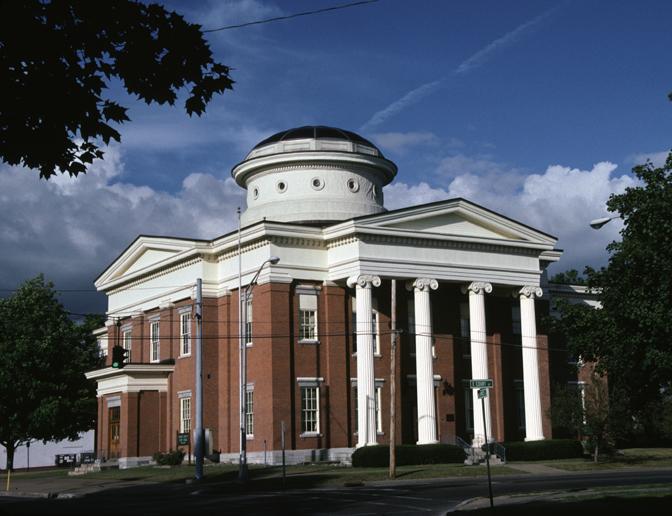
- Oneida County Courthouse

- Flag Seal

- Location within the U.S. state of New York
- Coordinates: 43°14′N 75°26′W
- Country: United States
- State: New York
- Founded: 1798
- Named for: Oneida people
- Seat: Utica
- Largest city: Utica

Area
  - Total: 1,258 sq mi (3,260 km^{2})
  - Land: 1,212 sq mi (3,140 km^{2})
  - Water: 45 sq mi (120 km^{2}) 3.6%

Population (2020)
  - Total: 232,125
  - Estimate (2025): 226,392 ▼
  - Density: 188.4/sq mi (72.7/km^{2})
- Time zone: UTC−5 (Eastern)
  - Summer (DST): UTC−4 (EDT)
- Congressional districts: 21st, 22nd
- Website: oneidacountyny.gov

Oneida County (/oʊˈnaɪdə/ oh-NYE-də) is a county in the state of New York, United States. As of February 26, 2024, the population was 226,654. The county seat is Utica. The county is part of the Mohawk Valley region of the state.

The county is named in honor of the Oneida, one of the Five Nations of the Iroquois League or Haudenosaunee, which had long occupied this territory at the time of European encounter and colonization. The federally recognized Oneida Indian Nation has had a reservation in the region since the late 18th century, after the American Revolutionary War. Oneida County is part of the Utica–Rome, NY Metropolitan Statistical Area.

== History ==
When England established colonial counties in the Province of New York in 1683, the territory of present Oneida County was included in a very large, mostly undeveloped Albany County. This county included the northern part of present-day New York State as well as all of the present state of Vermont and, in theory, extended westward to the Pacific Ocean. This county was reduced in size on July 3, 1766, to create Cumberland County, and further on March 16, 1770, by the creation of Gloucester County, both containing territory now in Vermont.

On March 12, 1772, what was left of Albany County was split into three parts, one remaining under the name Albany County. Tryon County contained the western portion (and thus, since no western boundary was specified, theoretically still extended west to the Pacific). The eastern boundary of Tryon County was approximately five miles west of the present city of Schenectady in the Mohawk River Valley, and the county included the western part of the Adirondack Mountains and the area west of the West Branch of the Delaware River. Tryon County was later divided to organize 37 distinct counties of New York State. The county was named for William Tryon, colonial governor of New York.

During and after the Revolution, most of the Loyalists in Tryon County fled to Canada. In 1784, following the peace treaty that ended the American Revolutionary War, Americans changed the name of Tryon County to Montgomery County to honor the general, Richard Montgomery, who had captured several places in Canada and died attempting to capture the city of Quebec. They replaced the name of the British governor.

In 1789, Montgomery County was reduced by the splitting off of Ontario County from Montgomery. The area taken from Montgomery County contained all of present-day Allegany, Cattaraugus, Chautauqua, Erie, Genesee, Livingston, Monroe, Niagara, Orleans, Steuben, Wyoming, Yates, and part of Schuyler and Wayne counties, as well as Ontario County.

After continued new settlement, in 1791 Herkimer County was one of three counties taken from Montgomery (the other two being Otsego, and Tioga County). It was much larger than the present Herkimer County, however, and was reduced by a number of subsequent splits.

In 1794, Herkimer County was reduced in size by the creation of Onondaga County. This county was larger than the current Onondaga County, including the present Cayuga, Cortland, and part of Oswego counties.

In 1798, Oneida County was created from another part of Herkimer County. This county was larger than the current Oneida County, as it included the present-day Jefferson (which extends along Lake Ontario), Lewis, and part of Oswego counties.

In 1805, Jefferson and Lewis counties were split off from Oneida. In 1816, parts of Oneida and Onondaga counties were taken to form the new Oswego County.

Together with Utica, Oneida county was the cultural centre of Welsh settlement in New York state. By the mid-nineteenth century, the lexicorapher John Russell Bartlett noted that the area had a number of Welsh language newspapers and magazines, as well as Welsh churches. Indeed Bartlett noted in his Dictionary of Americanisms that "one may travel for miles and hear nothing but the Welsh language". By 1855, there were four thousand Welshmen in Oneida.

In 1848, John Humphrey Noyes founded a religious and Utopian community, the Oneida Community, near Oneida. Its unconventional views on religion and relations between the sexes generated much controversy. The community lasted until 1881. The Oneida Silver Company was founded here to manufacture sterling silver, silverplate holloware and, later, stainless steel flatware.

== Geography ==
According to the U.S. Census Bureau, the county has a total area of 1,258 square miles (3,260 km^{2}), of which 1,212 square miles (3,140 km^{2}) is land and 45 square miles (120 km^{2}) (3.6%) is water.

Oneida County is in the central portion of New York State, east of Syracuse, and west of Albany. Oneida Lake is on the northwestern corner of the county, and the Adirondack Park is on the northeast. Part of the Tug Hill Plateau is in the northern part of the county. Oneida County's highest point lies neither on the plateau nor in the Adirondack Park, but in the county's southern extremity. The peak's name is Tassel Hill. It is located slightly southeast of Hardscrabble Road (Tassel Hill Road), between the villages of Waterville and Cassville.

The Erie Canal, completed in 1825, runs east–west along the Mohawk River through the county. It stimulated considerable trade and settlement. Oneida Lake and Oneida Creek form part of the western boundary.

In the early 21st century, Oneida is the only county in New York state documented as having Chronic wasting disease among its wild White-tailed deer.

=== Adjacent counties ===
- Lewis County – north
- Herkimer County – east
- Otsego County – southeast
- Madison County – southwest
- Oswego County – west

=== National protected area ===
- Fort Stanwix National Monument

=== State Forests ===
(New York State Forests)

- Albert J. Woodford State Forest
- Buck Hill State Forest
- Clark Hill State Forest
- South Hill State Forest
- Webster Hill State Forest

== Demographics ==
Historical population
Census	Pop.	Note	%±
1800	22,047		—
1810	33,792		53.3%
1820	50,997		50.9%
1830	71,326		39.9%
1840	85,310		19.6%
1850	99,566		16.7%
1860	105,202		5.7%
1870	110,008		4.6%
1880	115,475		5.0%
1890	122,922		6.4%
1900	132,800		8.0%
1910	154,157		16.1%
1920	182,833		18.6%
1930	198,763		8.7%
1940	203,636		2.5%
1950	222,855		9.4%
1960	264,401		18.6%
1970	273,037		3.3%
1980	253,466		−7.2%
1990	250,836		−1.0%
2000	235,469		−6.1%
2010	234,878		−0.3%
2020	232,125		−1.2%
2025 (est.)	226,392	▼	−2.5%
U.S. Decennial Census; 1790-1960 1900-1990; 1990-2000 2010-2020

=== 2020 census ===
Oneida County, New York – Racial and ethnic composition Note: the US Census treats Hispanic/Latino as an ethnic category. This table excludes Latinos from the racial categories and assigns them to a separate category. Hispanics/Latinos may be of any race.
Race / Ethnicity (NH = Non-Hispanic)	Pop 1980	Pop 1990	Pop 2000	Pop 2010	Pop 2020	% 1980	% 1990	% 2000	% 2010	% 2020
White alone (NH)	241,431	229,617	208,600	199,254	180,984	95.25%	91.54%	88.59%	84.83%	77.97%
Black or African American alone (NH)	7,588	12,638	12,937	13,682	14,989	2.99%	5.04%	5.49%	5.83%	6.46%
Native American or Alaska Native alone (NH)	383	462	488	499	508	0.15%	0.18%	0.21%	0.21%	0.22%
Asian alone (NH)	841	2,089	2,701	6,522	10,522	0.33%	0.83%	1.15%	2.78%	4.53%
Native Hawaiian or Pacific Islander alone (NH)	x	x	50	49	72	x	x	0.02%	0.02%	0.03%
Other race alone (NH)	604	226	242	244	729	0.24%	0.09%	0.10%	0.10%	0.31%
Mixed race or Multiracial (NH)	x	x	2,906	3,809	9,130	x	x	1.23%	1.62%	3.93%
Hispanic or Latino (any race)	2,619	5,804	7,545	10,819	15,191	1.03%	2.31%	3.20%	4.61%	6.54%
Total	253,466	250,836	235,469	234,878	232,125	100.00%	100.00%	100.00%	100.00%	100.00%

=== 2000 census ===
As of the census of 2000, there were 235,469 people, 90,496 households, and 59,184 families residing in the county. The population density was 194 inhabitants per square mile (75/km^{2}). There were 102,803 housing units at an average density of 85 units per square mile (33/km^{2}). The racial makeup of the county was 90.21% White, 5.74% African American, 0.23% Native American, 1.16% Asian, 0.02% Pacific Islander, 1.11% from other races, and 1.52% from two or more races. Hispanic or Latino of any race were 3.20% of the population.

21.7% were of Italian, 13.1% Irish, 12.1% German, 9.9% Polish, 8.5% English and 5.6% American ancestry according to self-identification of ethnic background in Census 2000. 90.6% spoke English, 2.7% Spanish, 1.3% Italian, 1.2% Serbo-Croatian and 1.1% Polish as their first language.

There were 90,496 households, out of which 30.40% had children under the age of 18 living with them, 49.10% were married couples living together, 12.00% had a female householder with no husband present, and 34.60% were non-families. 29.50% of all households were made up of individuals, and 13.10% had someone living alone who was 65 years of age or older. The average household size was 2.43 and the average family size was 3.02.

In the county, the population was spread out, with 23.90% under the age of 18, 8.60% from 18 to 24, 28.20% from 25 to 44, 22.90% from 45 to 64, and 16.50% who were 65 years of age or older. The median age was 38 years. For every 100 females there were 98.60 males. For every 100 females age 18 and over, there were 96.30 males.

The median income for a household in the county was $35,909, and the median income for a family was $45,341. Males had a median income of $32,194 versus $24,295 for females. The per capita income for the county was $18,516. About 9.80% of families and 13.00% of the population were below the poverty line, including 18.90% of those under age 18 and 8.50% of those age 65 or over.

== Government and politics ==
United States presidential election results for Oneida County, New York
Year	Republican / Whig		Democratic		Third party(ies)	
Year	No.	%	No.	%	No.	%
1828	5,817	53.11%	5,136	46.89%	0	0.00%
1832	5,991	48.30%	6,414	51.70%	0	0.00%
1836	3,621	39.80%	5,477	60.20%	0	0.00%
1840	7,156	46.73%	7,769	50.73%	390	2.55%
1844	6,983	44.07%	7,717	48.71%	1,144	7.22%
1848	6,032	41.50%	3,585	24.66%	4,919	33.84%
1852	7,832	44.72%	8,636	49.31%	1,044	5.96%
1856	11,174	58.32%	6,386	33.33%	1,601	8.36%
1860	12,508	58.13%	9,011	41.87%	0	0.00%
1864	12,048	52.46%	10,916	47.54%	0	0.00%
1868	12,593	52.76%	11,276	47.24%	0	0.00%
1872	13,384	56.95%	10,078	42.88%	40	0.17%
1876	14,019	51.90%	12,844	47.55%	147	0.54%
1880	14,546	52.82%	12,600	45.75%	393	1.43%
1884	13,790	48.06%	13,823	48.17%	1,083	3.77%
1888	16,241	51.78%	14,276	45.51%	851	2.71%
1892	14,359	48.36%	13,552	45.64%	1,783	6.00%
1896	18,855	60.81%	11,003	35.49%	1,149	3.71%
1900	19,204	57.93%	12,820	38.67%	1,128	3.40%
1904	19,243	55.66%	14,064	40.68%	1,264	3.66%
1908	19,346	54.59%	14,968	42.24%	1,123	3.17%
1912	11,245	33.39%	12,182	36.17%	10,249	30.43%
1916	18,813	52.54%	16,070	44.88%	922	2.58%
1920	36,311	66.27%	15,560	28.40%	2,920	5.33%
1924	37,545	61.82%	18,124	29.84%	5,065	8.34%
1928	44,782	52.82%	38,231	45.09%	1,773	2.09%
1932	41,193	50.76%	38,413	47.34%	1,542	1.90%
1936	46,317	50.84%	43,439	47.68%	1,355	1.49%
1940	52,362	51.47%	49,109	48.27%	271	0.27%
1944	48,749	50.08%	48,371	49.69%	224	0.23%
1948	46,755	47.90%	48,332	49.51%	2,526	2.59%
1952	69,652	60.98%	44,438	38.90%	134	0.12%
1956	80,178	69.83%	34,649	30.17%	0	0.00%
1960	59,513	48.39%	63,368	51.53%	100	0.08%
1964	39,737	35.10%	73,359	64.80%	114	0.10%
1968	52,875	50.96%	44,685	43.07%	6,201	5.98%
1972	78,549	69.86%	33,642	29.92%	253	0.23%
1976	57,655	54.40%	47,779	45.08%	554	0.52%
1980	51,968	49.59%	44,292	42.26%	8,539	8.15%
1984	65,377	60.38%	42,603	39.35%	289	0.27%
1988	55,039	53.20%	47,665	46.07%	757	0.73%
1992	43,806	40.43%	40,966	37.81%	23,570	21.76%
1996	37,996	40.03%	44,399	46.77%	12,534	13.20%
2000	47,603	49.58%	43,933	45.76%	4,474	4.66%
2004	52,392	54.93%	40,792	42.77%	2,197	2.30%
2008	49,256	52.20%	43,506	46.10%	1,603	1.70%
2012	44,530	51.36%	40,468	46.68%	1,702	1.96%
2016	51,437	56.52%	33,743	37.08%	5,829	6.40%
2020	57,860	56.73%	41,973	41.15%	2,163	2.12%
2024	60,687	60.20%	39,415	39.10%	712	0.71%

A board of supervisors governed Oneida County until 1962, when the county charter was changed to create a county executive and a 29-seat county legislature. The entire county elects the county executive. On January 1, 2014, the Oneida County Legislature was reduced to 23 seats. All 23 members are elected from single-member districts. Currently, there are 17 Republicans and 6 Democrats.

Oneida County Executives
Name	Party	Term
Charles T. Lanigan	Republican	January 1, 1963 – December 31, 1966
Harry S. Daniels	Republican	January 1, 1967 – December 31, 1967 (interim); January 1, 1968 – December 31, 1973
William E. Bryant	Democratic	January 1, 1974 – April 21, 1979
Antoinette Hyer	Democratic	April 22, 1979 – May 2, 1979 (acting)
Seymour Greene	Democratic	May 3, 1979 – June 1979 (interim)
Michael Nasser	Democratic	June 1979 – December 31, 1979 (interim)
Sherwood L. Boehlert	Republican	January 1, 1980 – December 31, 1982
John D. Plumley	Republican	January 1, 1983 – January 13, 1991
Raymond A. Meier	Republican	January 14, 1991 – December 31, 1991 (interim); January 1, 1992 – December 31, 1996
Ralph J. Eannace Jr.	Republican	January 1, 1997 – May 2003
Joseph A. Griffo	Republican	May 2003 – December 31, 2003 (interim); January 1, 2004 – December 31, 2006
Anthony J. Picente Jr.	Republican	January 1, 2007 – present

Oneida County Board of Legislators
District	Legislator	Title	Party	Residence
1	Keith Schiebel		Republican	Vernon
2	Colin Idzi		Republican	Oriskany Falls
3	Norman Leach		Republican	Camden
4	Cynthia Rogers-Witt		Republican	Rome
5	Michael B. Waterman		Republican	Camden
6	Steven R. Boucher		Republican	Remsen
7	Gerald J. Fiorini	Chairman	Republican	Rome
8	Richard A. Flisnik		Republican	Marcy
9	David Buck		Republican	Deerfield
10	George E. Joseph	Majority Leader	Republican	Clinton
11	Robert Koenig		Republican	Oriskany
12	Kenneth White		Republican	Rome
13	Christopher L. Newton		Republican	Whitesboro
14	Chad Davis		Democratic	Clinton
15	Caroline Gable Reale		Democratic	New Hartford
16	Mary Austin Pratt		Republican	New Hartford
17	Stephen DiMaggio		Republican	Ava
18	Jeffery E. Daniels		Republican	Utica
19	Timothy Julian	Minority Leader	Democratic	Utica
20	Evon M. Ervin		Democratic	Utica
21	Tony Myers		Republican	Utica
22	Maria McNiel		Democratic	Utica
23	Anthony C. Leone		Democratic	Utica

Oneida County also leans Republican in major statewide and national elections. The last Democratic presidential nominee to carry Oneida County was Bill Clinton in 1996, by plurality. The last Democrat to win a majority in the county was Lyndon Johnson in his 1964 landslide. In 2008, Republican John McCain won the county by 6,000 votes out of 90,000 cast. He won all municipalities in the county except the city of Utica and the town of Kirkland. In 2012, Republican Mitt Romney won the county by even fewer votes, by around 4,000 plus votes. Republican Donald Trump returned the county to its reliably red roots, posting strong victories in 2016, 2020, and 2024.

== Economy ==
The main product of Oneida County was once silverware, chiefly manufactured at Oneida Ltd.'s headquarters in Sherrill. In January 2005, the company ceased manufacturing their product, closing its main plant and selling its assets. The factory, under new ownership, continues to produce American-made silverware under the Liberty Tabletop brand.

Currently the largest non-governmental, non-healthcare product of Oneida County is gambling. Turning Stone Casino Resort is an enterprise of the Oneida Indian Nation of New York, and the largest private employer in Oneida County.

== Education ==
Tertiary

- Hamilton College
- Mohawk Valley Community College
- Oneida Institute (defunct)
- State University of New York Polytechnic Institute
- Utica University

Public school districts

- Adirondack Central School District
- Brookfield Central School District
- Camden Central School District
- Central Square Central School District
- Clinton Central School District
- Holland Patent Central School District
- Madison Central School District
- Mount Markham Central School District
- New Hartford Central School District
- New York Mills Union Free School District
- Oneida City School District
- Oriskany Central School District
- Poland Central School District
- Remsen Central School District
- Rome City School District
- Sauquoit Valley Central School District
- Sherrill City School District
- Stockbridge Valley Central School District
- Utica City School District
- Waterville Central School District
- Town of Webb Union Free School District
- West Canada Valley Central School District
- Westmoreland Central School District
- Whitesboro Central School District

State-operated schools

- New York State School for the Deaf

== Communities ==
=== Cities ===
- Rome
- Sherrill
- Utica (county seat)

=== Towns ===
- Annsville
- Augusta
- Ava
- Boonville
- Bridgewater
- Camden
- Deerfield
- Florence
- Floyd
- Forestport
- Kirkland
- Lee
- Marcy
- Marshall
- New Hartford
- Paris
- Remsen
- Sangerfield
- Steuben
- Trenton
- Vernon
- Verona
- Vienna
- Western
- Westmoreland
- Whitestown

=== Villages ===
- Boonville
- Camden
- Clayville
- Clinton
- Holland Patent
- New Hartford
- New York Mills
- Oneida Castle
- Oriskany
- Oriskany Falls
- Remsen
- Sylvan Beach
- Vernon
- Waterville
- Whitesboro
- Yorkville

=== Census-designated places ===
- Barneveld
- Bridgewater
- Chadwicks
- Clark Mills
- Durhamville
- Hamilton College
- Lake Delta
- Marcy
- North Bay
- Otter Lake
- Prospect
- Stittville
- Verona
- Washington Mills
- Westernville
- Westmoreland
- White Lake

=== Hamlets ===
- Blossvale
- Cassville
- Deansboro
- Jewell
- Lee Center
- Lower South Bay
- McConnellsville
- Point Rock
- Sauquoit
- Taberg
- Vernon Center
- Verona Mills

== Notable locations ==
- Fort Stanwix
- Oriskany Battlefield State Historic Site
- Steuben Memorial State Historic Site

== See also ==
- List of counties in New York
- List of New York State Historic Markers in Oneida County, New York
- National Register of Historic Places listings in Oneida County, New York
- Oneida, New York, a city in Madison County
- Oneida Community, a former religious community
- Boonville-Oneida County Fairgrounds
