= 1973 New York City gravediggers' strike =

Labor action in United States

- Date: April 12 – July 6, 1973 (2 months and 24 days)
- Location: New York metropolitan area (Note: The struck cemeteries were all located in the state of New York, in New York City, Nassau County, Suffolk County, and Westchester County.)
- Caused by: Disagreements over the terms of a new labor contract
- Methods: Picketing; Strike action; Walkout
- Result: Union and cemeteries agree to a new three-year contract with a new pension plan and yearly wage increases of $12 per week for the union members

Parties
Cemetery Workers and Greens Attendants Union Local 365, Service Employees International Union (SEIU)	47 cemeteries in the New York metropolitan area

Lead figures
Sam Cimaglia	

In 1973, approximately 1,700 gravediggers at 47 cemeteries in the New York metropolitan area went on strike due to disagreements over the terms of a new labor contract. The strike, which initially only affected Cypress Hills Cemetery, began on April 12 and had spread to every cemetery whose workers were represented by the Cemetery Workers and Greens Attendants Union Local 365 by June 10. Within a month of this, on July 6, the strike ended after the union and cemetery management agreed to a new contract that included wage increases and a new pension plan.

Following a strike in 1970, Local 365 had negotiated a three-year contract with the management of 47 cemeteries in the metropolitan area that was set to expire on December 31, 1972. This date passed without a replacement due to disagreements over the terms of the contract, with the union seeking weekly wage increases of $12 in each year of the contract, among other benefits regarding pension plans and insurance policies. In January 1973, the union voted to authorize strike action. Over the next several months, negotiations continued with little success. On April 12, the union officially began a strike against Cypress Hills Cemetery in Brooklyn, and, by the end of the month, the strike had spread to three cemeteries in the region.

On June 10, the strike spread to all 47 cemeteries. Several days later, Governor Nelson Rockefeller issued a state executive order mandating that the union and cemeteries seek mediation and, possibly, binding arbitration. On June 20, Attorney General Louis J. Lefkowitz began to take legal action to end the strike. Local President Sam Cimaglia defied court orders to end the strike, but on July 6, the union and cemeteries came to an agreement that saw an immediate end to the strike, with the gravediggers receiving their requested wage increases and a new pension plan. Discussing the strike in 2021, labor journalist Kim Kelly said that the gravediggers' action was emblematic of a renewed labor militancy that was seen in the United States during the 1970s.

== Background ==
=== Organized labor among New York City's gravediggers ===
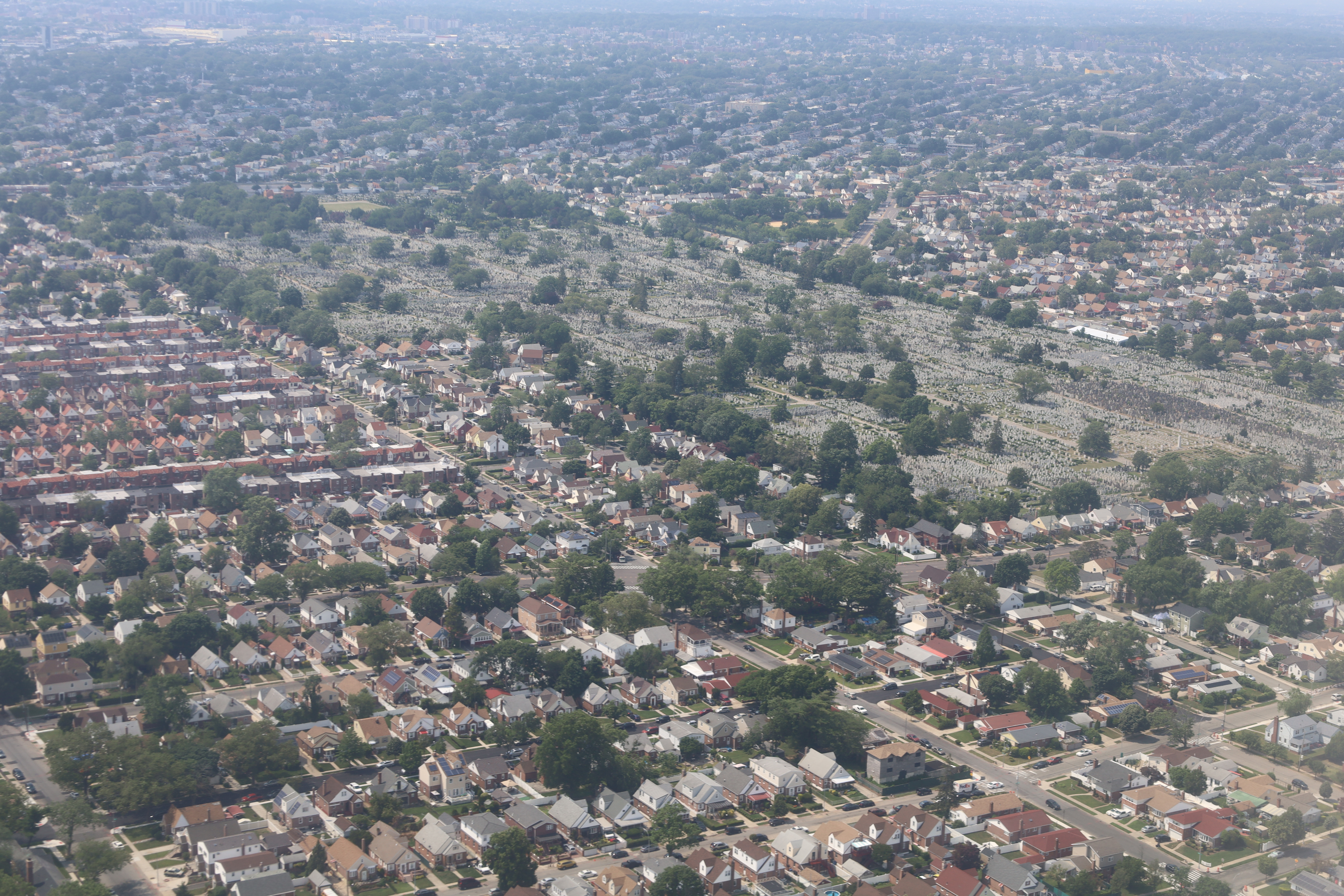
Aerial view of Montefiore Cemetery, a Jewish cemetery in Queens, 2021

In the 1970s, cemetery workers at 47 cemeteries in the New York metropolitan area, (Note: These cemeteries were all located in the state of New York, in New York City, Nassau County, Suffolk County, and Westchester County.) consisting of gravediggers and mechanics, were unionized under Local 365 of the Cemetery Workers and Greens Attendants Union, an affiliate union of the Service Employees International Union of the AFL-CIO. Gravediggers in the area had engaged in several labor disputes with the management of the various cemeteries they worked at throughout the 20th century, such as with the 1949 Calvary Cemetery strike, where about 250 workers went on strike against the trustees of St. Patrick's Cathedral. In January 1970, Local 365 began an eight-week strike that affected all 47 cemeteries and prevented the burial of roughly 15,000 bodies. While the burial of Orthodox Jews was allowed by the union due to Jewish religious law requiring the burial of a body within one day after their death, the burials themselves were not performed by the striking gravediggers. During the strike, the corpses were kept in storage, primarily in vaults or in coffins, though some bodies were kept under tents in the struck cemeteries. According to journalist Michael Kramer of the magazine New York, the strike only ended after "a thaw threatened decomposition in hundreds of bodies stacked irreverently above ground".

=== Contract negotiations ===
In 1972, the existing labor contract between the local union, which by this point represented about 1,700 workers, and the cemeteries (represented by four employer bargaining groups) (Note: The cemeteries were divided into the following bargaining groups: those operated by the Roman Catholic Archdiocese of New York were represented by one bargaining group, the cemeteries operated by the Roman Catholic Diocese of Brooklyn were in another, all Jewish cemeteries were in their own group, and all Protestant and nonsectarian cemeteries were grouped into one group.) was set to expire on December 31, and there were disagreements between the two sides over the terms of the replacement contract, primarily regarding pay. At the time, gravediggers earned a minimum weekly pay of $168 and mechanics made $192. The union was seeking a weekly pay increase of $36 over the course of the three-year contract, with $12 increases in each of the three years. However, the cemeteries management rebuffed the offer and instituted proposed a $15 increase, with a $4 increase the first year, $5 the following year, and $6 in the final year. The union was also seeking improvements to the workers' dental and medical insurance policies and a 100 percent increase in their pension plans, which at the time gave out a monthly payment of $125 for workers who had exceeded 25 years of service. John Egan, the president of one of the cemeteries and a spokesperson for all of the cemeteries' managements, said regarding the union's demands, "[it] would represent a 50 per cent increase in wages and benefits in the first year alone".

On December 31, the existing contract expired, and beginning on January 2, 1973, the cemetery workers began to work without a replacement contract in place. The following day, approximately 600 union members attended a meeting at the Roosevelt Auditorium in Manhattan's Union Square and voted to authorize a strike action against the 47 cemeteries. However, Local President Sam Cimaglia stated that he did not expect a strike in the immediate future and instead planned to submit the union's final set of demands directly to cemetery management in order to secure individual settlements with each cemetery.

=== Union alleges a lockout ===
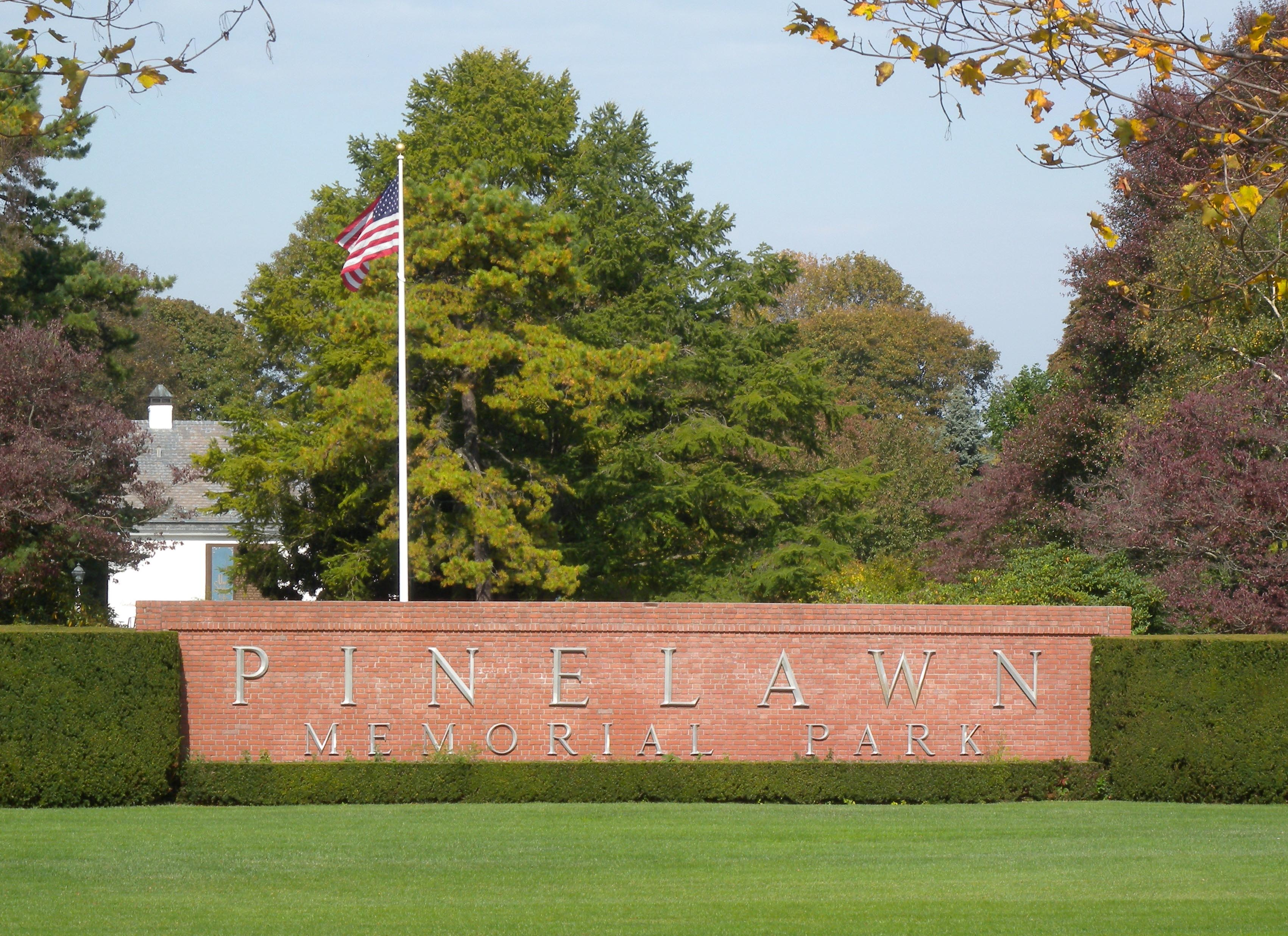
On January 14, Pinelawn Memorial Garden and Cemetery (pictured 2009) engaged in what the union considered a lockout.

On January 14, Pinelawn Memorial Garden and Cemetery on Long Island announced in an advertisement that they would be temporarily halting burials and would instead be storing bodies in their mausoleum on a temporary basis in response to the union's decision to authorize a strike. Alfred Locke, the president of the cemetery, described the decision as a "temporary layoff", though Cimaglia described the cemetery's actions as a "lockout" and announced that picketing at the cemetery would commence the following day.

On February 13, about 120 union members protested outside of the Manhattan offices of New York Governor Nelson Rockefeller at 22 West 55th Street to seek help from the governor in resolving the labor dispute. Covering the event, The New York Times reported that the cemetery owners involved in the dispute said that before they could make any promises regarding the union's demands for pay increases, they would need assurances from the state government that they could increase the amount they could charge for burials, since the cemeteries would need permission from the New York State Department of State's Division of Cemeteries to raise their rates. The following month, the New York State Board of Mediation appointed a special mediator, Hugh Sheridan, to oversee the labor dispute. Sheridan had previously been involved in resolving the 1970 labor strike. By April, The New York Times reported that negotiations on a new contract were "stalled".

== Course of the strike ==
=== Strikes against select cemeteries ===
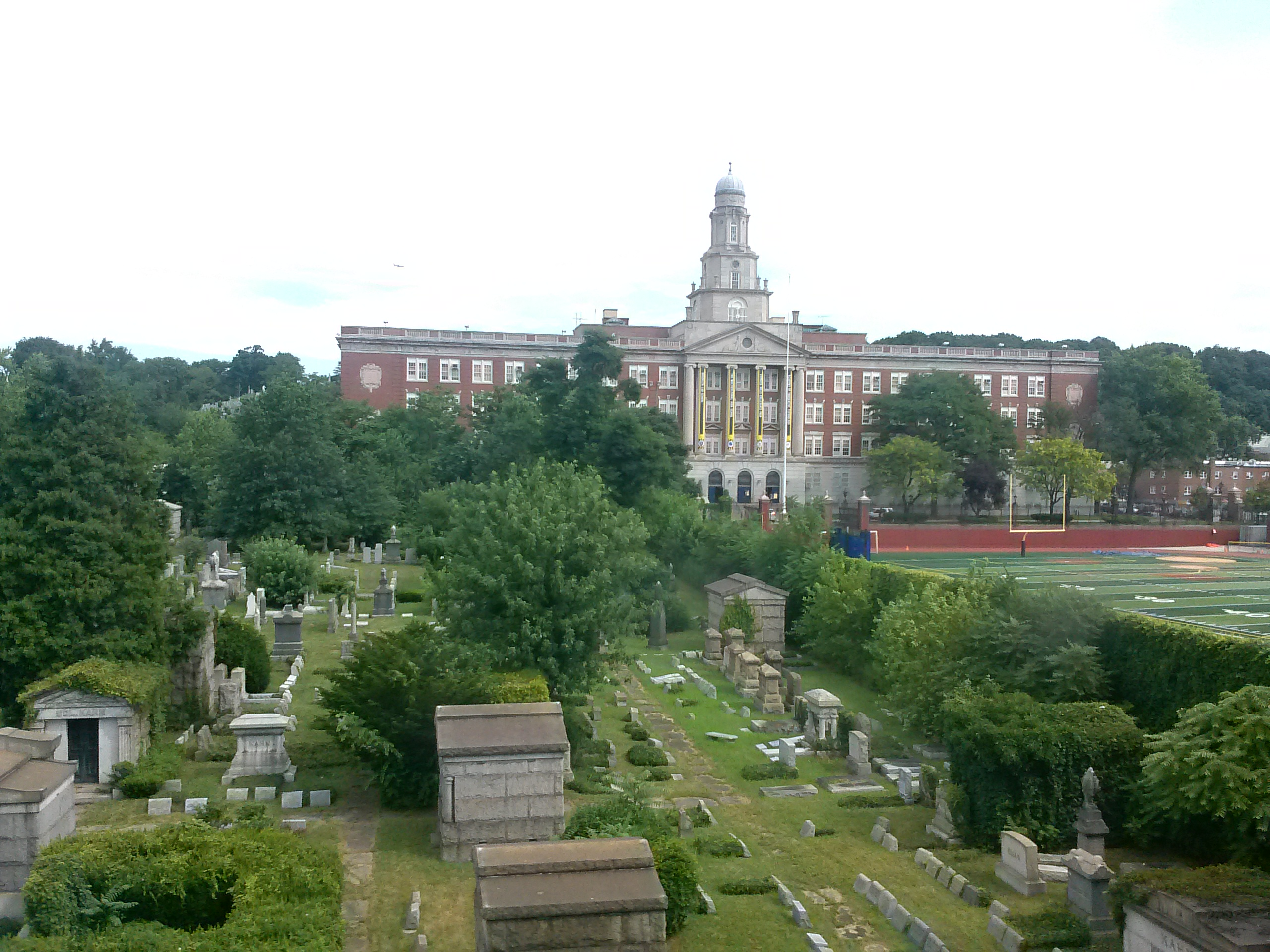
On April 12, the union began to strike against Cypress Hills Cemetery in Brooklyn (pictured 2013).

On April 11, the union's executive board voted to begin strike action against the Cypress Hills Cemetery in Brooklyn starting at 8 a.m. the next day, a move that affected 60 workers at the cemetery. The following week, on April 20, the union expanded their strike action by calling for a walkout of all 25 gravediggers working at Mount Ararat Cemetery in Farmingdale, and the following day, the union threatened to expand the strike further by targeting St. John's Roman Catholic Cemetery in Queens. By April 24, the workers at St. John's were involved in the strike, and by the end of the month, two picketers at the cemetery were arrested for attempting to block a funeral in a protest that was ultimately broken up by the police. By this time, there were 49 unburied bodies in storage at Cypress Hills, 14 at St. John's, and an undisclosed number at Mount Ararat. On April 27, Cimaglia stated that a strike affecting all 47 cemeteries was impending, and the following day, he announced that a meeting would be scheduled in the next few days to discuss plans for this action.

=== Board of inquiry ===
In mid-April, New York State Industrial Commissioner Louis L. Levine created a board of inquiry to investigate the labor dispute. On April 18, this three-man board, headed by former New York City Deputy Mayor Robert W. Sweet, met with representatives from both the cemeteries and the union to see if a resolution could be reached and, if not, scheduled for a public hearing to take place on April 23. However, the walkout at Mount Ararat on April 20 prompted Sweet to order an immediate public hearing on the labor dispute that same day. Due to statements from Cimaglia indicating that he would not come otherwise, the board subpoenaed him, though Cimaglia ultimately chose to disregard his subpoena because of the absence of several negotiators representing cemetery management. On April 23, union officials walked out of the public hearings, with the legal counsel for the union stating that they would not participate in the hearings unless every employer from all of the 47 cemeteries were also present at the hearings. The counsel also challenged the board of inquiry to cite the union for contempt of court, saying he was prepared to have a review from the New York Supreme Court. Ultimately, the union refused to attend the board's formal hearings.

=== Governor advocates for possible binding arbitration ===
By the beginning of May, the board of inquiry was suggesting voluntary arbitration and possible action from the New York State Legislature in order to resolve the labor dispute. By May 19, Governor Rockefeller was advising the legislature to pass legislation that would allow the state government to invoke binding arbitration "if the current situation deteriorates". Per the terms of the proposed legislation, if the New York State Department of Health declared a public health emergency as a result of the strike, the state government would be able to mandate the State Board of Mediation to make a final mediation effort between the two sides and, if no agreement were reached within 48 hours, to invoke compulsory arbitration. By May 26, the bill had passed the New York State Senate and, the following day, it passed through the State Assembly. In opposition to the legislation, State Senator A. Frederick Meyerson said that the bill would "strike a mortal blow" to the rights of labor unions.

=== Strike spreads to all cemeteries ===
By early June, the strike against the three cemeteries had been going on for about 7 weeks and had idled 160 union members. However, on June 7, Cimaglia announced that, following a meeting of Local 365's executive board, the strike would be expanded to affect all 1,700 union members at all 47 cemeteries on June 10 unless an agreement were reached. By June 9, an agreement between the union and cemeteries had still not been reached, and that night, Cimaglia announced that a full walkout of all affected cemeteries would begin the following morning. According to The New York Times, the walkout could possibly leave as many as 300 bodies unburied per day.

On June 10, the strike expanded to all 47 cemeteries, including Mount Hebron Cemetery (pictured 2026).

On Sunday, June 10, the strike spread to the remaining 44 cemeteries in the metropolitan area. At Mount Hebron Cemetery in Queens, 22 graves were dug a day prior in preparation for the anticipated work stoppage there. At the Jewish cemeteries affected, which hold burials on Sundays unlike the Roman Catholic and many of the nonsectarian and Protestant cemeteries, many of the friends and families of the deceased engaged in digging and burying the bodies, with the allowance but not assistance of the striking gravediggers. Additionally, mourners took to driving the hearses carrying the bodies of the deceased to their graves, as many of the professional hearse drivers, who were unionized with the International Brotherhood of Teamsters, refused to cross the gravediggers' picket lines. In response to the strike, local rabbi Samuel Schrage announced the formation of a volunteer committee to assist in Jewish burials in the city.

=== Strike continues ===
At the time the strike spread to all cemeteries, the legislation that would have allowed for the government to impose binding arbitration was awaiting Governor Rockefeller's signature to become law, and at the time, health officials noted that, due to the high-capacity cold storage facilities present at many of the cemeteries, there was not an immediate concern that the strike would result in a public health emergency at that time. However, on June 11, Rockefeller signed the bill into law. By June 12, a manager at Cypress Hills Cemetery stated that the cemetery had 267 bodies in storage and had the capacity to hold more, but that many smaller cemeteries could struggle to handle an influx of cadavers in storage. Additionally, the New York City Department of Health announced the formation of a special committee to investigate storage conditions at the struck cemeteries and to help coordinate corpse storage.

On June 12, Pinelawn Cemetery received a temporary restraining order from Federal Judge Orrin Grimmell Judd mandating that the 48 striking gravediggers at their site return to work, citing a previous no-strike agreement that the union had had with the cemetery which the management said was violated by Local 365. In response, Cimaglia stated that, while the union had had that agreement in place with the cemetery, the situation had changed with the expansion of the strike on June 10 and that, ultimately, the union would not obey the restraining order. On June 14, the department of health stated that, after a review of the facilities in place around the city, the struck cemeteries had a remaining storage capacity for 11,641 bodies in cold storage, which, at the current rate of cadaver storage, equaled out to about 57 days before there would be no more storage. However, cemetery management rebuffed these figures by pointing out that the storage space was not spread out equally among all affected cemeteries and that the striking gravediggers refused to allow for the transportation of bodies from one cemetery's storage area to another.

=== Governor Rockefeller issues executive order ===
By June 15, the state department of health, along with the state industrial commissioner, certified that the strike had become "an actual threat to the health and welfare of residents", and later that day, Governor Rockefeller signed a state executive order under the provisions of the recently passed legislation that mandated a 48-hour period of mediation between the union and cemetery management. In response to this, Cimaglia stated that the union would not abide by any possible binding arbitration imposed via the government and said he would rather "go to jail" than see a return to work under those terms. Earlier that same day, Federal Judge John R. Bartels threatened the union with a charge of contempt of court if the workers at Pinelawn Cemetery did not obey the previous court mandate ordering them to return to work. Following the governor's order, the State Board of Mediation announced that the 48 hours of mediation would occur between 10 a.m. on June 18 to 10 a.m. on June 20. By June 19, however, Vincent D. McDonnell, the chairman of the Board of Mediation, stated that the discussions had stalled due to the union's unwillingness to budge from their demands for yearly raises of $12 per week over the 3-year length of the contract.

=== Labor dispute goes to binding arbitration ===
Ultimately, the mediation efforts ended without an agreement being reached between the two parties. As a result, on June 20, New York State Attorney General Louis J. Lefkowitz issued an order to show cause on behalf of the union for why their strike should not be enjoined to cease. By this time, almost 1,000 bodies in the metropolitan area were awaiting burial. Ultimately, Lefkowitz sought a court order to require the gravediggers to return to work, which was granted by New York Supreme Court Justice Abraham J. Gellinoff after he ruled against the union's argument that the legislation mandating the binding arbitration was unconstitutional. However, Cimaglia remained adamant that the union would not obey the court order, maintaining that he was willing to go to jail for contempt. However, the union did agree to the court's order for workers at Pinelawn Cemetery to return to work, reducing the total number of struck cemeteries to 46.

By June 23, the city health department stated that 1,010 bodies were awaiting burial at the struck cemeteries, with two already at storage capacity, but that space existed for an additional 11,060 cadavers. Also by this time, many volunteer groups had begun performing burials at various cemeteries, with St. John's Cemetery reporting that 789 burials had been performed since the beginning of the strike and the Diocese of Brooklyn reporting an additional 240 burials at three other cemeteries in their jurisdiction. Concerning the contempt of court charges against the union leaders, Judge Arthur Markewich of the New York Supreme Court, Appellate Division granted a stay of proceedings on June 25 pending a hearing later that week. The following day, a brief fracas broke out on the picket line at Mount Hebron Cemetery between strikers and a man trying to enter the cemetery to dig a grave, prompting both sides to file assault charges against the other.

=== End of the strike ===
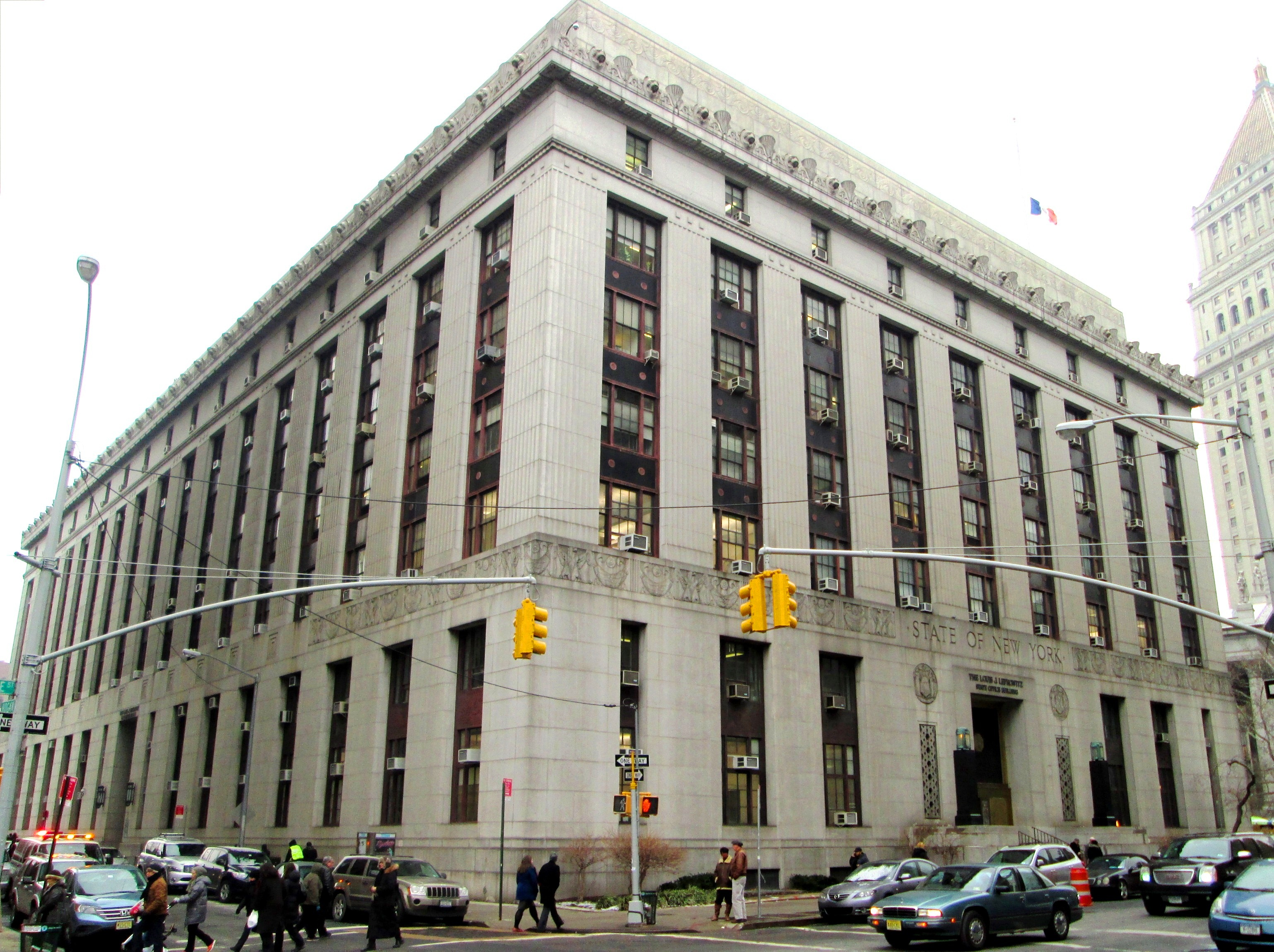
On June 25, the special panel in charge of arbitration for the dispute met at 80 Centre Street (pictured 2013).

On June 25, the special panel created for arbitration, which was chaired by Donald B. Straus, held a procedural meeting at 80 Centre Street in Manhattan and planned for a hearing on July 9 to take testimony under oath from the parties involved in the labor dispute. Additionally, on June 28, the New York Supreme Court, Appellate Division upheld the lower court ruling requiring the gravediggers to return to work. This allowed for Attorney General Lefkowitz to begin pursuing criminal charges against the union and its leadership, though Cimaglia stated that he intended to appeal the court's decision in the New York Court of Appeals. However, on July 4, the Court of Appeals upheld the order. Additionally, one day prior, Cimaglia had been found guilty of contempt by New York Supreme Court Justice Nathaniel T. Helman and sentenced to several days in jail, with the sentence to begin later that week. (Note: Sources differ on the exact length of Cimaglia's jail sentence, with articles from The New York Times giving lengths of both ten days and thirty days.) Additionally, Cimaglia was charged a fine of $250 and the union a fine of $1,250.

On July 6, only a few hours before Cimaglia was scheduled to appear before Justice Helman and begin his jail sentence, the union agreed to a settlement with the cemetery management that brought an immediate end to the strike. Union leadership agreed to call off the strike prior to an official ratification vote from the union rank and file, scheduled for July 8 at the Roosevelt Auditorium, as they felt assured that the settlement would be approved by the members. Regarding the terms of the agreement, the union was able to secure pay increases of $12 per week for each of the three years of the contract's life and the creation of a supplemental pension plan that would be paid for by the cemetery management. Cimaglia stated that he was "elated" with the settlement, which he said accomplished "75 percent" of what the union had initially sought in the new contract. Given the breakthrough in negotiations, Justice Helman postponed sentencing of Cimaglia until July 10 and stated that the resolution of the strike would be taken into consideration at that time. Concerning the backlog of burials, which the city health department estimated was approximately 1,400 bodies in the city proper alone, Cimaglia stated that the gravediggers would begin burials "as rapidly and as dignified as possible".

== Aftermath ==
On July 10, Justice Helman sentenced Cimaglia to 20 days in prison for defying the court order to cease striking, reducing the sentence from the originally expected thirty days due to Cimaglia's actions in ending the strike. However, on July 13, shortly before he was to begin his sentence, the New York Supreme Court, Appellate Division ordered a stay on his sentence awaiting a hearing scheduled for August 6 for a further delay.

In 1976, following the expiration of the contract agreed to in 1973, a strike was threatened by Local 365, but was ultimately postponed following intervention from McDonnell, who advocated for continued discussions with the cemetery management. A similar situation occurred amidst contract negotiations in early 1982. Concerning the labor militancy of these gravediggers and Local 365 during this time, labor journalist Kim Kelly wrote in 2021 that, "The 1970s were a busy era for labor activism, and gravediggers were no exception".

== Sources ==
- Kramer, Michael (January 8, 1973). "Future Shocks: The 1973 Crisis Calendar". New York. 6 (2): 56–57.
