= Main–Broad–Grove Streets Historic District =

Historic district in New York, United States

- U.S. National Register of Historic Places
- U.S. Historic district
- Location within New York Location within the United States
- Location: Roughly bounded by Main, Broad, E. Grove, W. Grove, Wilbur, Elizabeth, E. Walnut, W. Walnut, and Stone Sts., Oneida, New York
- Coordinates: 43°5′11″N 75°38′47″W
- Area: 82 acres (33 ha)
- Built: 1830
- Architect: Multiple
- Architectural style: Late 19th And 20th Century Revivals, Late Victorian
- NRHP reference No.: 83001705
- Added to NRHP: September 15, 1983

Main–Broad–Grove Streets Historic District is a national historic district located at Oneida in Madison County, New York. The district contains 194 contributing buildings, including Cottage Lawn and the Farnam Mansion. It is predominantly residential in character but includes two schools, five churches, and one park. It has a collection of residential types and styles from the 1830s to 1930s.

It was added to the National Register of Historic Places in 1983.
