= Farnam Mansion =

- U.S. Historic district – Contributing property
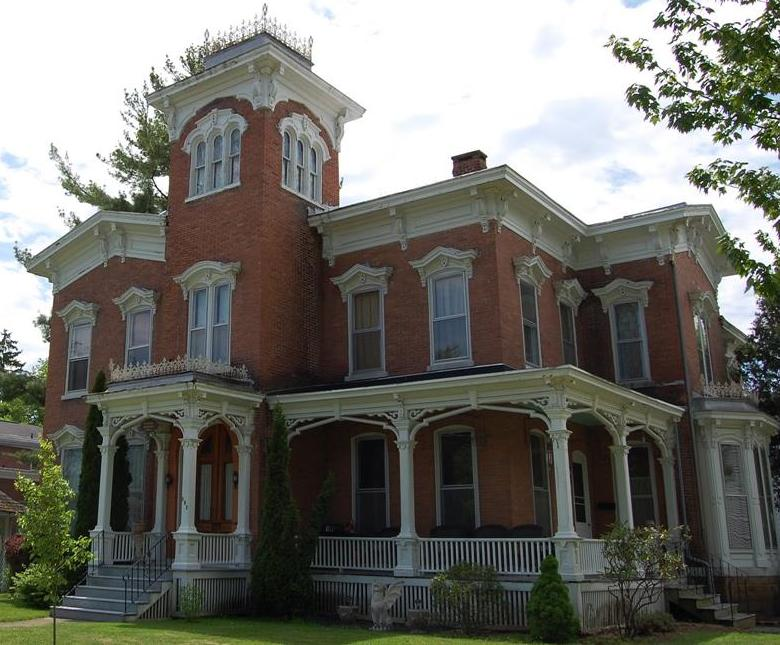
- The Farnam Mansion in Oneida, New York

- Location within New York Location within the United States
- Location: 302 Main Street, Oneida, New York
- Coordinates: 43°5′28.9494″N 75°38′59.514″W
- Area: less than one acre
- Built: 1862
- Architectural style: Italianate
- Part of: Main-Broad-Grove Streets Historic District (ID83001705)
- Added to NRHP: September 15, 1983

The Farnam Mansion is a 19th-century mansion in Oneida, New York, United States. Built circa 1862, it is situated on the southwest corner of Main and Stone Streets within the city's Main-Broad-Grove Streets Historic District, which was listed on the National Register of Historic Places in the year 1983.

== Architecture ==
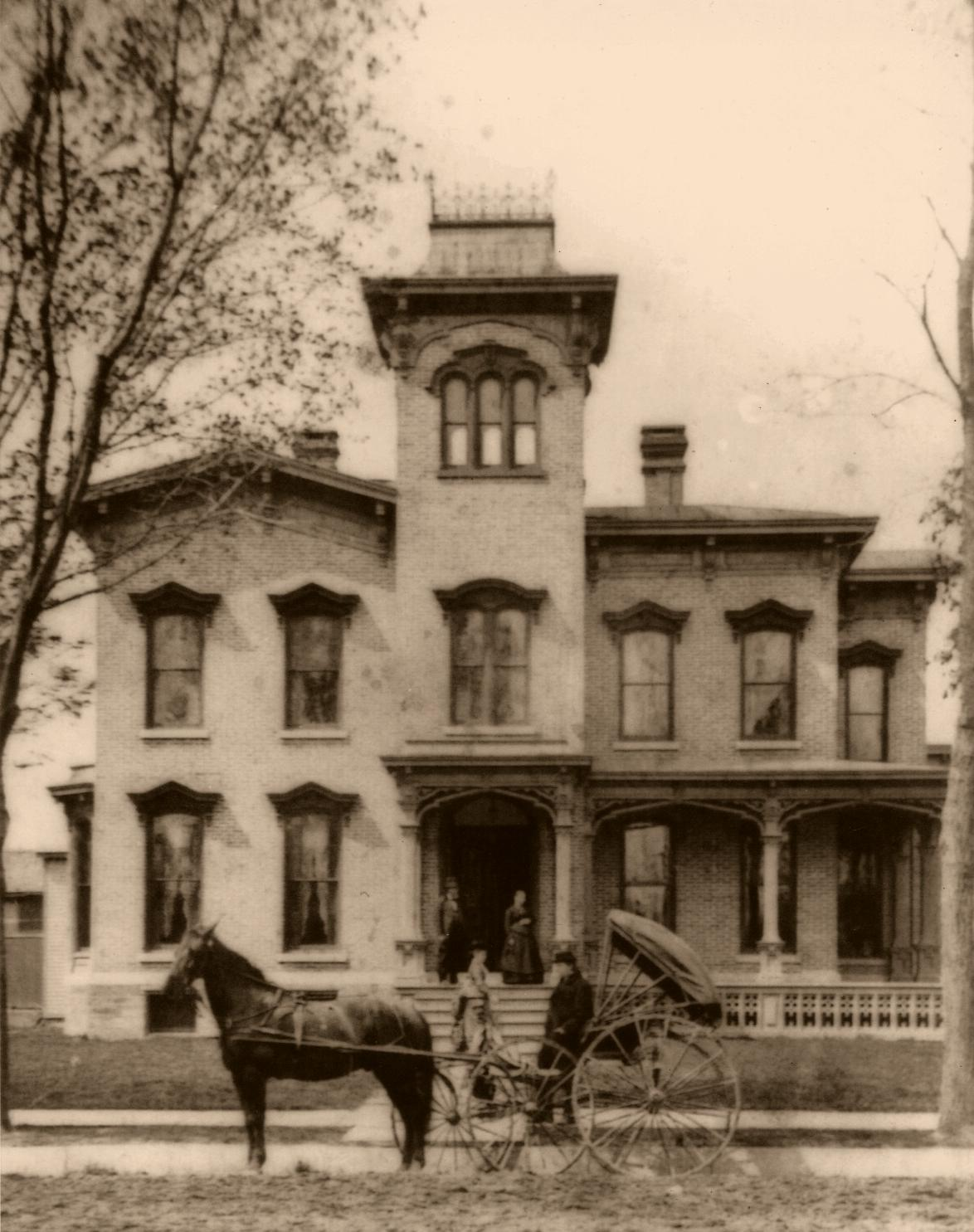
The Farnam Mansion - circa 1880

Constructed in the Italianate style, the mansion's exterior features a low-pitched roof, projecting eaves supported by large decorative cornice brackets, tall windows with ornate pediments, bay windows at the north and south sides of the house, and a wrap-around porch at the north and east sides. A square belvedere is situated above the east side of the mansion. It has a mansard roof and a trio of arched windows on all four sides. The front entry of the mansion features a pair of arched mahogany doors with windows, hand-carved panels, and rare ornamental bronze doorknobs made by the Metallic Compression Company of Boston, which feature a highly stylized dog's face and paws. The mansion's interior features eleven-foot high ceilings, ornate plaster ceiling medallions and crown mouldings, tall paneled tiger-oak doors, and two sets of paneled tiger-oak pocket doors. Three of the first floor rooms each contain a marble fireplace. The main parlor retains its original cut-crystal gasolier, which has never been converted to electricity, and an ornate pier mirror on a marble top base. A staircase leads to the second floor where there are four bedrooms, five bathrooms, a small library, nursery, and servant's quarters.

A black and white photograph (circa 1970s) showing the front of the Farnam Mansion appears on page 11 of the 1976 book, Country Roads - Madison County's Heritage: A Resource for the Future (Madison County Planning Board; Jennifer G.F. Solms and Paula A. Schoonmaker, editors). The photo's caption, which refers to the mansion as the "Farnam House" states that the builders "probably copied their design from the popular pattern books which published plans for the latest architectural styles." An uncaptioned black and white drawing of the mansion appears on page 8, and a paragraph describing some of the architectural details of "Oneida's Farnam House" appears on pages 130 and 131 in the Madison County Architecture section (by Brooks Stoddard.) An excerpt from the paragraph states that the mansion "features a tower topped by overhanging cornices supported by ornate brackets. Similarly, the windows are decorated with very heavy hood-moulds and cornices, details which add considerable richness to the building. Wrought iron designs of vines and flowers further enhance this effect." Stoddard also calls the mansion a prime example of the county's Italian Villa style of architecture which began circa 1850 as part of the Alexander Jackson Davis and Andrew Jackson Downing innovations.

== History ==
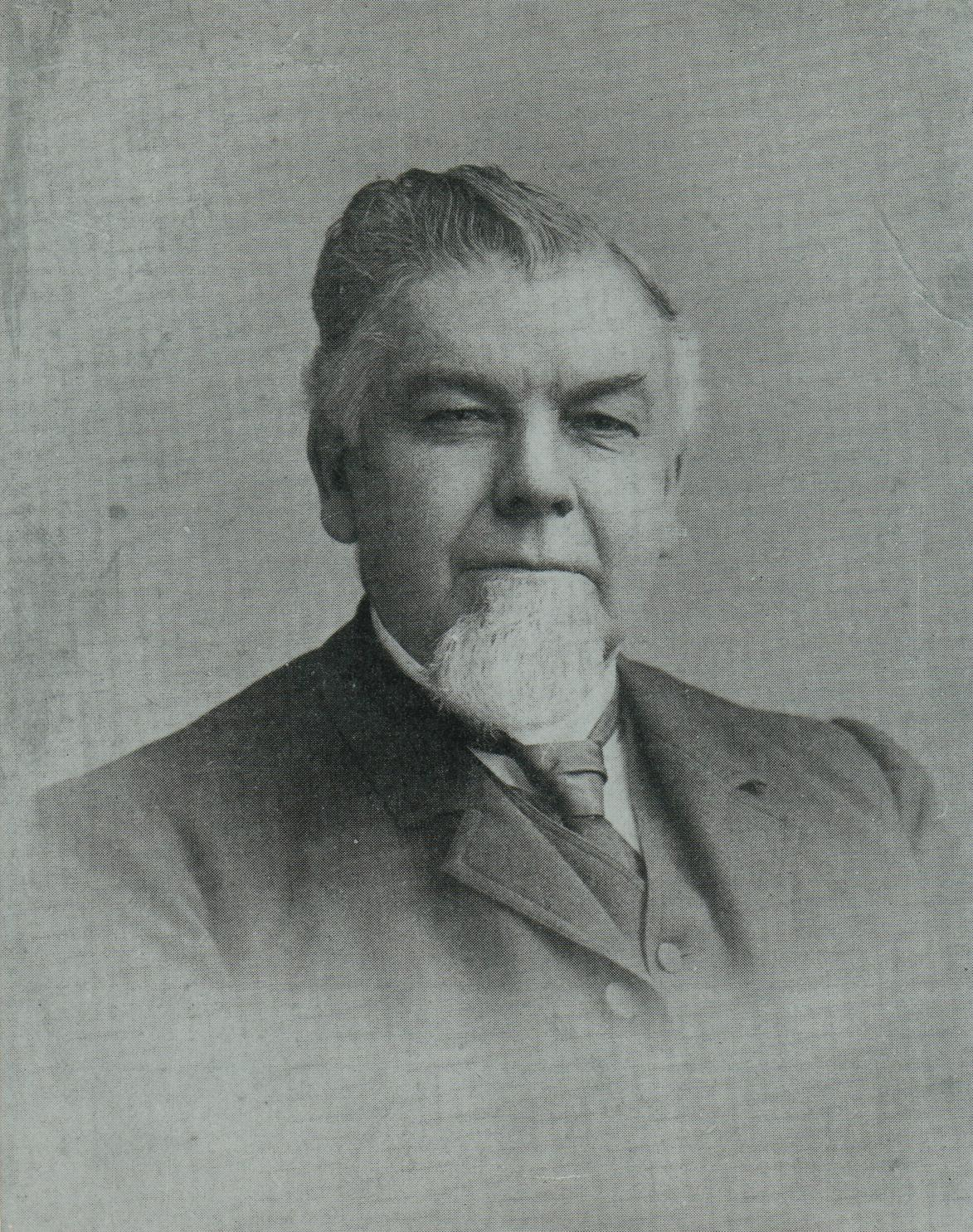
Stephen Head Farnam - circa 1882

The original owner of the mansion was a wealthy businessman named Stephen Head Farnam, after whom the house was named. In addition to being a successful hardware store owner and president of the National State Bank, Mr. Farnam was also a proprietor of the Little Falls Axe Factory, the president of the Glenwood Cemetery Association, and one of the organizers and first directors of the Oneida Gas Light Company. He died at home on November 17, 1897, after suffering a stroke. His obituary described him as "a well-known and highly esteemed citizen and merchant" of Oneida, and also "a self-made man and the architect of his own fortunes." (Other members of the Farnam family who have died in the mansion include Stephen's first wife, Elizabeth; their son Frederick James, who died of consumption in 1892 at the age of thirty-one; and Stephen's sister Sarah Robinson, who died after a week's illness of dysentery at the age of 80.)

In October 1913 Stephen Farnam's widowed second wife, Sarah, sold the mansion to Mary Dyer Jackson, an early activist in the women's suffrage movement. Miss Jackson, who founded the Progress Club in 1889 and became a charter member of the Madison County Historical Society in 1898, was well known on a regional scale for being the first woman in Central New York to circulate a petition asking the New York State Legislature to grant women the right to vote. Just five months after purchasing the mansion, Jackson sold the property and moved out.

In March 1914, Dr. Robert Lewis Crockett and his wife Mabel took ownership of the mansion. Dr. Crockett was a distinguished physician and surgeon who served as the 8th mayor of Oneida from 1916 to 1917 before leaving for military service in the first World War. He was also a naturalist who made a hobby of collecting wild plants and flower specimens, and was a member of three noted Syracuse University expeditions into Mexico, South America, and Canada. One of his favorite pastimes was taking field trips to the wilds of the Adirondacks to seek unusual plant specimens, many of which he brought back with him and studied in a laboratory set up in the basement of his home. It was down in this laboratory, while examining botanical specimens with his wife, that he was stricken with a fatal heart attack on May 27, 1946. His widow sold the mansion to Dr. Chancellor H. Whiting in 1952, who, in turn, sold it ten years later to Dr. William M. Hummer and his wife Shirley - both of whom died in the house in the 1980s.

The mansion was converted into a bed and breakfast by its next owners, the Chapins, who added four bathrooms and two rooms with Jacuzzi tubs to the bedrooms on the second floor. They lived in the house for eleven years until ill health forced them to retire from innkeeping. They sold the mansion to Todd Gioeli and his wife, who used it as a single-family rental property for a number of years. In 2010 the house changed hands again with Gerri Gray as the new owner.

== Deaths in the Farnam Mansion ==
Date	Name	Age	Cause of Death
1885 (Feb 17)	Elizabeth McChesney Farnam (first wife of S.H. Farnam)	62	undisclosed
1892 (Apr 13)	Frederick James Farnam (son of S.H. Farnam)	31	consumption
1897 (Nov 17)	Stephen Head Farnam (original owner of the mansion	75	apoplexy
1898 (Sep 04)	Sarah Robinson (sister of S.H. Farnam)	80	dysentery
1926 (Aug 27)	Frances Cornelia Crockett (mother of Dr. Robert Crockett)	82	undisclosed
1946 (May 27)	Dr. Robert L. Crockett (third owner of the mansion)	70	heart attack
1982 (Nov 06)	Shirley M. Gilkinson Hummer (wife of Dr. William Hummer	62	undisclosed
1984 (Sep 03)	Dr. William M.Hummer (fifth owner of the mansion)	67	colon cancer

== Current use ==
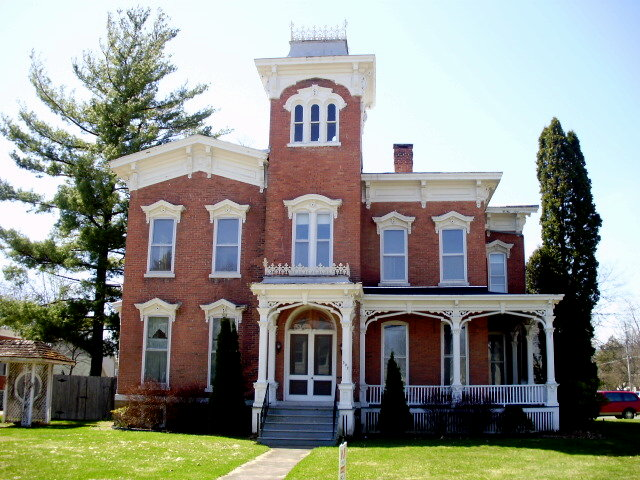
The Farnam Mansion

The Farnam Mansion is currently owned by writer and antique dealer Gerri Gray, who, along with her husband Brian, have painstakingly worked to renovate and restore the house to its former glory. Recent renovations to the mansion include a new back porch constructed in July 2014, a complete remodel of the first floor bathroom in January 2016, and exterior brick replacement on the front of the house in July 2016.

In 2010 they opened their doors to the public as a bed and breakfast called the Collinwood Inn. Themed after the 1960s gothic daytime drama, Dark Shadows, and decorated with antiques and various Dark Shadows memorabilia, the inn offered guests the choice of four rooms named after the television show's main characters: Barnabas, Angelique, Josette, and Quentin. In 2013 the bed and breakfast ceased operation, and all public events and guided tours of the mansion were discontinued. The house is now used as a single family dwelling, and the Grays occasionally host private paranormal investigations and seances there.

In 2023, a portion of the house was converted into a family-run antiques and collectibles shop called Victorian Lady Antiques. It opened its doors to the public on June 3rd of that year.
