= William Haugaard =

American architect (1889–1948)

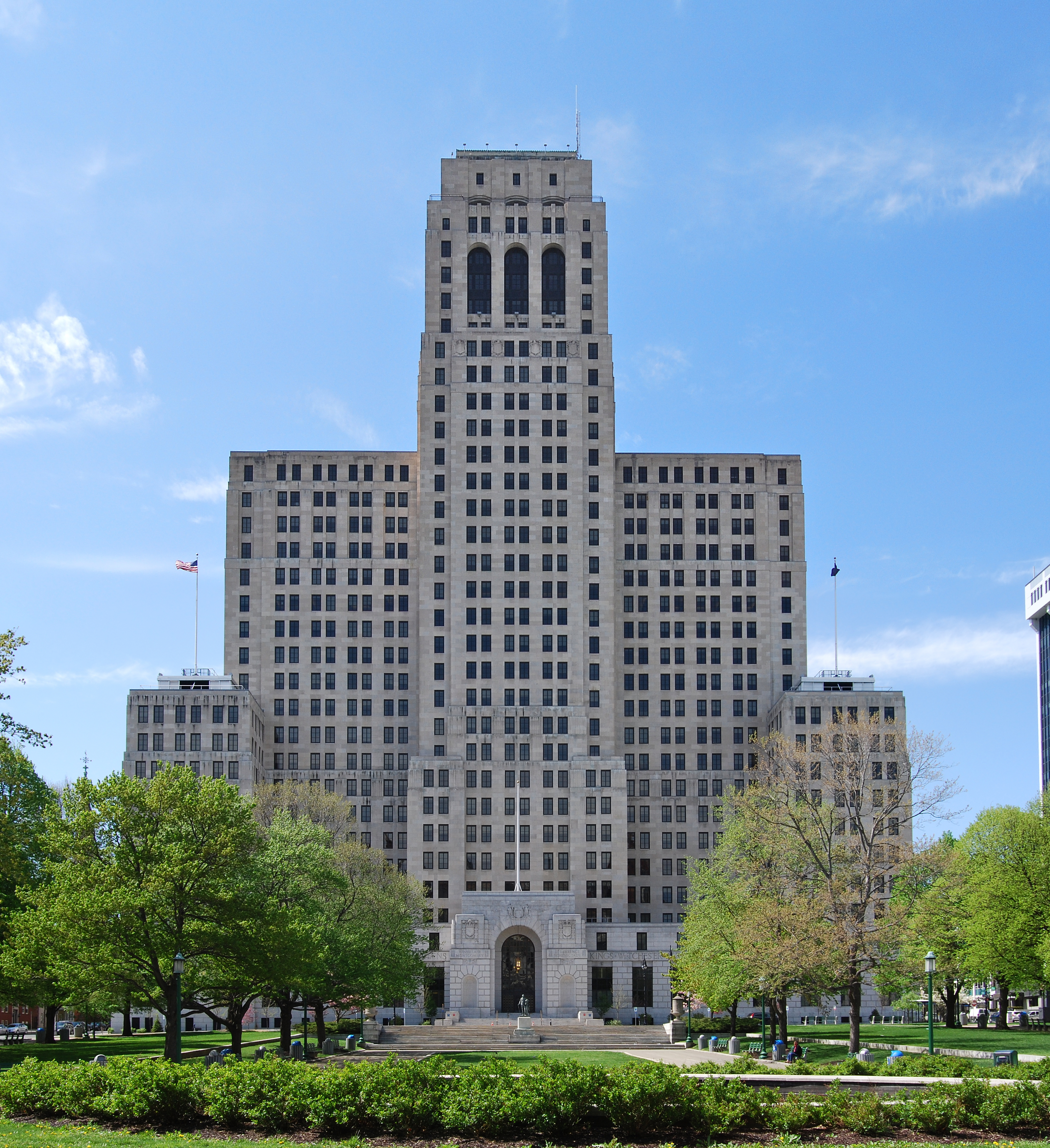
Alfred E. Smith Building

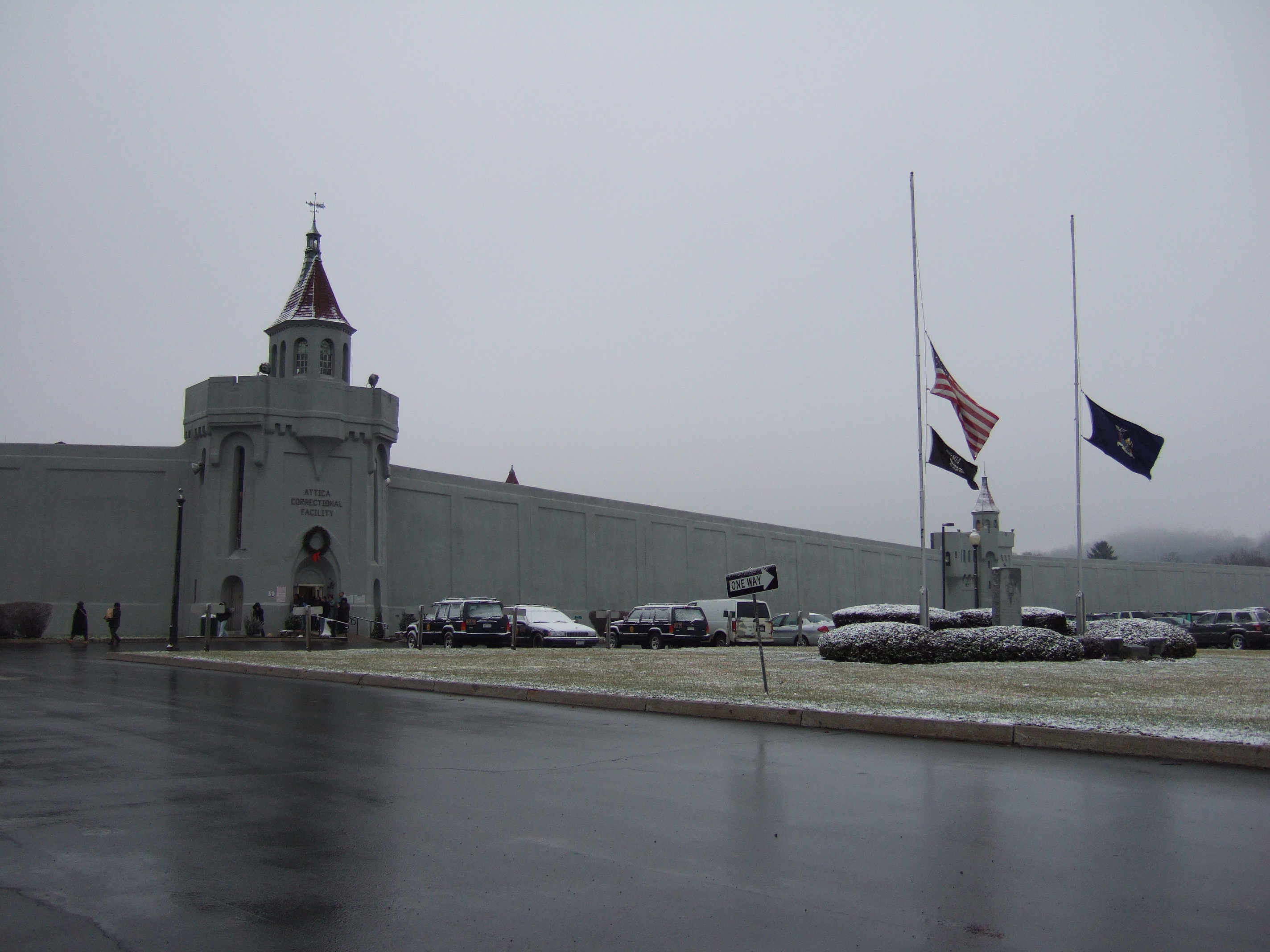
Attica State Prison

William E. Haugaard (1889 – September 1948) was an American architect who served as the State Architect for the State of New York from 1928 to 1944. A number of his works have been listed on the National Register of Historic Places.

== Life ==
Haugaard obtained degrees from the School of Architecture at Pratt Institute in 1908 and later studied at the Massachusetts Institute of Technology. From 1913 to 1918, he worked in Panama and designed a number of buildings in the Canal Zone, and assisted in design of the Gorgas Hospital. From 1920 to 1928, he was a member of the firm of Haugaard & Burnham in New York City.

In February 1928, Haugaard was appointed as the State Architect for the State of New York. He served as state architect from 1928 until 1944 and designed numerous state office buildings, prisons, hospitals, and schools, including Attica State Prison. His works included a dozen armories during that period.

Haugaard resigned as state architect in January 1944, after 16 years of service. Haugaard announced at the time that he sought to return to a private architecture practice. At the time of his resignation, Haugaard estimated that $250 million of the State of New York's $450 million investment in public buildings had been expended during his 16 years in office.

In 1947 he became chief of planning for the New York City Housing Authority.

For many years, Haugaard lived in Munsey Park, New York.

== Works ==
Haugaard designed the Theodore Roosevelt Memorial Building that is part of New York's American Museum of Natural History. He designed the Alfred E. Smith Building in Albany, New York.

A number of his works are listed on the U.S. National Register of Historic Places.

=== Selected works ===
- Attica State Prison
- Binghamton Armory, built 1932-1934
- Masten Avenue Armory (Buffalo), built 1932-1933
- New York State College of Human Ecology Martha Van Rensselaer Hall, built 1933, 116 Reservoir Ave, City of Ithaca, Tompkins, New York
- Corning Armory, built 1935-1936, at 127 Centerway, Corning, New York, NRHP-listed
- Green Haven State Prison, Poughkeepsie, New York
- Halloran General Hospital, later known as Willowbrook State School, Staten Island
- Hawkins Hall, Beekman St., Plattsburgh, New York
- Jamestown Armory, 1932, at 34 Porter Ave., Albany, New York, NRHP-listed
- Kingstown Armory, 1932
- Louis J. Lefkowitz Building (80 Centre Street)
- Newburgh Armory, 1932
- Oneida Armory, 1930, 217 Cedar St., Oneida, New York, NRHP-listed
- Peekskill Armory, 1932
- Schenectady Armory, 1936, 125 Washington Ave., Schenectady, New York, NRHP-listed
- Syracuse Armory, 1941-1943
- Transit Authority Headquarters (1951), 370 Jay Street, Brooklyn, originally Board of Transportation Building (William E. Haugaard & Andrew J. Thomas).
- Utica Armory, 1930, 1700 Parkway Blvd. E., Utica, New York, NRHP-listed
- Ticonderoga Armory, 1935, at 315 Champlain Ave., Ticonderoga, New York, NRHP-listed
- Alfred E. Smith Building, Albany, New York
