= Oneida Armory =

- U.S. National Register of Historic Places
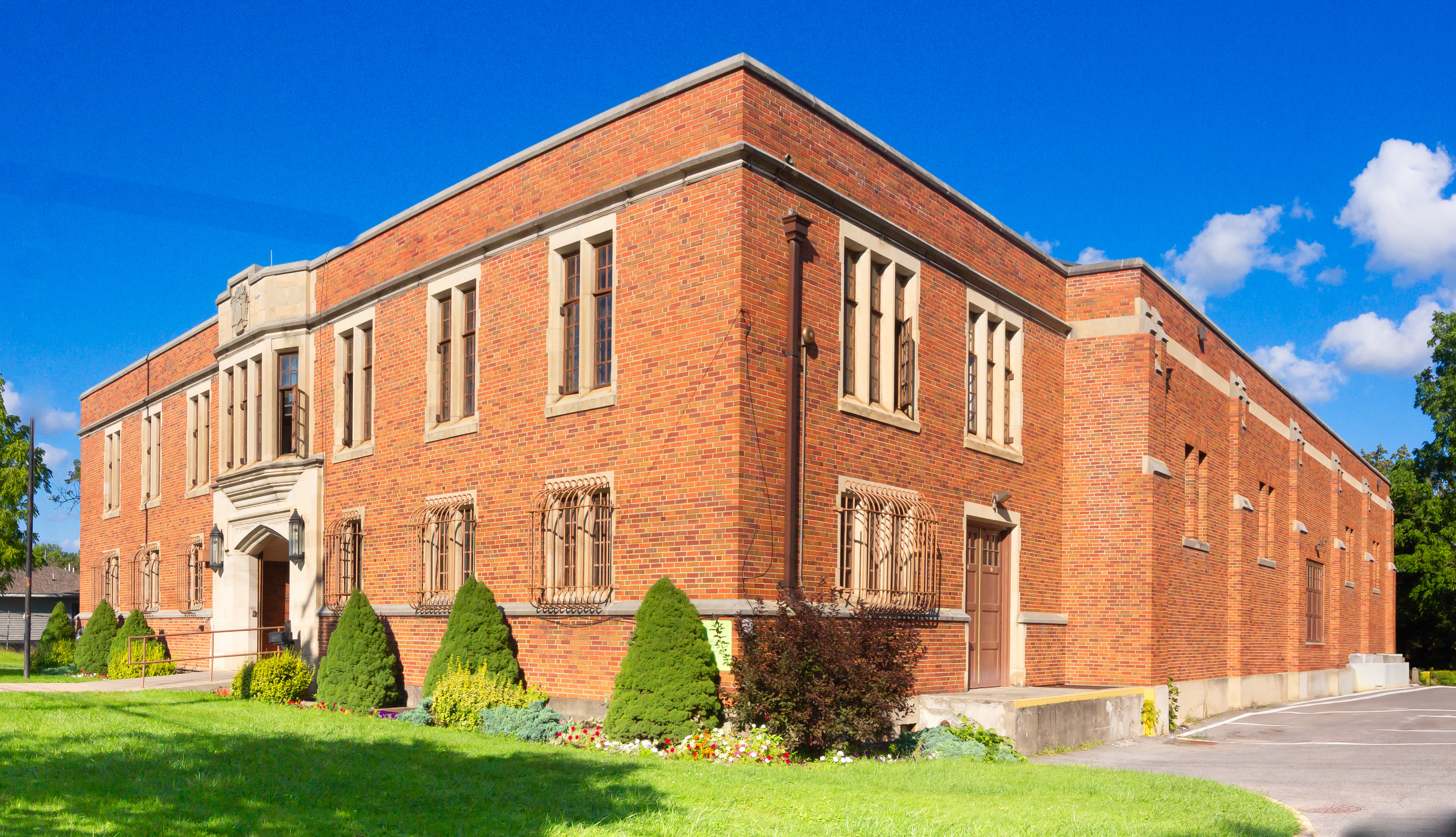

- Location within New York Location within the United States
- Location: 217 Cedar St., Oneida, New York
- Coordinates: 43°5′36″N 75°39′1″W
- Area: 2.1 acres (0.85 ha)
- Built: 1930
- Architect: Haugaard, William
- Architectural style: Tudor Revival
- MPS: Army National Guard Armories in New York State MPS
- NRHP reference No.: 95000084
- Added to NRHP: March 2, 1995

Oneida Armory is a historic National Guard armory building located in Oneida in Madison County, New York. It is a structural steel frame with brick curtain walls, built in 1930. It was designed by state architect William Haugaard. It consists of a two-story administration building with an attached 2 1/2-story drill shed. The administrative building features Tudor-inspired features such as a stone water table and a brick parapet with a stone cornice and stone coping encircling the building.

It was listed on the National Register of Historic Places in 1995.
