= Corning Armory =

- U.S. National Register of Historic Places
- New York State Register of Historic Places
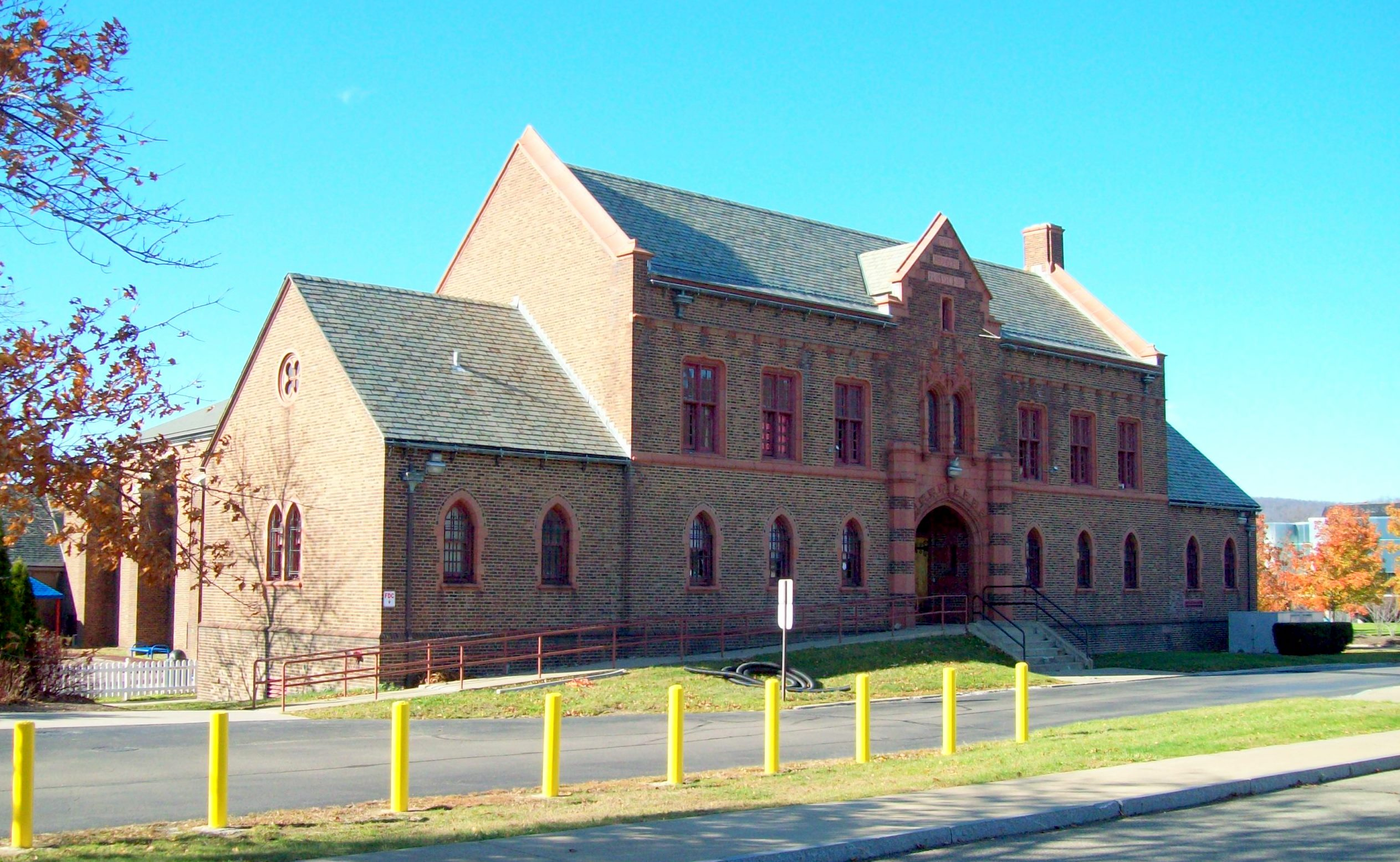
- Former Corning Armory, November 2010

- Location within New York Location within the United States
- Location: 127 Centerway, Corning, New York
- Coordinates: 42°8′54″N 77°3′16″W
- Area: 6.3 acres (2.5 ha)
- Built: 1934
- Architect: Haugaard, William
- Architectural style: Gothic Revival
- MPS: Army National Guard Armories in New York State MPS
- NRHP reference No.: 03000411
- NYSRHP No.: 10140.000874

Significant dates
- Added to NRHP: May 18, 2003
- Designated NYSRHP: March 25, 2003

Corning Armory, since 1977 home to the Corning YMCA, is a historic National Guard armory building located at Corning in Steuben County, New York. It was designed by architect William Haugaard. The historic, main block of the armory is a T-shaped Gothic Revival edifice with terra cotta trim constructed in 1934. The front portion, the former administration building, is a two-story, seven-bay structure flanked by two one-and-a-half-story wings. The rear section is the former drill shed.

It was listed on the National Register of Historic Places in 2003.
