= Mount Hope Reservoir =

- U.S. National Register of Historic Places
- Location within New York Location within the United States
- Location: Between Mt. Hope and Fairview Aves., Oneida, New York
- Coordinates: 43°3′34″N 75°38′47″W
- Area: 64.1 acres (25.9 ha)
- Built: 1883
- Architect: Warner, Judson W., Engineer
- Architectural style: Reservoir
- NRHP reference No.: 97000981
- Added to NRHP: August 29, 1997

Mount Hope Reservoir is a historic reservoir located in Oneida in Madison County, New York. It includes three contributing sites and four contributing buildings. It was developed between 1883 and 1906 and served as the original source of water for drinking, fire protection, and industrial needs for Oneida. It was all but abandoned by the city in 1979.

It was listed on the National Register of Historic Places in 1997.

The 65-acre (0.26 km^{2}) reservoir property is now a city park, and features hiking trails, fishing, mountain biking, cross-country skiing, and camping.
