= Hawkins Hall =

- U.S. National Register of Historic Places
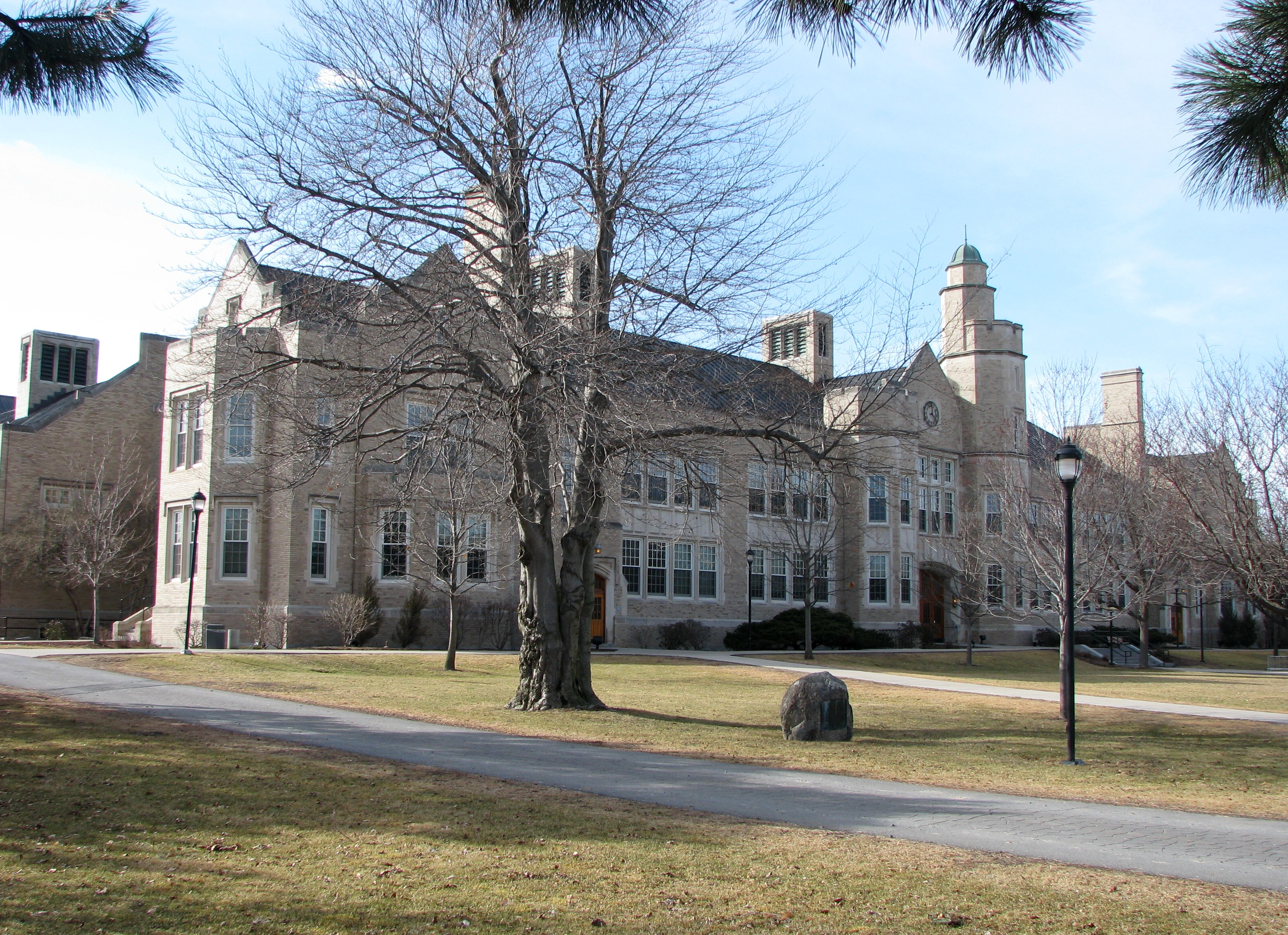
- Hawkins Hall, March 2012

- Location within New York Location within the United States
- Location: Beekman St., Plattsburgh, New York
- Coordinates: 44°41′50″N 73°28′4″W
- Area: 2 acres (0.81 ha)
- Built: 1932
- Architect: Haugaard, William E.; Brown, Thomas C.
- Architectural style: Late Gothic Revival
- MPS: Plattsburgh City MRA
- NRHP reference No.: 82001106
- Added to NRHP: November 12, 1982

Hawkins Hall is a historic institutional building located on the campus of State University of New York at Plattsburgh at Plattsburgh in Clinton County, New York, USA. It was designed by the state architect William E. Haugaard and built in 1932. It is a two-story stone structure with five-story and two-story towers in the Late Gothic Revival style. The entrances feature large wooden paneled doors with semi-circular transoms. It was built for the state Normal School at Plattsburgh to replace a structure destroyed by fire in 1929. It is named for Dr. George Hawkins, who was principal of the Normal School from 1898 to 1932, in 1955.

It was listed on the National Register of Historic Places in 1982.

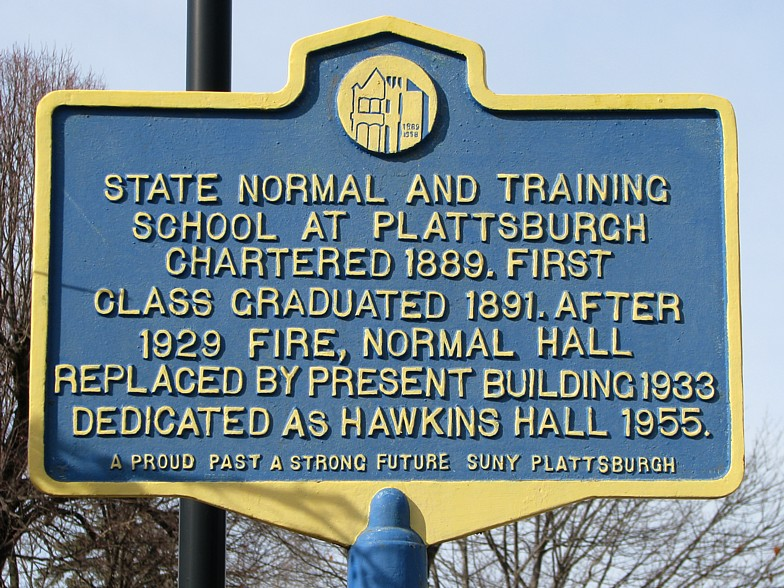
Historic plaque in front of Hawkins Hall

== Renovation ==
Following its Construction in 1932, Hawkins did not undergo any substantial renovation for almost 60 years. The building fell into disrepair as the center of campus shifted southward towards the Angell College Center, Kehoe Administration Building and the new Feinberg Library. It was not until the early 1990s that any action was taken to help preserve and renovate the building. The project was undertaken in two stages. Phase I, begun in the summer of 1991, focused on the exterior of the building. This phase was followed by phase II, which focused on the renovation of the interior of the building and was begun in early 1997. Construction was undertaken in two stages. First the west side of the building was renovated, followed by comparable renovations being undertaken on the east side. These renovations also included work on the ventilation and heating systems in the building, the courtyards, and the E. Glenn Giltz Auditorium. The work on the building was completed six months ahead of schedule in early 1999. Hawkins has not undergone another major renovation since the completion of that project in 1999.

While the main building has not undergone a major renovation since 1999, the adjacent pond recently underwent a major renovation. The man made pond has existed since the construction of the original building in 1889, and had undergone several changes in the 125 years. The most recent renovation effort was substantial and changed the area around the pond as well. The liner of the pond was replaced and now allows the pond to be filled year round, allowing for ice skating in the winter months. The pond was given a new waterfall, and a floating fountain to complement its new liner. A new wetland area of the pond which can be used for academic study was also created. The area around the pond was ringed with stone from local quarries and the landscaping in the area seeks to "emulate the Adirondacks and Lake Champlain."

== Usage ==
Following the completion of the renovation Hawkins hall began to enjoy a great deal more attention. While prior to renovations Hawkins' class space had been underutilized, upon completion of renovations the building saw the number of students making use of its space increase markedly. It is now home to 6 different academic programs and the college's honors program. The building has grown into a hub for students as it is home to numerous classes and the only dining facilities on the north side of the campus.
