= United States Post Office (Oneida, New York) =

- US Post Office--Oneida
- U.S. National Register of Historic Places
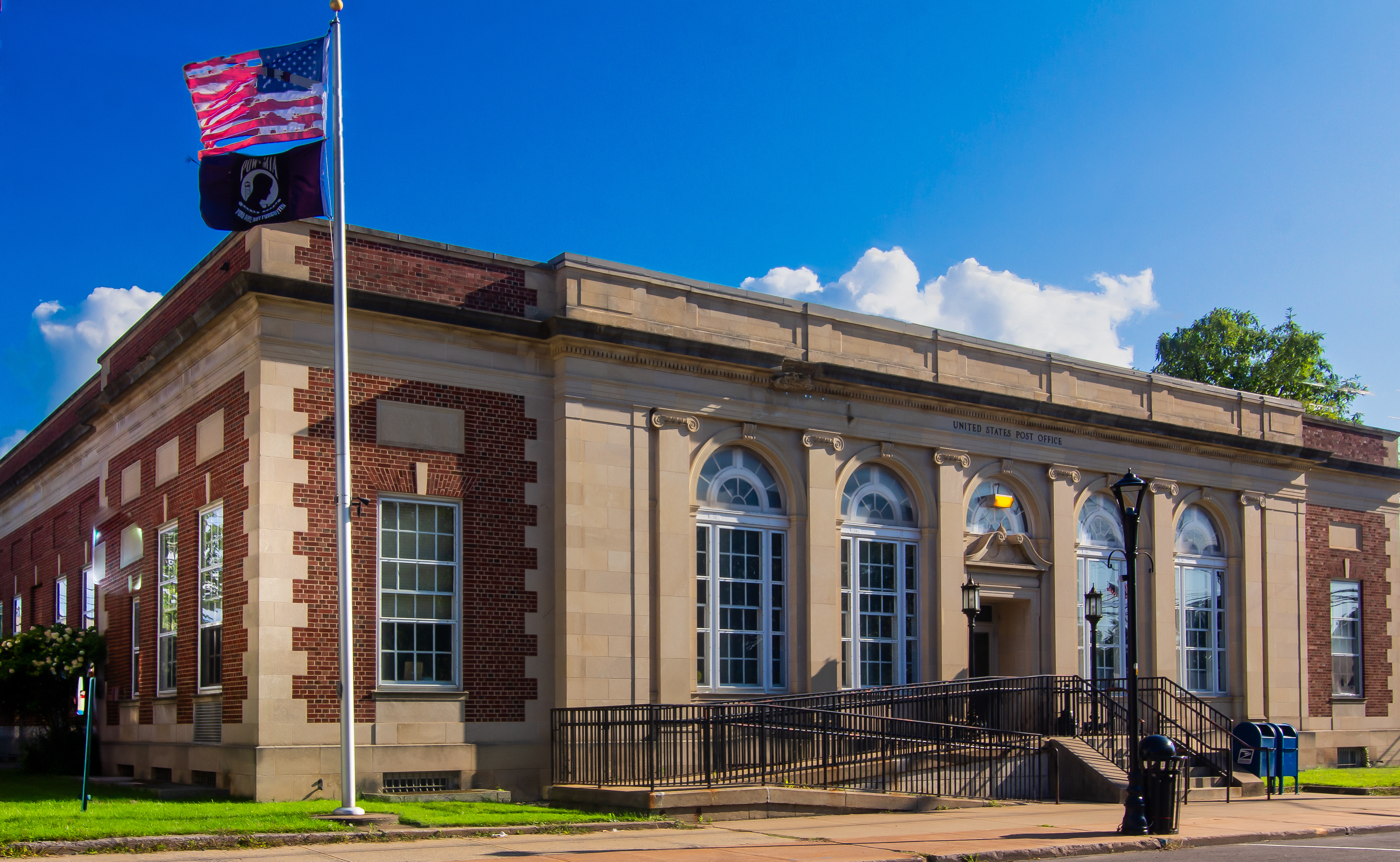

- Location within New York Location within the United States
- Location: 133 Farrier Ave., Oneida, New York
- Coordinates: 43°5′39″N 75°39′12″W
- Area: less than one acre
- Built: 1931
- Architect: Wetmore, James A.; US Treasury Department
- Architectural style: Colonial Revival
- MPS: US Post Offices in New York State, 1858-1943, TR
- NRHP reference No.: 88002390
- Added to NRHP: May 11, 1989

US Post Office-Oneida is a historic post office building located at Oneida in Madison County, New York, United States. It was designed and built in 1931, and is one of a number of post offices in New York State designed by the Office of the Supervising Architect of the Treasury Department, James A. Wetmore. It is a one-story, seven bay wide building in the Colonial Revival style. The five central bays are faced with limestone and limestone trim appears throughout the design.

It was listed on the National Register of Historic Places in 1988.
