= Jamestown Armory =

- U.S. National Register of Historic Places
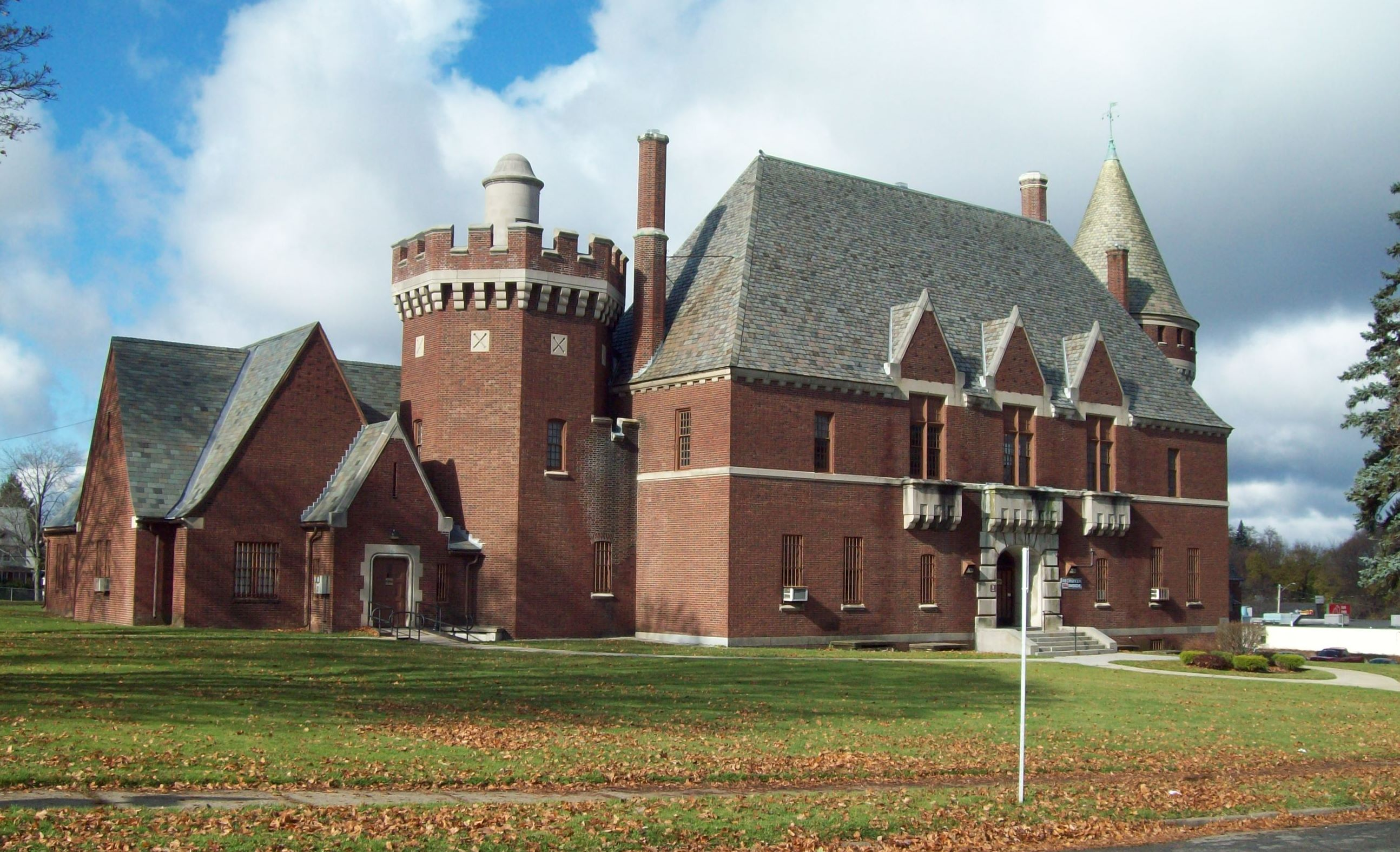
- Jamestown Armory, November 2010

- Location within New York Location within the United States
- Location: 34 Porter Ave., Jamestown, New York
- Coordinates: 42°5′35″N 79°15′18″W
- Built: 1932
- Architect: Haugaard, William
- Architectural style: Tudor Revival
- MPS: Army National Guard Armories in New York State MPS
- NRHP reference No.: 94001542
- Added to NRHP: January 12, 1995

Jamestown Armory is a historic National Guard armory building located at Jamestown in Chautauqua County, New York. It was built in 1932 for Company E, 174th Infantry Brigade. It consists of a Tudor Revival-style administration building with an attached drill shed. It is one of 12 extant armory buildings designed by State architect William Haugaard.

It was listed on the National Register of Historic Places in 1995.
