= Alfred Marcy =

Alfred Russell Marcy
- Born: July 21, 1900; Oneida, New York, U.S.
- Died: May 19, 1977 (aged 76); Melbourne, Florida, U.S.
- Military career
- Allegiance: United States of America
- Branch: United States Army
- Service years: 31 years
- Rank: Colonel
- Commands: 3rd Battalion, 108th Infantry; XO 54th Infantry Brigade, 27th Div; Signal Officer HQ X Corps FECOM
- Conflicts: World War II; Eastern Mandates; Southwest Pacific; Western Pacific; Korean War
- Awards: Legion of Merit (2); Bronze Star; Air Medal

Alfred Russell Marcy (July 21, 1900 – May 19, 1977) was a United States Army colonel who was the Chief of the Radio Division and Deputy Signal Officer of the Central Pacific command during World War II. During the Korean War, he was specifically selected to become signal officer by General Edward Almond of the U.S. Army X Corps for the Inchon landings and operations in North Korea.

== Early life ==
Alfred Russell Marcy, son of Albert Theodore Marcy and Julia Edna (Park) Marcy was born in Oneida, New York, July 21, 1900. His father worked as an industrial blacksmith and foreman for a steel company; his mother liked to write poetry and doted on crossword puzzles.

Following graduation from high school, Marcy entered into the New York Guard. While in the New York Guard, he worked in radio for WFBL, where he eventually became Chief Radio Engineer. By 1928, Marcy had been promoted to 2nd lieutenant of infantry of the 108th in the New York Guard as well as the US Army Reserve. Less than two years later, he was promoted to 1st lieutenant of infantry in both.

== World War II ==
On October 15, 1940, Marcy made the move from the New York Guard to the U.S. Army with the rank of major. At Fort Ord, California, while awaiting transfer overseas, he was promoted to lieutenant colonel. While in Hawaii, he commanded the 3rd Battalion of the 108th Infantry until he was shifted to the island of Kauai, where he served as executive officer of the 54th Infantry Brigade, 27th Division. He also planned and supervised installation of radio navigation aids and point-to-point joint army-navy radio stations from Hawaii to New Zealand and throughout the Central Pacific.

Marcy was promoted to full colonel in September 1944. He then was engaged in communication planning for assaults against Japanese base stations in the Gilberts, Marshalls, Palaus, Marianas, Bonins and the Ryukyu Islands. Colonel Alfred Russell Marcy served as the American Chief of the Radio Division and Deputy Signal Officer of the Central Pacific command during World War II.

== Korean War ==
After the war, he became deputy chief of the Army Communications System with headquarters in Washington, D.C. From August to October 1947, he served in Turkey in support of the Truman Doctrine.

When the Korean War broke out he was on a training mission with V Corps in Fort Bragg, North Carolina. He was then flown to Korea to become signal officer of the U.S. IX Corps during the Naktong River battles. He was then specifically selected by General Ned Almond to be signal officer of the U.S. X Corps for the Battle of Inchon landings and operations in North Korea.

== Dates of rank ==
Second Lieutenant	First Lieutenant	Captain	major	Lieutenant Colonel	Colonel
O-1	O-2	O-3	O-4	O-5	O-6
NGUS 11 July 1928	NGUS 7 June 1930	NGUS 8 August 1938	NGUS 15 October 1940	AUS 1 February 1942	AUS 6 September 1944
USAR 28 August 1928	USAR 8 July 1930		RA 24 August 1946	RA 15 July 1948	RA 15 May 1950

== Awards and decorations ==
- Legion of Merit with one Oak Leaf Cluster
- Bronze Star
- Air Medal
- American Defense Service Medal
- American Campaign Medal
- Asiatic Pacific Campaign Medal
- World War II Victory Medal
- Korean Service Medal
- Armed Forces Reserve Medal
- National Defense Service Medal
- United Nations Service Medal
- Republic of Korea Presidential Unit Citation
- Overseas Service Bars
