= DeFerriere House =

Historic house in New York, United States

- U.S. National Register of Historic Places
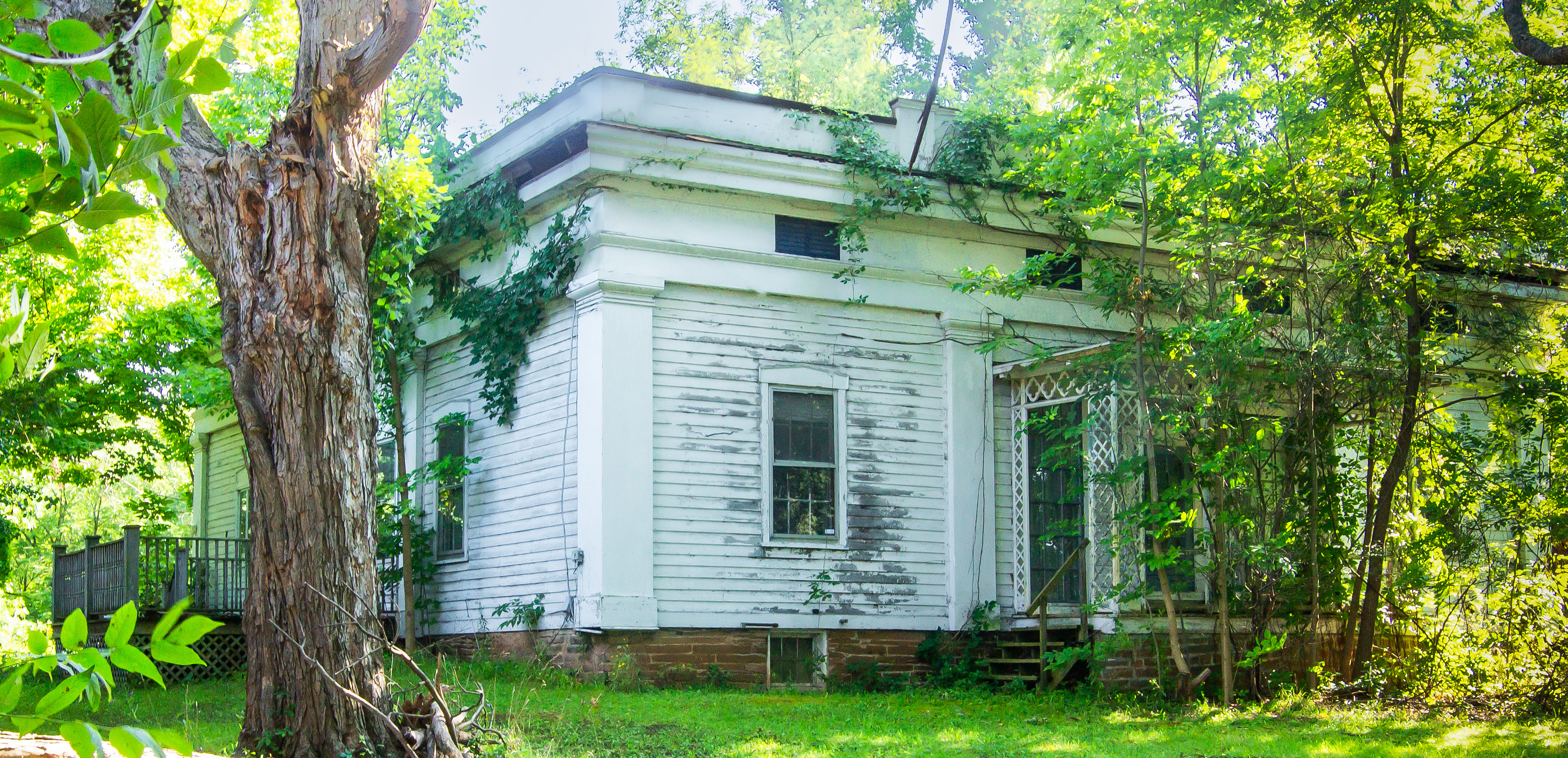

- Location within New York Location within the United States
- Location: 2089 Genesee St., Oneida, New York
- Coordinates: 43°4′25.79″N 75°41′38.73″W
- Area: 7.3 acres (3.0 ha)
- Built: 1832
- Architectural style: Greek Revival
- NRHP reference No.: 07000097
- Added to NRHP: March 1, 2007

DeFerriere House is a historic home located at Oneida in Madison County, New York. It is a 1 1/2-story, frame Greek Revival–style U-shaped dwelling.

It was added to the National Register of Historic Places in 2007.
