= Utica Armory =

- U.S. National Register of Historic Places
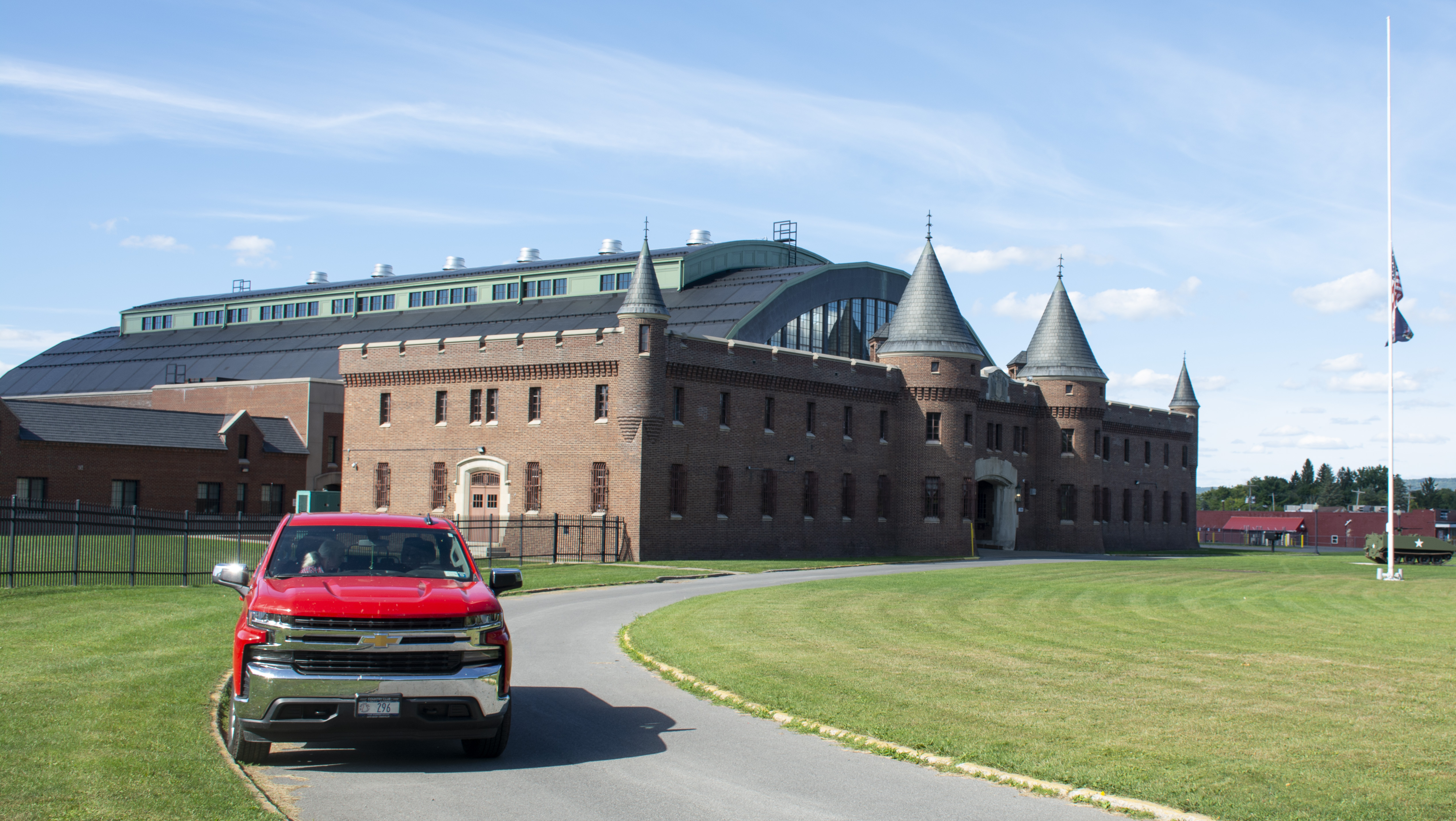

- Location within New York Location within the United States
- Location: 1700 Parkway Blvd. E. Utica, New York
- Coordinates: 43°4′47″N 75°12′33″W
- Area: 19.6 acres (7.9 ha)
- Built: 1930
- Architect: William Haugaard
- MPS: Army National Guard Armories in New York State MPS
- NRHP reference No.: 95000083
- Added to NRHP: March 2, 1995

Utica Armory is a historic National Guard armory building located in Utica in Oneida County, New York. It is a structural steel structure with brick curtain walls built in 1930 for Troop A, 121st Cavalry, and designed by State architect William Haugaard.

It consists of a two-story administration building with an attached three story drill shed. The administrative building features Tudor inspired towers, turrets and crenelated parapets.

It was listed on the National Register of Historic Places in 1995.
