= Cottage Lawn =

Historic house in New York, United States

- U.S. National Register of Historic Places
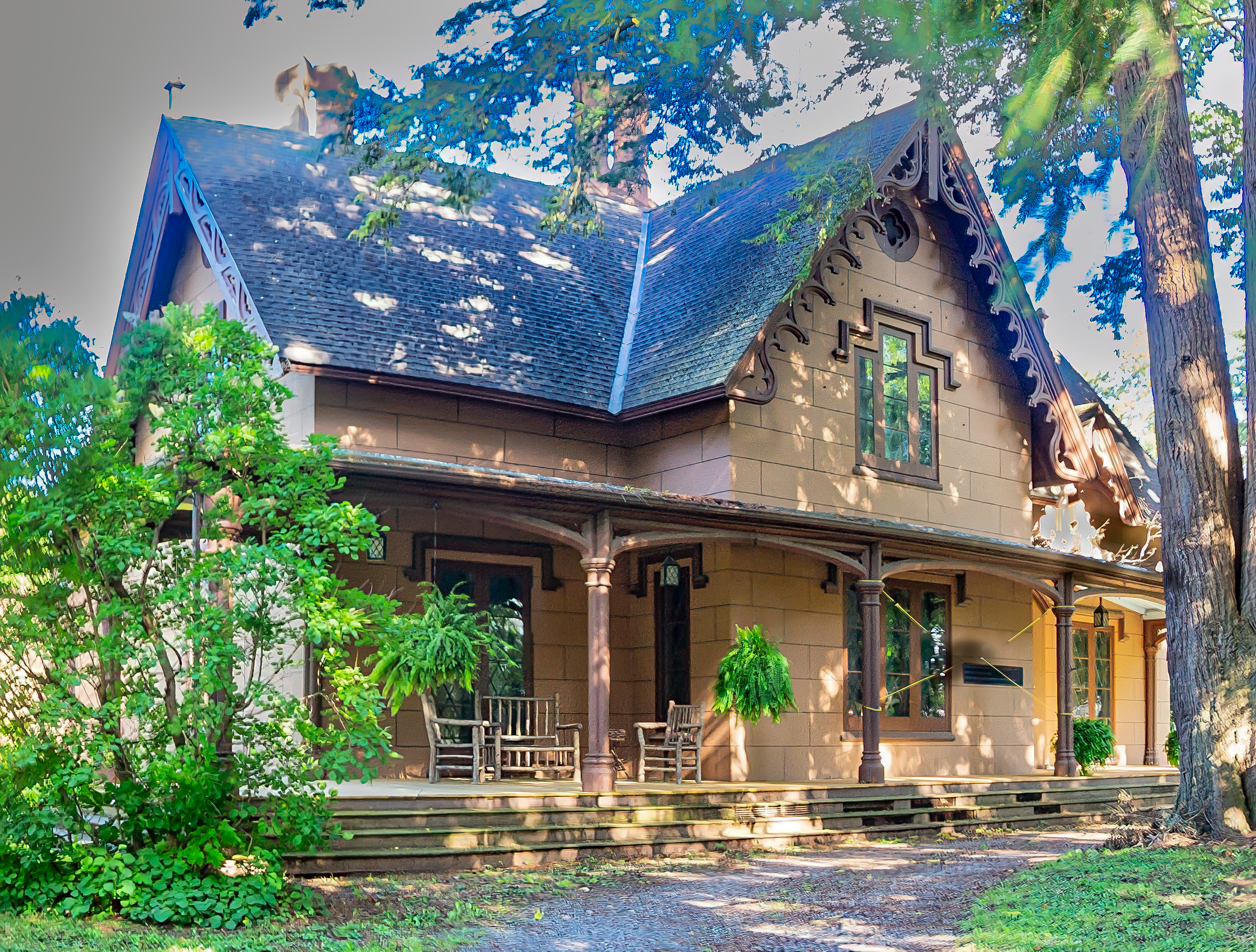

- Location within New York Location within the United States
- Location: 435 Main St., Oneida, New York
- Coordinates: 43°5′14″N 75°38′50″W
- Area: 2.6 acres (1.1 ha)
- Built: 1849
- Architect: Davis, Alexander Jackson
- Architectural style: Gothic Revival
- NRHP reference No.: 80002650
- Added to NRHP: November 6, 1980

Cottage Lawn is a historic home located at Oneida in Madison County, New York. It is a Gothic Revival style cottage designed by Alexander Jackson Davis and built in 1849. It is a two-story L-shaped house, with basement and attic. It is constructed of brick and coated in stucco. It features six quatrefoil columns that support Tudor arches spanning the verandah.

It was added to the National Register of Historic Places in 1980.

The Madison County Historical Society operates the house as the Cottage Lawn Museum, featuring Victorian period rooms and local history displays.
