= Louis J. Lefkowitz Building =

Building in Manhattan, New York

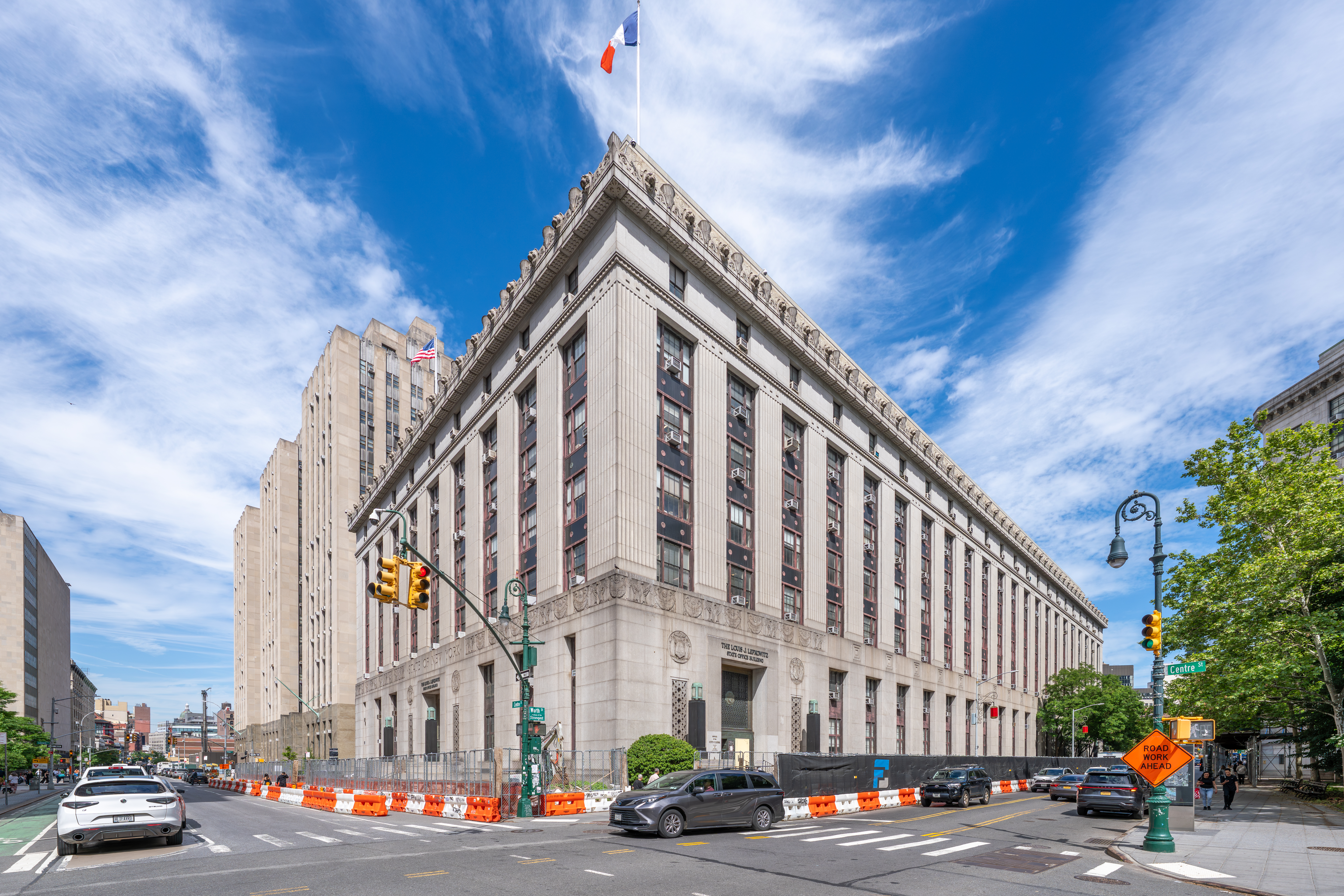
- (2026)

General information
- Type: Government
- Architectural style: Art Deco
- Location: Manhattan, 80 Centre Street
- Coordinates: 40.7152°N 74.0013°W
- Current tenants: Manhattan Marriage Bureau, New York Supreme Court
- Construction started: 1928
- Completed: 1930
- Cost: $6 Million
- Owner: Government of New York City
- Landlord: New York City Department of Citywide Administrative Services

Design and construction
- Architect: William Haugaard

Website
- Official website

The Louis J. Lefkowitz State Office Building is a building in the Civic Center of Manhattan in New York City. Designed by William Haugaard, State Architect for the State of New York, the Lefkowitz Building is home, among other things, to the Manhattan Marriage Bureau.

== History ==
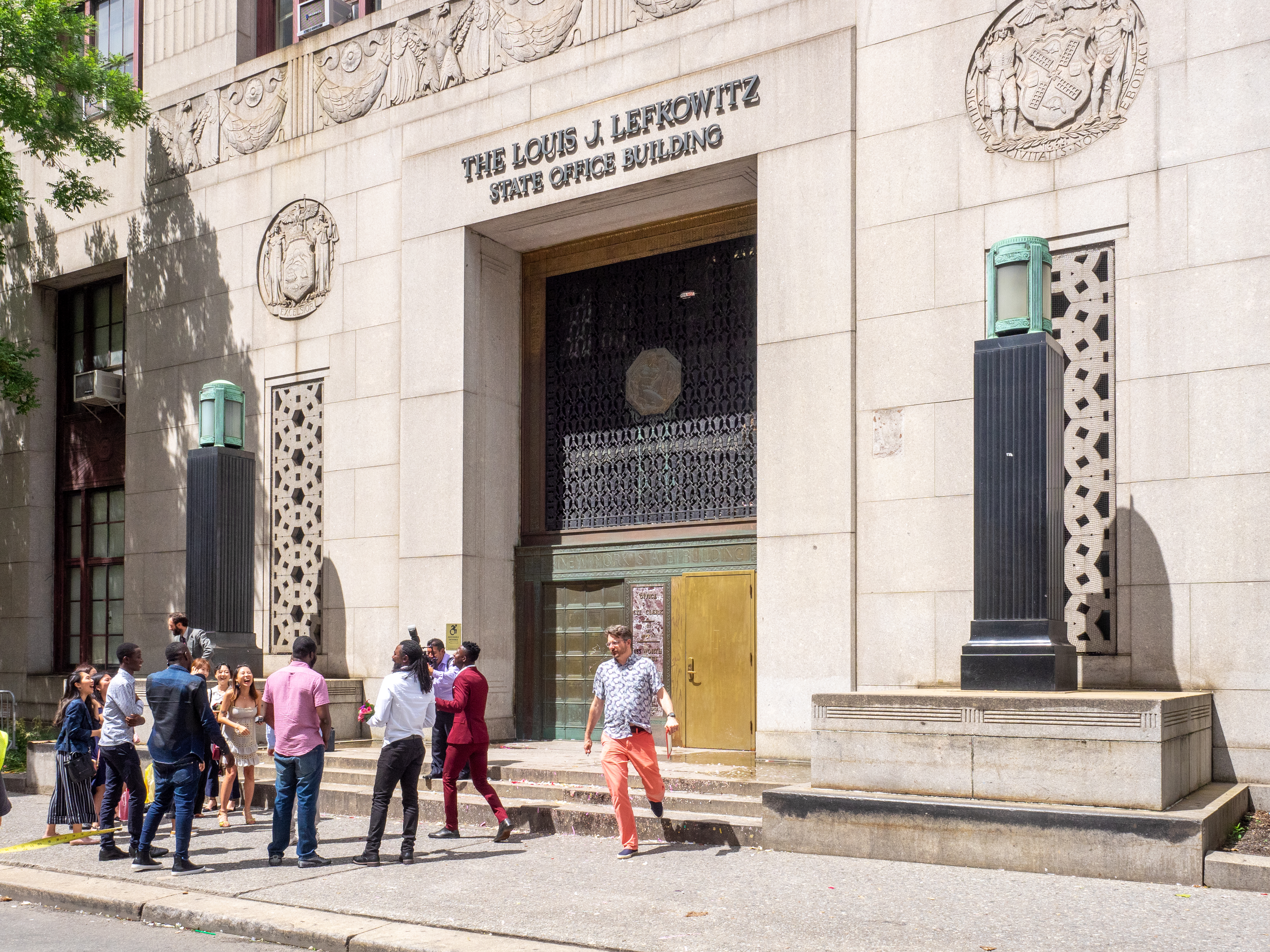
Marriage celebration taking place outside the building

Governor Al Smith laid the building’s cornerstone on December 18, 1928. At the ceremony, Smith declared that he “pray[ed to] God it may stand here through the ages as a testimonial to the people of this great commonwealth.”

The building opened in October 1930, and was originally home to the New York State Departments of Taxation, Finance, and Motor Vehicles. Originally known as the New York State Office Building, the State renamed it in honor of Louis J. Lefkowitz, then the longest-serving Attorney General of New York, in 1984.

In 2002, the State transferred the building to the City of New York, which began using it for marriages in 2009. The City moved the Manhattan Marriage Bureau to the Lefkowitz Building's ornate first floor lobby in order to better compete with wedding destinations such as Las Vegas. These matrimonial duties later rendered the Lefkowitz a monument to LGBTQ New Yorkers, as 293 couples wed there on the day same-sex marriage became legal in 2011.

=== Plans ===
In August 2018, Mayor Bill de Blasio and the New York City Department of Correction announced a plan to renovate or demolish the Lefkowitz Building, making way for an expanded jail, as part of its plan to close Rikers Island. Historic preservation groups, including the Historic Districts Council and New York Landmarks Conservancy, oppose the plan. “Though marriage is supposed to be forever, Mayor de Blasio wants to give this temple of love an ugly divorce,” wrote preservationist Adrian Untermyer in Gotham Gazette. In 2018, the Historic Districts Council formally requested that the New York City Landmarks Preservation Commission evaluate the Lefkowitz Building for designation as a New York City landmark.
