= State executive order =

Directive issued by a state governor in the United States

Executive Order No. 202.17, as issued by former New York Governor Andrew M. Cuomo

In the United States, a state executive order is a directive issued by a governor that regulates operations of the state government and certain aspects of citizen life. Powers of state executive orders are limited by the respective state constitution and/or executive and state law, and are also subject to the provisions of the United States Constitution and any applicable federal law.

Similar to presidential executive orders, they are subject to judicial review and can be invalidated if determined to violate any statutes or codes by which they are governed. The majority of them carry the force of law and remain in effect until revoked, suspended, canceled, proven unlawful, or expire by a date or condition set forth within itself. In 38 of the 50 states, there is no requirement for orders to undergo administrative procedure, which controls how they are formed and enacted. Six states mandate legislative review, and another six have these requirements only for executive orders of a certain type, like those having to do with the creation of agencies.

== Basis in state constitutions ==
Powers of executive order can be either constitutional, statutory, implied, or ‘general authority only' (Wyoming). In most state constitutions, there is no specific provision for the power of governors to issue executive orders. However, in many of those constitutions, there is a provision stating that the “executive power shall be vested in the governor” (New York) or “the supreme executive power of this State, shall be vested in a...Governor...” (Nevada), or similar. These sections supplement and give way for executive and state law that grants the powers of issuance of executive orders to governors.

== Powers ==
State executive orders are usually enacted less frequently than bills passed by state legislatures. They are especially used in the midst of a public health emergency or disaster. During a state of emergency (which usually can only be declared through executive order), the powers of the governor may be expanded beyond their normal reach. This allows for the release and reallocation of various state funds and resources to assist local governments and communities in dealing with crises, as well as modification of laws to aid in such.

Additionally, in many states, orders can be used for a large range of executive actions, including but not limited to:

- Temporarily suspending or modifying any statute, local law, ordinance, order, rule, regulation, or parts thereof
- Granting clemency
- Commuting or pardoning a criminal sentence
- Declaring a state of emergency
- Creating state agencies or commissions
- Redirecting state agencies and departments to help a certain purpose
- Issuing directives necessary to cope with a disaster or emergency
- Executive agreements between counterpart governors (similar to interstate compacts)

Note that some of these powers can only be invoked after the declaration of a state of emergency.

== Reactions and controversy ==
In light of the COVID-19 pandemic, virtually all US state governors issued some type of order either putting in place a stay-at-home mandate or advisory. As tensions escalated and Americans grew tired of quarantine, there were many protests in response, especially in Michigan. These protests called for “reopenings” of states, and many have brought into question the constitutionality of long-term quarantines and other large-scale societal changes imposed by governors.

== See also ==
- List of United States governors
- List of states and territories of the United States
- Decree
- State legal systems
