= Oneida, New York =

City in New York, United States

Oneida, New York Oneida: kanaˀalóhaleˀ
- City
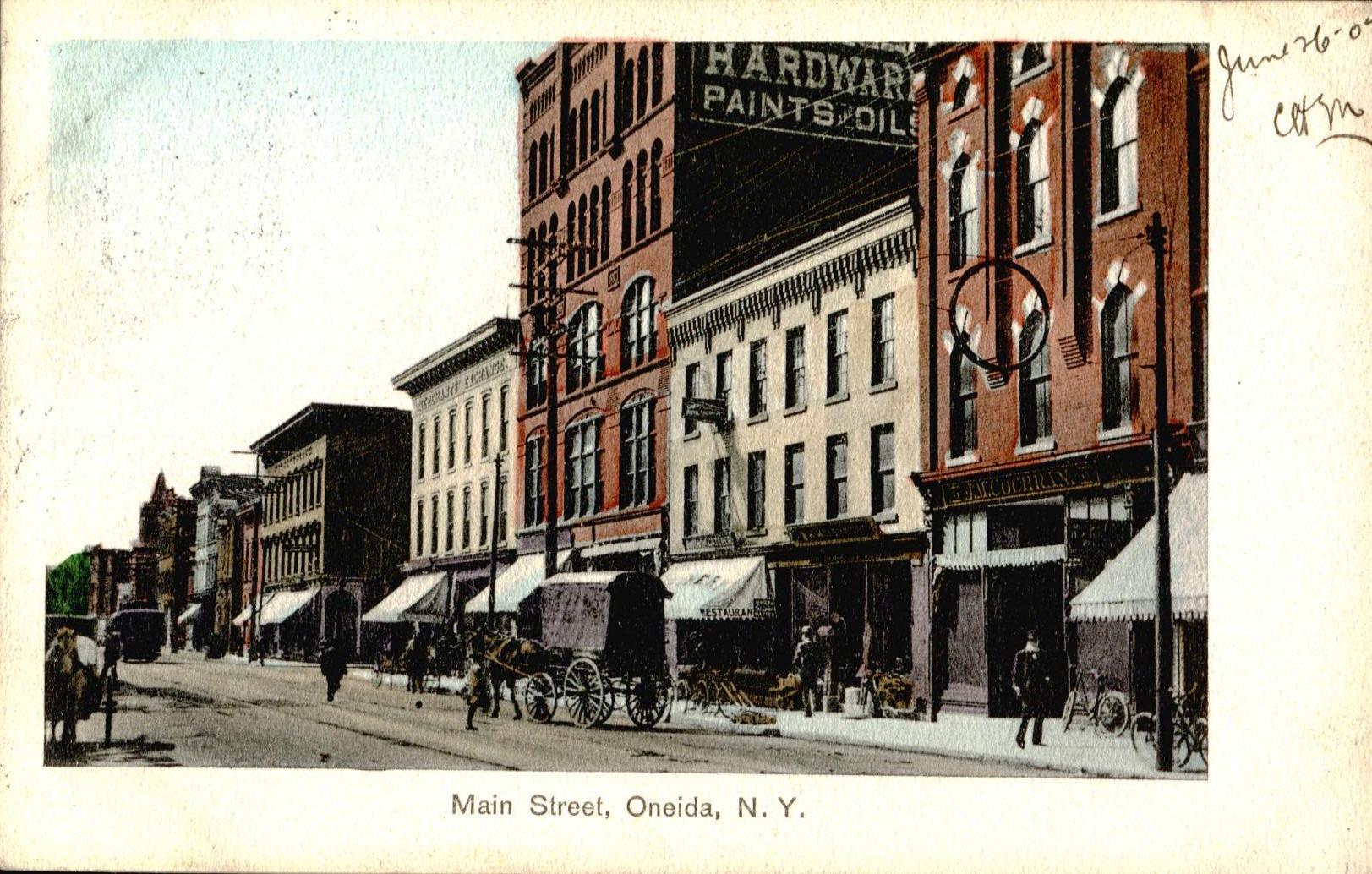
- Oneida Main Street in a 1907 postcard

- Seal

- Location within New York Location within the United States
- Coordinates: 43°5′6″N 75°39′12″W
- Country: United States
- State: New York
- County: Madison
- Chartered: 1901

Government
  - Type: Mayor-Council
  - Mayor: Rick Rossi (R)

Area
  - Total: 22.14 sq mi (57.33 km^{2})
  - Land: 22.05 sq mi (57.12 km^{2})
  - Water: 0.081 sq mi (0.21 km^{2})
- Elevation: 430 ft (131 m)

Population (2020)
  - Total: 10,329
  - Density: 468.4/sq mi (180.84/km^{2})
- Time zone: UTC-5 (Eastern (EST))
  - Summer (DST): UTC-4 (EDT)
- ZIP Codes: 13421 (Oneida); 13032 (Canastota); 13409 (Munnsville)
- Area code: 315
- FIPS code: 36-053-54837
- GNIS feature ID: 0959363
- Website: oneidacityny.gov

Oneida (/oʊˈnaɪdə/, Oneida: kanaˀalóhaleˀ) is a city in Madison County in the U.S. state of New York. It is located west of Oneida Castle (in Oneida County) and east of Wampsville. The population was 10,329 at the 2020 census, down from 11,390 in 2010. The city, like both Oneida County and the nearby silver and china maker, was named for the Oneida people, who had a large territory around Oneida Lake during the colonial period.

== History ==
In the post-Revolutionary period, central and western New York were settled by many migrants from New England. With development of the Erie Canal in the early 19th century, the movement of people expanded towards the Midwest as trade and commerce increased. Oneida's development began to pick up as new trade routes were opened, especially in the period initially following construction of the Oneida Lake canal and feeder and an associated railroad stop, tying it into major trade networks of the day.

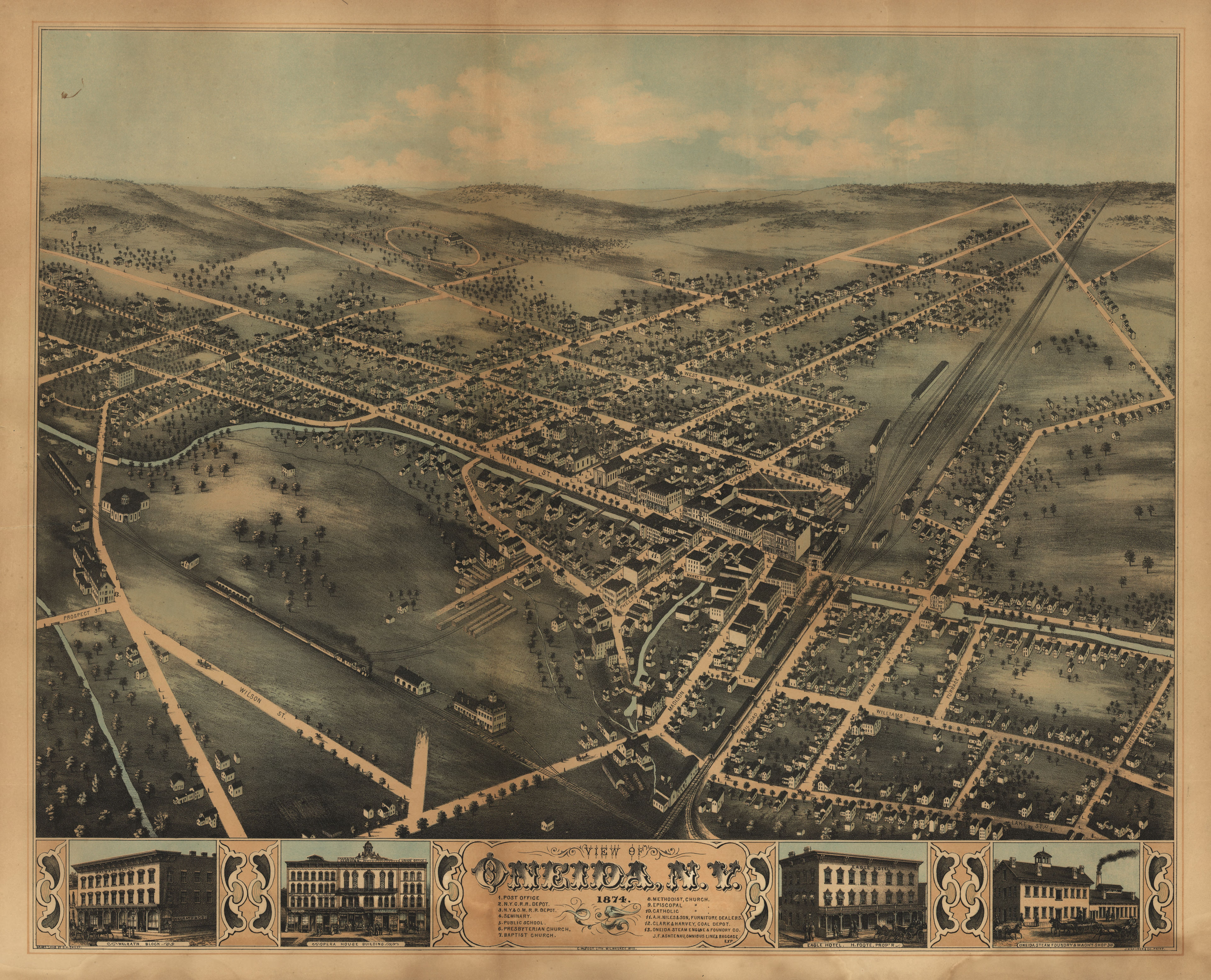
Panoramic map of Oneida from 1874

The village of Oneida was incorporated on June 20, 1848, as part of the larger town of Lenox to its west, but years of friction among the different sections of town spurred the village to establish itself independently as the new Town of Oneida in 1896. In turn, this town was later chartered as the City of Oneida on March 28, 1901.

The city's first elected mayor was Julius M. Goldstein, the co-founder of Powell & Goldstein Cigar Company. Goldstein was born in Prussia and immigrated in 1871.

The city was founded in 1834 by Sands Higinbotham, who contributed land to the Syracuse and Utica Railroad under the stipulation that all passenger trains stop at a depot he constructed, a arrangement that directly drove the early growth of Oneida Depot. His son Niles Higinbotham later donated land within the city for a public park and for the construction of four churches. The Oneida Valley Bank was established in 1851 by Niles, his father Sands, and their associate Samuel Breese. The Higinbotham family home, Cottage Lawn, built between 1849 and 1850 at the corner of Main and Grove Streets, was occupied by the family until 1934, when it was bequeathed to the Madison County Historical Society and is today listed on the National Register of Historic Places.

Oneida is located near the site of the former Oneida Community, a social and religious experiment that flourished during the third quarter of the 19th century. The community, founded by John Humphrey Noyes, lasted from 1848 until 1881. It produced silk and canned goods until the manufacturing of flatware picked up in the later years of the community's existence. This led to the foundation in 1880 of Oneida Limited, a company that outlasted the community and became one of America's most important flatware producers in the 20th century. The company is still headquartered in the city, although all US manufacturing operations have now ceased and all Oneida products are imported. The Oneida Community Mansion House, a National Historic Landmark, is preserved as the principal building of the Oneida Community.

Oneida has a number of properties on the National Register of Historic Places, including the Main-Broad-Grove Streets Historic District, Cottage Lawn, DeFerriere House, Mount Hope Reservoir, Oneida Armory, Oneida Community Mansion House, and United States Post Office.

== Geography ==
Oneida is in northeastern Madison County, bordered to the northeast by Oneida County. New York State Route 5 passes through the city south of its center, leading east into neighboring Oneida Castle and continuing 22 miles (35 km) to Utica; and west into neighboring Wampsville and 27 miles (43 km) to Syracuse. Interstate 90, the New York State Thruway, passes through the northern portion of Oneida but does not have a direct exit to the city: the nearest exits are for Verona to the east and Canastota to the west. New York State Route 46 passes through the center of Oneida, leading north and northeast 18 miles (29 km) to Rome and south 20 miles (32 km) to Hamilton.

According to the U.S. Census Bureau, the city has a total area of 22.1 square miles (57 km^{2}), of which 0.1 square miles (0.26 km^{2}) (0.23%) are covered by water. Oneida Creek forms the northeastern border of the city and the Oneida County line. The creek flows northwest to Oneida Lake, part of the Oswego River watershed leading northwest to Lake Ontario.

== Demographics ==
Historical population
Census	Pop.	Note	%±
1870	3,262		—
1880	3,934		20.6%
1890	6,083		54.6%
1900	6,364		4.6%
1910	8,317		30.7%
1920	10,541		26.7%
1930	10,558		0.2%
1940	10,291		−2.5%
1950	11,325		10.0%
1960	11,677		3.1%
1970	11,658		−0.2%
1980	10,810		−7.3%
1990	10,850		0.4%
2000	10,987		1.3%
2010	11,393		3.7%
2020	10,329		−9.3%
U.S. Decennial Census

=== 2020 census ===
As of the 2020 census, Oneida had a population of 10,329. The median age was 43.7 years. 20.0% of residents were under the age of 18 and 18.9% of residents were 65 years of age or older. For every 100 females there were 94.1 males, and for every 100 females age 18 and over there were 92.0 males age 18 and over.

79.9% of residents lived in urban areas, while 20.1% lived in rural areas.

There were 4,503 households in Oneida, of which 25.3% had children under the age of 18 living in them. Of all households, 35.4% were married-couple households, 21.9% were households with a male householder and no spouse or partner present, and 31.2% were households with a female householder and no spouse or partner present. About 36.2% of all households were made up of individuals and 14.1% had someone living alone who was 65 years of age or older.

There were 4,945 housing units, of which 8.9% were vacant. The homeowner vacancy rate was 2.4% and the rental vacancy rate was 7.7%.

Racial composition as of the 2020 census
Race	Number	Percent
White	9,272	89.8%
Black or African American	132	1.3%
American Indian and Alaska Native	203	2.0%
Asian	106	1.0%
Native Hawaiian and Other Pacific Islander	3	0.0%
Some other race	79	0.8%
Two or more races	534	5.2%
Hispanic or Latino (of any race)	222	2.1%

=== 2010 census ===
As of the 2010 census, 11,393 people, 4,672 households, and 2,814 families were residing in the city. The population density was 500 inhabitants per square mile (190/km^{2}).

Some 4,672 housing units were within the city limits. The racial makeup of the city was 96.29% White, 0.80% African American, 1.39% Native American, 0.46% Asian, 0.20% from other races, and 0.86% from two or more races. Hispanics or Latinos of any race were 0.84% of the population.

Of the 4,431 households 32.1% had children under 18 living with them, 45.3% were married couples living together, 11.9% had a female householder with no husband present, and 38.5% were not families. About 32.0% of all households were made up of individuals, and 13.5% had someone living alone who was 65 or older. The average household size was 2.40, and the average family size was 3.03.

In the city, the age distribution was 25.1% under 18, 7.9% from 18 to 24, 29.9% from 25 to 44, 22.1% from 45 to 64, and 15.0% who were 65 or older. The median age was 37 years. For every 100 females there were 92.5 males. For every 100 females 18 and over, there were 88.7 males.

The median income for a household in the city was $35,365, and for a family was $45,242. Males had a median income of $31,244 versus $23,846 for females. The per capita income for the city was $18,966. About 8.8% of families and 12.5% of the population were below the poverty line, including 11.5% of those under age 18 and 10.6% of those 65 or over.

== Education ==
The public Oneida City School District operates in most of Oneida, the city of Oneida Castle, the hamlet of Durhamville, the village of Wampsville, and certain parts of Canastota.

A portion is in the Vernon-Verona-Sherrill Central School District (a.k.a. Sherill City School District), and another portion is in the Stockbridge Valley Central School District.

== Government ==
The city government consists of a mayor who is elected at large and six council members, each elected from one of six wards.

== Communities and locations ==
- Bennetts Corners – A hamlet in the southeastern part of the city, located at the intersection of Peterboro and Middle Roads.
- Oneida Community – A former religious commune. The Oneida Community Mansion House is located at Kenwood Avenue and Skinner Road.

== Notable residents ==
- Riley Dixon, NFL punter
- James Howe, author of the Bunnicula book series
- Mike Lupica, author
- Alfred Marcy, recipient of the Legion of Merit
- Ted Phillips, president and CEO of the Chicago Bears
- Doug Salati, Caldecott winning illustrator
- Com Truise, electronic musician
