= Shepherd Hill =

Shepherd Hill, Shepherd's Hill or Shepherds Hill may refer to:

- Shepherd Hill (New York), an elevation in Oneida County, New York
- Shepherd Hill, Virginia, an unincorporated community in Virginia, U.S.
- Shepherd Hill Regional High School, a school in Dudley, Massachusetts, U.S.
- Shepherds Hill Radar Station RAAF, a radar station in Australia
