= Vernon-Verona-Sherrill Central School District =

School district in New York, United States

Coordinates: 43.1146°N 75.5690°W

Vernon-Verona-Sherrill Central School District, also known as the Sherrill City School District, is a school district in Verona, New York.

Its service area totals to 130 square miles (340 km^{2}).

== Service area ==
Most of the district is in Oneida County. There it includes most of the towns of Verona and Vernon, and parts of the towns of Kirkland, Vienna, and Westmoreland. It includes the village of Vernon and almost all of Sherrill, and all of Verona hamlet (census-designated place). It also includes a portion of the City of Rome.

A small portion of the district is in Oneida, Madison County.

== Schools ==
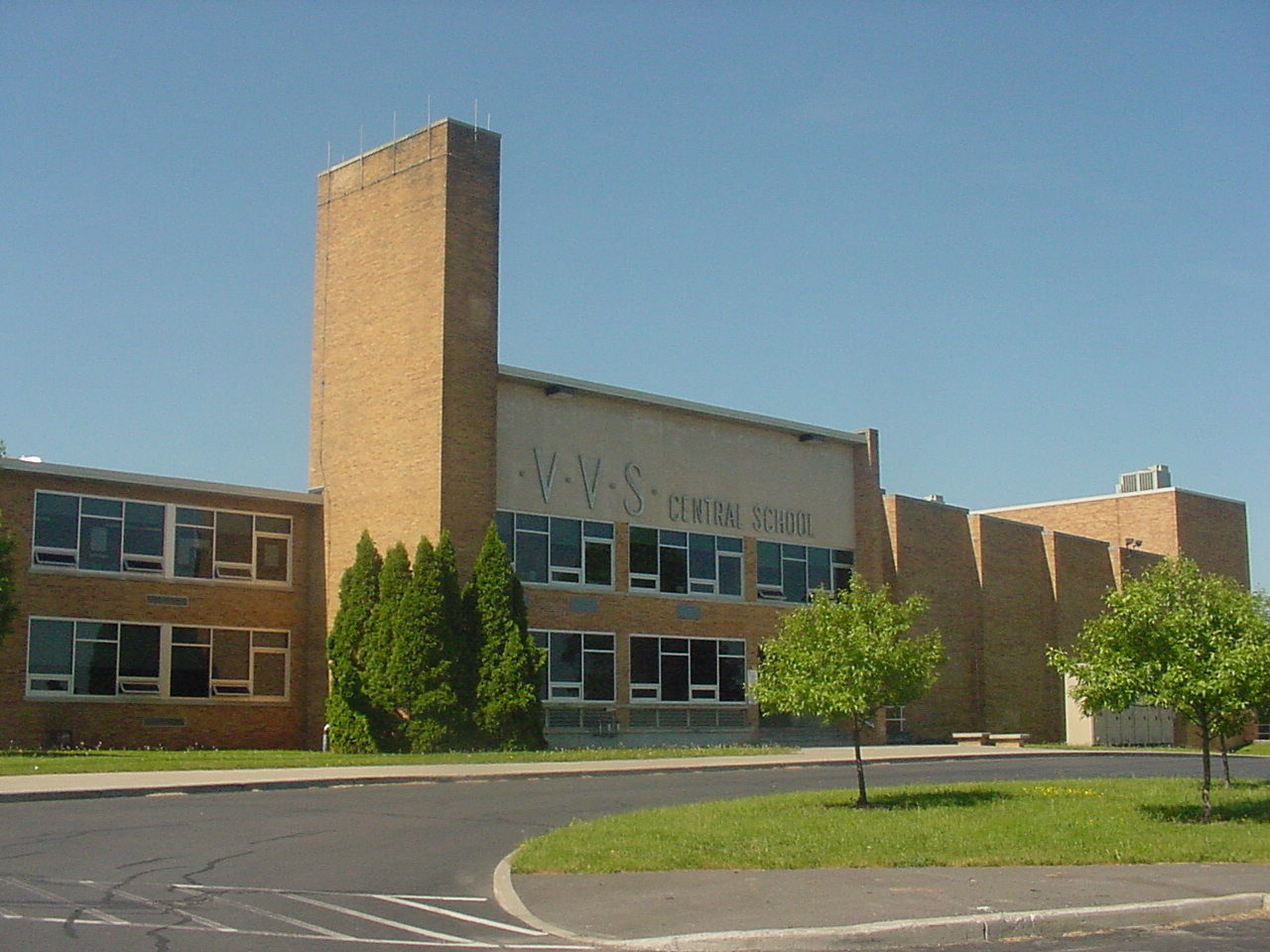
Vernon-Verona-Sherrill High School

It operates the following schools:

- E.A. McAllister Elementary School in Sherrill
- J.D. George Elementary School in Verona
- Vernon Elementary School, also known as W.A. Wettel Elementary School, in Vernon
- Vernon-Verona-Sherrill Middle School
- Vernon-Verona-Sherrill High School
