= Vernon-Verona-Sherrill High School =

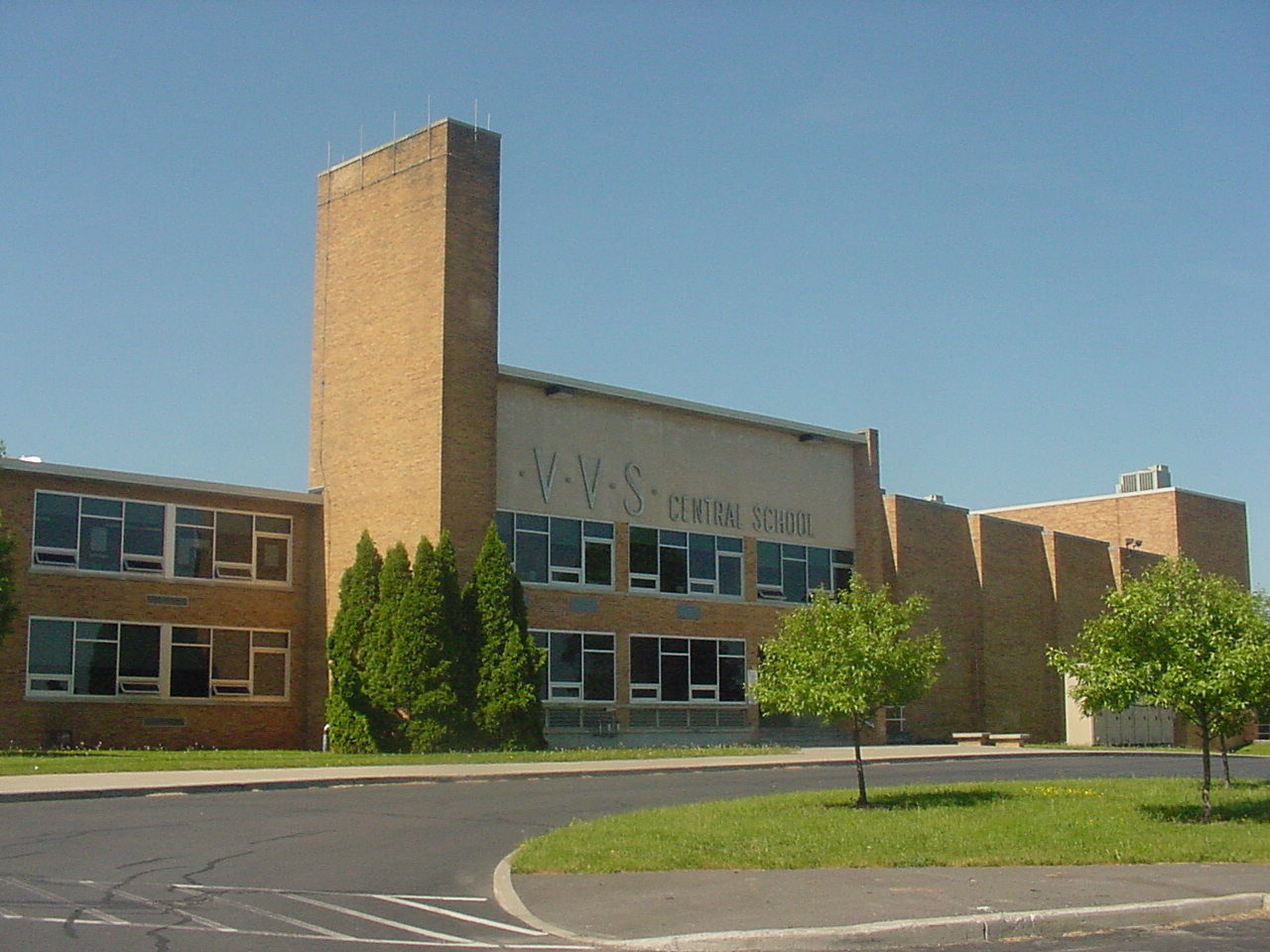
- The main entrance to Vernon-Verona-Sherrill High School

Location
- 5275 State Route 31, NY; Verona, New York 13478-0128; United States; 43°6′54″N 75°34′06″W

Information
- Established: 1954
- School district: Vernon-Verona-Sherrill Central School District
- Principal: Carrie Hodkinson
- Teaching staff: 43.27 (FTE)
- Grades: 9-12
- Enrollment: 594 (2023-2024)
- Student to teacher ratio: 13.73
- Colors: Red, White, and Black
- Mascot: Red Devil
- Newspaper: The Red Press
- Yearbook: Sheveron
- Website: https://www.vvsschools.org/schools/vvshs/index

Vernon-Verona-Sherrill High School, commonly referred to as VVS, is a public high school in Verona, New York. Vernon-Verona-Sherrill High School offers a comprehensive curriculum for grades 9-12 and is part of the Vernon-Verona-Sherrill Central School District which serves students from the towns of Verona and Vernon and the city of Sherrill.

== Overview ==
The main campus of Vernon-Verona-Sherrill High School was built in 1954, and is centrally located between the towns of Vernon and Verona and the city of Sherrill at the intersection of New York State Route 31 and Beacon Light Road. Facilities include a theater, two gymnasiums, fitness center, cafeteria, and a maple syrup factory operated by the Future Farmers of America (FFA) program. The High School building and Middle School building are linked and share some facilities such as the library and sports fields.

U.S. News & World Report's Education website reported in 2016-17 that the school's students scored 84% proficiency in English and 85% proficiency in Math on state exit exams along with a 93% graduation rate in that same year. In 2017, there were 597 students enrolled at VVS, which included 3% minorities and 30% economically disadvantaged students. The school employed 43 full-time teachers in 2017.

== Service area ==
Most of the district (the high school's attendance boundary) is in Oneida County. There it includes most of the towns of Verona and Vernon, and parts of the towns of Kirkland, Vienna, and Westmoreland. It includes the village of Vernon, almost all of Sherrill, and all of Verona hamlet (census-designated place). It also includes a portion of the City of Rome.

A small portion of the district is in Oneida, Madison County.

== Academics ==
VVS offers a local diploma and the New York State Regents diploma. Students can also take Advanced Placement courses in a number of subjects and receive vocational training at the local Madison-Oneida county BOCES.

== Demographics ==
According to the NYSED's Student Information Repository System the school is 53% male and 47% female with percentage by grades goes as follows: 9-10 grades - 24% enrollment, 11th grade - 25% and 12th grade - 27%.

== Athletics ==
Sports compete at the Class B, C, and D levels in Section III of the New York State Public High School Athletic Association. Varsity teams include:

Varsity teams
Type	Fall Sports	Winter Sports	Spring Sports
Boys	Cross Country, Football, Soccer	Basketball, Bowling, Diving*, Indoor Track and Field, Swimming*, Volleyball, Wrestling	Baseball, Golf, Lacrosse, Tennis, Track and Field
Girls	Cross Country, Field Hockey, Soccer, Tennis	Basketball, Bowling, Diving*, Indoor Track and Field, Swimming* Volleyball	Golf, Lacrosse, Softball, Track and Field

*Individual athletes compete on the Oneida High School Swimming and Diving team.

== Notable alumni ==
- Matt Patricia - Defensive Coordinator for Ohio State Buckeyes football and former senior football advisor and defensive coordinator for the New England Patriots. Former head coach of the Detroit Lions
- Clifford Luyk - Former basketball player and coach, who played professionally in Spain and Europe
- Philip Markoff -"The Craigslist Killer," an American medical student who was charged with the armed robbery and murder of Julissa Brisman in a Boston hotel on April 14, 2009, and two other armed robberies.
- Adam Kemp - Professional Basketball Player
