= Vernon Center, New York =

- Hamlet
- Location within New York Location within the United States
- Coordinates: 43°03′08″N 75°30′06″W
- Country: United States
- State: New York
- County: Oneida
- Elevation: 801 ft (244 m)
- Time zone: UTC-5 (Eastern (EST))
  - Summer (DST): UTC-4 (EDT)
- ZIP code: 13477
- Area codes: 315 & 680
- GNIS feature ID: 968496

Vernon Center is a hamlet in the town of Vernon, Oneida County, New York, United States. The community is located at the intersection of state routes 26 and 31, 2.7 miles (4.3 km) southeast of the village of Vernon. Vernon Center has a post office with ZIP code 13477, which opened on January 16, 1823.

The Vernon Center Green Historic District was placed on the National Register of Historic Places in 1985, as "a rare surviving example in central New York State of an eighteenth century New England type village green." The protected district includes the Victorian Gazebo erected in 1901, the Green itself, the Parkside United Methodist Church and parsonage, and the former Vernon Center Presbyterian Church, recently restored and reopened as a community venue called This Old Church.

The first religious sermon in Vernon Center was given outdoors in the fall of 1799 by Rev. Samuel Kirkland, missionary to the Oneidas, and founder of what became Hamilton College.

== Notable person ==
- Ellen A. Dayton Blair (1837–1926), social reformer and art teacher
