= Lairdsville =

Lairdsville may refer to:

- Lairdsville, New York
- Lairdsville, Pennsylvania
