= Oneida Castle, New York =

Village in Oneida County, New York, US

Oneida Castle, New York tkanaˀalóhaleˀ
- Village
- Location in Oneida County and the state of New York.
- Coordinates: 43°4′42″N 75°38′0″W
- Country: United States
- State: New York
- County: Oneida

Area
  - Total: 0.51 sq mi (1.31 km^{2})
  - Land: 0.51 sq mi (1.31 km^{2})
  - Water: 0 sq mi (0.00 km^{2})
- Elevation: 449 ft (137 m)

Population (2020)
  - Total: 586
  - Density: 1,158.1/sq mi (447.16/km^{2})
- Time zone: UTC-5 (Eastern (EST))
  - Summer (DST): UTC-4 (EDT)
- ZIP Code: 13421 (Oneida)
- FIPS code: 36-54848
- GNIS feature ID: 0959364

Oneida Castle (Oneida: tkanaˀalóhaleˀ) is a village in Oneida County, New York, United States. The population was 586 at the 2020 census. The village is in the northwestern corner of the town of Vernon. Oneida Castle is east of the city of Oneida (located in Madison County) and west of the city of Sherrill in New York State.

== History ==
The village was formerly the site of a major fortified village, Kanonwalohale (written as "tkanaˀalóhaleˀ" modern Oneida orthography), of the Oneida tribe, one of the original Five Nations of the Iroquois Confederacy. They established it in the beginning of the 18th century, moving from an area where they suffered raids by parties from the French colony of Quebec, which was trying to control their fur trade. The village was surrounded by tall wooden palisades, with a moat bordering this. Dwellings and storage structures were protected inside. Mohawk Joseph Brant led a war party which destroyed the village in July 1780.

Later European-American settlers named the village of Oneida Castle for this last great village or "castle" of the Oneida people. In the colonial period, Europeans often referred to the major fortified Iroquois villages as "castles" because it was a familiar reference for them for such a settlement; other examples include Seneca Castle and Genesee Castle.

== Geography ==
Oneida Castle is located at 43°4′42″N 75°38′0″W (43.078335, -75.633383). Oneida Castle is the approximate geographic center of New York State. There have been past attempts to move the state capitol here. According to the United States Census Bureau, the village has a total area of 0.5 square miles (1.3 km^{2}), all land.

== Demographics ==
Historical population
Census	Pop.	Note	%±
1870	262		—
1880	239		−8.8%
1890	317		32.6%
1900	291		−8.2%
1910	393		35.1%
1920	466		18.6%
1930	490		5.2%
1940	556		13.5%
1950	596		7.2%
1960	754		26.5%
1970	788		4.5%
1980	751		−4.7%
1990	671		−10.7%
2000	627		−6.6%
2010	625		−0.3%
2020	586		−6.2%
U.S. decennial census

At the 2000 census there were 627 people, 264 households, and 178 families in the village. The population density was 1,201.1 inhabitants per square mile (463.7/km^{2}). There were 284 housing units at an average density of 544.1 per square mile (210.1/km^{2}). The racial makeup of the village was 98.25% white, .80% Native American, .32% Asian, and .64% from two or more races. Hispanic or Latino of any race were .32%.

Of the 264 households 26.9% had children under the age of 18 living with them, 56.8% were married couples living together, 8.0% had a female householder with no husband present, and 32.2% were non-families. 26.1% of households were one person and 11.0% were one person aged 65 or older. The average household size was 2.38 and the average family size was 2.87.

The age distribution was 21.5% under the age of 18, 7.7% from 18 to 24, 26.5% from 25 to 44, 26.8% from 45 to 64, and 17.5% 65 or older. The median age was 41 years. For every 100 females, there were 96.6 males. For every 100 females age 18 and over, there were 89.2 males.

The median household income was $40,789 and the median family income was $45,875. Males had a median income of $35,568 versus $26,964 for females. The per capita income for the village was $20,056. About 5.5% of families and 6.8% of the population were below the poverty line, including 12.5% of those under age 18 and 2.5% of those age 65 or over.
