= Verona, New York =

Verona, New York Teonatale (Oneida)
- Town
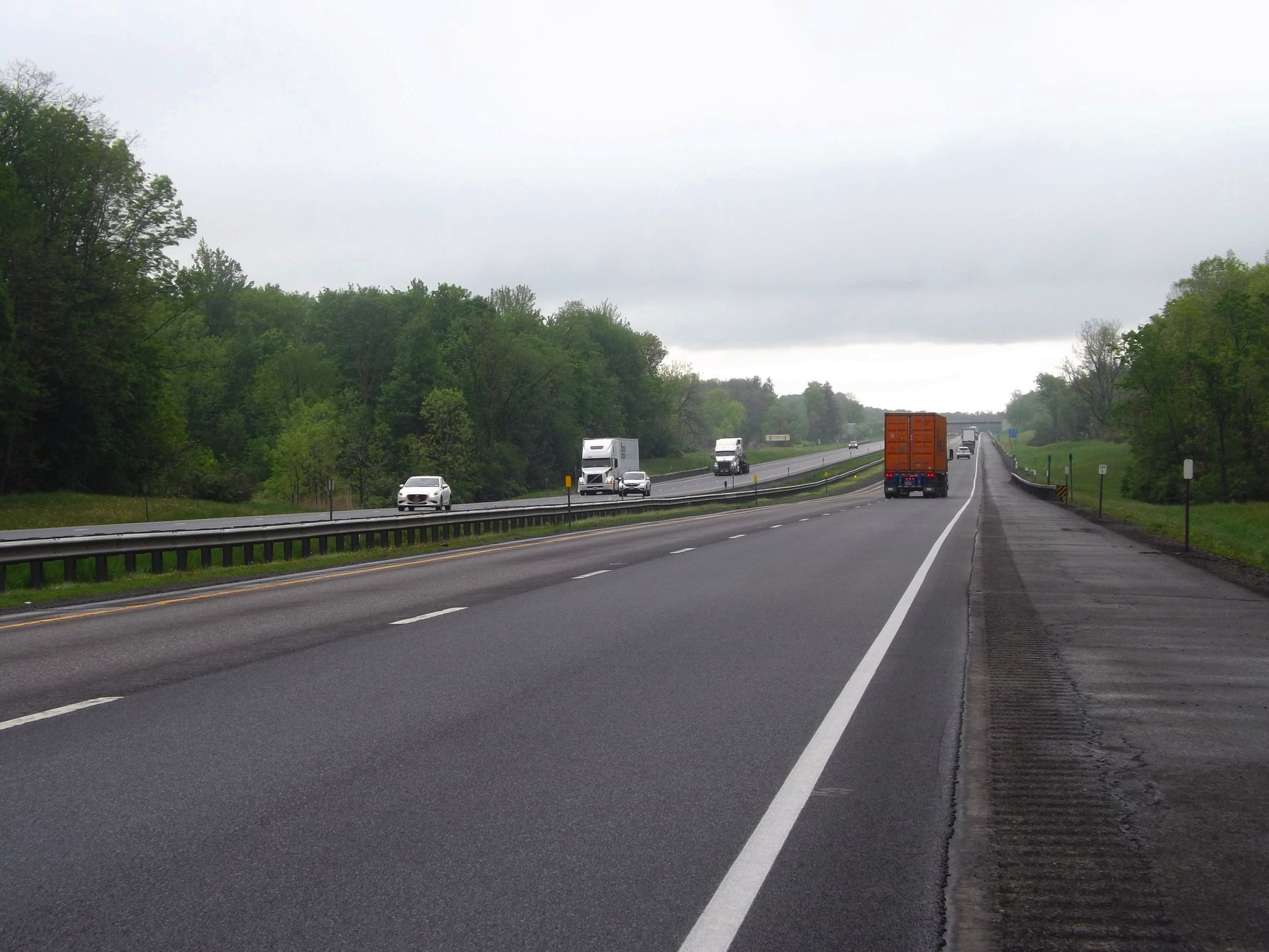
- View of the eastbound New York State Thruway in Verona

- Location in Oneida County and the state of New York.
- Coordinates: 43°9′0″N 75°37′16″W
- Country: United States
- State: New York
- County: Oneida

Government
  - Type: Town Council
  - Town Supervisor: Scott Musacchio (R)
  - Town Council: Members' List: • Kenneth Regner (R); • Kenneth Brewer (R); • Jeff Kahler (R); • Fred Scherz, Jr. (R)

Area
  - Total: 69.61 sq mi (180.30 km^{2})
  - Land: 69.25 sq mi (179.36 km^{2})
  - Water: 0.37 sq mi (0.95 km^{2})
- Elevation: 446 ft (136 m)

Population (2010)
  - Total: 6,293
  - Estimate (2016): 6,251
  - Density: 90.3/sq mi (34.85/km^{2})
- Time zone: UTC-5 (Eastern (EST))
  - Summer (DST): UTC-4 (EDT)
- ZIP Codes: 13478 (Verona); 13054 (Durhamville); 13162 (Verona Beach); 13032 (Canastota); 13421 (Oneida); 13440 (Rome); 13476 (Vernon)
- Area code: 315
- FIPS code: 36-77178
- GNIS feature ID: 0979581
- Website: www.townverona.org

Verona (called Te-o-na-ta-le, "pine forest" by the Haudenosaunee) is a town in southwestern Oneida County, New York, United States. The population was 6,293 at the 2010 census. The town was named after Verona, Italy.

Verona is located 8 miles (13 km) south of the city of Rome.

== History ==
Part of the extensive territory of the Haudenosaunee or Iroquois League, the municipality was first settled by European Americans in 1792, after the American Revolutionary War.

The Town of Verona was established from the Town of Westmoreland, in 1802.

In 1993, the Oneida Nation purchased land in the town. On this site it built and opened a casino and bingo hall. By 1997, this facility had been developed as a full-scale resort called Turning Stone Resort Casino.

== Geography ==
According to the United States Census Bureau, the town has a total area of 69.7 square miles (181 km^{2}), of which 69.3 square miles (179 km^{2}) is land and 0.4 square miles (1.0 km^{2}) (0.59%) is water.

Mineral springs in the town have sulfurous gas.

The western part of the town borders Oneida Lake and Madison County. The New York State Thruway and the Erie Canal cross the town.

== Demographics ==
Historical population
Census	Pop.	Note	%±
1810	1,014		—
1820	2,447		141.3%
1830	3,739		52.8%
1840	4,504		20.5%
1850	5,587		24.0%
1860	5,967		6.8%
1870	5,757		−3.5%
1880	5,287		−8.2%
1890	4,535		−14.2%
1900	3,875		−14.6%
1910	3,456		−10.8%
1920	3,136		−9.3%
1930	3,192		1.8%
1940	3,636		13.9%
1950	4,017		10.5%
1960	5,305		32.1%
1970	6,290		18.6%
1980	6,681		6.2%
1990	6,460		−3.3%
2000	6,425		−0.5%
2010	6,293		−2.1%
2016 (est.)	6,251	▼	−0.7%
U.S. Decennial Census

As of the census of 2000, there were 6,425 people, 2,399 households, and 1,813 families residing in the town. The population density was 92.7 inhabitants per square mile (35.8/km^{2}). There were 2,665 housing units at an average density of 38.5 per square mile (14.9/km^{2}). The racial makeup of the town was 97.71% White, 0.37% African American, 0.64% Native American, 0.37% Asian, 0.02% Pacific Islander, 0.05% from other races, and 0.84% from two or more races. Hispanic or Latino of any race were 0.47% of the population.

There were 2,399 households, out of which 34.5% had children under the age of 18 living with them, 61.8% were married couples living together, 8.5% had a female householder with no husband present, and 24.4% were non-families. 19.0% of all households were made up of individuals, and 8.2% had someone living alone who was 65 years of age or older. The average household size was 2.68 and the average family size was 3.05.

In the town, the population was spread out, with 26.6% under the age of 18, 6.6% from 18 to 24, 29.2% from 25 to 44, 25.2% from 45 to 64, and 12.4% who were 65 years of age or older. The median age was 38 years. For every 100 females, there were 103.1 males. For every 100 females age 18 and over, there were 101.6 males.

The median income for a household in the town was $42,745, and the median income for a family was $47,951. Males had a median income of $32,328 versus $23,646 for females. The per capita income for the town was $18,017. About 3.8% of families and 5.7% of the population were below the poverty line, including 6.8% of those under age 18 and 3.0% of those age 65 or over.

== Education ==
Most of the Town of Verona is part of the Vernon-Verona-Sherrill Central School District. Students in grades Pre-K through 6 attend John D. George Elementary School, located on Main Street in the village of Verona. The main campus of Vernon-Verona-Sherrill High School and Middle School is located on New York State Route 31 in Verona and serves students in grades 7–12.

Parts of Verona town are in Oneida City School District and Rome City School District

== Communities and locations ==
- Agnes Corners – A hamlet southwest of Churchville
- Blackmans Corners – A hamlet northeast of Verona
- Cagwin Corners – A hamlet north of Verona
- Churchville – A hamlet southwest of Verona Mills
- Dumbarton – A hamlet on New York State Route 46 north of State Bridge
- Durhamville – A hamlet near the western town line
- Dams Corner – A hamlet southwest of Verona
- Fish Creek Station – A hamlet in the northwestern part of the town near Verona Beach State Park
- Goodrich Corners – A hamlet on the eastern town line
- Higginsville – A hamlet on Route 46 north of Starks Landing, noted in the 19th century for Erie Canal boatbuilding
- Irish Ridge – An elevation located south of Starks Landing
- Johnnycake Hill – An elevation located north of Agnes Corners
- New London – A hamlet along the Erie Canal in north Verona
- Paradise Hill – A hamlet southeast of Starks Landing
- Sconondoa – A hamlet on the town line in the southwestern part of the town
- Shepherd Hill – An elevation northeast of Agnes Corners
- Stacy Basin – A hamlet north of Higginsville on Route 46
- Starks Landing – A hamlet on Route 46, north of Dumbarton
- State Bridge – A hamlet north of Durhamville on Route 46
- Sylvan Beach – A village on the western edge of the town
- Verona – A hamlet originally called "Hand's Village" that was the site of a health spa
- Verona Beach – A hamlet on the shore of Oneida Lake, north of Verona Beach State Park
- Verona Beach State Park – A state park on Oneida Lake
- Verona Mills – A hamlet in the northeastern corner of the town
- Verona Station – A hamlet, located on Route 31, west of Verona
