= Coffee Joulies =

Device for regulating coffee temperature

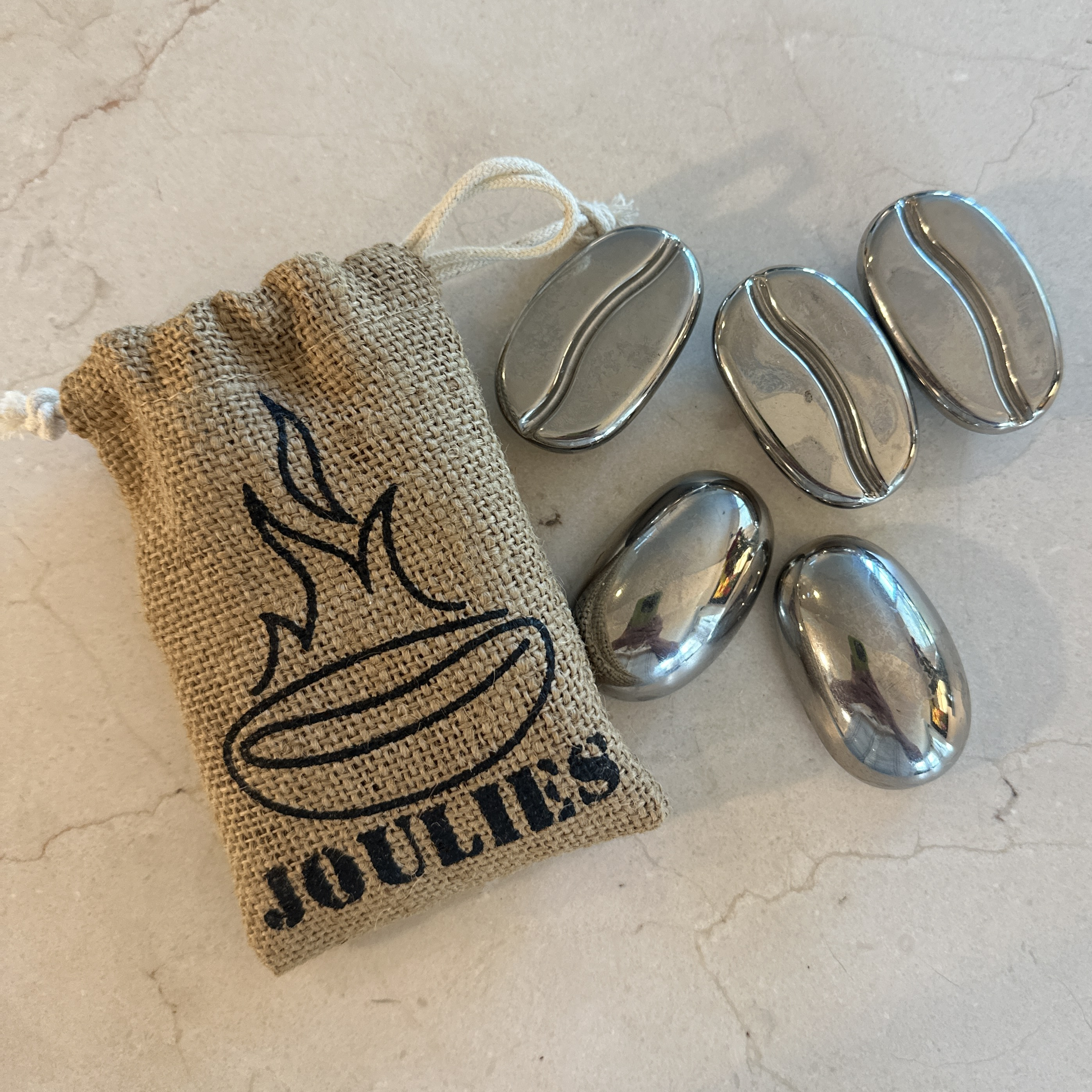
- Website: http://www.joulies.com/

Coffee Joulies are small, stainless-steel capsules containing a phase-change material; the capsules were designed to be placed in a cup of coffee in order to cool coffee that is too hot and slowly release the heat to keep the coffee warm. The company was founded by Dave Petrillo and Dave Jackson, mechanical engineers from Pennington, New Jersey.

They made prototypes in their basement, then in 2011 started refining and producing them in rented space at Sherrill Manufacturing in Sherrill, New York, a former Oneida silverware factory that had changed its business model to hosting startups and small companies in 2010, after Oneida had moved most of its manufacturing overseas in 2004 but had left a small amount of business with the factory under contract. The company received help on manufacturing costs from Sherrill and raised money on Kickstarter in 2011. The team decided to continue with production in the United States, rather than moving to Mexico, as was their initial plan.

A similar concept using phase change materials, but integrated into the walls and bottom of a cup, had been invented by the Fraunhofer Institute for Building Physics in 2009.

Some reviews show Joulies work while others have expressed doubts over the product's effectiveness. After doing some tests, they reported that the product does not work very well if at all. Specifically it is stated that the promised effect, while existing, is "barely noticeable", especially when compared to adding other objects of similar heat capacity, thus being far from the creators' claims that the drink “will be ready to drink three times sooner and will remain hot twice as long.”

In 2013 the founders were contestants on Shark Tank and raised $150,000.
