= Mary A. P. Stansbury =

- Born: October 5, 1842; Vernon Center
- Died: January 7, 1928
- Education: Lawrence University
- Occupation: Poet

Mary Anna Phinney Stansbury (October 5, 1842 – January 7, 1928) was an American poet known for her lifetime association with Lawrence University in Appleton, Wisconsin.

Mary Anna Phinney was born on October 5, 1842 in Vernon Center, New York. She was the daughter of the Rev. Samuel C. Phinney and Loriam Phinney, who moved to Appleton in 1853. She began studying at Lawrence University in 1853 at age 11 and graduated in 1859 at age 16, making her the youngest person to ever graduate from the university.

She published numerous poems in publications including Scribner's, The Youth's Companion, The Aldine, Christian Union, and Cottage Hearth. Some of her most anthologized poems include "The Surprise at Ticonderoga", about the 1775 capture of Fort Ticonderoga during the American Revolutionary War, and "How He Saved St. Michael's," about an enslaved black man who saved St. Michael's Church in Charleston, South Carolina from burning. She also wrote short stories, including "The Soul of Marse Ralph" (The New England Magazine, 1890).

Stansbury was one of the first female trustees of Lawrence University, serving from 1874 to 1880. She married another future trustee, Dr. Emory Stansbury, in 1872. All four of her children graduated from Lawrence University.

Mary Anna Phinney Stansbury died on January 7, 1928.

== Bibliography ==
- The Path of Years. Appleton, Wisconsin: 1907.
