= Durhamville, New York =

- Census-designated place
- Location within the state of New York
- Coordinates: 43°7′14″N 75°40′16″W
- Country: United States
- State: New York
- County: Oneida
- Elevation: 433 ft (132 m)
- Time zone: UTC-5 (Eastern (EST))
  - Summer (DST): UTC-4 (EDT)
- ZIP Codes: 13054 (Durhamville); 13421 (Oneida)
- Area code: 315
- FIPS code: 36-36065
- GNIS feature ID: 0948834

Durhamville is a hamlet located in Oneida County, New York, United States. As of the 2020 census, Durhamville had a population of 527.

The Hamlet of Durhamville is in the southern part of the county and is approximately 1.75 miles north of Oneida on Route 46. It is located within the town of Verona, New York.

== History ==
Durhamville is a small hamlet that was founded before 1813 and named for Eber Durham.

From the mid-1800s until the early 1900s, Durhamville was home to Erie Canal barge construction and repair. In particular, it was home to an Erie Canal lock which was abandoned when the route of the canal was changed. It was also the location of the Fox & Company glass house which, at the time, was one of the largest glass companies in the nation.

== Geography ==
Durhamville is located at 43°7′14″N 75°40′16″W (43.1206241, -75.6710161).
