= No. 19 Radar Station RAAF =

No. 19 Radar Station RAAF was a Royal Australian Air Force radar station formed at Bombi near Bouddi, New South Wales, Australia on 15 April 1942.

The unit was formed from serviceman drawn from Shepherd's Hill Radar Station personnel at Newcastle, after the radar was relocated to Bombi. The radar station at Bombi was built to monitor enemy airborne threats during World War II.

No. 19 Radar Station RAAF was disbanded on 10 September 1946.

== Commanding officers ==
- R.S. Choate (PltOff) – 10 January 1942
- A.E. Grey (PltOff) – 15 April 1942
- J. Uren (PltOff) – 26 August 1942
- R.A. Goodsir (FlgOff) – 4 October 1942
- W.H. O'Donnell (PltOff) – 16 April 1943
- J.B. Ross (PltOff) – 17 August 1943
- W.T.S. Middleton (PltOff) – 6 December 1943
- R.G. Sheaffe (FltLt) – 10 February 1944
- A.G. Svensen (FlgOff) – 6 October 1944
