= Adelaide S. Hall =

American art connoisseur, curator, and civic organizer

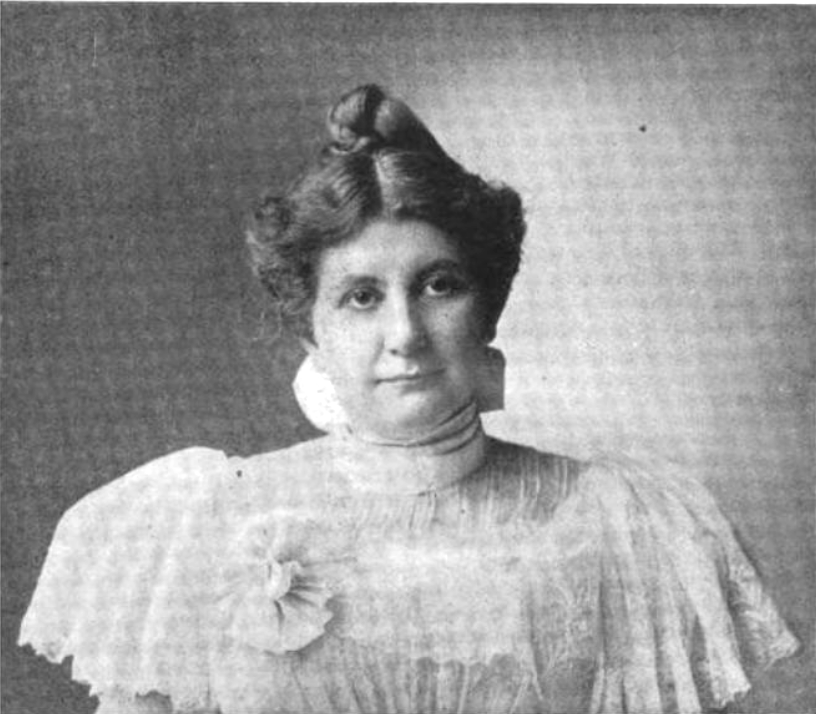
- Hall in 1898
- Born: Adelaide Susan Wade; November 2, 1857; Westmoreland, New York, U.S.
- Died: June 3, 1924 (aged 66); Los Angeles, California, U.S.
- Other name: Mrs. Herman J. Hall
- Education: Normal School at Buffalo, New York
- Occupations: art connoisseur, curator, promoter, critic; park supporter
- Spouse: Herman J. Hall (m. 1876)

Signature
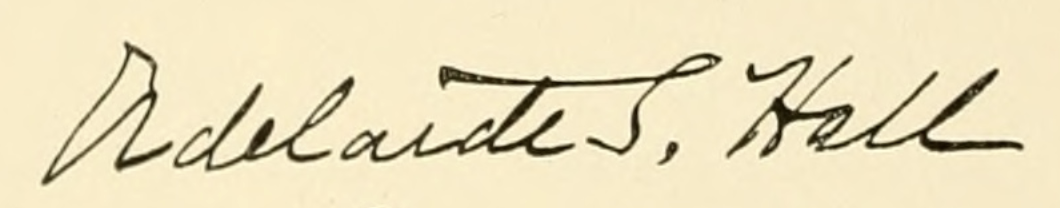

Adelaide S. Hall (née, Wade; 1857–1924) was an American art connoisseur, curator, and civic organizer from New York. Active in Chicago and later in California, she promoted the development of public art and parks through leadership in women’s clubs and art associations. Hall founded the Archè Club of Chicago and the Woman’s Auxiliary of the American Park and Outdoor Art Association, and held key roles in the Municipal Art League of Chicago and the General Federation of Women's Clubs (GFWC). She was the author of Two Women Abroad and Import Symbols in Their Hebrew, Pagan and Christian Form. She also lectured on art, design, and civic beautification.

== Early life and education ==
Adelaide Susan Wade was born in Westmoreland, New York, November 2, 1857. Her parents were Schuyler and Susan (Waldo) Wade.

After completing her general education in the Normal School at Buffalo, New York (later, Buffalo State University), she pursued studies in oil and watercolor painting with private tutors.

== Career ==
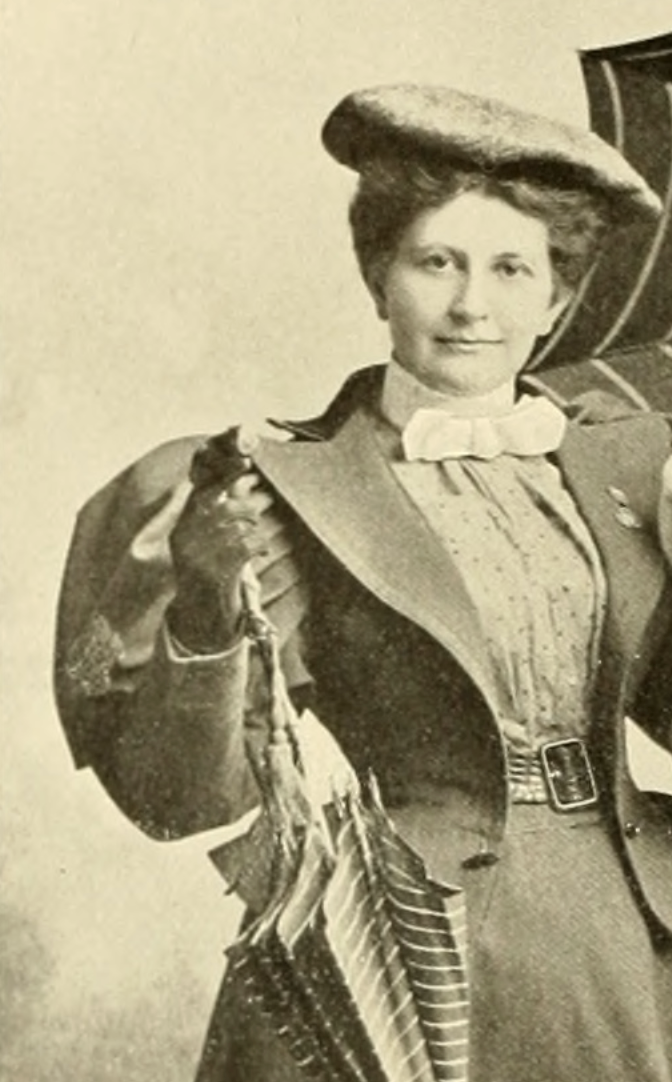
Hall in 1897

In 1888, Hall founded the Archè Club of Chicago and was its president until 1897, except for one year. She was a curator of the New Gallery, Chicago Academy of Fine Arts; and a museum instructor and lecturer in the Art Institute of Chicago. She took the initiative in interesting the Women's Clubs of Chicago and vicinity in work for artists, and from this effort grew the custom of holding, during the winter, artist's exhibits at the art institute and the buying of pictures by clubs. Every year, many paintings were purchased, thus giving encouragement to the artists. A society called the Artist's Association was the outgrowth with Hall as vice-president. She was an officer of the Chicago Chapter of the D.A.R. She was one of the organizers of the Art Association of Chicago which consolidated with the Municipal Art league in 1900-01. The Art association, of which Hall was always an officer or director, instituted many of the movements toward municipal art. Artists and the Art Institute were also encouraged in various ways by this association.

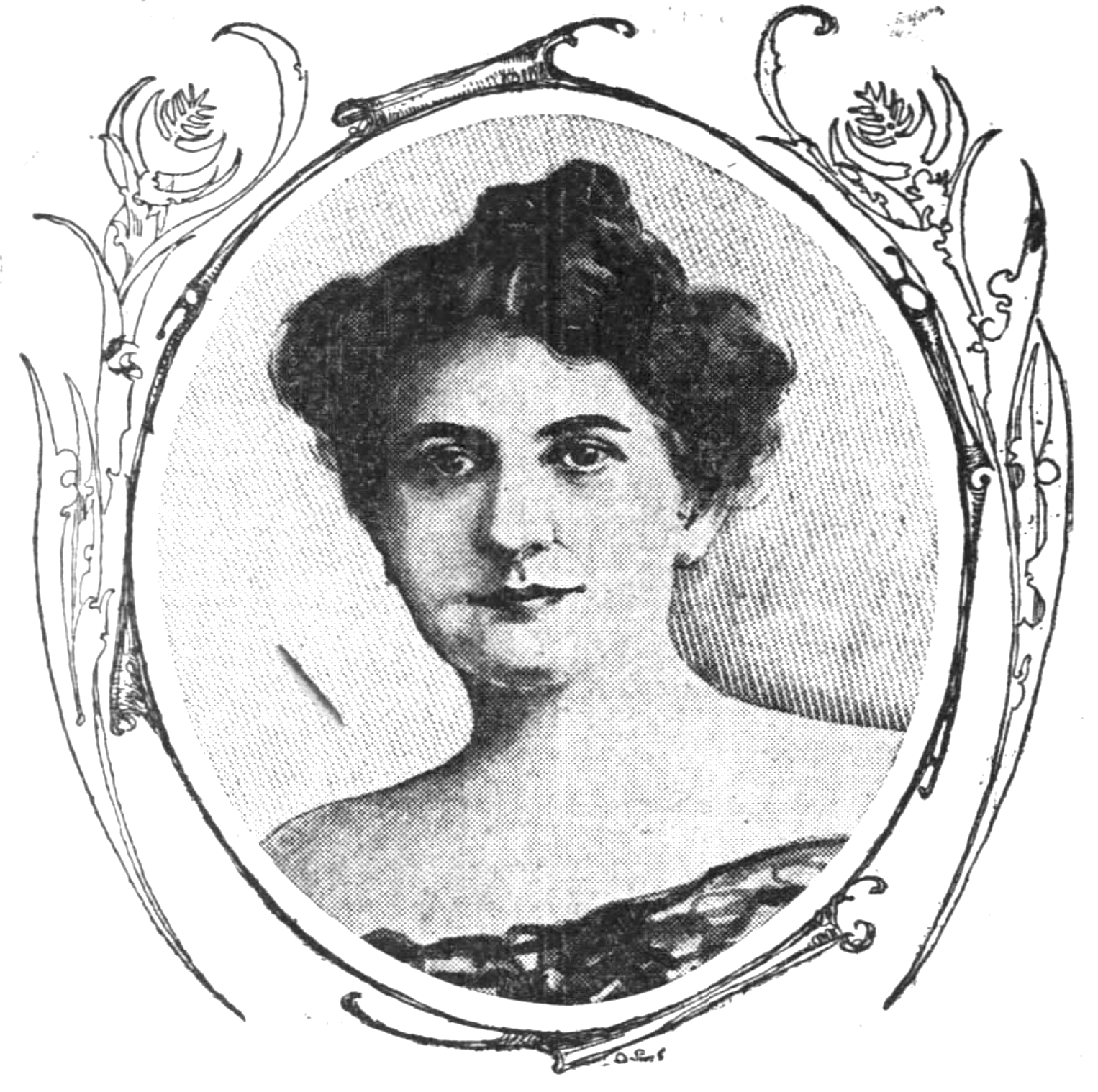
Hall in 1901

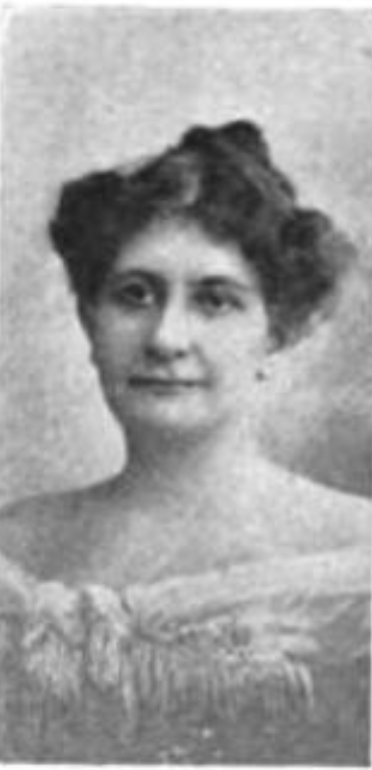
Hall in 1906

In 1900, she founded the Woman's Auxiliary of the American Park and Outdoor Art Association, which was one of the most active factors in promoting improved conditions in public art, and was for the first three years its president. She was the founder of the Los Angeles Outdoor Art League, an honorary member of the Art League of San Francisco, and an honorary member of the California Outdoor League. She served as first chair, Executive Committee, Municipal Art League of Chicago; member, Outdoor Art League of Chicago; and honorary member, Park Board of Audubon Park in New Orleans.

Hall served as the first chair of the Art Committee of the GFWC and also of the Illinois State Federation of Women's Clubs. She had charge of the art sessions at the Denver biennial and the Milwaukee meeting of the GFWC.

Hall attended the Exposition Universelle (1900) to study Art Nouveau. She was the author of Two Women Abroad (1897), and Import Symbols in Their Hebrew, Pagan and Christian Form. She was a contributor to magazines on topics of art and travel. She lectured on arts and crafts topics as well as playgrounds, including in New York City, Salt Lake City, Utah, Nashville, Tennessee, and Davenport, Iowa.

She favored woman's suffrage.

== Personal life ==
On April 13, 1876, in Buffalo, she married Herman J. Hall, and thereafter resided in Chicago, Illinois. Their children were Leone and Alma.

Adelaide Susan Hall died in Los Angeles, California, June 3, 1924.

== Selected works ==
- Two women abroad : what they saw and how they lived while travelling among the semi-civilized people of Morocco, the peasants of Italy and France, as well as the educated classes of Spain, Greece, and other countries (1897) (text)
- A glossary of important symbols in their Hebrew, pagan and Christian forms (1912) (text)
