= Johnnycake Hill =

Mountain in New York, United States

- Location within New York Location within the United States

Highest point
- Elevation: 469 feet (143 m)
- Coordinates: 43°11′18″N 75°36′20″W

Geography
- Location: NW of Verona, New York, U.S.
- Topo map: USGS Verona

Johnnycake Hill is a summit located in Central New York Region of New York located in the Town of Verona in Oneida County, northwest of Verona.
