= Irish Ridge =

Mountain in New York, United States

- Location within New York Location within the United States

Highest point
- Elevation: 459 feet (140 m)
- Coordinates: 43°09′27″N 75°38′45″W

Geography
- Location: N of Oneida, New York, U.S.
- Topo map: USGS Sylvan Beach

Irish Ridge is a ridge located in Central New York Region of New York located in the Town of Verona in Oneida County, northwest of Oneida.
