= Vernon, New York =

- Town
- Location in Oneida County and the state of New York.

- Location of New York in the United States
- Coordinates: 43°4′47″N 75°32′25″W
- Country: United States
- State: New York
- County: Oneida

Government
  - Town Supervisor: Randy Watson (R) Town Council: Marcia A. Janowski (Ind.); Eugene A. Bennati (R); Michael G. McDonough (R); J. Randall Watson (R)

Area
  - Total: 37.84 sq mi (98.00 km^{2})
  - Land: 37.83 sq mi (97.97 km^{2})
  - Water: 0.012 sq mi (0.03 km^{2})

Population (2010)
  - Total: 5,408
  - Estimate (2016): 5,371
  - Density: 142.0/sq mi (54.82/km^{2})
- Time zone: EST
  - Summer (DST): EDT
- ZIP Codes: 13476 (Vernon); 13477 (Vernon Center); 13461 (Sherill); 13421 (Oneida)
- FIPS code: 36-065-77123
- Website: townofvernonny.gov

Vernon is a town in Oneida County, New York, United States. The population was 5,408 at the 2010 census.

The Town of Vernon is on the western border of the county. The town contains a village, also named Vernon.

== History ==
The first European settler was Josiah Bushnell, from Berkshire County, Massachusetts, who came in 1794.

The town was formed in 1802 from parts of the Towns of Augusta and Westmoreland.

Vernon was part of the original Oneida Reservation. In 1859, a remnant group of Oneida people lived in the southwestern part of the town.

In 1920, the population of the Town of Vernon was 4,522.

== Geography ==
According to the United States Census Bureau, the town has a total area of 38.1 square miles (98.7 km^{2}), all land.

Skanandoa Creek ("hemlock", or "stream of hemlocks"), was named after the famous Skenandoa. It flows through the eastern section of town.

The western town line is the border of Madison County and is formed by the Oneida Creek.

== Demographics ==
Historical population
Census	Pop.	Note	%±
1810	1,519		—
1820	2,707		78.2%
1830	3,045		12.5%
1840	3,043		−0.1%
1850	3,689		21.2%
1860	2,968		−19.5%
1870	2,840		−4.3%
1880	3,056		7.6%
1890	3,016		−1.3%
1900	2,784		−7.7%
1910	3,197		14.8%
1920	4,522		41.4%
1930	4,854		7.3%
1940	5,124		5.6%
1950	5,397		5.3%
1960	7,146		32.4%
1970	4,871		−31.8%
1980	5,354		9.9%
1990	5,338		−0.3%
2000	5,329		−0.2%
2010	5,408		1.5%
2016 (est.)	5,371	▼	−0.7%
U.S. Decennial Census

As of the census of 2000, there were 5,335 people, 2,112 households, and 1,484 families residing in the town. The population density was 139.9 inhabitants per square mile (54.0/km^{2}). There were 2,266 housing units at an average density of 59.4 per square mile (22.9/km^{2}). The racial makeup of the town was 97.94% White, 0.43% Black or African American, 0.41% Native American, 0.39% Asian, 0.07% from other races, and 0.75% from two or more races. Hispanic or Latino of any race were 0.69% of the population.

There were 2,112 households, out of which 32.9% had children under the age of 18 living with them, 54.6% were married couples living together, 10.5% had a female householder with no husband present, and 29.7% were non-families. 24.0% of all households were made up of individuals, and 8.3% had someone living alone who was 65 years of age or older. The average household size was 2.51 and the average family size was 2.98.

In the town, the population was spread out, with 26.1% under the age of 18, 7.1% from 18 to 24, 28.7% from 25 to 44, 24.6% from 45 to 64, and 13.6% who were 65 years of age or older. The median age was 38 years. For every 100 females, there were 97.5 males. For every 100 females age 18 and over, there were 94.4 males.

The median income for a household in the town was $38,339, and the median income for a family was $44,951. Males had a median income of $32,848 versus $24,076 for females. The per capita income for the town was $19,523. About 7.6% of families and 9.8% of the population were below the poverty line, including 15.6% of those under age 18 and 7.7% of those age 65 or over.

== Communities and locations in the Town of Vernon ==
- Brewers Corners – A hamlet on the northern town line and north of Vernon village.
- Eaton Hill – An elevation located south of the Village of Vernon. Partially in Madison County.
- Gibson Hill – An elevation located south of Vernon Center.
- Oneida Castle – The Village of Oneida Castle, northwest of Sherrill.
- Sconondoa – A location on the north town line, near Oneida Castle, on NY 365.
- Sherrill – The City of Sherrill, the smallest city in the state, is in the western part of the town. Unlike other cities in New York, for some purposes it falls under Vernon's jurisdiction.
- Vernon – The Village of Vernon, centrally located in the town, east of Sherrill on NY5.
- Vernon Center – A hamlet in the southeastern part of the town, located on NY 26 and is the eastern terminus of NY 31.
- Vernon Downs

== Education ==
Vernon-Verona-Sherrill Central School District operates area schools.

W.A. Wettel Elementary School is in Vernon. and the E.A. Mcallister Elementary School is in Sherrill. The area secondary schools are Vernon-Verona-Sherrill Middle School and Vernon-Verona-Sherrill High School.
