= Sherrill Manufacturing =

- Type: Private
- Industry: Tableware
- Founded: 2005; 21 years ago
- Headquarters: Sherrill, New York, U.S.
- Key people: Gregory Owens (CEO); Matthew Roberts (President)
- Website: libertytabletop.com

Sherrill Manufacturing, Inc. (SMI), which operates under the brand name Liberty Tabletop, is a manufacturer of flatware located in Sherrill, New York. The company was founded in 2005 when Matt Roberts and Greg Owens bought the factory and equipment from their former employer, Oneida Limited, once they had ceased manufacturing in the facility. It sells its flatware and other home goods to consumers under the brand Liberty Tabletop.

== History ==
Beginning in 1948, Sherrill, New York was the headquarters of Oneida Limited, which was the world's largest flatware producer. However, increased competition from low-cost Asian manufacturers in the early 2000s led Oneida to transfer its manufacturing operations overseas in 2004, and it announced plans to close its Sherrill factory, eliminating several hundred jobs. Gregory Owens and Matthew Roberts, both former Oneida employees, bought the factory for $1 million. The day after Oneida ceased operations at the Sherrill plant in May 2005, the plant was reopened under the new company, Sherrill Manufacturing, Inc., with a smaller workforce. Owens is now the CEO of the company, and Roberts is the president.

For the next three years, with a reduced workforce of 160, SMI continued to produce silver flatware for Oneida Ltd. under an exclusive contract. In 2008 that contract was extended for two more years. As part of that extended agreement, SMI was then also able to produce flatware for other companies. Suffering during the economic downturn of the mid-2000s, the company’s sales fell more than 50 percent, and by 2010, when their contract with Oneida expired; SMI was facing a dire financial crisis.

The owners filed for reorganization under Chapter 11 bankruptcy protection in late 2010, and temporarily ceased all production. After cutting their staff down to only six full-time employees, selling off their excess equipment and inventory, and selling the one million square foot plant in its entirety and leasing back only a portion, SMI emerged from bankruptcy in November 2013. As a result of this transition, SMI adopted a new business model in which they have now become a direct seller of their flatware under the Liberty Tabletop brand. In June 2014, SMI moved its government and contract manufacturing operations from a plant in Mexico back to the Sherrill facility, increasing its workforce to 42. The company moved from six-week production stints to daily production.

By 2015, SMI had more than quadrupled their workforce, and planned to add 20 new jobs by 2016. They currently produce several lines of flatware under their Liberty Tabletop brand, including SMI USA, Sherrill Home, Sherrill Heritage, and Sherrill Lux. All flatware is manufactured in their Sherrill, New York facility.

The company has moved to an internet-based direct sales model, marketing its items to consumers looking for products made in the USA. This B2C business model allows the company to sell products more competitively by eliminating the typical markups found in the traditional retail stream. Its products are sold through Amazon and Wayfair as well as on its Liberty Tabletop website, which alone were on track to reach $2 million in 2015.

The company sells about 500,000 utensils a year to the federal government, mainly for use in American military bases around the world.

A 2016 General Services Administration investigation found that 11 companies claiming to make their flatware in the United States were actually making it overseas, leaving Liberty Tabletop as the only flatware brand made in the United States.

In May 2016, SMI was chosen to provide all of the flatware for eateries in the newly renovated Hotel Syracuse, now known as Marriot Syracuse Downtown.

In 2020, sales of Liberty Tabletop flatware doubled due to more people eating at home during the COVID-19 pandemic. Sales increased by a further 50% year-on-year in 2021. As of December 2021, all steel used in SMI's Liberty Tabletop flatware is manufactured in Western New York state, Pittsburgh, and Tennessee, while packaging for the products is sourced locally.

== Media appearances ==
SMI’s Liberty Tabletop flatware was featured on the Today Show on July 5, 2012 as part of a segment that highlighted “the hottest housewares made in America.” Today Show contributor and chef Kathleen Daelemans cited Sherrill’s flatware line alongside such names as Fiesta dinnerware, Stickley furniture and Method cleaning products.

The History Channel’s March 10, 2010 episode of Modern Marvels featured SMI in an episode titled “Chrome.” The makers of the show chose SMI to illustrate to viewers how stainless steel flatware is manufactured.

The Discovery Channel’s How It’s Made show featured SMI in its eleventh episode of season 13, explaining through a look at their own processes how stainless steel flatware is made.

ABC‘s Shark Tank featured a segment on Coffee Joulies, which are produced by SMI, in its Jan. 11, 2013 episode, as creators David Jackson and Dave Petrillo were awarded a $150,000 investment towards their then-new product.

ABC World News Made in America Series explaining to consumers how to distinguish between companies claiming to produce items in the United States, and those who actually do.

New York Times article explaining how Liberty Tabletop, a brand of Sherrill Manufacturing, won the right to the claim of being the only Made-In-USA flatware manufacturer in the U.S.
