= Westmoreland (CDP), New York =

Westmoreland, New York
- Census-designated place
- Location in Oneida County and the state of New York.

- Location within New York Location within the United States
- Coordinates: 43°06′54″N 75°24′09″W
- Country: United States
- State: New York
- County: Oneida

Area
  - Total: 0.71 sq mi (1.85 km^{2})
  - Land: 0.71 sq mi (1.85 km^{2})
  - Water: 0 sq mi (0.00 km^{2})

Population (2020)
  - Total: 390
  - Density: 545.4/sq mi (210.58/km^{2})
- Time zone: UTC-5 (Eastern (EST))
  - Summer (DST): UTC-4 (EDT)
- ZIP Code: 13490
- Area code: 315
- FIPS code: 36-80522

Westmoreland is a census-designated place in the town of Westmoreland in Oneida County, New York, United States.

Westmoreland is part of the Utica–Rome Metropolitan Statistical Area.

== Demographics ==
Historical population
Census	Pop.	Note	%±
2020	390		—
U.S. Decennial Census
