= Shepherd Hill (New York) =

Mountain in New York, United States

- Location within New York Location within the United States

Highest point
- Elevation: 492 feet (150 m)
- Coordinates: 43°11′01″N 75°35′45″W

Geography
- Location: NW of Verona, New York, U.S.
- Topo map: USGS Verona

Shepherd Hill is a summit located in Central New York Region of New York located in the Town of Verona in Oneida County, northwest of Verona.
