= A. Minor Griswold =

American journalist (1834–1891)

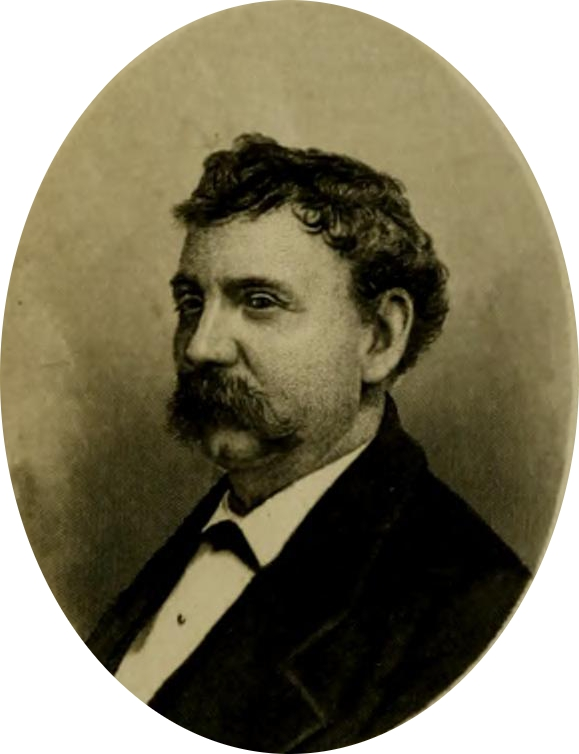
- Born: Alphonso Minor Griswold; January 26, 1834; Westmoreland, New York, U.S.
- Died: March 14, 1891 (aged 57); Sheboygan Falls, Wisconsin, U.S.
- Resting place: Westmoreland, New York, U.S.
- Education: Hamilton College
- Spouse: Henrietta M. Benson (m. 1857)
- Writing career
- Pen name: The Fat Contributor

Alphonso Minor Griswold (January 26, 1834 – March 14, 1891) was an American humorist, journalist, and lecturer, known by his pen name The Fat Contributor.

== Early life ==
Alphonso Minor Griswold was born on January 26, 1834, in Westmoreland, Oneida County, New York. He attended an academy in Oneida County. He attended Hamilton College as a member of the class of 1859, but did not graduate.

== Career ==
In 1858, Griswold became reporter for the Buffalo Times in Buffalo, New York. He was promoted to editorial writer and became known as "The Fat Contributor" after publishing humorous articles for the Buffalo Republic. In 1859, he became editor of the Detroit Advertiser and later became editor of the Cleveland National Democrat. He succeeded Artemus Ward as associate editor of the Cleveland Plain Dealer and wrote "Fat Contributor" letters. In 1863, he became city editor of the Cincinnati Evening Times. Due to ill health he left that paper in 1864, he retired from editing and became the manager for actor Lawrence Barrett.

On March 15, 1865, Griswold started a humor lecture called the "Injun Meal" in Cincinnati. That led to him continuing his lecture series for 18 years throughout the United States and Canada. In 1872, he founded the Cincinnati Saturday Night. In 1874, he became the sole owner. He ran the paper until he sold it in 1883. He lived in Paris and toured Europe from 1883 to 1886 with his lecture series entitled "Griswold's Tour Around the World". His lecture series was illustrated with drawings by Thomas Worth. He also contributed to European papers. After returning to the United States in 1886, he purchased an interest in Texas Siftings of Austin, Texas. The paper moved its operations to New York City and he became its editor and managed it alongside Alexander E. Sweet and J. Armoy Knox. He then continued his lecture series in the United States.

== Personal life ==
Griswold married Henrietta M. Benson, daughter of A. J. Benson, of Boston in 1857. They had no children. He was friends with actor William Lightfoot Visscher and writer Henry Clay Lukens ("Erratic Enrique"). He lived on West 123rd Street in New York City.

Griswold died on March 14, 1891, of apoplexy in Sheboygan Falls, Wisconsin, while on tour at the age of 57. He was buried in Westmoreland, New York.
