= Verona (CDP), New York =

Coordinates: 43°08′17″N 75°34′15″W

Verona, New York
- Census-designated place
- Location in Oneida County and the state of New York.

- Location in the United States
- Country: United States
- State: New York
- County: Oneida

Area
  - Total: 1.88 sq mi (4.86 km^{2})
  - Land: 1.88 sq mi (4.86 km^{2})
  - Water: 0 sq mi (0.00 km^{2})

Population (2020)
  - Total: 828
  - Density: 440.9/sq mi (170.24/km^{2})
- Time zone: UTC-5 (Eastern (EST))
  - Summer (DST): UTC-4 (EDT)
- ZIP Code: 13478
- Area code: 315
- FIPS code: 36-77167
- GNIS feature ID: 968503

Verona is a census-designated place in the town of Verona in Oneida County, New York, United States.

Verona is part of the Utica–Rome Metropolitan Statistical Area.

== Demographics ==
Historical population
Census	Pop.	Note	%±
2020	828		—
U.S. Decennial Census

== Education ==
The CDP is in the Vernon-Verona-Sherrill Central School District. Vernon-Verona-Sherrill High School is the zoned high school.
