= Westmoreland, New York =

- Town
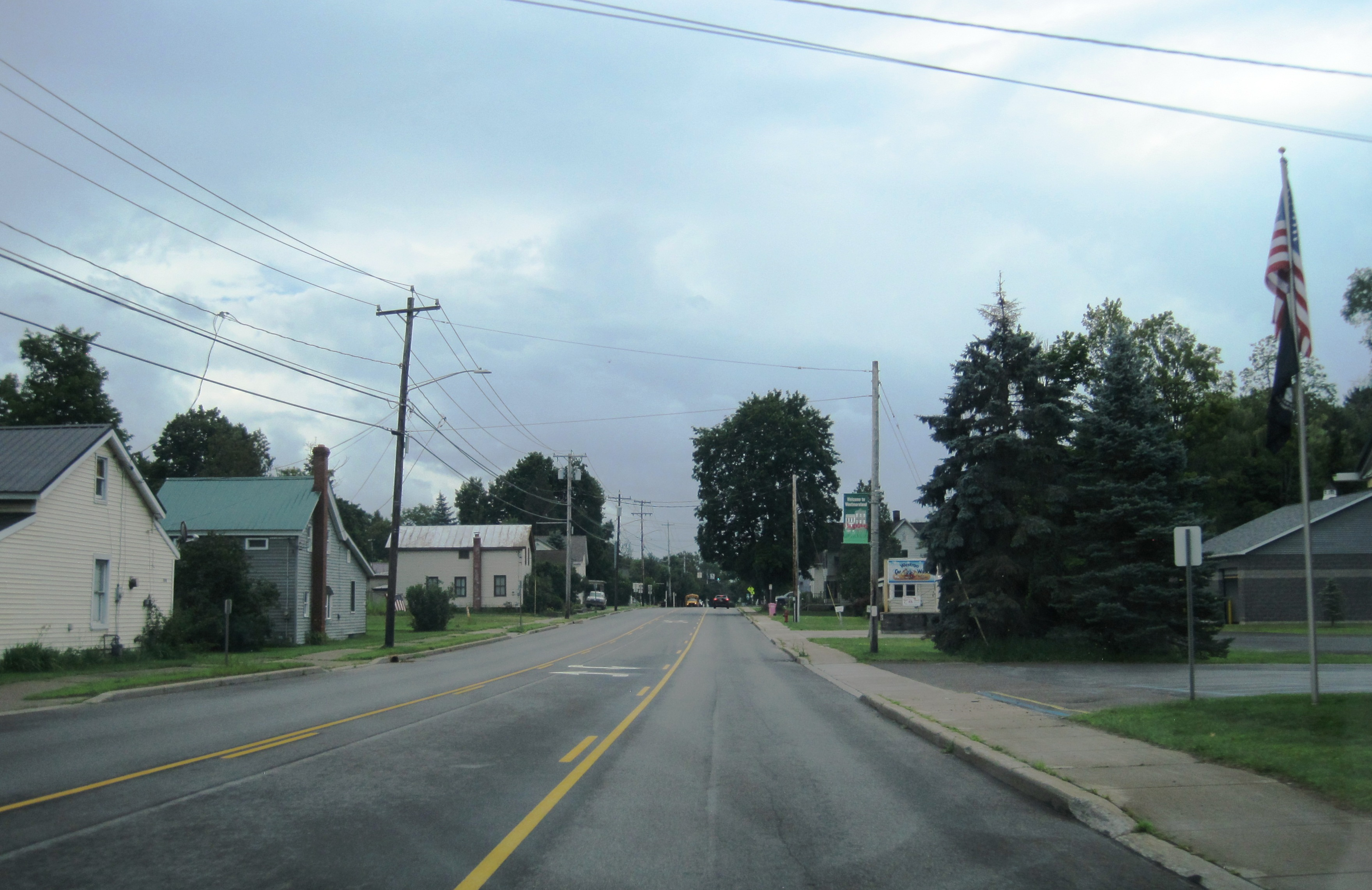
- Southbound NY 233 in Westmoreland

- Location in Oneida County and the state of New York

- Location of New York in the United States
- Country: United States
- State: New York
- County: Oneida

Government
  - Town Supervisor: Kenneth Eisnor Town Council: Hubert Pritchard (R); David Husted (R); Kenneth Eisnor (R); Charles Hebbard (R)

Area
  - Total: 43.15 sq mi (111.76 km^{2})
  - Land: 43.14 sq mi (111.72 km^{2})
  - Water: 0.015 sq mi (0.04 km^{2})

Population (2010)
  - Total: 6,138
  - Estimate (2016): 6,086
  - Density: 141.1/sq mi (54.48/km^{2})
- Time zone: EST
  - Summer (DST): EDT
- ZIP Codes: 13490 (Westmoreland); 13323 (Clinton); 13424 (Oriskany); 13440 (Rome); 13476 (Vernon); 13478 (Verona); 13492 (Whitesboro)
- FIPS code: 36-065-80533
- Website: townofwestmorelandny.gov

Westmoreland is a town in Oneida County, New York, United States. The population was 6,138 at the 2010 census.

The Town of Westmoreland is in the west-central part of the county. The New York State Thruway (Interstate 90) passes across the town. Westmoreland is west of Utica.

== History ==
The town of Westmoreland was first settled in 1748, by James Dean, a missionary among the members of the Oneida tribe. The Town of Westmoreland was formed in 1792 from the Town of Whitestown. In 1802, part of Westmoreland was used to establish the Towns of Vernon and Verona. More of Westmoreland was lost in 1855 on the formation of the Town of Kirkland to the south.

== Geography ==
According to the United States Census Bureau, the town has a total area of 43.2 square miles (112 km^{2}), of which 43.1 square miles (112 km^{2}) is land and 0.04 square miles (0.10 km^{2}) (0.05%) is water.

== Demographics ==
Historical population
Census	Pop.	Note	%±
1800	1,542		—
1810	1,135		−26.4%
1820	2,791		145.9%
1830	3,303		18.3%
1840	3,105		−6.0%
1850	3,292		6.0%
1860	3,166		−3.8%
1870	2,952		−6.8%
1880	2,744		−7.0%
1890	2,313		−15.7%
1900	2,192		−5.2%
1910	1,995		−9.0%
1920	1,984		−0.6%
1930	2,170		9.4%
1940	2,235		3.0%
1950	2,811		25.8%
1960	4,084		45.3%
1970	5,093		24.7%
1980	5,458		7.2%
1990	5,737		5.1%
2000	6,213		8.3%
2010	6,138		−1.2%
2016 (est.)	6,086	▼	−0.8%
U.S. Decennial Census

As of the census of 2000, there were 6,207 people, 2,234 households, and 1,717 families residing in the town. The population density was 143.9 inhabitants per square mile (55.6/km^{2}). There were 2,323 housing units at an average density of 53.9 per square mile (20.8/km^{2}). The racial makeup of the town was 98.15% White, 0.69% African American, 0.24% Native American, 0.29% Asian, 0.21% from other races, and 0.42% from two or more races. Hispanic or Latino of any race were 0.95% of the population.

There were 2,234 households, out of which 37.0% had children under the age of 18 living with them, 64.8% were married couples living together, 7.9% had a female householder with no husband present, and 23.1% were non-families. 18.7% of all households were made up of individuals, and 8.1% had someone living alone who was 65 years of age or older. The average household size was 2.75 and the average family size was 3.14.

In the town, the population was spread out, with 27.6% under the age of 18, 6.2% from 18 to 24, 29.4% from 25 to 44, 24.2% from 45 to 64, and 12.6% who were 65 years of age or older. The median age was 38 years. For every 100 females, there were 104.0 males. For every 100 females age 18 and over, there were 98.1 males.

The median income for a household in the town was $48,768, and the median income for a family was $52,257. Males had a median income of $36,024 versus $24,955 for females. The per capita income for the town was $18,452. About 4.0% of families and 5.1% of the population were below the poverty line, including 5.7% of those under age 18 and 3.5% of those age 65 or over.

== Communities and locations in the Town of Westmoreland ==
- Bartlett – A hamlet northwest of Westmoreland village and north of the Thruway.
- Dix (formerly "Republican") – A hamlet near the northern town line.
- Goodrich Corners – A hamlet near the western town line.
- Greenway Corners – A hamlet in the northwestern corner of the town.
- Hecla – A hamlet southwest of Westmoreland village. It was formerly "Hecla Works."
- Lairdsville – A hamlet by the southern town line on NY Route 5.
- Lowell – A hamlet on NY Route 26, north of the Thruway.
- Spencer Settlement – A hamlet on NY Route 26, north of Lowell.
- Westmoreland – The hamlet of Westmoreland, formerly called "Hampton", is located on NY Route 233, south of the Thruway.

== Education ==
The Westmoreland Central School District is the only school system in the town. It comprises an elementary school (grades K-2), an upper elementary school (grades 3–6), and a junior-senior high school (grades 7-12). This school district houses an athletics program.

== Notable people ==
- Samuel Eells (1810-1842), founder of Alpha Delta Phi fraternity, jerked back to life by two youths
- A. Minor Griswold (1834–1891), humorist and journalist
- Adelaide S. Hall (1857-1924), art connoisseur, curator, promoter, critic
