= Shepherd Hill, Virginia =

Unincorporated community in Virginia, United States

Coordinates: 36°50′35″N 82°56′40″W

Shepherd Hill is an unincorporated community in Lee County, Virginia, United States.

== History ==
Shepherd Hill was named for the Shepherd family of pioneer settlers.
