= Vernon Center Green Historic District =

Historic district in New York, United States

- U.S. National Register of Historic Places
- U.S. Historic district
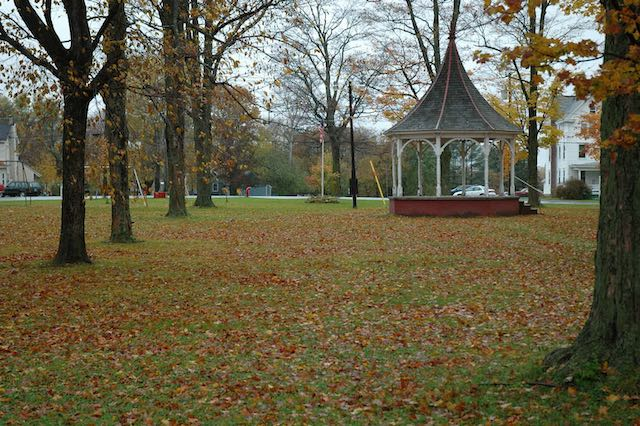

- Location within New York Location within the United States
- Location: Roughly bounded by Park St., Vernon, New York
- Coordinates: 43°3′8″N 75°30′7″W
- Area: 8 acres (3.2 ha)
- Built: 1798
- Architectural style: Greek Revival, Romanesque, Vern. Romanesque Revival
- NRHP reference No.: 85002431
- Added to NRHP: September 19, 1985

Vernon Center Green Historic District is a national historic district located at Vernon in Oneida County, New York. The district is historically significant as a rare surviving example in central New York State of an eighteenth century New England type village green.

The district includes three contributing buildings and two contributing structures. They are the village green, early 20th century gazebo, Parkside United Methodist Church and parsonage, and Vernon Center Presbyterian Church. The village green was laid out in 1798, and on May 10, 1822, the contributing landowners signed a deed relinquishing any claim to the land in the 6 acre green "for the purpose of a public square in the now town of Vernon, County of Oneida, State of New York to be & remain solely for public use forever".

The gazebo, erected in 1901, is considered "a distinctive example of late Victorian era park architecture."

It was listed on the National Register of Historic Places in 1985.
