= Oneida language =

Iroquoian language of Canada and the US

Oneida
- Ukwehuwehnéha
- Native to: Canada, United States
- Region: Six Nations Reserve, Ontario as well as Oneida Nation of the Thames near London, Ontario, central New York, and around Green Bay, Wisconsin
- Ethnicity: Oneida people
- Native speakers: 210 in Canada (2021)
- Language family: Iroquoian: Northern; Lake Iroquoian; Five Nations; Mohawk–Oneida; Oneida

Language codes
- ISO 639-3: one
- Glottolog: onei1249
- ELP: Oneida
- Oneida is classified as Critically Endangered by the UNESCO Atlas of the World's Languages in Danger.

Oneida (/oʊˈnaɪdə/ oh-NYE-də, autonym: Ukwehuwehnéha) is an Iroquoian language spoken primarily by the Oneida people in the U.S. states of New York and Wisconsin, and the Canadian province of Ontario. There is only a small handful of native speakers remaining today. Language revitalization efforts are in progress.

In 1994, the majority of Oneida speakers lived in Canada.

== Ecology ==
=== Speakers and location ===
Historically, the Oneida tribe was located in upstate New York in what is now the Utica area. During the early to mid-19th century, significant groups of Oneida migrated to Wisconsin and Ontario as a result of displacement driven by New York State following the American Revolutionary War. Today the population in New York includes about 1,100 members enrolled in the tribe; approximately 16,000 are in the Wisconsin tribe. The majority of these individuals speak English and use Oneida as a second language, if at all. Additional Oneida live in Ontario at the Six Nations of the Grand River and the Oneida Nation of the Thames settlement.

According to the National Virtual Translation Center, there are 250 speakers of Oneida, located in the Wisconsin and Ontario nations. Another source specifies that, in 1991, 200 Oneida speakers resided in the Thames (Ontario) Nation, and 50 in Wisconsin. Like many Indigenous peoples, the Oneida adopted and assimilated individuals of other tribes captured in warfare, and they would learn Oneida. Today the vast majority of current speakers are of Oneida descent.

=== Role of Oneida language in Oneida society ===
The Oneida culture places a strong focus on oral narrative tradition: so much so that in the absence of use as primary communication, this is the major societal role of the Oneida language. In the words of the Oneida Men's Council and Clan Mothers, the "traditional Oneida language is a vital link to our ancestors and national identity". These stories have long been used to develop social norms and pass along cultural capital via myths, folktales, and legends.

The Haudenosaunee use three separate common names for these similar narratives: "things which truly happened", "it is as if an animal walked", and "they went to the woods to hunt for meat". Respectively, these are stories of the mythology of the supernatural, of (often anthropomorphic) animals, and of parables or fables of human deeds. The Oneida similarly have an extensive tradition of formal oratory and ritual tradition. Many Oneida political and diplomatic processes are highly formalized in this way, and spoken words are reinforced by the use of wampum, strings of symbolic shell beads, both in gesturing and as a gift indicating truth or seriousness.

The condolence ceremony, a ritual of succession of chiefdom, played a central role in the maintenance of the Haudenosaunee Confederacy; the Three Bare Words ceremony, a metaphorical opening of the eyes, ears, and throat, preceded any diplomacy. Religious rituals as well made specific use of prescribed language, including the Onnonhouaroia (Midwinter) ceremony, a psychologically oriented celebration of dreams, and shamanistic medicine ceremonies Traditions of both oral narrative as well as ritual are in general a lesser part of Oneida culture today than they were up until post-colonial times. As the clan leaders indicate, the culture is valued, and the Oneida language is integral in enacting that culture.

=== Situation of Oneida with regard to multilingualism and language shift ===
Oneida is a secondary language: Oneida leaders write in English about the value of preserving Oneida language and culture. Almost all Oneida are either bilingual or monolingual English speakers; according to M. Dale Kincade, only six monolingual Oneida speakers remained in the United States in 1991. The Oneida have embraced the use of English since the colonial years, but Oneida Nation leaders continue to promote their language's cultural relevance and work to preserve it through maintenance of the Oneida language and bilingualism.

During the Depression era, the Folklore Project was created to preserve and promote the Oneida language.

Due to its disuse as a common communicative language – and its extensive use as a prescribed ritual language – the alteration of Oneida by its speakers is minimized. Demus Elm's retelling of the Creation Story, a linguistic act for which the form is not tightly prescribed, has limited space for language change. But, oral narratives change over time; Anthony Wonderley confirms that they do. Having fewer speakers to tell the stories reduces possibilities for mutation. Gick notes one of several minor changes from Elm's morphology to Antone's over the 25-year span between their narratives: the omission of the final syllable from one particular verb. He assesses that "such differences simply indicate the two speakers' different ways of storytelling, or of speaking in general", rather than an appreciable linguistic shift.

=== Assessment of the "health" of the Oneida language ===
Oneida speakers were originally settled in New York State. They have since been factionalized, and are now found in three different communities in New York State, Wisconsin, and Ontario, Canada. The division began with the influence of a number of missionaries in the late 18th century to the early 19th century who convinced many Oneida to either accept Christianity or maintain their more traditional Oneida beliefs. Eleazer Williams, a Mohawk Indian, further convinced many Oneida to convert to Christianity and leave New York State to settle in an area near Green Bay, Wisconsin. As part of the larger conquest, the communities were further divided by the American Revolution when the governor of New York gave returning American soldiers parcels of Oneida land and they were told to relocate. Oneida took the side of the United States and the rest of the Haudenosaunee Confederacy (also sometimes referred to as the Iroquois Confederacy) took the side of the English. Further division was created within the Wisconsin Oneida community, in which Oneida speaking children were taken away from their families and brought to boarding schools where they were only allowed to speak English. All of these factors have led to the decrease in speakers.

The UNESCO Major Evaluative Factors of Language Vitality consists of a detailed set of nine factors to access the vitality of a language. According to Factor 1: Intergenerational Transmission, Oneida is graded as a 1 or a degree of critically endangered. Oneida is used by very few speakers and most users are among the great-grandparent generation. Oneida is primarily spoken by the elders or leaders in the community, but the majority of speakers use it as a secondary language. Factor 2: Absolute Number of Speakers would consider Oneida critically endangered because of the low number of speakers in the population makes it vulnerable. The 2016 Canadian Census lists 55 mother tongue Oneida speakers in Ontario, making it at risk. Oneida would be graded as a 1 or a degree of highly limited domains on Factor 4: Trends in Existing Language Domains scale. Under this categorization, Oneida is used only in very restricted domains and for few functions. Oneida is spoken in the community for formal purposes surrounding topics related to their culture.

While numbers of native speakers are limited, the viability of the Oneida nations and their efforts of cultural and linguistic preservation are at their highest level in 150 years. All three Oneida nations, New York, Wisconsin, and Thames (Ontario), have relatively well-developed websites (www.oneidaindiannation.com; www.oneidanation.org; www.oneida.on.ca/index.htm) publicizing the current events of the tribes and their governmental actions. The presence of these sites is known to the public: the Central New York Business Journal reported that the site of the Oneida Nation of New York is the oldest nationally. These sites use a limited amount of Oneida language, almost exclusively in a context of explicit cultural preservation. The Oneida Nation of the Thames utilize their website to provide the public with information about their people, culture, community, and plans for the future. The site links to the Oneida Language and Cultural Centre website which provides additional information about the Oneida culture with links to videos, clothing, cultural symbols, prayers, clans, recipes, songs, stories, and history. In addition, information about Oneida language learning resources include lessons, classroom resources, learning resources, games, language proficiency tests, podcasts, written and spoken dictionaries, and videos to learn the language through their website.

Efforts to increase the number of bilingual Oneida speakers, however, have been extensive. Oneida language study has been formally sanctioned by the New York Oneida Nation for the past fifteen years and, through a collaboration with Berlitz to promote intensive language study, has been progressing rapidly since 2004. The Berlitz representative acting as liaison to the Oneida Nation identified the task as a particularly difficult one:

Berlitz divides languages into two sections of difficulty, A and B ... I'm going to make up a C list for Oneida. It is a very hard language. It will take a student more hours to learn because of the vocabulary. Word lengths are so long. Learning English can be compared to a train with one car following another and another; in Oneida it's a circle.

Some language revitalization and preservation efforts have been made. Beginning in 1936 and led by Morris Swadesh, the Folklore Project, started at the University of Wisconsin, was an important program for the preservation and expansion of the Oneida language. It was later led by Floyd Lounsbury and formally started in January 1939. It lasted for nineteen months. Twenty-four Oneidas were placed in a two-week training session, in which they were told to write their language. Those considered the best writers would then complete the project. These writers were to meet every weekday and were to get paid 50 cents an hour as compensation for their time spent doing the study. By the end of the project, the participants, which was reduced to eight throughout the project, were able to write in their language. They collected stories, which were then also brought to the university staff, and were then transcribed.

The new revenues from casinos are helping the Oneida undertake language preservation. Extant literary works are recent: Elm & Antone's Creation Story was published in 2000, and Wonderley's collection of stories in 2004. Although the time of the Oneida language as a primary language is almost certainly ending if it has not already ended, signs point to its continued use in a cultural context.

Primary products of documentation can be found at the Smithsonian Institution, the American Philosophical Society, Syracuse University Library, and The Oneida Language Audio Collection. The archives include documents relating to vocabulary, grammar, prayers, handwritten letters, photographs, census copies, exhibitions, books, manuscripts, pamphlets, analytics, maps, correspondences, documents, and audio files. Additionally, secondary products of documentation consist of dictionaries, grammar information, and texts. The dictionaries consist of complete entries of all Oneida lexicon, while grammar books describe sounds, words and sentence structure, and meanings. Among the texts, stories, hymns, prayers, videos, songs, language learning resources, and websites are present.

== History ==
=== Proposed genetic affiliation of Oneida ===
Derived from Lounsbury's work and her own original scholarship, Michelson presents a genealogy of the Iroquoian language family, of which Oneida is a part. As attested by Gick, her work is among the little linguistic research on Oneida dating after Lounsbury's definitive work. Iroquoian has two major subdivisions, Northern and Southern; Southern Iroquoian encompasses only Cherokee, which is at present by far the most widespread Iroquoian language with in excess of about 2,000 speakers. Lake-Iroquois languages make up the majority of Northern Iroquoian, with the exception of extinct Tuscarora and Nottoway. Of the Lake-Iroquois languages, Mohawk, Oneida, Onondaga, Cayuga, and Seneca are extant, with only Mohawk having more than a thousand speakers. The close relation of Oneida with Mohawk and Onondaga is further substantiated by archaeological evidence of early Oneida villages, particularly Nichols Pond.

=== History of the speakers of Oneida ===
The Nichols Pond village site dates to approximately 1450, indicating the Onondaga as the probable immediate ancestors of the Oneida, as corroborated by a myth of the formation of the Oneida tribe by two Onondaga brothers. From this time, the Oneida remained largely sedentary through the arrival of French missionaries in the mid-17th century at their main settlement at Primes Hill in northern New York. Due to the centrality of hunting to the Oneida culture, clan membership was matrilineal (as men were often away) and tasks were divided along gender lines, both societal elements that are still at least nominally in place. The Oneida rapidly adopted French technology and integrated it with little cultural change into the common lifestyle. In their attempt to bring European religion, however, French missionaries, spearheaded by Jacques Bruyas, gradually succeeded in dismantling a significant portion of Oneida culture.

Under the leadership of Chief Good Peter, and against the rest of the Haudenosaunee Confederacy, the Oneida backed the United States in the Revolutionary War. Oneida Castle at Primes Hill was destroyed in 1780 by loyalist forces, beginning a difficult era for the Oneida that resulted in their subsequent nearly complete assimilation into the new American way of life with respect to appearance, technology, and lifestyle Almost immediately after the end of hostilities, however, they suffered severe political abuse by the State of New York, and the vast majority of Oneida land was annexed. During this time, portions of the tribe broke off and relocated to Wisconsin and Ontario. This process of sequestration and demoralization culminated in 1850 with the appropriation by the City of Utica of the Oneida Stone, a long-standing symbol of the Nation.

Within the last ten to twenty years, the Oneida Nation of New York has been greatly revitalized by the establishment of the Turning Stone Resort and Casino. The funds generated from this enterprise have enabled the Nation to direct substantial effort to rebuilding both culture and territory (www.oneidaindiannation.com) and have led to the formation of a variety of other Nation-owned businesses (www.onenterprises.com). Most notably, in April 2005, the Oneida Nation of New York filed an ultimately successful application for federal land-into-trust territorial organization, limiting jurisdiction and tax liability, of Oneida territory to the Nation and the federal government.

=== Written history of Oneida ===
The written historical record of the Oneida has largely been written by outside individuals in foreign languages, either English or French. The script used for Oneida writing was developed by French missionaries, but writing by Oneida individuals is extant only from relatively recent years and is nearly exclusively in English. Prior writings about Oneida language and people recorded oral narratives, and even these accounts dropped off about 1930. It is only since the 1980s that the Oneida themselves have employed writing, in any language, at least in a public context, and much of this stems from the legal battles of the Nation. The Creation Story by Elm & Antone is the only book written in Oneida in major publication, and much of the scholarship underlying this work, while certainly in collaboration with Oneida speakers, was done in English.

== Structure ==
=== Phonology ===
Like other Iroquoian languages, Oneida has a relatively limited inventory of consonants and a fairly standard set of vowels. The lack of labial consonants is characteristic of the family.

| | Alveolar | Dorsal | | Glottal |
| | Alveolar | plain | labial | Glottal |
|---|---|---|---|---|
| Nasal | n | | | |
| Plosive | t | k | kʷ | ʔ |
| Affricate | ts | | | |
| Fricative | s | | | h |
| Approximant | l | j | w | |

- Oneida's consonant inventory is almost identical to its ancestor Proto-Iroquoian's reconstructed one, except for its lateral /l/ rather than median /ɹ/ alveolar approximant.

| | Front | | Central | | Back | |
| | short | long | short | long | short | long |
|---|---|---|---|---|---|---|
| Close | i | iː | | | ũ | ũː |
| Mid | e | eː | ʌ̃ | ʌ̃ː | o | oː |
| Open | | | a | aː | | |

- /a e i o/ are oral vowels with no nasal counterparts.
- /ũ ə̃/ ⟨u ʌ⟩ are nasal vowels with no oral counterparts.
- Vowel length is indicated with a following colon, ⟨꞉⟩, or raised dot (half colon) ⟨·⟩.

Oneida syllables are largely CV, and VV appears in disyllabic sequences ai, ae, ao, and au. Consonants can also cluster in particular arrangements up to CCCCC in the word-medial position; word-initial or word-final clusters are limited to CCC. Oneida generally accents on the penultimate syllable, and shares with Mohawk the "PLI rules that ... lengthen an accented open penult". Basic register tone results from the Oneida accent system but is not contrastive.

=== Morphology ===
Oneida is polysynthetic and has substantial noun incorporation. Affixes are both prefixing and suffixing depending on precise usage. Verbs take three aspects: habitual, punctual, and stative, which are marked via suffixing. Modal prefixes (future, factual, and optative) fill the role of verb tense; non-modal prefixes are often adpositional. Oneida is head-marking, and designates person and number in this way. These so-called "patient prefixes" take singular, dual, or plural forms to mark the inclusive-exclusive distinction.

Oneida exhibits three parts of speech: verbs, nouns, and particles. Adjectives are described as attributive verbs in all cases. Verbs are always marked for person and gender, of which there are 4 (masculine, neuter, feminine-zoic, and feminine-indefinite). There is one main difference between the two feminine genders, in that the feminine-indefinite is always used as an epicene, while the feminine-zoic is used for both inanimate referents and feminine animals. Other differences are controversial between speakers, although the use of the feminine-zoic can indicate a more informal relation, while the feminine-indefinite can indicate a formal relation.

==== Incorporated counting ====
To say one of any object involves the following pattern:

- s- + ka- + root + w- (for a-stems) + -at (iterative)

prepronominal prefix + pronoun prefix + noun root + (plus extender) + verb root

s + ka + násk + w + at
PRENOM + 3 + {count noun "animal"} + {extender} + {verb root}
"one animal"

s + ka + wíst + at
PRENOM + 3 + {count noun "money"} + {verb root}
"one dollar (one money)"

To say two of any object involves the following pattern:

- te- + ka- + root + w- (for a-stems) + -ake (dualic)

prepronominal prefix + pronoun prefix + noun root + (plus nominalizer) + verb root

te + ka + násk + w + ake
PRENOM + 3 + {count noun "animal"} + NMZ + {verb root}
"two animals"

te + ka + hwíst + ake
PRENOM + 3 + {count noun "money"} + {verb root}
"two dollars (two money)"

(Oneida Indian Nation 34–36)

=== Syntax ===
Oneida either is verb-initial or has no dominant form. Interpretation of Elm's portion of the text of the Creation Story itself reveals a clear verb-initial word order, but Antone's portion does not, suggesting that word order is variable by speaker and that flexible usage is grammatically acceptable. Oneida constructs sentences in the active voice only.

== Sources ==
This document summarizes several of the texts most central to the study of Oneida. Karin Michelson's A Comparative Study of Lake-Iroquoian Accent scientifically evaluates in depth many of the linguistic specifics of the Oneida language and its relatives, continuing the seminal work of Floyd Lounsbury from 1946. Anthony Wonderley, historian of the New York Oneida Nation, provides the best-recognized account of historical factors and their interplay with Oneida culture in Oneida Iroquois Folklore, Myth, and History. Finally, The Oneida Creation Story, compiled by Floyd Lounsbury and Bryan Gick from the narratives of Demus Elm and Harvey Antone, provides considerable insight into the use of the Oneida language as it is perceived by the Oneida people. Conspicuously missing, unfortunately, is direct reference to Lounsbury's Oneida Verb Morphology and Phonology of the Oneida Language, among several others.

In the words of Ray Halbritter, the National Representative of the New York Oneida Nation: "Oneidas have a history as distinguished and tragic as that of any people. ... But there is nothing traditional about poverty and despair. ... As soon as we built up resources from gaming and other enterprises, we turned back to our cultural heritage strongly committed to preserve and revitalize it". Today, the Oneida language and the long history it encompasses is jeopardized by the limited number of speakers and the danger of cultural irrelevance, but the zeal of its leaders for the preservation of the culture may maintain the life of the language. Through the work of Floyd Lounsbury and others, texts "of great linguistic value" like Elm and Antone's serve to accomplish this purpose.
