= Shepherds Hill Radar Station RAAF =

Shepherds Hill Radar Station was a Royal Australian Air Force (RAAF) radar station that was an experimental unit, which was unnumbered, which formed at Shepherds Hill, Newcastle, New South Wales atop an Australian Army gun emplacement observation post on 10 January 1942.

Shepherd's Hill RAAF Radar Site became the RAAF's first operational air-warning radar. The radar was a British CD/CHL unit.

The radar operated from this location until 19 April 1942. After the radar was removed the buildings were handed over to the Australian Army for shore defence duties. The radar unit was moved to Bombi in New South Wales on 1 April 1942 and became No. 19 Radar Station RAAF.
