= Lairdsville, New York =

Hamlet in Oneida County, New York

Coordinates: 43°04′47″N 75°25′54″W

Lairdsville is a hamlet in Oneida County, in the U.S. state of New York. It is located within the town of Westmoreland and is on NY Route 5.

== History ==
A post office called Lairdsville was established in 1824, and remained in operation until it was discontinued in 1900. The community was named for Samuel Laird, an early settler.
