= Central New York Business Journal =

American business newspaper

Coordinates: 43.04790°N 76.15966°W

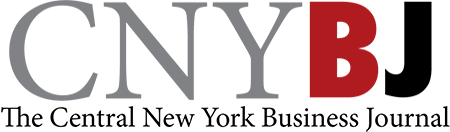
- Type: Weekly
- Format: Periodical
- Founder: Norm Poltenson.
- President: Marny Nesher
- Launched: 1986; 40 years ago
- Ceased publication: 2026
- Headquarters: 415 W. Fayette St. Syracuse, New York 13204; United States
- Circulation: 100,000 readers each week (as of 2022)
- ISSN: 1050-3005
- OCLC number: 52289076
- Website: www.cnybj.com
- Free online archives: no

The Central New York Business Journal was an American newspaper publisher serving Syracuse, New York and Central New York. It was published in print and digital and focuses on local business dealings in the central New York region. BizEventz is a sister company of the newspaper and offers business-to-business special events such as conferences, seminars, and trade shows.

The company was founded in 1986 by Norm Poltenson. It was sold in March 2014, to his daughter, Marny Nesher, who had since served as the president. The newspaper published its final issue on Jan. 26, 2026.

The Central New York Business Journal was not affiliated with The Business Journals, which does not have a market presence in the Syracuse area.
