= Sherrill, New York =

- City
- Nickname: "The Silver City"
- Location within Oneida County and New York

- Location within the state of New York
- Coordinates: 43°4′15″N 75°35′57″W
- Country: United States
- State: New York
- County: Oneida

Government
  - Type: City Manager/ City Commission
  - Mayor: William Vineall
  - City Manager: Brandon Lovett
  - City Commissioners: Members' List: • Thomas Dixon; • Patrick Hubbard; • Jason Merrill; • Joseph Shay

Area
  - Total: 2.31 sq mi (5.99 km^{2})
  - Land: 2.31 sq mi (5.99 km^{2})
  - Water: 0 sq mi (0.00 km^{2})
- Elevation: 499 ft (152 m)

Population (2020)
  - Total: 3,077
  - Density: 1,331.2/sq mi (513.97/km^{2})
- Time zone: UTC-5 (Eastern (EST))
  - Summer (DST): UTC-4 (EDT)
- ZIP code: 13461
- Area code: 315
- FIPS code: 36-66993
- GNIS feature ID: 0965089
- Website: City of Sherrill, New York

Sherrill is a city in Oneida County, New York, United States. With a population of 3,077 at the time of the 2020 census, it is the state's least populous city.

The city is at the western end of the Town of Vernon on Route 5. It is referred to as The Silver City.

== History ==
Sherrill was founded in 1916 through a special act of the state legislature and is named in honor of Congressman James S. Sherman's infant son Sherrill Babcock Sherman. It is unique among cities in New York, because its city charter provides that, for many purposes, it is to be treated as if it were still a village located within the town of Vernon. While other cities in New York are not subject to a town's jurisdiction, the Vernon town government continues to have jurisdiction over the territory of the city.

On September 10, 1969, Police Chief Thomas P. Reilly and Patrolman Robert A. Mumford were shot on Route 5 and Sherrill Road when questioning a man about a $500 holdup of a gas station in Canastota, NY. Martin J. Fitzpatrick killed Patrolman Mumford that day and Chief Reilly died 3 days later.

In 1997, the Oneida tribe purchased land within the city, eventually initiating a dispute about whether they had to pay taxes.

== Geography ==
According to the United States Census Bureau, the city has a total area of 2.0 square miles (5.2 km^{2}), all land. Sherrill is located adjacent to the border of Madison County.

New York State Route 5 passes through the north side of the city.

== Demographics ==
Historical population
Census	Pop.	Note	%±
1920	1,761		—
1930	2,150		22.1%
1940	2,184		1.6%
1950	2,236		2.4%
1960	2,922		30.7%
1970	2,986		2.2%
1980	2,830		−5.2%
1990	2,864		1.2%
2000	3,147		9.9%
2010	3,071		−2.4%
2020	3,077		0.2%
U.S. Decennial Census

=== 2020 census ===
As of the 2020 census, Sherrill had a population of 3,077. The median age was 47.6 years. 19.7% of residents were under the age of 18 and 24.8% of residents were 65 years of age or older. For every 100 females there were 95.6 males, and for every 100 females age 18 and over there were 92.7 males age 18 and over.

97.2% of residents lived in urban areas, while 2.8% lived in rural areas.

There were 1,359 households in Sherrill, of which 26.5% had children under the age of 18 living in them. Of all households, 47.8% were married-couple households, 17.7% were households with a male householder and no spouse or partner present, and 27.3% were households with a female householder and no spouse or partner present. About 33.8% of all households were made up of individuals and 18.4% had someone living alone who was 65 years of age or older.

There were 1,409 housing units, of which 3.5% were vacant. The homeowner vacancy rate was 1.3% and the rental vacancy rate was 4.0%.

Racial composition as of the 2020 census
Race	Number	Percent
White	2,857	92.9%
Black or African American	11	0.4%
American Indian and Alaska Native	5	0.2%
Asian	47	1.5%
Native Hawaiian and Other Pacific Islander	0	0.0%
Some other race	7	0.2%
Two or more races	150	4.9%
Hispanic or Latino (of any race)	45	1.5%

=== 2000 census ===
As of the census of 2000, there were 3,147 people, 1,262 households, and 879 families residing in the city. The population density was 1,554.6 inhabitants per square mile (600.2/km^{2}). There were 1,309 housing units at an average density of 646.6 per square mile (249.7/km^{2}). The racial makeup of the city was 98.00% (3,084) White, 0.22% (6) African American, 0.60% (18) Native American, 0.60% (18) Asian, 0.03% from other races, and 0.54% from two or more races. Hispanic or Latino of any race were 0.83% (26) of the population.

There were 1,262 households, out of which 33.6% had children under the age of 18 living with them, 59.3% were married couples living together, 8.1% had a female householder with no husband present, and 30.3% were non-families. 27.4% of all households were made up of individuals, and 15.9% had someone living alone who was 65 years of age or older. The average household size was 2.48 and the average family size was 3.03.

In the city, the population was spread out, with 26.2% under the age of 18, 5.8% from 18 to 24, 25.0% from 25 to 44, 25.9% from 45 to 64, and 17.1% who were 65 years of age or older. The median age was 41 years. For every 100 females, there were 86.8 males. For every 100 females age 18 and over, there were 81.8 males.

The median income for a household in the city was $48,919, and the median income for a family was $60,573. Males had a median income of $41,179 versus $26,500 for females. The per capita income for the city was $22,311. About 0.8% of families and 2.2% of the population were below the poverty line, including 2.6% of those under age 18 and 3.9% of those age 65 or over.

== Education ==
Vernon-Verona-Sherrill Central School District, which covers almost all of Sherrill, operates area schools.

E.A. McAllister Elementary School is in Sherrill. The area secondary schools are Vernon-Verona-Sherrill Middle School and Vernon-Verona-Sherrill High School.

A small portion of Sherrill is in Oneida City School District.

== Notable people ==
- Matt Patricia (born 1974), American football coach, former Detroit Lions head coach
- Philip Markoff (born 1986), alleged murderer, nicknamed the "Craigslist killer."
- Adam Kemp (born 1990), professional basketball player

== Notable objects ==
- Flatware. See Sherrill Manufacturing
