= Vernon (village), New York =

Vernon, New York Oneida: Ska-nu-sunk
- Village
- Location in Oneida County and the state of New York.
- Coordinates: 43°4′47″N 75°32′25″W
- Country: United States
- State: New York
- County: Oneida

Area
  - Total: 0.95 sq mi (2.46 km^{2})
  - Land: 0.95 sq mi (2.45 km^{2})
  - Water: 0.0039 sq mi (0.01 km^{2})
- Elevation: 633 ft (193 m)

Population (2020)
  - Total: 1,177
  - Density: 1,244.3/sq mi (480.44/km^{2})
- Time zone: UTC-5 (Eastern (EST))
  - Summer (DST): UTC-4 (EDT)
- ZIP code: 13476
- Area code: 315
- FIPS code: 36-77112
- GNIS feature ID: 0968495

Vernon (Oneida: Ska-nu-sunk, lit. 'place of the fox') is a village in Oneida County, New York, United States. The population was 1,177 at the 2020 census.

The village of Vernon is located east of the center of the town of Vernon, at the junction of routes 5 and 31.

== History ==
Vernon was incorporated on April 6, 1827.

The Vernon Center Green Historic District was listed on the National Register of Historic Places in 1985. The Vernon Methodist Church was listed in 1998.

== Geography ==
Vernon is located at 43°4′46″N 75°32′24″W (43.079601, -75.540204), on Skanandoa Creek ("hemlock", or "stream of hemlocks"). Skanandoa Creek was named after the famous Skenandoa.

According to the United States Census Bureau, the village has a total area of 0.9 square mile (2.4 km^{2}), all land.

== Demographics ==
Historical population
Census	Pop.	Note	%±
1870	391		—
1880	345		−11.8%
1890	377		9.3%
1900	380		0.8%
1910	451		18.7%
1920	541		20.0%
1930	602		11.3%
1940	587		−2.5%
1950	754		28.4%
1960	913		21.1%
1970	1,108		21.4%
1980	1,373		23.9%
1990	1,274		−7.2%
2000	1,155		−9.3%
2010	1,172		1.5%
2020	1,177		0.4%
U.S. Decennial Census

As of the census of 2000, there were 1,155 people, 499 households, and 314 families residing in the village. The population density was 1,264.5 inhabitants per square mile (488.2/km^{2}). There were 544 housing units at an average density of 595.6 per square mile (230.0/km^{2}). The racial makeup of the village was 97.92% White, 1.13% Black or African American, 0.17% Native American, 0.09% Asian, 0.35% from other races, and 0.35% from two or more races. Hispanic or Latino of any race were 1.04% of the population.

There were 499 households, out of which 32.1% had children under the age of 18 living with them, 44.9% were married couples living together, 12.4% had a female householder with no husband present, and 36.9% were non-families. 31.7% of all households were made up of individuals, and 9.6% had someone living alone who was 65 years of age or older. The average household size was 2.29 and the average family size was 2.85.

In the village, the population was spread out, with 24.3% under the age of 18, 8.6% from 18 to 24, 30.9% from 25 to 44, 23.2% from 45 to 64, and 13.0% who were 65 years of age or older. The median age was 37 years. For every 100 females, there were 99.8 males. For every 100 females age 18 and over, there were 91.2 males.

The median income for a household in the village was $34,600, and the median income for a family was $41,375. Males had a median income of $33,984 versus $23,804 for females. The per capita income for the village was $17,930. About 7.4% of families and 9.7% of the population were below the poverty line, including 10.2% of those under age 18 and 5.5% of those age 65 or over.
