= Fude =

Fude can refer to

- Tudigong
- Ofuda
- Ink brush, the Japanese name of the brush used in Japanese calligraphy
