= Gertrude Bass Warner =

American art collector (1863–1951)

Gertrude Bass Warner (May 14, 1863 – July 29, 1951) was an American 20th-century art collector, with particular interests in Asian art, religious artifacts, daily-life textiles, ceramics, paintings, and photographs.

== Biography ==
She lived, traveled, and collected art in East Asia from 1904 to 1938. In 1922 she became the curator for life and first director of the University of Oregon Museum of Art (today, the Jordan Schnitzer Museum of Art) at the University of Oregon, helping to design the historic building with famed architect Ellis F. Lawrence. She had the museum built to house the collection of more than 3,700 works of art, the Murray Warner Collection of Oriental Art, named after her late husband, Murray Warner. She donated the collection to the university in 1933. She traveled throughout China, Japan, Korea, and Russia purchasing works of art and artifacts, taking photographs, and writing extensive field notes. She visited thousands of cultural sites and studied Shinto, Buddhism, and Chinese and Japanese etiquette, and the human experience, and became an innovator in the promotion of Asian art and culture appreciation, Asian studies, and multiculturalism. She is considered a female pioneer of museum studies.

Today, Warner's legacy includes the material collection at the JSMA, the Murray Warner Collection of Asian Art, which includes 3,700 objects, and the Gertrude Bass Warner Collection: hundreds of papers, letters, journals, manuscripts (including the unpublished "When West Meets East"), and thousands of photographs, rare nōsatsu or senjafuda (votives slips), and hand-tinted lantern slides comprising the Gertrude Bass Warner Collection, managed by University of Oregon Special Collections & University Archives (SCUA) in cooperation with Oregon Digital and the JSMA.

== Early life ==
Gertrude Bass Warner was born May 14, 1863, in Chicago. She was the daughter of Clara Foster and Perkins Bass (U.S. District Attorney under Abraham Lincoln). Foster had inherited wealth from his grandfather John Foster.and purchased real estate early in the development of Chicago; Warner would eventually benefit from the family's wealth. The Fosters lived in Peterborough, NH. Warner's mother advocated for women's education and even sponsored the construction of the first women's dormitory on the University of Chicago campus (1892). Warner attended school in Philadelphia, a boarding school in Paris where her family had an apartment, and, then Vassar College in New York, where she studied art and photography. She finished her studies at the University of Chicago, where she met her first husband, George F. Fiske. They married in 1888, and moved to Chicago to start a family. She had two boys, Samuel Perkins Fiske (b. 1889) and George Foster Fiske Jr. (b. 1890), and daughter, Clara (b. 1893), who died before her first year. Two years later, they divorced, each taking custody of one of the boys, Sam staying with Gertrude. Following the 1895 divorce, she and Sam went to live on the wealthy family estate in Peterborough, NH. A brother, John Foster Bass, was a noted journalist, war correspondent, and author, first, for the New York Journal and later throughout Eurasia for the Chicago Daily News, the Chicago Record, and Harper's Weekly. During his time working for Harpers, Warner journeyed to Asia for the first time in 1904, living with John in the foreign enclave quarter of Shanghai while he covered the Boxer Rebellion in China.

Robert P. Bass, (September 1, 1873 – July 29, 1960), 53rd governor of New Hampshire from 1911 to 1913, was another brother of Gertrude Bass Warner.

== Marriage and early career ==
Gertrude Bass Warner met Major Murray Warner (1869–1920) through her brother John. Murray, an engineer and quartermaster major in the U.S. military, had studied engineering at Massachusetts Institute of Technology, in the 1890, and served in the Spanish–American War (1898) as a U.S. Army lieutenant. He moved to China in 1900 to establish the engineering department of the American Trading Company and was positioned as an American Company of Volunteers for Shanghai to protect U.S. citizens living abroad during the Boxer Rebellion. Gertrude and Murray married on October 1, 1905, and resided in Shanghai for the next four years. Her son, Sam, would eventually legally adopt Warner's last name and spend much time traveling with his parents. They bought a houseboat, the Illinois, and Warner describes in her diary traveling along Chinese waterways. At this time (1904–1909) Warner began taking photographs for future use as lantern slides. Numerous images of crowded Chinese streets and sacred sites fill her later slide collection. The Warners continued to live in Shanghai intermittently, spending more and more time in the U.S. at their new home, the Fairmont San Francisco, CA, but also traveling to parts of Japan. By 1916, Warner had begun to travel in Japan, where she developed a love of Shinto. The lantern-slide collection also includes hundreds of Japanese sacred sites, cityscapes, and daily life activities, and the Warners captured numerous photographs of Meiji and Shōwa period. During her travels throughout Japan, Warner began documenting the manny shrines she visited. She maintained a diary from 1913 to the 1920, with field notes giving valuable descriptions of Shinto shrines (jinja), particular rituals, and site histories. Murray died of a heart attack in San Francisco; on October 4, 1920, at the age of 51. Shortly after, Warner moved to Eugene, Oregon, to live near her son, Sam Bass Warner, who had accepted a teaching position in Criminal Law at the University of Oregon.

== The Murray Warner Collection ==
Warner established what would become the East Asian Studies department at the University of Oregon. She took five collecting trips to Asia from the 1920s to 1940s, at times accompanied by her friend UO art historian and collector Maude Kerns or others, . She visited and collected art in China, Japan, Korea, Cambodia, and Russia. She met with other collectors, such as Frederick Starr, and regional specialists, including Asian professors of art and religious history. She purchased turn-of-the-century lantern slides, including Starr's photographs from trips to Korea. Warner befriended artist Elizabeth Keith in the late 1930s, and acquired and display numerous of her works, along with other artists (Helen Hyde, Maude Kerns, Charles W. Bartlett).

== University of Oregon Museum of Art ==
Following Murray's death, she moved to Eugene, Oregon, to live near her son Sam, and began finding a permanent home for her collection. In 1922, Warner donated the first of many objects to the University of Oregon. At the time the university lacked a museum, and the collection was housed in the Woman's Memorial Hall (now Gerlinger Hall). With funding and support from Irene Hazard Gerlinger, the university's first woman regent, a permanent professional museum was built to house the collection. Work began in 1925, headed by architect and professor Ellis F. Lawrence. Called "one of Lawrence's finest buildings [for its] exotic blend of Modernistic, oriental and European styles", the University of Oregon Museum of Art realized Warner's transnational learning philosophy. Warner and Lawrence envisioned it as a physical representation of "the meeting of eastern and western civilizations on the Pacific Coast." The building was renamed the Jordan Schnitzer Museum of Art in 2005.

== Later years ==
In the 1930s, she composed an unpublished manuscript "When West Meets East," y. Before World War II, she stopped visiting and collecting art in Asia, and in 1944, moved to live near Sam, once again, in Peterborough, NH. Warner died at the age of 88 from a heart attack on July 29, 1951, at the family home in Hillsborough, NH. Her death certificate lists her "usual occupation" as "housewife." She was buried in the Pine Hill Cemetery with her tombstone noting simply "Wife of Murray Warner."

== Legacy ==
Warner was awarded an honorary degree of Master of Arts in public service from the University of Oregon in 1929, "in recognition of her scholarly contribution to a better understanding of the art and civilization of Oriental peoples through her discriminating selection and organization of material contained in the Murray Warner Collection, and her tireless efforts in the promotion of international goodwill."

Warner supported internationalism and transcultural study, sponsoring some of Oregon's first international organizations and societies for the propagation of art history and museum research. She created a scholarship and funding source for research on Asian art and history, and founded the Murray Warner Essay writing contest, sponsoring UO students to study abroad and Japanese students to come study at the UO. She also funded the UO's first International Club and encouraged faculty to use the material wealth of the museum for educational purposes.

She was a delegate to 1929 Institute of Pacific Relations in Japan and sponsored the development of museums in Shanghai, at missionary schools such as St. Mary's Hall and the International Institute.

In 1958, in a dedication ceremony for the Gertrude Bass Memorial Reference Library for the UO Museum of Art, her friend Maude Kerns explained how she hoped the University of Oregon would continue Warner's mission "to build a bridge of love and understanding between East and West, so desperately needed in solving today's problems."

The JSMA honors her with the Gertrude Bass Warner Award, recently awarded to former UO student and, later, professor of literature Yoko Matsuoka McClain (1924-2011). The Murray Warner Collection of Asian Art is available to the public at the Jordan Schnitzer Museum of Art. Her collection of papers, manuscripts, senjafuda (votive slips) numbering in the tens-of-thousands, lantern slides (5,000+), and early UO museum papers, photographs, and Asian art library collection are all housed at the Knight Library University of Oregon Special Collections & University Archives as the Gertrude Bass Warner Collection. Many of the above are viewable online through the Oregon Digital website.

== Bibliography ==
- Yoshihara, Mari (2003). Embracing the East: White Women and American Orientalism. Oxford University Press.
- Ressler, Susan R., editor (2003). Women Artists of the American West. McFarland & Company, Inc. ISBN 078641054X
- Roth, Mitchel (1997). Historical Dictionary of War Journalism. Greenwood.
- Jensen, Joan M. (2003). "Women on the Pacific Rim: Cultural Border Crossing" in Women Artists of the American West, Susan R. Ressler (ed.) . McFarland & Company, Inc. ISBN 078641054X
- Wright, Amanda S. (2002). "'A Little Knowledge is a Dangerous Thing': Gertrude Bass Warner, General Norman Munthe, and the Enigma of the UOMA Buddha," University of Oregon Department of Art History and Graduate School Master of Arts Thesis.
- Rosenow, Cecilia L. (2002). "Pictures of the Floating World: American Modernist Poetry and Cultural Translations of Japan," University of Oregon Department of English and the Graduate School Doctoral Dissertation.
- "History". Jordan Schnitzer Museum of Art, University of Oregon. https://jsma.uoregon.edu/history.
- Teague, Edward H. (2012). "Architecture of the University of Oregon: Jordan Schnitzer Museum of Art". UO Libraries, University of Oregon. https://library.uoregon.edu/architecture/oregon/museumart.html.
- Helmer, Normand (2010). "Gertrude Bass Warner lantern slides, 1904-1930" Finding Aid. Archives West, Orbis Cascade Alliance, referenced 04/28/2017, http://archiveswest.orbiscascade.org/ark:/80444/xv81365.
- Helmer, Normand (2012). "Gertrude Bass Warner lantern slides, 1903-1929". University of Oregon Special Collections & University Archives, UO Libraries, https://library.uoregon.edu/speccoll/photo/warner/fWarner.html.
- Helmer, Normand (2012). "Gertrude Bass Warner". Normand Helmer, University of Oregon Special Collections & University Archives, UO Libraries, https://library.uoregon.edu/speccoll/photo/warner/index.html.
- Helmer, Normand (2012). "Our escape from Peking with our treasures for the University of Oregon Museum". University of Oregon Special Collections & University Archives (SCUA), UO Libraries, https://library.uoregon.edu/speccoll/photo/warner/escape.html.
- "The Gertrude Bass Warner Collection of Japanese Votive Slips (nōsatsu), 1850s to 1930s". Oregon Digital (2016), UO Libraries, https://oregondigital.org/sets/gb-warner-nosatsu.
- Gosselink Orr, Ellie (2015). "Remarkable Gertrude!" UO Libraries Special Collections & University Archive, Personal Copy
- "Museum of Art," Ellis Lawrence Building Survey. v.2 (Eugene). Compiled by the Historic Preservation Program, School of Architecture and Allied Arts, University of Oregon; project directors, Michael Shellenbarger, Kimberly Lakin. Salem, Or.: State Historic Preservation Office. 1989.
