= Frederick Starr =

American anthropologist and curator (1858–1933)

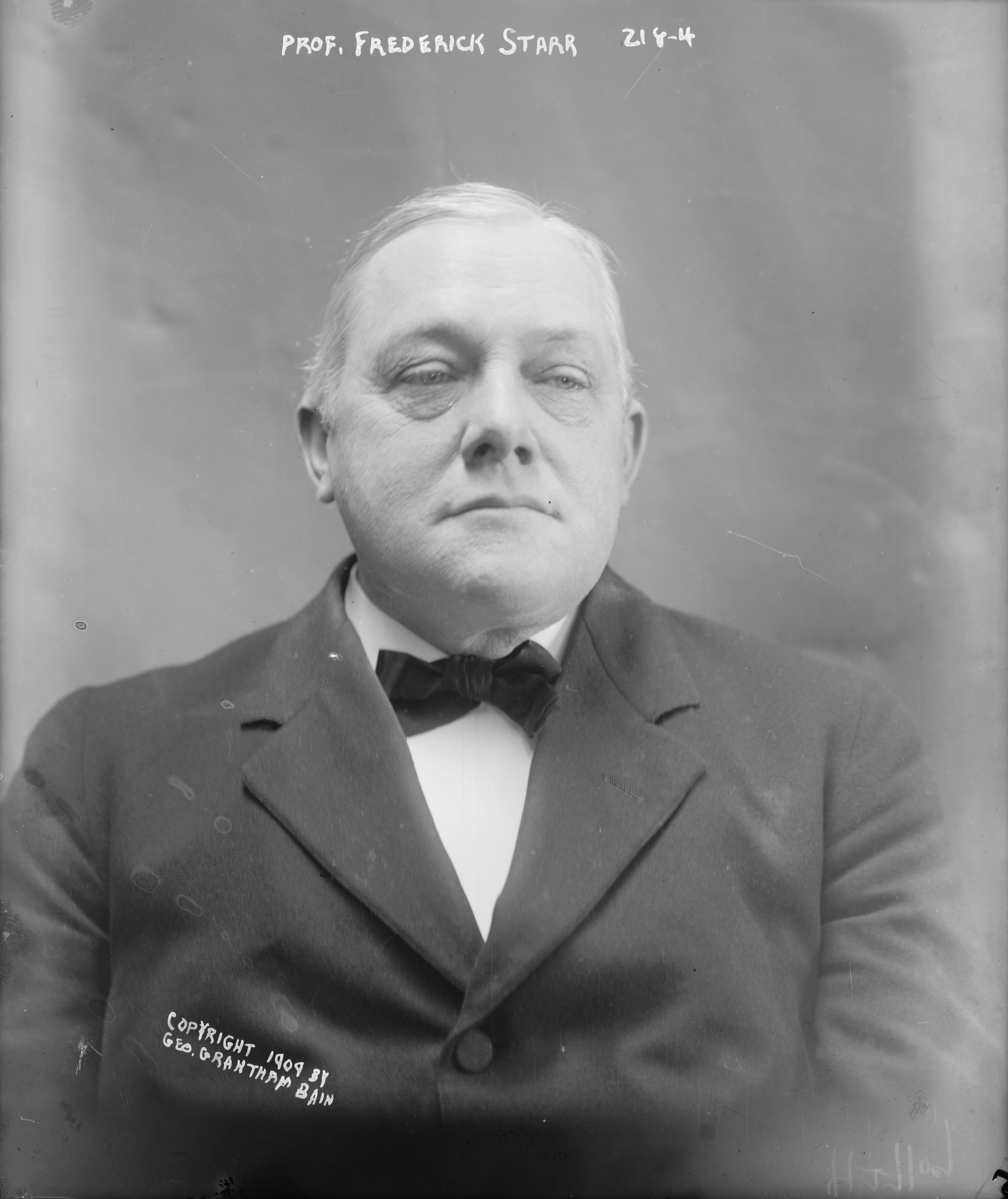
Frederick Starr in 1909.

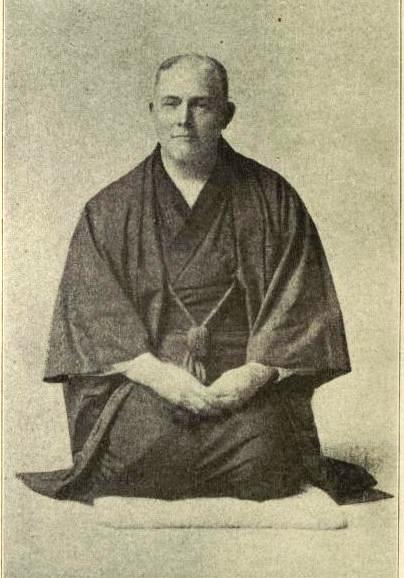
Starr wearing Japanese clothes

Frederick Starr (September 2, 1858 – August 14, 1933) was an American anthropologist and "populist educator" born in Auburn, New York. He was the fourth son of a Missouri clergyman and abolitionist Frederick Starr.

As he was avid collector of charms (ofuda) and votive slips (senjafuda or nōsatsu) he was called Dr. Ofuda (お札博士, Ofuda Hakushi/ Hakase) in Japan. He sold much of this collection to art collector and museum specialist Gertrude Bass Warner, and it currently resides at the Jordan Schnitzer Museum of Art at the University of Oregon and the University of Oregon Knight Library Special Collections & University Archives.

== Biography ==
Starr earned an undergraduate degree at the University of Rochester (1882) and a doctorate in geology at Lafayette College (1885). While working as a curator of geology at the American Museum of Natural History (AMNH) in New York, he became interested in anthropology and ethnology. Frederic Ward Putnam helped him become appointed as curator of AMNH's ethological collection (1889–1891).

In this period, he became active in the Chautauqua circuit as a popular professor and, in 1888–89, as registrar. When William Rainey Harper, president of the Chautauqua Institution, was named President of the University of Chicago, he appointed Starr as an assistant professor of anthropology there.

Starr moved to the University of Chicago in 1891; he served in its faculty for the next 31 years. He was an Assistant professor (1892–1895), and he gained tenure in 1896. He also served as the Curator of the anthropological section of the University's Walker Museum.

One of Starr's most infamous incidents occurred while traveling in Mexico. Much like ethnologist Carl Sofus Lumholtz, Starr traveled to the Purépecha community of Cheran, Michoacan located in the Meseta Purépecha in the state of Michoacan. Unlike his predecessor, Starr successfully obtained Amerindian bones, said to have been dug up from a nearby ancient burial. He intended to take these with him to the U.S. for the collection of the University of Chicago. The inhabitants of Cheran opposed having their ancestors exhumed and were suspicious of Starr's motives for visiting Cheran.

In 1905-06 Starr made a study of the pygmy races of Central Africa. In 1908 he did field work in the Philippine Islands, followed by Japan in 1909–10, and Korea in 1911.

In his Truth about the Congo Free State (1907), a collection of articles regarding the Congo Free State, Starr wrote:

Many a time... I have seen a man immediately after being flogged, laughing and playing with his companions as if naught had happened. Personally, though I have seen many cases of this form of punishment, I have never seen blood drawn, nor the fainting of the victim."

In this period there was mounting criticism of the state of near-slavery in which rubber workers were kept by colonial forces. Starr's work is often cited as an example of the whitewashing campaign King Leopold II conducted from 1884 to 1912, also known as the Congo Free State Propaganda War. Floggings with the chicotte were known and documented as an especially cruel form of torture by other observers, such as Roger Casement, an Anglo-Irish investigator. He extensively reported on the abuse of the indigenous peoples by the private Belgian police which the king used to impose a state of virtual slavery for rubber workers.

Starr happened to be in Japan when the 1923 Great Kantō earthquake and subsequent major fires struck the main island of Honshū. In the absence of news from the devastated area, speculation about his safety was published in the New York Times. His plans to spend several months researching the vicinity of Mount Fuji were not specific, nor was the extent of the quake area known. Reports that the area near Mount Fuji were hard hit led to increased concerns. The US Embassy in Tokyo published Dr. Starr's name among the list of survivors. Dr. Starr had escaped to the relative safety of Zojo-ji, a famous Buddhist Temple in Tokyo's Shiba district in what is today Minato ward. A brief description from a letter he wrote to friends in Auburn, New York, was printed in the New York Times:

We went to the temple grounds, but at midnight, the priests took us up higher and higher to the innermost temple. Here on the topmost step, I sat till morning, watching the brazen sky beyond the slope meaning ruin to millions."

Dr. Starr died of bronchial pneumonia at age 74 in Tokyo, August 14, 1933. Services were held at Trinity Cathedral in Tokyo. Among those attending was Japanese Premier Makoto Saito. He was survived by his sister, Lucy Starr, who helped execute his estate.

== Honors ==
- Order of Leopold (Belgium)
- Order of the Crown of Italy (Italy)
- Order of the Sacred Treasure (Japan)
- University of Chicago, Department of Anthropology, Starr Lectureship

== Selected works ==
- Catalogue of Collections of Objects Illustrating Mexican Folklore (1899)
- Indians of South Mexico (1900)
- The Ainu Group of the Saint Louis Exposition (1904)
- The Truth about the Congo (1907)
- In Indian Mexico (1908)
- Filipino Riddles (1909)
- Japanese Proverbs and Pictures (1910)
- Liberia: Description, History, Problems (1914)
- Mexico and the United States (1914)
- Japanese Collectors and What They Collect (1921)
- Fujiyama, the Sacred Mountain of Japan (1924)
