= Jordan Schnitzer Museum of Art =

- University of Oregon Museum of Art
- U.S. National Register of Historic Places
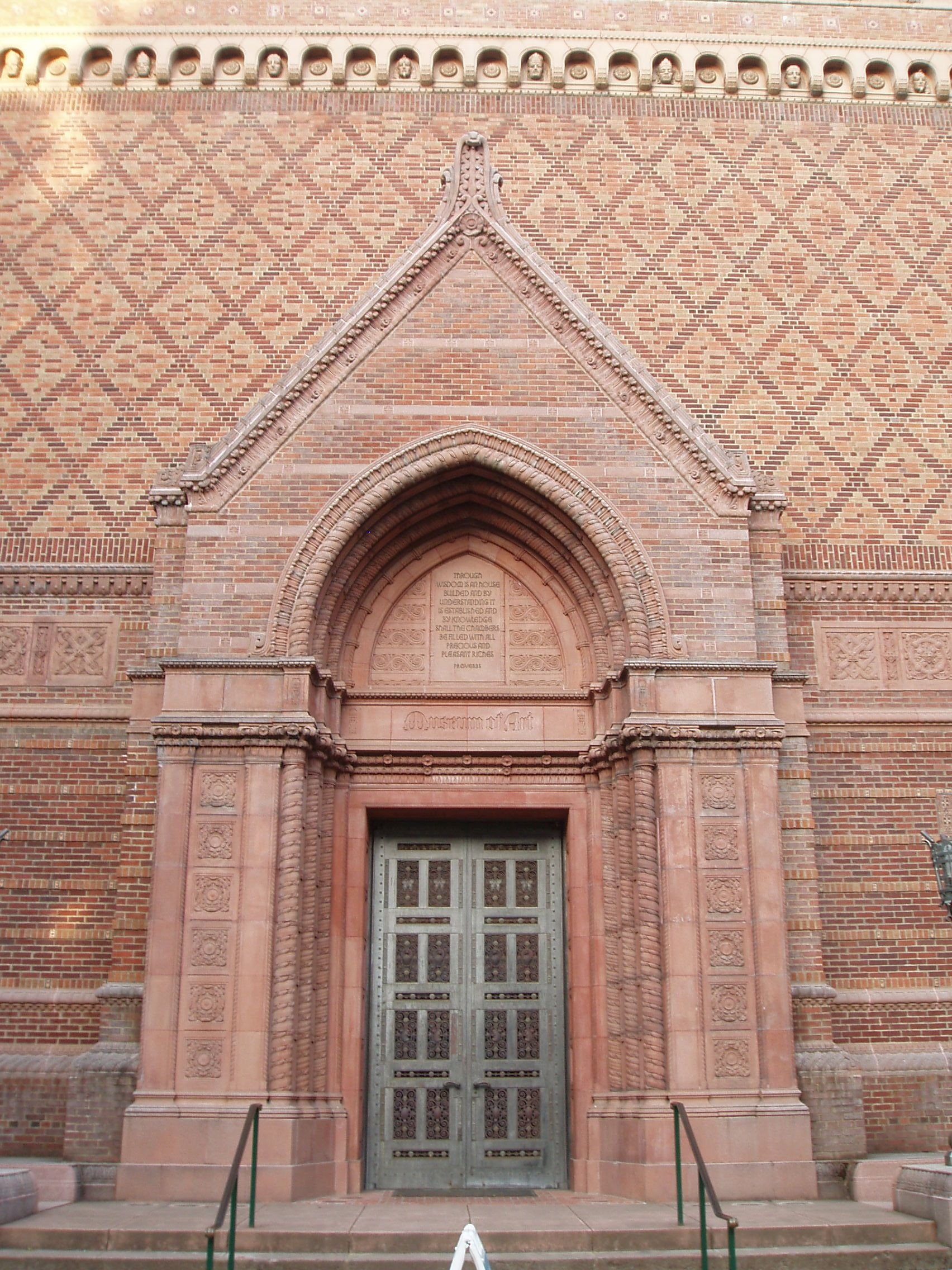
- JSMA main entrance

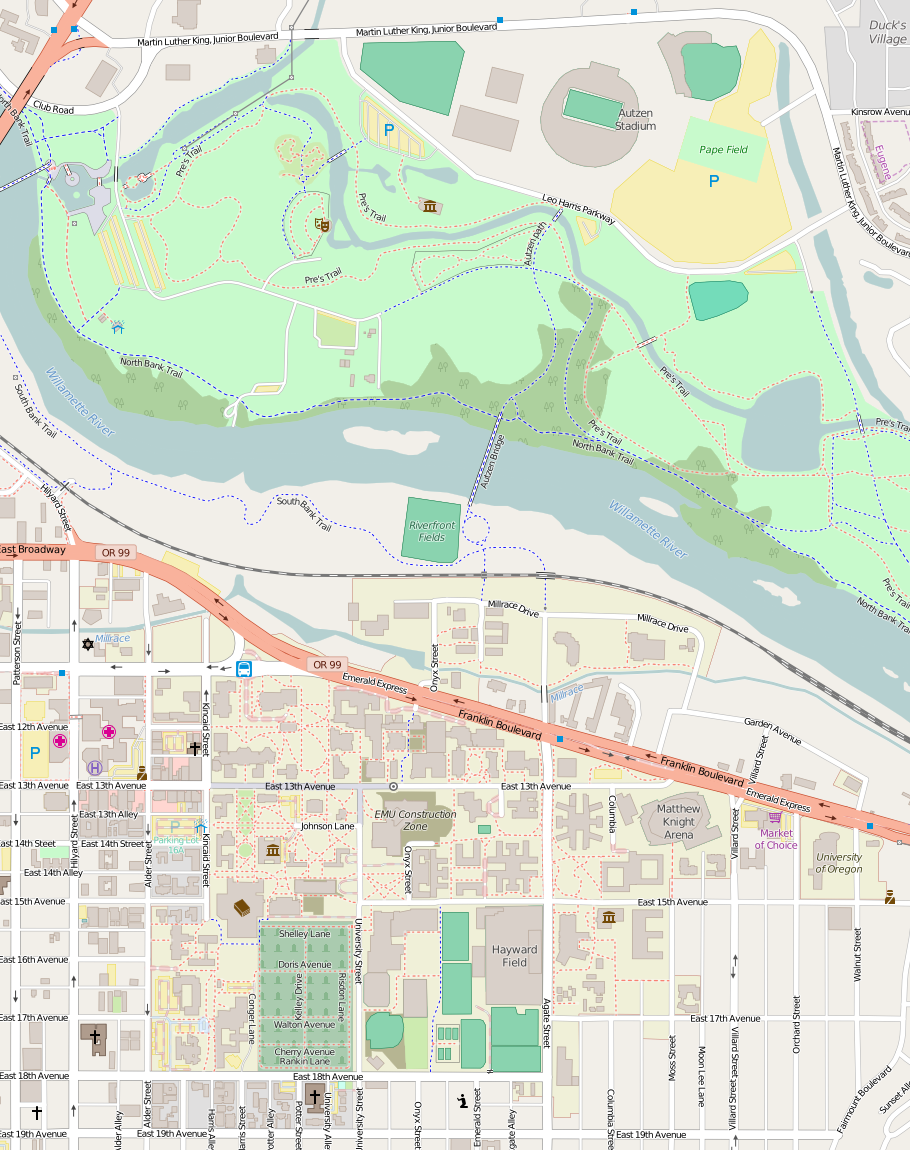
- Location within University of Oregon Campus
- Location: 1430 Johnson Lane, Eugene, Oregon
- Coordinates: 44°2′39″N 123°4′38″W
- Built: 1930
- Architect: Ellis F. Lawrence
- NRHP reference No.: 86001224
- Added to NRHP: June 5, 1986

see also the Jordan Schnitzer Museum of Art, Washington State University, Pullman, Washington

Jordan Schnitzer Museum of Art (JSMA) is an art museum located on the campus of the University of Oregon in Eugene, Oregon. The original building was designed by Ellis F. Lawrence as part of his "main university quadrangle," now known as the Memorial Quadrangle. Its first Director, Asian art collector, and female museum specialist Gertrude Bass Warner, also influenced the building's design, particularly its innovative climate control measures. The museum is accredited by the American Alliance of Museums. It is named for Jordan Schnitzer.

== History ==
The University of Oregon Museum of Art opened its doors to the public in 1933. Designed by Ellis F. Lawrence, UO dean of Architecture & Allied Arts at the time, the museum was built to house the Murray Warner Collection of Oriental Art—more than 3,700 works of art given to the university by Gertrude Bass Warner. Warner had pushed for arts education based on material culture since moving to Eugene in 1920s, and the collection's first home had been Gerlinger Hall, the Woman's Memorial Hall attributed to first female regent and art enthusiast Irene Hazard Gerlinger, where it resided until 1933. As the museum's first director and "curator for life," Warner sought to bridge cultural divides through art and culture education, as seen in the inaugural set of conditions for the Murray Warner Collection of Oriental Art: "It is my wish, hope and prayer that the officers in charge of this collection, the President of the University, and the professors of the University keep in mind the object of this gift, and keep presenting to the students and the public the ideas of fellowship, friendship and love toward our neighbors across the Pacific—that peace may always be maintained in order that this collection may be a blessing and that love may reign at home and abroad. (Oregana, 1934, pp. 165-167)"

A major museum expansion took place from 2002 to 2005, at which time the museum was given its current name in honor of Jordan D. Schnitzer, the major donor for the expansion work.

== Branches ==
Two other universities, Portland State University and Washington State University, also have a Jordan Schnitzer Museum of Art. All three entities are operated by their respective university.

== Mission and activities ==
The Jordan Schnitzer Museum of Art enhances the University of Oregon's academic mission and furthers the appreciation and enjoyment of the visual arts for the general public. It aims to provide an atmosphere of discovery – the JSMA mission statement includes this guiding principle: "We recognize our visitors' different learning styles and the needs of a multigenerational and diverse audience".

The only academic art museum in Oregon accredited by the American Alliance of Museums, the JSMA hosts exhibitions and houses collections of historic and contemporary art. It manages research and educational programs and publishes resources in support the university's academic mission, including outreach initiatives to serve the diverse interests of off-campus communities.

== Exhibits ==
The JSMA's standing galleries present from its holdings of Chinese, Japanese, Korean, and American art, as well as an extensive collection of contemporary Cuban art, including the original vintage photographs from the personal collection of Cuban photographer Alberto Korda.

Special exhibition galleries display curated artwork both from these permanent collections and outside collections, representing cultures across the globe, past and present. A new exhibit is planned for the museum featuring work addressing the Black Lives Matter movement.

== Inscriptions ==
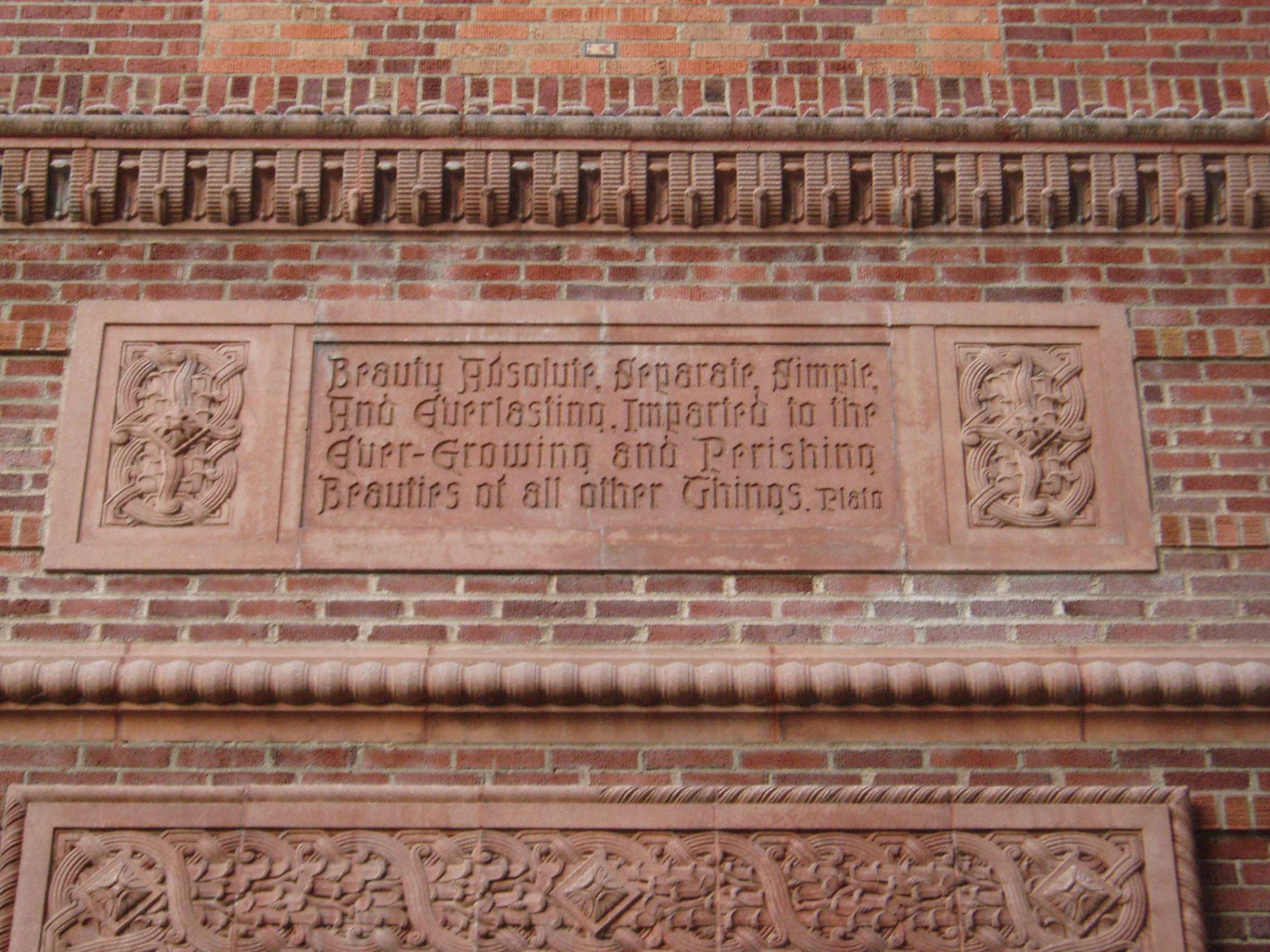
Detail of the passage by Plato inscribed on the west facade.

The buildings contains three prominent quotations on its main, west-facing facade. Above the door, there is a quotation from Proverbs, near the south end of the facade there is a passage from Plato, and on the north part a quotation from Lao Tzu.

In addition, the cornerstone contains a passage from Psalms.

== See also ==
- Anne Rose Kitagawa
- National Register of Historic Places listings in Lane County, Oregon
- Gertrude Bass Warner
- Encounter (sculpture)—sculpture located and dedicated adjacent to the museum
