= Senjafuda =

Handwritten or woodblock-printed stickers pasted to shrines or temples in Japan

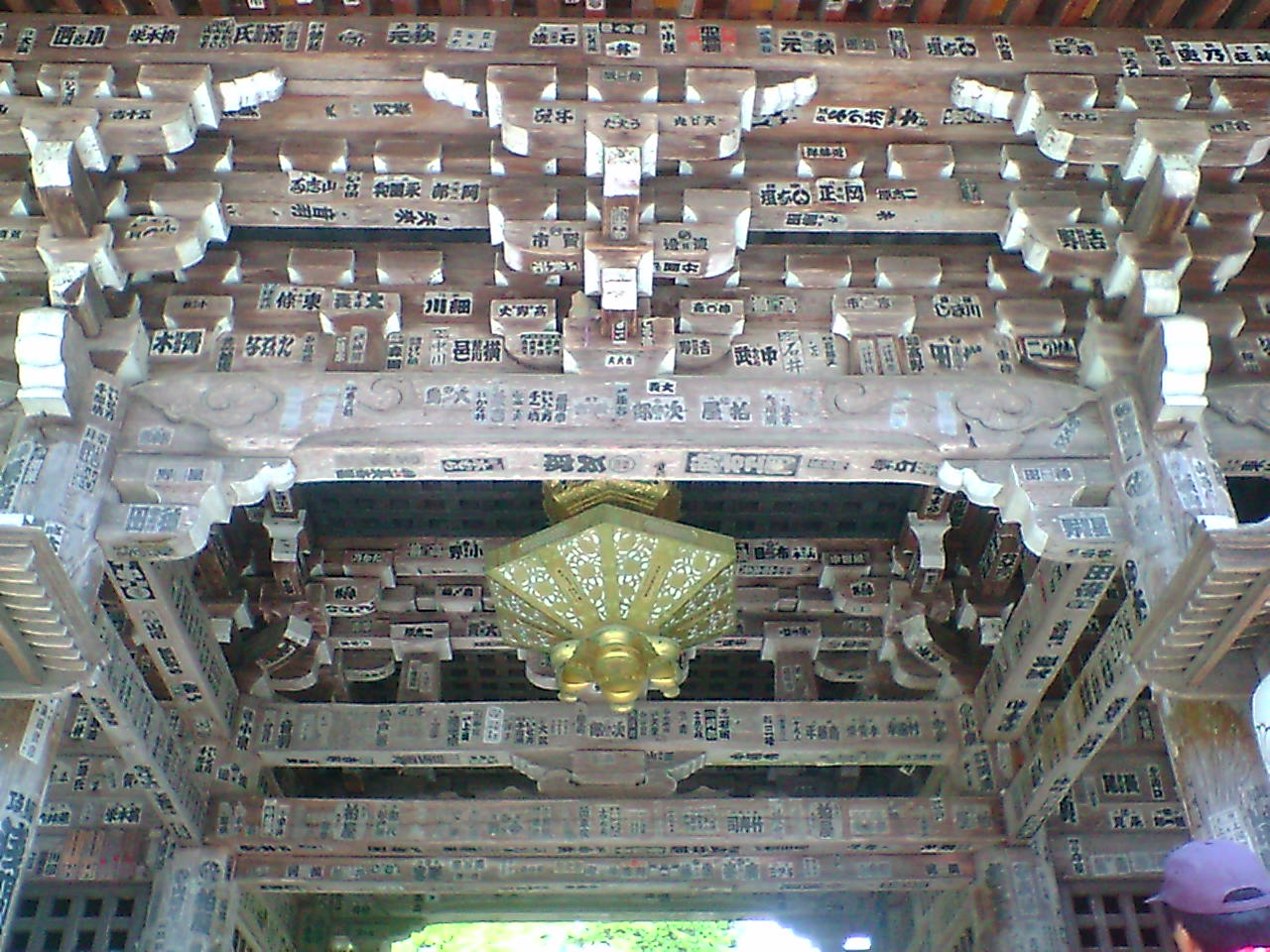
Senjafuda pasted on a shrine gate in Gifu

Senjafuda (千社札, lit. 'thousand-shrine tags') are votive slips, stickers or placards posted on the gates or buildings of Shinto shrines and Buddhist temples in Japan. Unlike ofuda, which bear the name of the shrine, senjafuda bear the name of the worshipper, and can be purchased pre-printed with common names at temples and shrines throughout Japan, as well as at stationery stores and video game centres. Senjafuda were originally made from wooden slats, but have been made of paper since the Edo period.

A single senjafuda measures 1.6 sun (58 mm (2.3 in)) in width and 4.8 sun (173 mm (6.8 in)) in height. This gives the senjafuda a ratio of 1:3. A frame is drawn inside this space which contains the lettering or pictures. In 1887, a measurement for this frame was also established as 48 mm (1.9 in) wide and 144 mm (5.7 in) tall.

Ordinarily, the designs were used to commemorate a visit to a temple or shrine and printed with simple monochromatic schemes, but eventually aesthetic sense gave way to colorful variations and designs. In the pleasure quarters of Kyoto, colorful designs were employed on senjafuda and used in place of traditional business cards. This variation is called hana-meishi which roughly translated to "flower business card." Today, the "business card" use of senjafuda is the most common.

Senjafuda were primarily printed with Edomoji, or Edo-period lettering styles, and pressed with the same traditional wooden boards used to produce ukiyo-e prints. Stickers on shrines are often pasted in very obvious, easily seen locations, but a variation on this practice is to purposely obscure the location of the senjafuda in order to protect it from exposure to wind and rain and thus prolong its presence.

== History ==
Senjafuda were first produced in the Heian period (794–1185) when shrine worshipers made pilgrimages to visits to many shrines and worship the Buddhist goddess of mercy, Kannon. They were not originally made of paper, they were first made from wooden slats that were hung from the gates of Kannon temples by nails made of bamboo. The slats were carved out with the visitors' name, area of origin and often included a prayer for a good life and afterlife.

There are two styles of senjafuda: the older style, daimei nosatsu, and the newer style, kokan nosatsu. Daimei nosatsu are basic black ink on white paper. The ink used is so strong that after the printed senjafuda are placed on the shrine or temple gate, years later when the paper is peeled away, the ink remains. Therefore, many shrine kannushi or shinshoku do not like the use of senjafuda, as well as more modern practices, where younger senjafuda practitioners do not pray or buy a stamp from the shrine before applying their senjafuda.

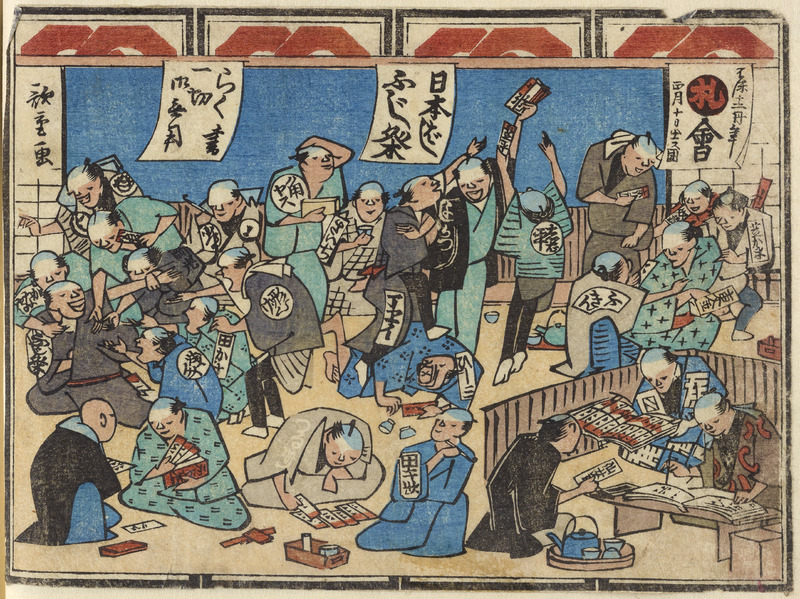
Hiroshige senjafuda depicting an exchange meeting in 1842. One of the hanging banners ironically states "Graffiti strictly forbidden".

The later style of senjafuda are called kokan nosatsu and originated in the Edo period (1603–1868). During the beginning of the Edo period, shrine pilgrimages gained popularity, beginning the tradition known as senjamairi, meaning "a thousand shrine visits for good luck". Kokan nosatsu senjafuda are a lot more colorful than saimei nosatsu, and have rich patterns and designs, being used more as novelty items and more like trading cards or the business cards of today. Like many things during the Edo period, kokan nosatsu senjafuda were regulated, with the number of colours on a person's senjafuda limited to their class and place in society.

Because of this, collectors who enjoyed the many designs and colors of senjafuda began meeting to exchange them with one another; first, the meetings took place at private homes, and then later were arranged for public places like restaurants and expensive tea houses. According to Kiritani's Vanishing Japan, the oldest surviving invitation card to a senjafuda meeting dates back to 1799. Due to the growing popularity of senjafuda meetings, the Japanese government enforced a law forbidding their trading, which did not stop the meetings from taking place. Senjafuda meetings continue to this day, with collectors and aficionados alike meeting to share and trade their own designs as well as admire others.

US collector and Japanese anthropologist Frederick Starr was a turn-of-the-century collector and avid participant in senjafuda or nōsatsu-kai (votive slip exchange clubs), so much so that he was given the name "Dr. Ofuda". He collected tens of thousands of slips, and a fellow collector and popular art enthusiast, Gertrude Bass Warner, purchased much of his collection. It currently resides at the University of Oregon Knight Library Special Collections & University Archives, part of the Gertrude Bass Warner Collection, and examples are viewable online at UO Oregon Digital.

== Construction ==
Senjafuda used to be made from washi paper with ink called sumi, and were pasted on with a starchy rice paste. The pilgrims used to carry walking staffs for their long journeys, which doubled as an applicator for senjafuda. The paste was applied with something called meotobake – two brushes about 30 degrees apart, with a clip on the other side of the brushes, allowing senjafuda to be pasted in out of reach areas, leaving others to wonder exactly how they got up there.

In the present day, senjafuda are made from printed paper, and are rarely made traditionally through wood block printing. Wooden slat senjafuda, however, are still produced, and are worn as a necklace or used for key chain and cell phone ornaments. The ones made from paper are pre-printed with common names; machines are also available that can produce custom senjafuda with adhesive backings.

== Famous figures ==
Some famous producers of senjafuda are Hiroshige, Eisen, Kunisada, Kuniyoshi. They mainly produced senjafuda, due to how expensive the ukiyo-e printing process is.

Senrei Sekioka was one of the foremost Japanese experts of senjafuda history; Iseman and Frederick Starr were also important members of the nosatsu-kai during the Meiji and Taishō eras.

== Modern-day senjafuda ==
Senjafuda are also sold as stickers which do not require separate paste. As stickers, they are also placed in books and on personal items for identification and decoration. A common criticism of the sticker version of senjafuda is that they are more difficult to peel off than their original pasted ancestors, and thus can disfigure the underlying buildings when removed.

== Gallery ==
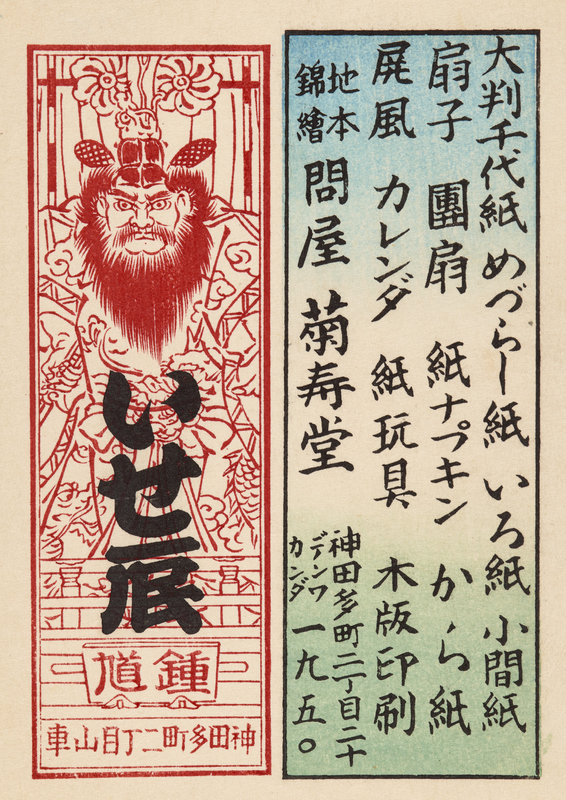
Nōsatsu, Shōki the Demon Queller

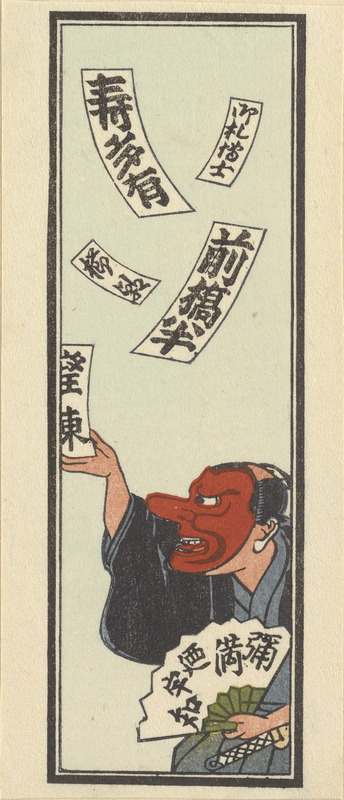
Masked senjafuda collector tossing slips into the air

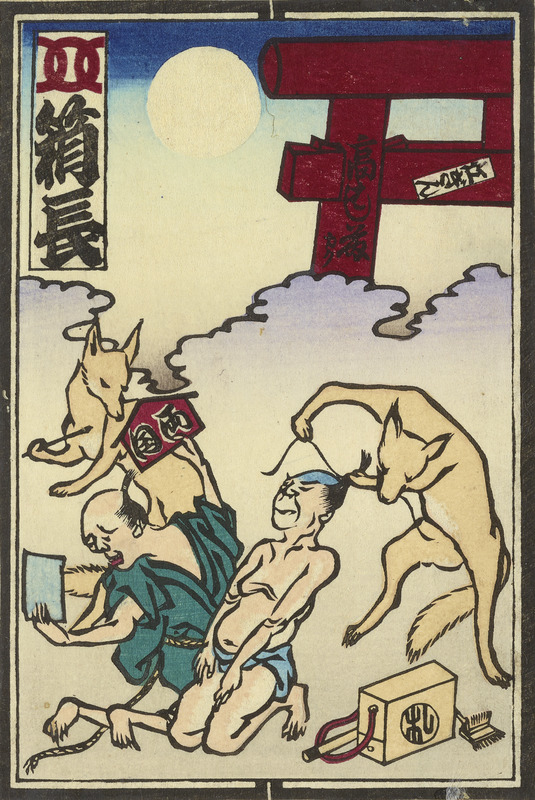
Fox hairdressers

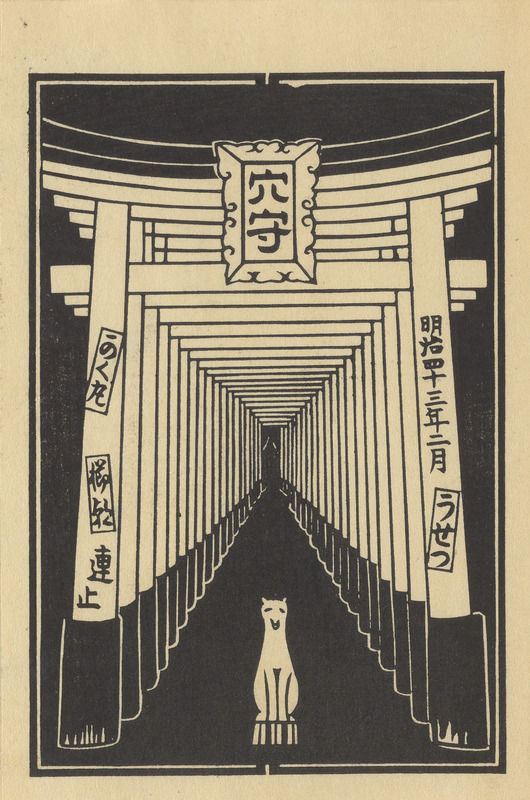
A stone fox statue in front of a series of shrine gates at Anamori Inari, Tokyo

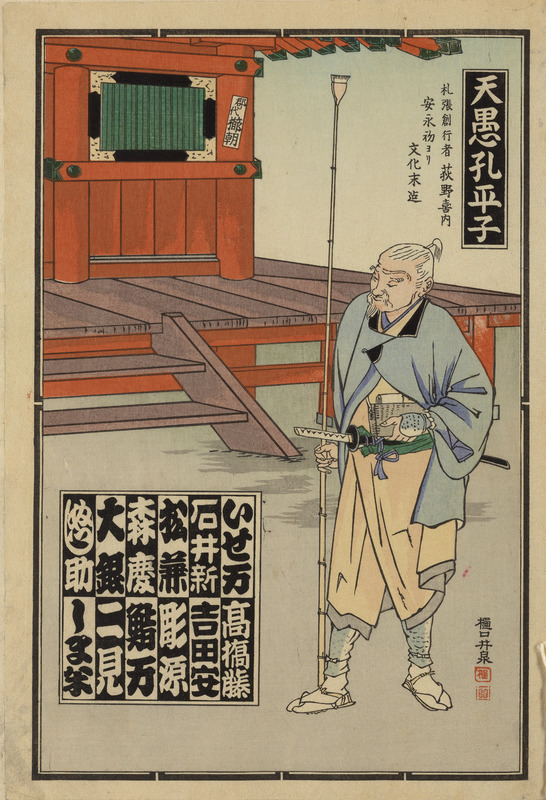
Tengu Kōhei with a box for his senjafuda and pole-mounted brushes used for pasting

== See also ==
- Ofuda
