= Frederick Starr (reverend) =

American clergyman and abolitionist

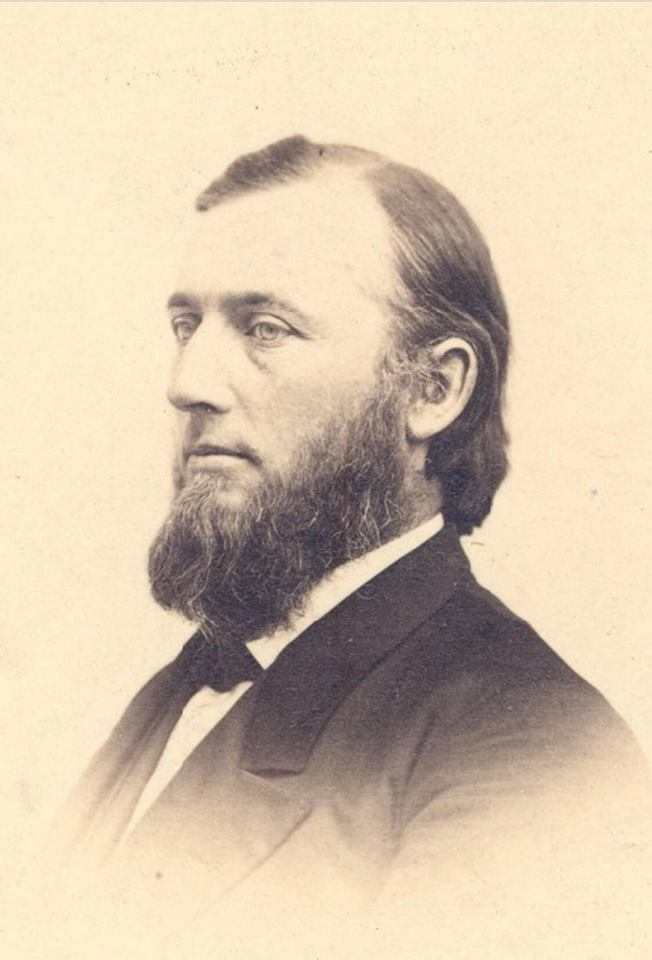
- Born: January 23, 1826; Rochester
- Died: January 8, 1867; St. Louis
- Education: Yale University, Auburn Theological Seminary
- Occupations: Cleric; abolitionist

Frederick Starr (January 23, 1826 – January 8, 1867) was an American clergyman and abolitionist.

== About ==
Starr, was the second son of Frederick and Sarah Starr, and was born in Rochester, New York, January 23, 1826. At the age of ten, he had united with the First Presbyterian Church in Rochester.

He graduated from Yale College in 1846. He turned to preparation for the ministry immediately upon leaving college. After three years in the Auburn Theological Seminary, in 1850 he visited Missouri, laboring for a few weeks in St. Louis as a city missionary, and for some months with the Presbyterian Church in Weston. Toward the end of the same year he was ordained pastor of this church. His location, on the western border of the state, four miles from Fort Leavenworth, exposed him to the agitation concerning the repeal of the Missouri Compromise and the Kansas Border War. Finally, after varied persecution, his declared conviction that slavery was morally wrong obliged him to leave the town in the spring of 1855 to avoid violence.

He spent the next seven years in Western New York as agent of the Western Education Society and Auburn Theological Seminary. Resigning the former of these positions in April 1862, he took charge of the Presbyterian church in Penn Yan, New York, over which he was installed June 12. From April 1865, until his death, he was pastor of the North Presbyterian Church in St. Louis. Starr was the author of a pamphlet, published anonymously, in 1853, entitled Letters for the People, on the Present Crisis, (52 pages, 8vo.) which contained nine letters written from St. Louis, and discussing the influence of slavery upon the opening of Nebraska Territory and the building of the Pacific Railroad. This pamphlet had, it is believed, a wide influence. He also published a sermon on Abraham Lincoln's death.

He died in St. Louis, Missouri, of a fever, induced by overwork, on January 8, 1867, at the age of 41.

He was married, in 1850, to Helen Mills, daughter of Henry Mills, a professor from Auburn. He and Helen had three children, including the anthropologist Frederick Starr.

His papers are held at the State Historical Society of Missouri.
