= Maude Kerns =

American artist (1876–1965)

Maude Irvine Kerns
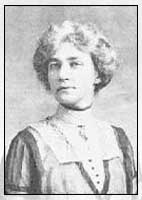
- Born: August 1, 1876; Portland, Oregon, U.S.
- Died: August 19, 1965 (aged 89); Eugene, Oregon, U.S.
- Education: University of Oregon, San Francisco Art Institute; Columbia University
- Movement: Avant-garde

Maude Irvine Kerns (August 1, 1876 – August 19, 1965) was an American artist and art educator, known for her avant-garde paintings. Her works were exhibited at the Guggenheim Museum, National Gallery of Art, and the Salon des Réalités Nouvelles, and earned Kerns considerable notoriety among the abstract art movement in New York. She later taught art at the University of Oregon as well as at high schools in Corvallis and Seattle, Washington before her death in 1965.

== Early life and education ==
Kerns was born in 1876 in Portland, Oregon. She was raised by her pioneer parents, who had migrated to Oregon in 1852 from Indiana. Her father was Samuel Irvine Kerns, and her mother was Elizabeth Claggett; they were married in 1868. Her father was in the Oregon infantry and fought in three Indian wars in 1856, 1865 and 1866. Her mother was a school teacher. She had an older sister, born in 1874, named Edith (married name Edith Kerns Chambers), and two younger brothers, LeRoy Flemming born in 1884, and Harold Claggett, born in 1890. The family moved to Eugene City, Oregon in 1884.

Kerns enrolled in high school in 1891, at the prep school administered by the University of Oregon. She graduated from the University of Oregon in 1899 in a class of thirty-four seniors, with a Bachelor of Arts. In 1900 she attended the Mark Hopkins Institute (now the San Francisco Art Institute) in San Francisco. She moved to New York City in 1904 to attend Teachers College, Columbia University, where she received a diploma in Fine Arts and a Bachelor of Science in Art Education under the guidance of Arthur Wesley Dow. Arthur Wesley Dow described her as "a person of dignity and presence, very quiet in manner, but firm and positive in her opinions".

== Career ==
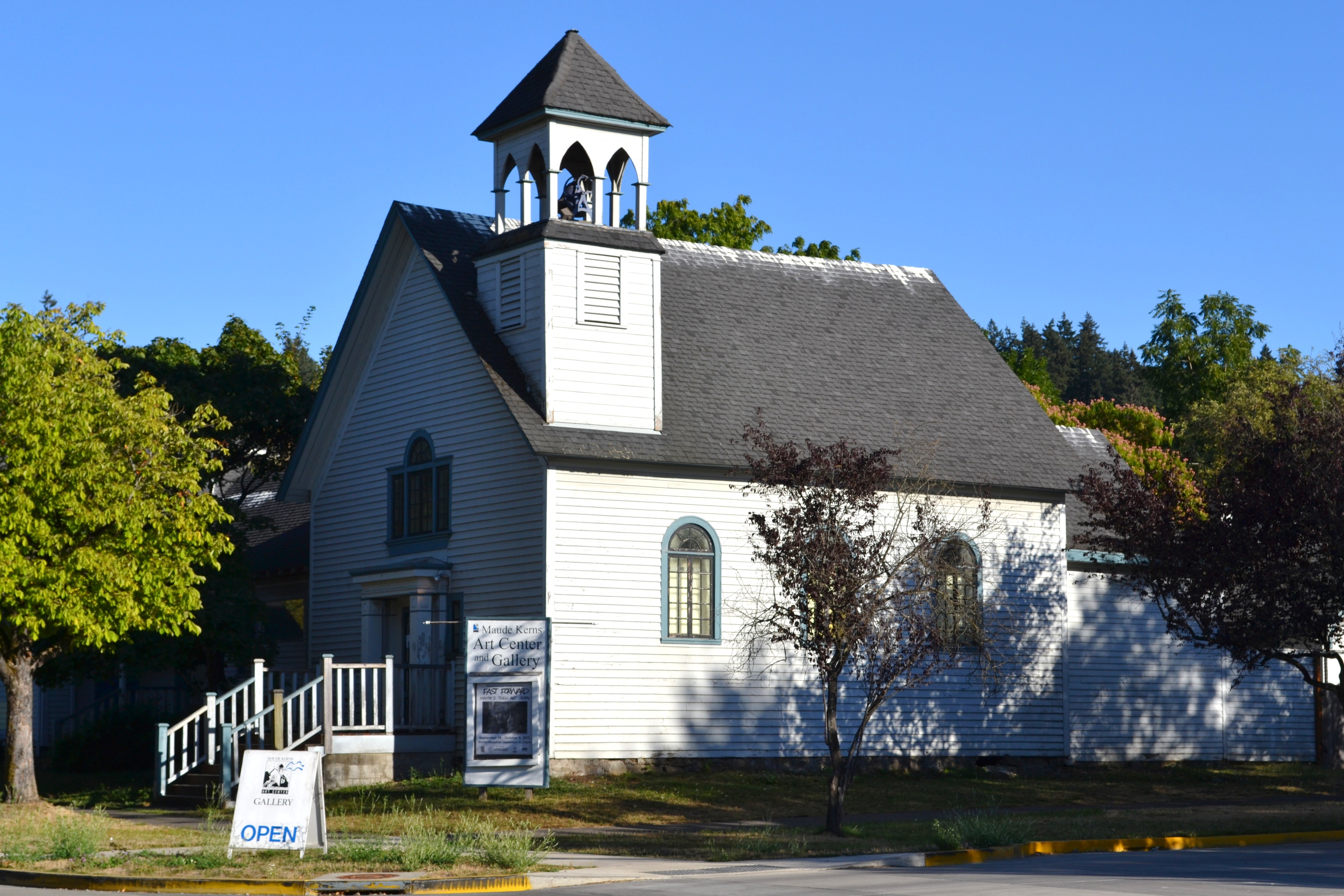
Maude Kerns Art Center in Eugene, Oregon

Prior to moving to New York for school, Kerns taught in Corvallis, Lebanon, and Eugene, Oregon. Kerns taught art in Seattle high schools for fourteen years, after receiving her degree from Columbia. She studied with William Merritt Chase in 1912. She also spent time traveling through Asia and Europe seeing the works of Wassily Kandinsky, Piet Mondrian, Paul Klee and others from the avant-garde art movement, as well as a stint with renowned art teacher Hans Hofmann. Kerns returned to teach at the School of Architecture and Allied Arts at the University of Oregon in Eugene. She was the head of the art education program (also called the Normal Arts Department) from 1921 until 1947, her curriculum was inline with the beliefs and practices of William Morris. She remained until her retirement in the 1940s. Many of her early works were destroyed during a fire at the art school. Kerns was a member of the California WC (watercolor) society and the Oregon Society of Artists.

Her first exhibition of paintings was in 1925 at the Seattle Art Museum as part of their Northwest Annual Show. From the 1930s through the 1950s, Kerns made a name for herself in the world of abstract art, painting in what was called at the time the "non-objective" art movement, being widely known for modernist landscapes. She exhibited work at the Museum of Non-Objective Painting in New York. A spiritual woman, she embraced the art-as-spiritual expression philosophy of Wassily Kandinsky. She was also influenced by Asian art. She was an innovative teacher, being a mentor to University of Oregon professors, she would do things like have her class paint to music to try new styles. Working with Arthur Wesley Dow, Alexander Archipenko contributed to her interest in color and shape relationships. She was also an associate to Albert Patecky. Her paintings were recognized and championed by Hilla von Rebay, chief advisor to Solomon R. Guggenheim, who purchased a number of her paintings, along with art from other standouts in the early American abstract art scene, for his Museum of Non-Objective Painting (later renamed Solomon R. Guggenheim Museum) in New York City.

== Death and legacy ==
Kerns died in 1965, and later The Eugene Art Center (1950), to which she was a major donor and founder of, was renamed The Maude Kerns Art Center in her honor and served to promote her passion for contemporary art. The art center holds a variety of paintings, mixed media, ceramics, and many other modern forms of art.
