= Ofuda =

Shinto and Buddhist talismans

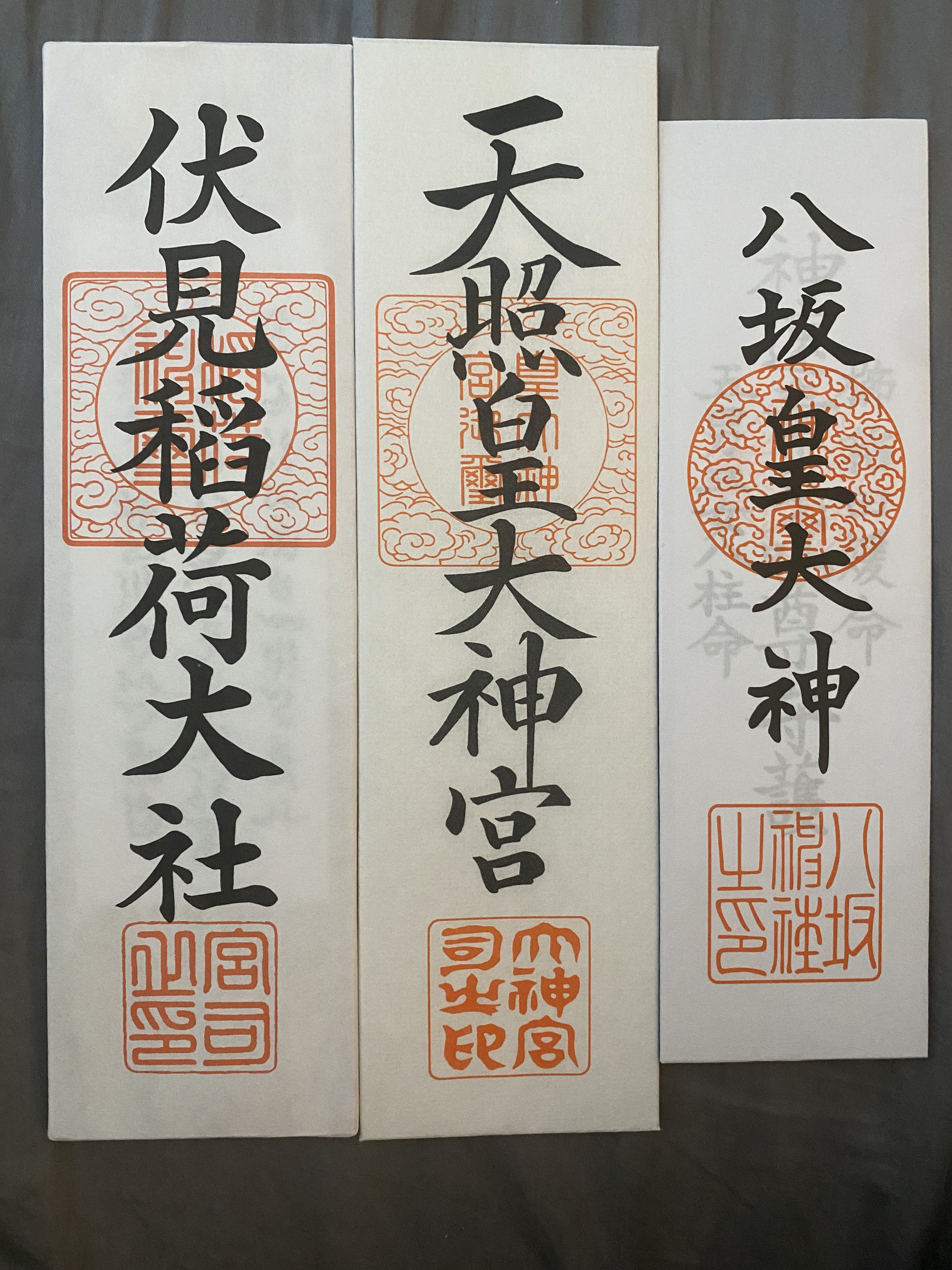
The Jingū taima (神宮大麻), an ofuda (shinsatsu) issued by the Grand Shrines of Ise (center) flanked by the ofuda of Yasaka Shrine (right) and Fushimi Inari-taisha (left)

In Shinto and Buddhism in Japan, an ofuda (お札/御札; honorific form of fuda, 'slip [of paper], card, plate') or gofu (護符) is a talisman made out of various materials such as paper, wood, cloth or metal. Ofuda are commonly found in both Shinto shrines and Buddhist temples and are considered to be imbued with the power of the deities (kami) or Buddhist figures revered therein.

Certain kinds of ofuda are intended for a specific purpose (such as protection against calamity or misfortune, safety within the home, or finding love) and may be kept on one's person or placed on other areas of the home (such as gates, doorways, kitchens, or ceilings). Paper ofuda may also be referred to as kamifuda (紙札), while those made of wood may be called kifuda (木札). Omamori, another kind of Japanese talisman, shares the same origin as and may be considered as a smaller and portable version of ofuda.

A specific type of ofuda is a talisman issued by a Shinto shrine on which is written the name of the shrine or its enshrined kami and stamped with the shrine's seal. Such ofuda, also called shinsatsu (神札), go-shinsatsu (御神札) or shinpu (神符), are often placed on household Shinto altars (kamidana) and revered both as a symbol of the shrine and its deity (or deities) – containing the kami's essence or power by virtue of its consecration – and a medium through which the kami in question can be accessed by the worshiper. In this regard they are somewhat similar to (but not the same as) goshintai, physical objects which serve as repositories for kami in Shinto shrines.

In a similar vein, Buddhist ofuda are regarded as imbued with the spirit and the virtue of buddhas, bodhisattvas, or other revered figures of the Buddhist pantheon, essentially functioning in many cases as a more economic alternative to Buddhist icons and statuary.

== History ==
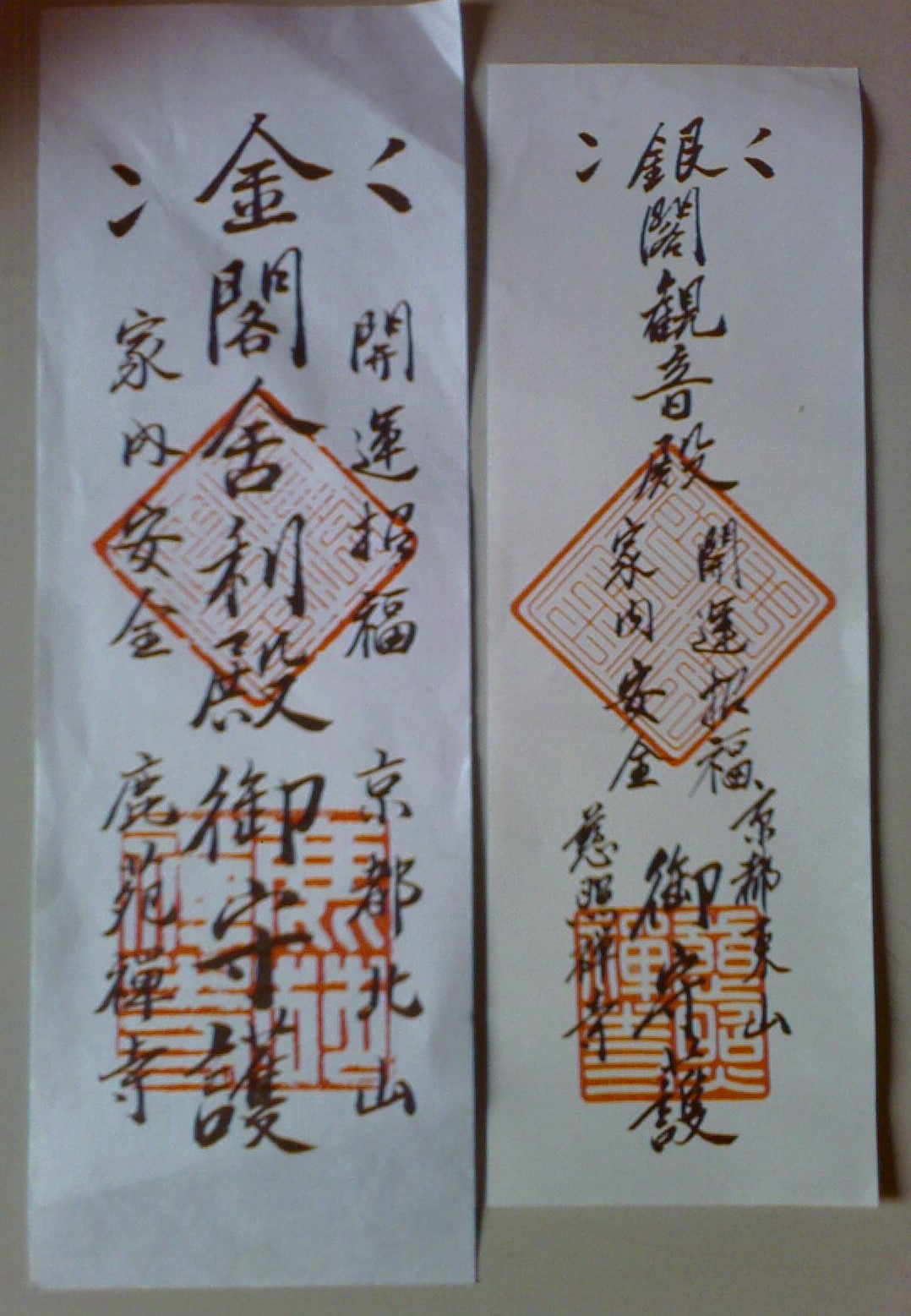
Ofuda (gofu) distributed in Kinkakuji (left) and Ginkakuji (right) in Kyoto. These also serve as admission tickets to the temples.

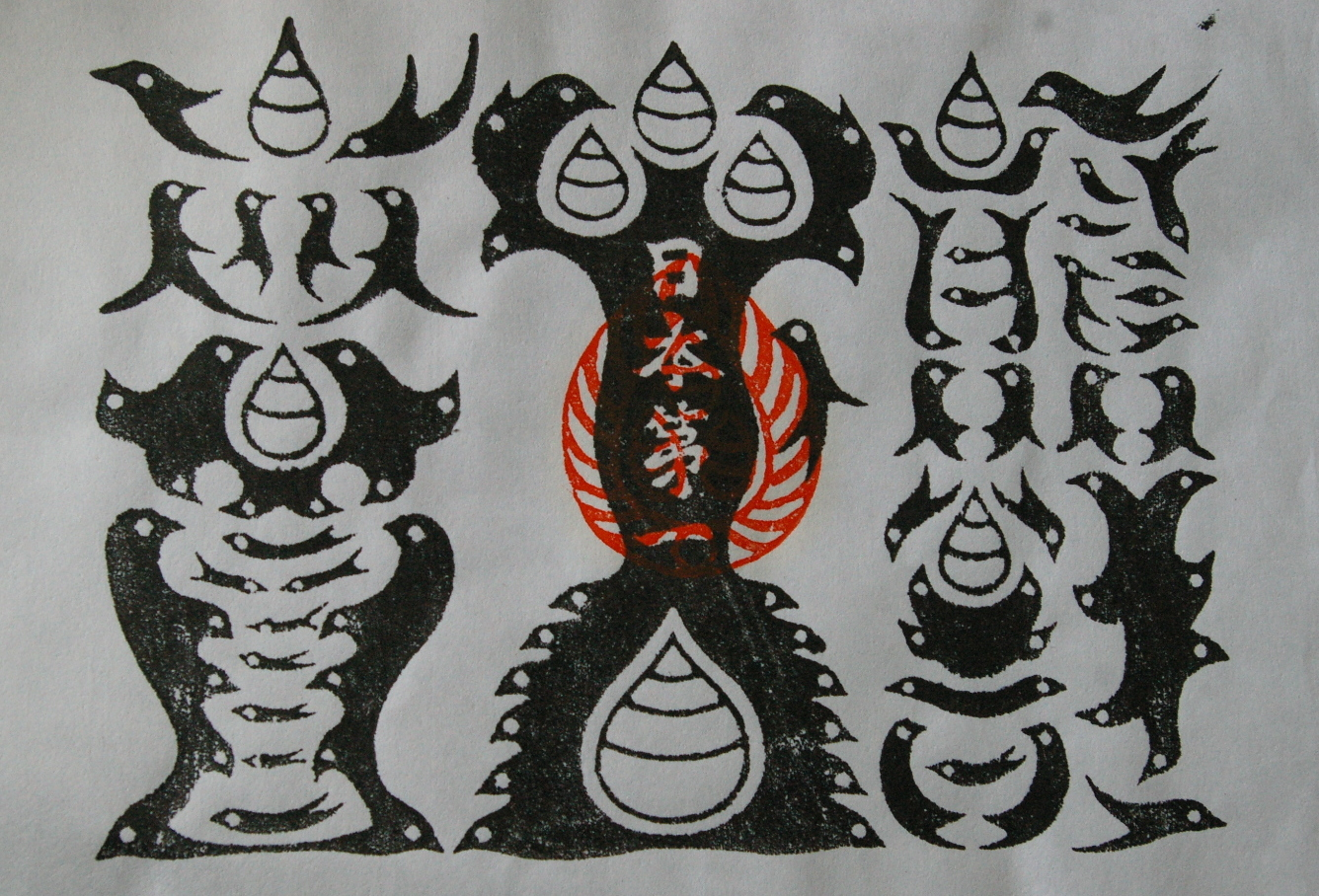
A goōfu (牛王符) from Kumano Hongū Taisha in Wakayama Prefecture

The origins of Shinto and Buddhist ofuda may be traced from both the Taoist lingfu, introduced to Japan via Onmyōdō (which adopted elements of Taoism), and woodblock prints of Buddhist texts and images produced by temples since the Nara and Heian periods. During the medieval period, the three shrines of Kumano in Wakayama Prefecture stamped their paper talismans on one side with intricate designs of stylized crows and were called Kumano Goōfu (熊野牛王符, 'Kumano Ox King Talismans') or the Goōhōin (牛王宝印). At the time, these and similar gofu were often employed in oath taking and contract drafting, with the terms of the oath or agreement being written on the blank side of the sheet.

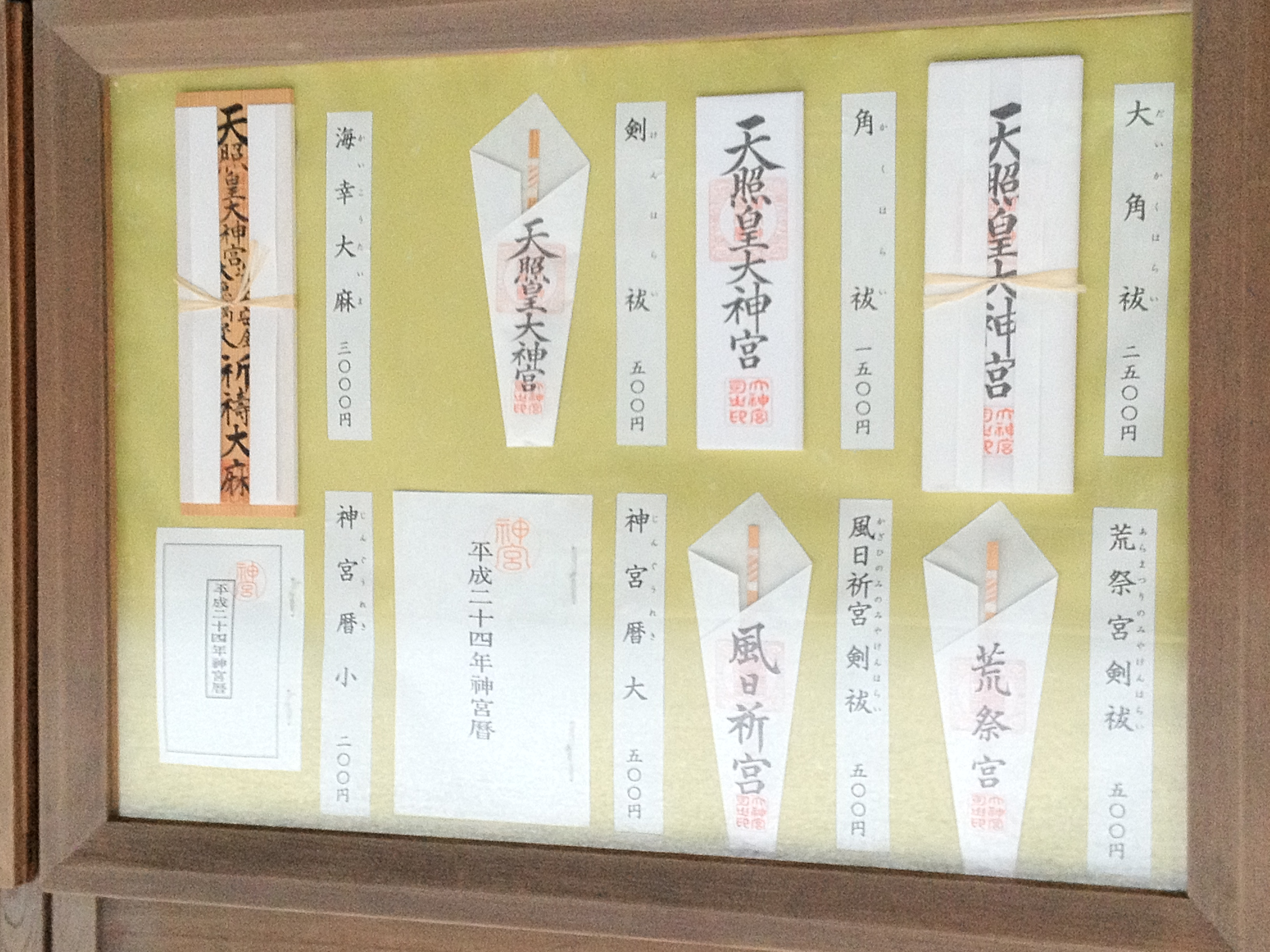
Different types of Jingū Taima (upper row) and other talismans distributed in the Inner Shrine (Naikū) of Ise. From left: Kaikō taima (海幸大麻) (a kind of kifuda for luck in fishing), kenharai (剣祓), kakuharai (角祓), and daikakuharai (大角祓) (a larger version of kakuharai).

The shinsatsu currently found in most Shinto shrines meanwhile are modeled after the talisman issued by the Grand Shrines of Ise (Ise Jingū) called Jingū Taima (神宮大麻). Jingū Taima were originally purification wands (祓串, haraegushi) that wandering preachers associated with the shrines of Ise (御師, oshi or onshi), a term derived from okitōshi, "prayer-performer," denoting religious officials who guided pilgrims (sankei) around the shrine and performed prayers (kitō) on their behalf) handed out to devotees across the country as a sign and guarantee that prayers were conducted on their behalf. These wands, called Oharai Taima (御祓大麻), were contained either in packets of folded paper – in which case they are called kenharai (剣祓) (also kenbarai), due to the packet's shape resembling a sword blade (剣, ken) – or in boxes called oharaibako (御祓箱). The widespread distribution of Oharai Taima first began in the Muromachi period and reached its peak in the Edo period: a document dating from 1777 (An'ei 6) indicates that eighty-nine to ninety percent of all households in the country at the time owned an Ise talisman.

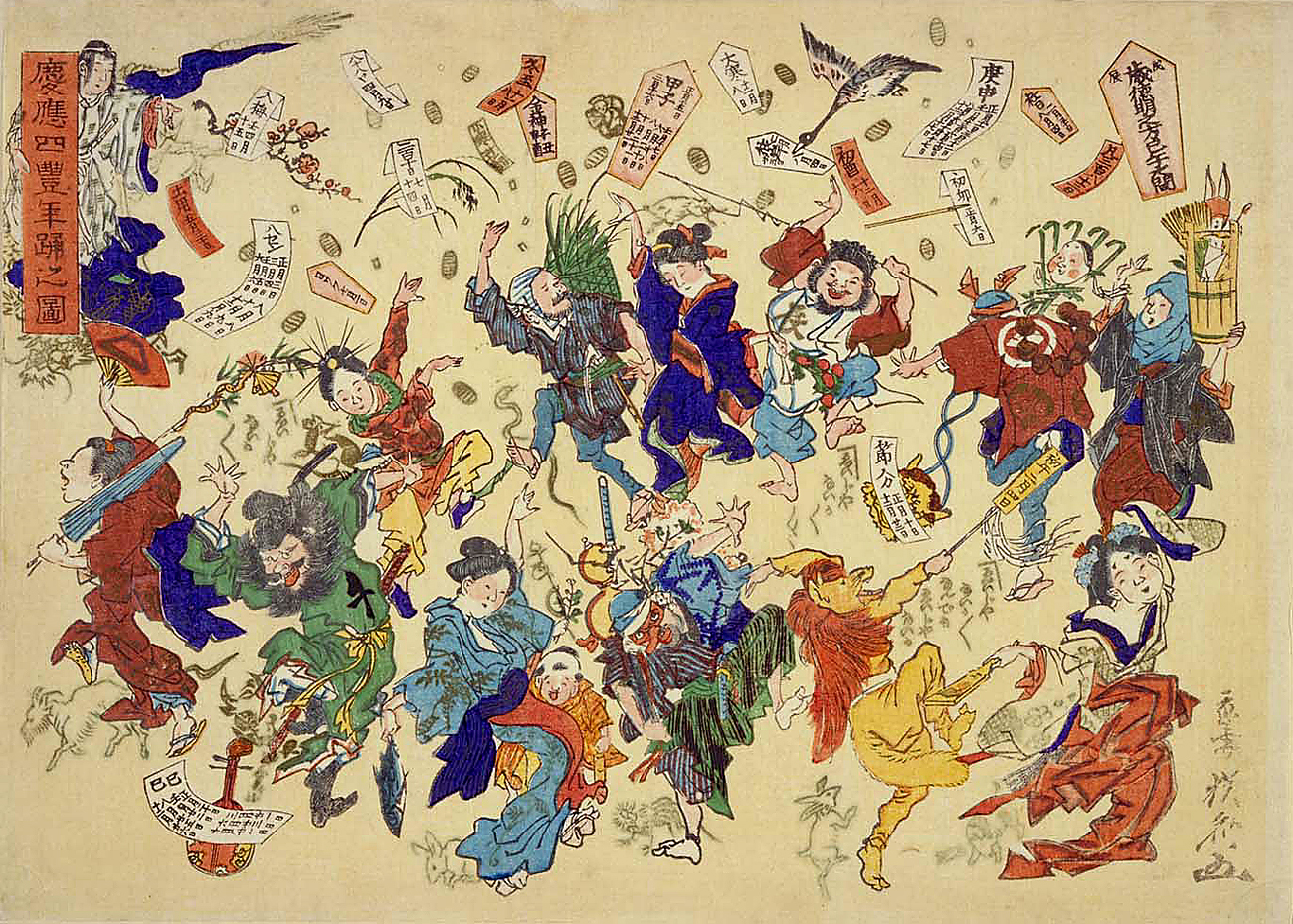
The end of the Edo period witnessed the rise of public festivities and protests known as ee ja nai ka triggered by reports of talismans raining from the sky.

In 1871, an imperial decree abolished the oshi and allotted the production and distribution of the amulets, now renamed Jingū Taima, to the shrine's administrative offices. It was around this time that the talisman's most widely known form – a wooden tablet containing a sliver of cedar wood known as gyoshin (御真, "sacred core") wrapped in paper on which is printed the shrine's name (Tenshō Kōtai Jingū (天照皇大神宮)) and stamped with the seals of the shrine (Kōtai Jingū Gyoji (皇大神宮御璽)) and its high priest (Daijingūji no In (大神宮司之印)) – developed. In 1900, a new department, the Kanbesho (神部署, Department of Priests), took over production and distribution duties. The distribution of Jingū Taima was eventually delegated to the National Association of Shinto Priests (全国神職会, Zenkoku Shinshokukai) in 1927 and finally to its successor, the Association of Shinto Shrines, after World War II. The Association nowadays continues to disseminate Jingū Taima to affiliated shrines throughout Japan, where they are made available alongside the shrines' own amulets.

== Varieties and usage ==
Ofuda come in a variety of forms. Some are slips or sheets of paper, others like the Jingū Taima are thin rectangular plaques (kakubarai/kakuharai (角祓)) enclosed in an envelope-like casing (which may further be covered in translucent wrapping paper), while still others are wooden tablets (kifuda) which may be smaller or larger than regular shinsatsu. Some shrines distribute kenharai, which consists of a sliver of wood placed inside a fold of paper. The Oharai Taima issued by the shrines of Ise before the Meiji period were usually in the form of kenharai; while the kakuharai variety is currently more widespread, Jingū Taima of the kenharai type are still distributed in Ise Shrine.

Ofuda and omamori are available year round in many shrines and temples, especially in larger ones with a permanent staff. As these items are sacred, they are technically not 'bought' but rather 'received' (授かる, sazukaru) or ukeru (受ける), with the money paid in exchange for them being considered to be a donation or offering (初穂料, hatsuhoryō; literally 'first fruit fee'). One may also receive a wooden talisman called a kitōfuda (祈祷札) after having formal prayers or rituals (kitō (祈祷)) performed on one's behalf in these places of worship.

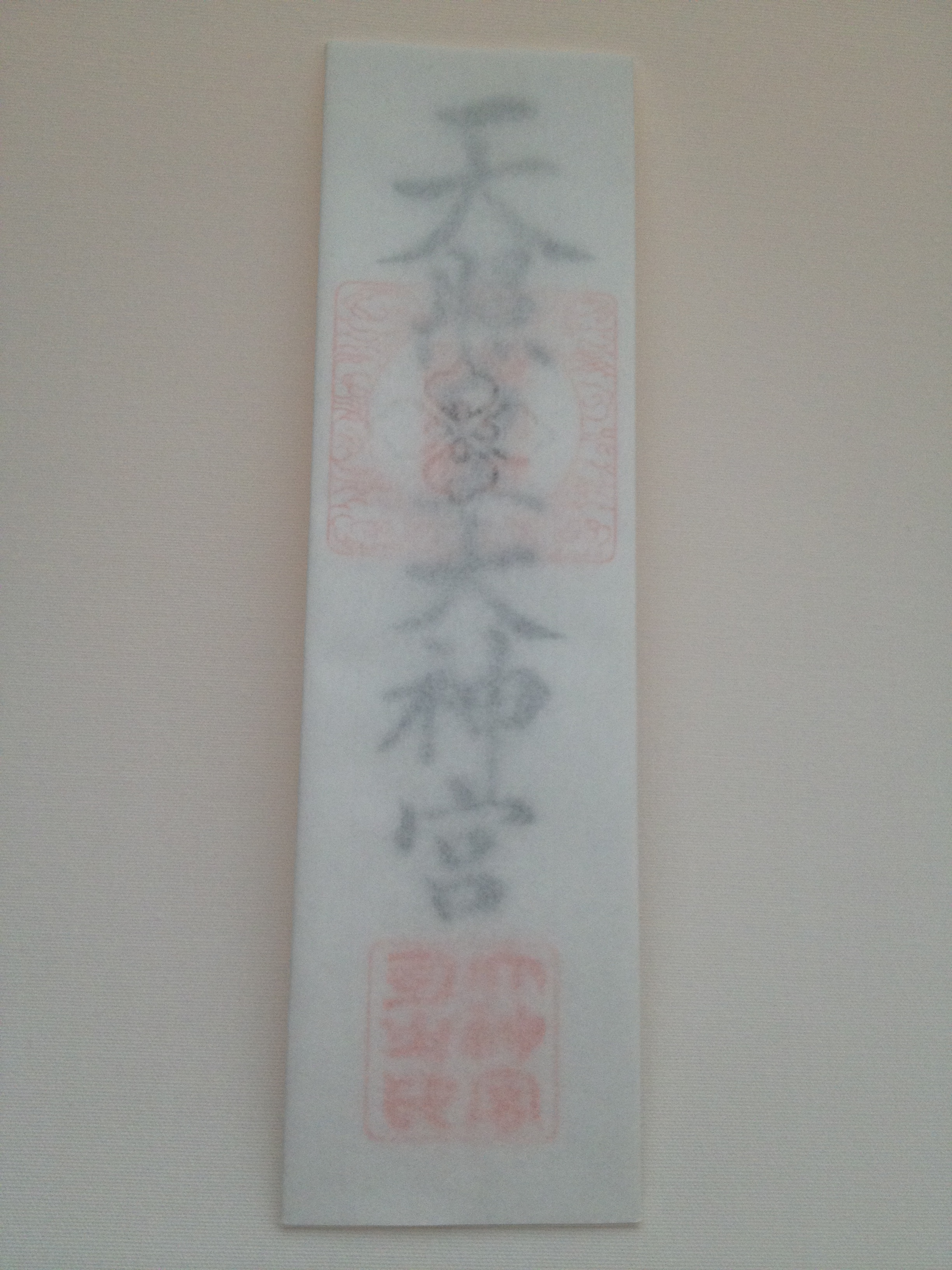
A Jingū Taima still in its translucent paper wrapper. This cover may be removed when setting up the talisman in a kamidana.

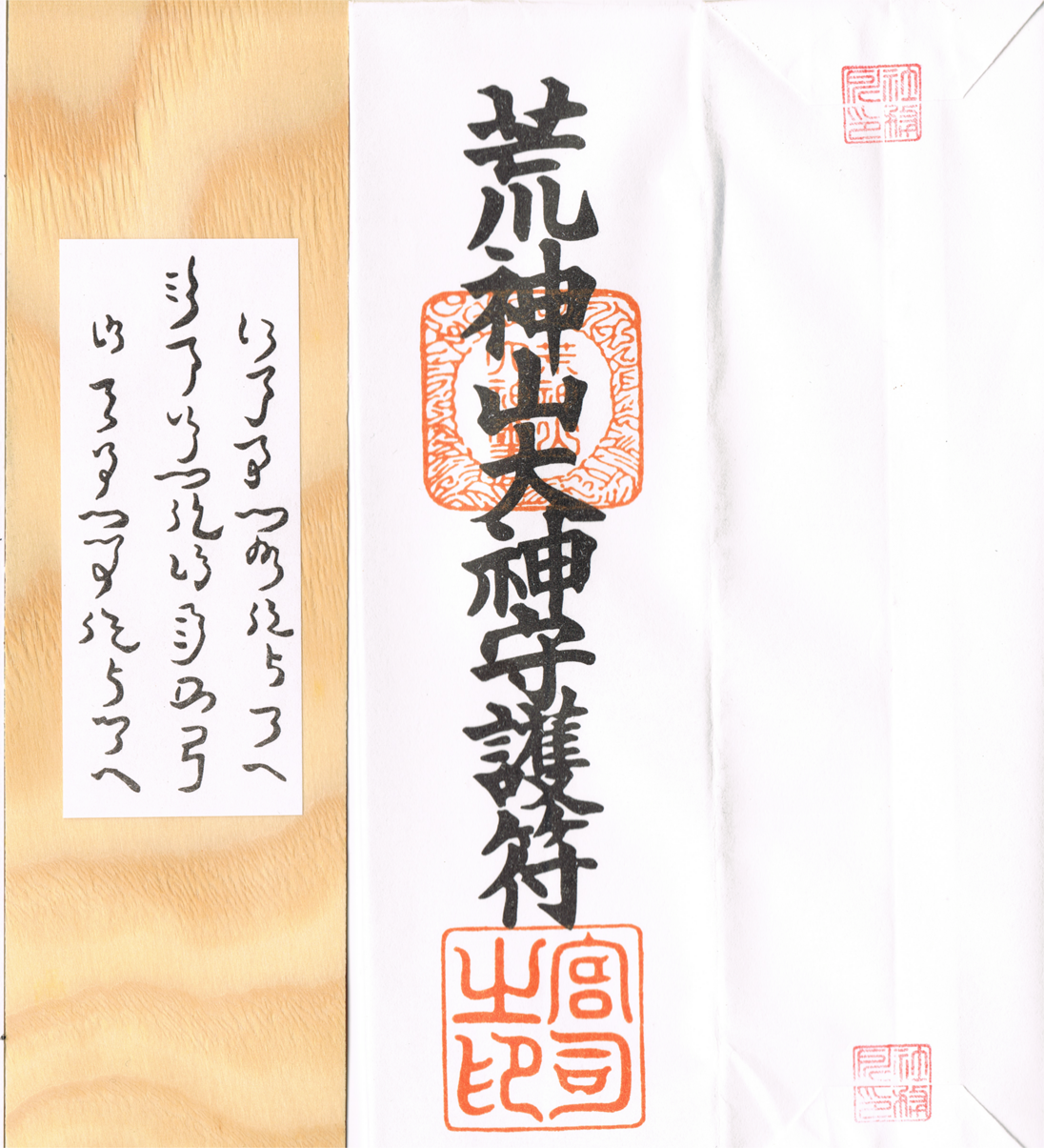
An example of a shinsatsu (from Kōjinyama Shrine in Shiga Prefecture): a plaque with the names of the shrine's kami – Homusubi, Okitsuhiko and Okitsuhime – written in Jindai moji and its paper casing on which is written the name of the shrine or the epithet of its deity – in this case, Kōjinyama-no-Ōkami (荒神山大神; 'Great Deity of Kōjinyama (Shrine)') – and stamped with the seals of the shrine (middle) and its priest (bottom).

=== Shinto ===
Shinsatsu such as Jingū Taima are enshrined in a household altar (kamidana) or a special stand (ofudatate); in the absence of one, they may be placed upright in a clean and tidy space above eye level or attached to a wall. Shinsatsu and the kamidana that house them are set up facing east (where the sun rises), south (the principal direction of sunshine), or southeast.

The Association of Shinto Shrines recommends that a household own at least three kinds of shinsatsu:

1. Jingū Taima
2. The ofuda of the tutelary deity of one's place of residence (ujigami)
3. The ofuda of a shrine one is personally devoted to sūkei jinja (崇敬神社)

In a 'three-door' style (三社造, sansha-zukuri) altar, the Jingū Taima is placed in the middle, with the ofuda of one's local ujigami on its left (observer's right) and the ofuda of one's favourite shrine on its right (observer's left). Alternatively, in a 'one-door' style (一社造, issha-zukuri) kamidana, the three talismans are laid on top of one another, with the Jingū Taima on the front. One may own more shinsatsu; these are placed on either side of or behind the aforementioned three. Regular (preferably daily) worship before the shinsatsu or kamidana and offerings of rice, salt, water, and/or sake to the kami (with additional foodstuffs being offered on special occasions) are recommended. The manner of worship is similar to those performed in shrines: two bows, two claps, and a final bow, though a prayer (norito) – also preceded by two bows – may be recited before this.

Other ofuda are placed in other parts of the house. For instance, ofuda of patron deities of the hearth – Sanbō-Kōjin in Buddhism, Kamado-Mihashira-no-Kami (the 'Three Deities of the Hearth': Kagutsuchi, Okitsuhiko and Okitsuhime) in Shinto – are placed in the kitchen. In toilets, a talisman of the Buddhist wrathful deity Ucchuṣma (Ususama Myōō), who is believed to purify the unclean, may be installed. Protective gofu such as Tsuno Daishi (角大師, 'Horned Great Master'), a depiction of the Tendai monk Ryōgen in the form of a yaksha or an oni are placed on doorways or entrances.

Japanese spirituality lays great importance on purity and pristineness (tokowaka (常若, lit. 'eternal youth')), especially of things related to the divine. It is for this reason that periodic (usually annual) replacement of ofuda and omamori are encouraged. It is customary to obtain new ofuda before the end of the year at the earliest or during the New Year season, though (as with omamori) one may purchase one at other times of the year as well. While ideally, old ofuda and omamori are to be returned to the shrine or temple where they were obtained as a form of thanksgiving, most Shinto shrines in practice accept talismans from other shrines. (Buddhist ofuda are however not accepted in many shrines and vice versa.) Old ofuda and omamori are burned in a ceremony known either as Sagichō (左義長) or Dondoyaki (どんど焼き), also Dontoyaki or Tondoyaki) held during the Little New Year (January 14 or 15th), the end of the Japanese New Year season.

Various possible ways of arranging ofuda (shinsatsu) in a Shinto altar

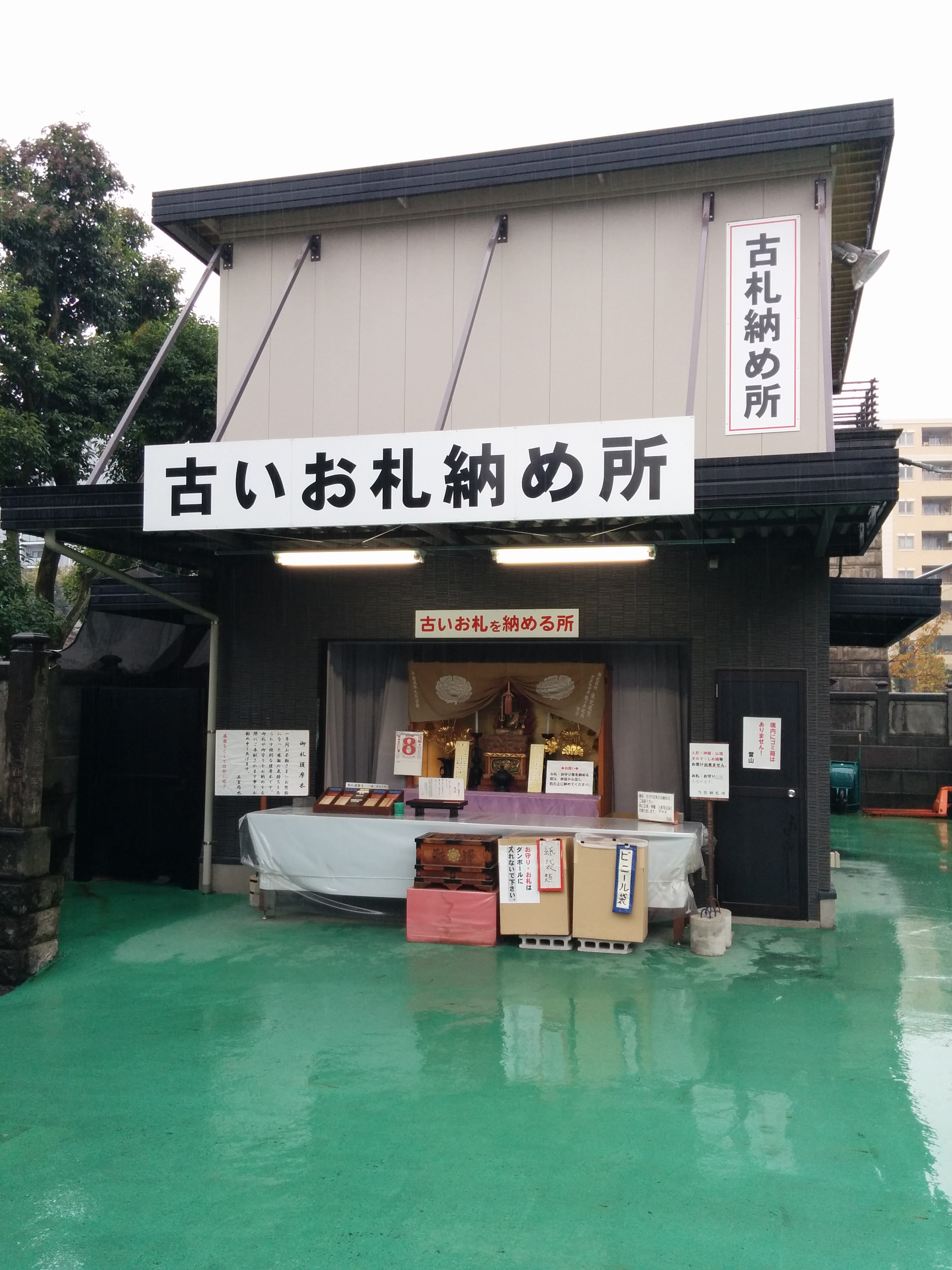
A place for returning old talismans at Fukagawa Fudō-dō Temple in Tokyo

== Gallery ==
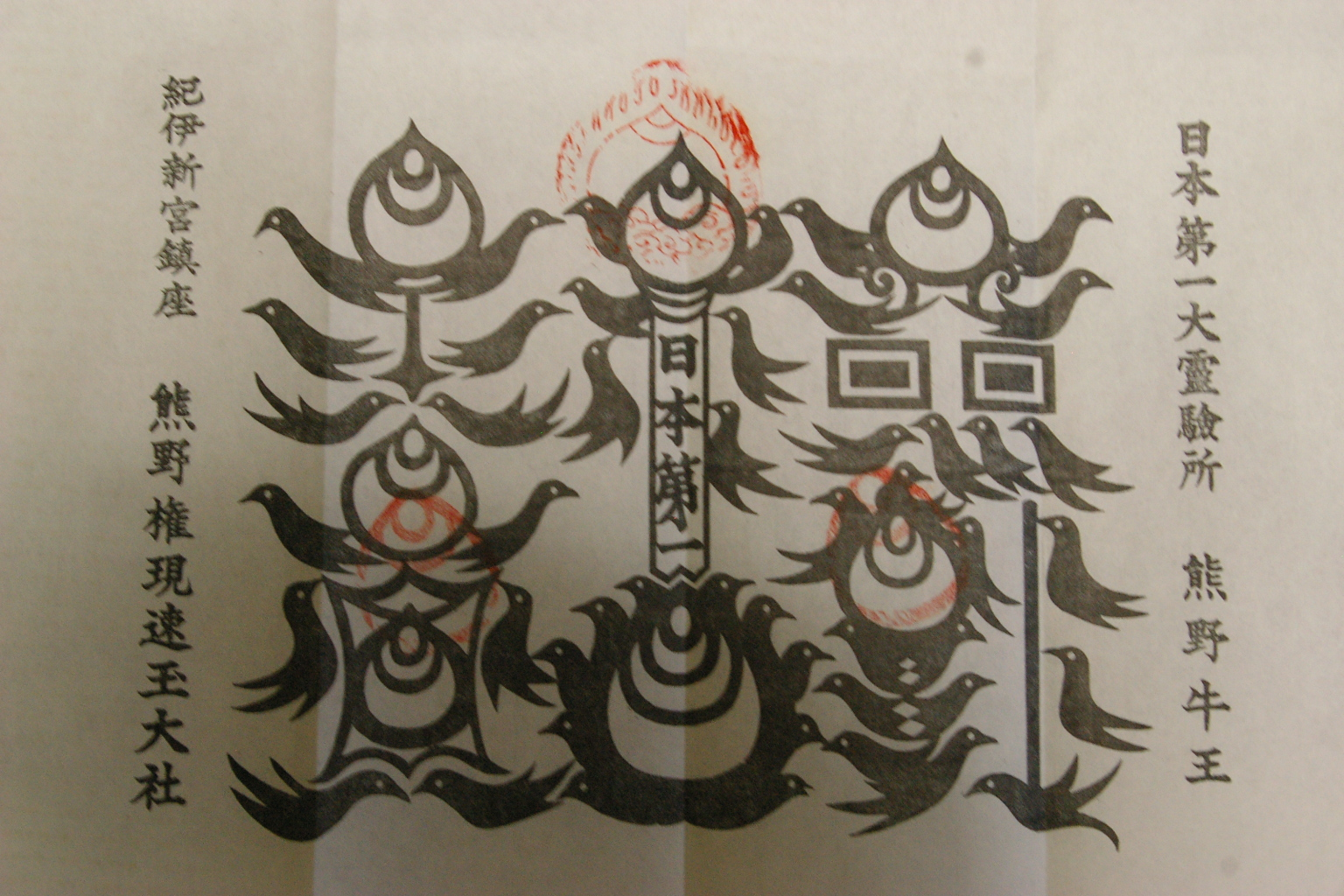
Goōfu from Kumano Hayatama Taisha

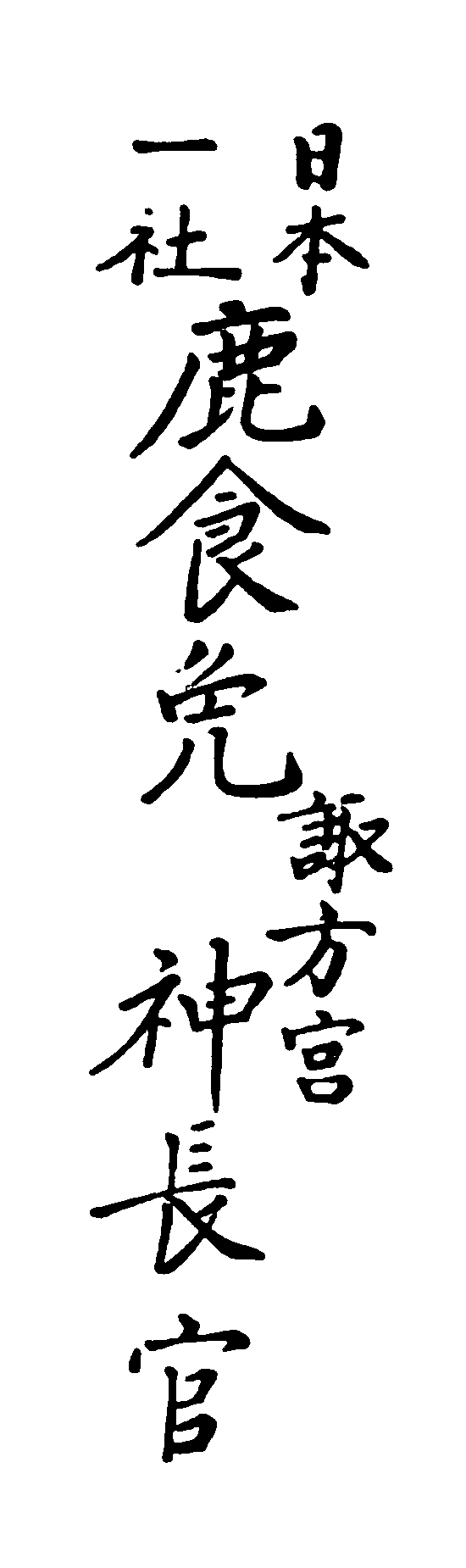
Kajikimen (鹿食免, "permit to eat deer"), a talisman issued by Suwa Shrine in Nagano Prefecture. At a time when meat eating was mostly frowned upon due to Buddhist influence, these were held to allow the bearer to eat venison and other meat without incurring impurity or negative karma.

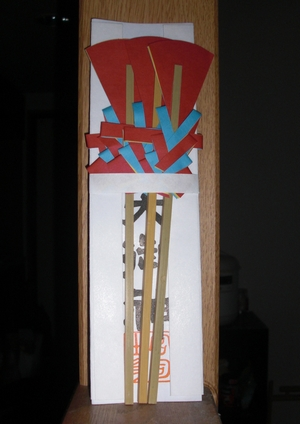
An ofuda of the tutelary deities of the hearth (kamadogami), for use in kitchens (from Nishino Shrine in Sapporo)

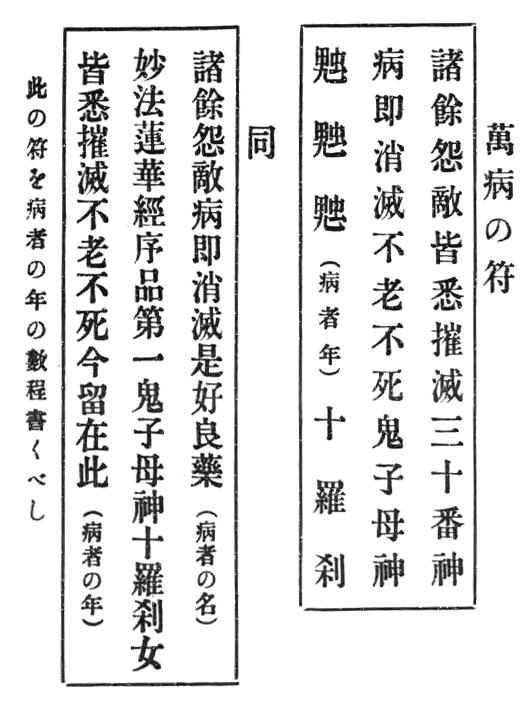
Diagram of two talismans invoking the goddess Hārītī (鬼子母神, Kishimojin'), the Ten Rākṣasīs (十羅刹女, Jū-Rasetsunyo), and the "Thirty Deities" (三十番神, Sanjūbanshin), a Shinto-Buddhist grouping of thirty Japanese kami presiding over the thirty days of a lunar month against disease, from a Nichiren-shū ritual manual

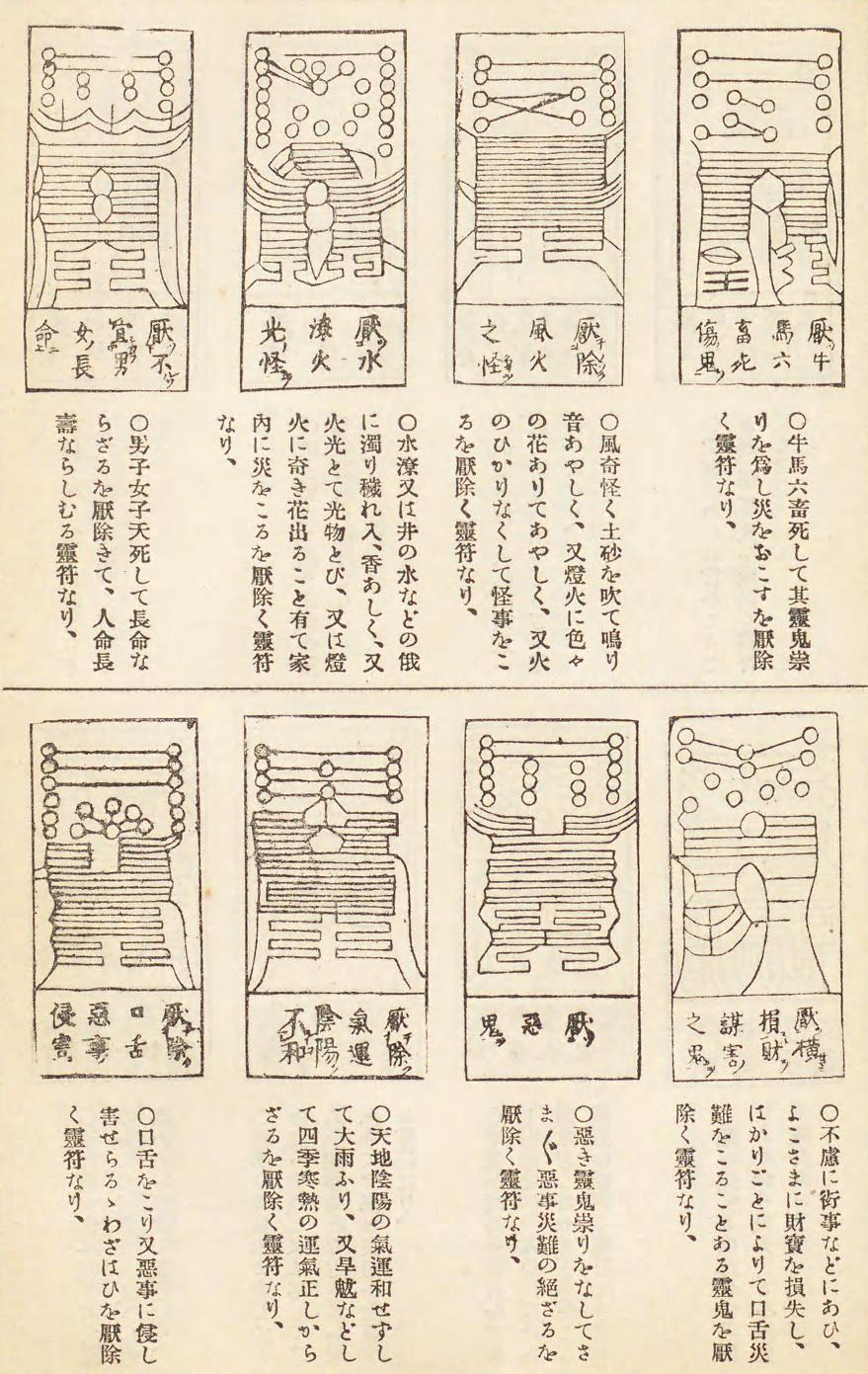
Part of a series of seventy-two talismans (霊符, reifu) (from the Chinese lingfu) known as Taijō Shinsen Chintaku Reifu (太上神仙鎮宅霊符, "Talismans of the Most High Gods and Immortals for Home Protection") or simply as Chintaku Reifu (鎮宅霊符, "Talismans for Home Protection"). Originally of Daoist origin, these were introduced to Japan during the Middle Ages.

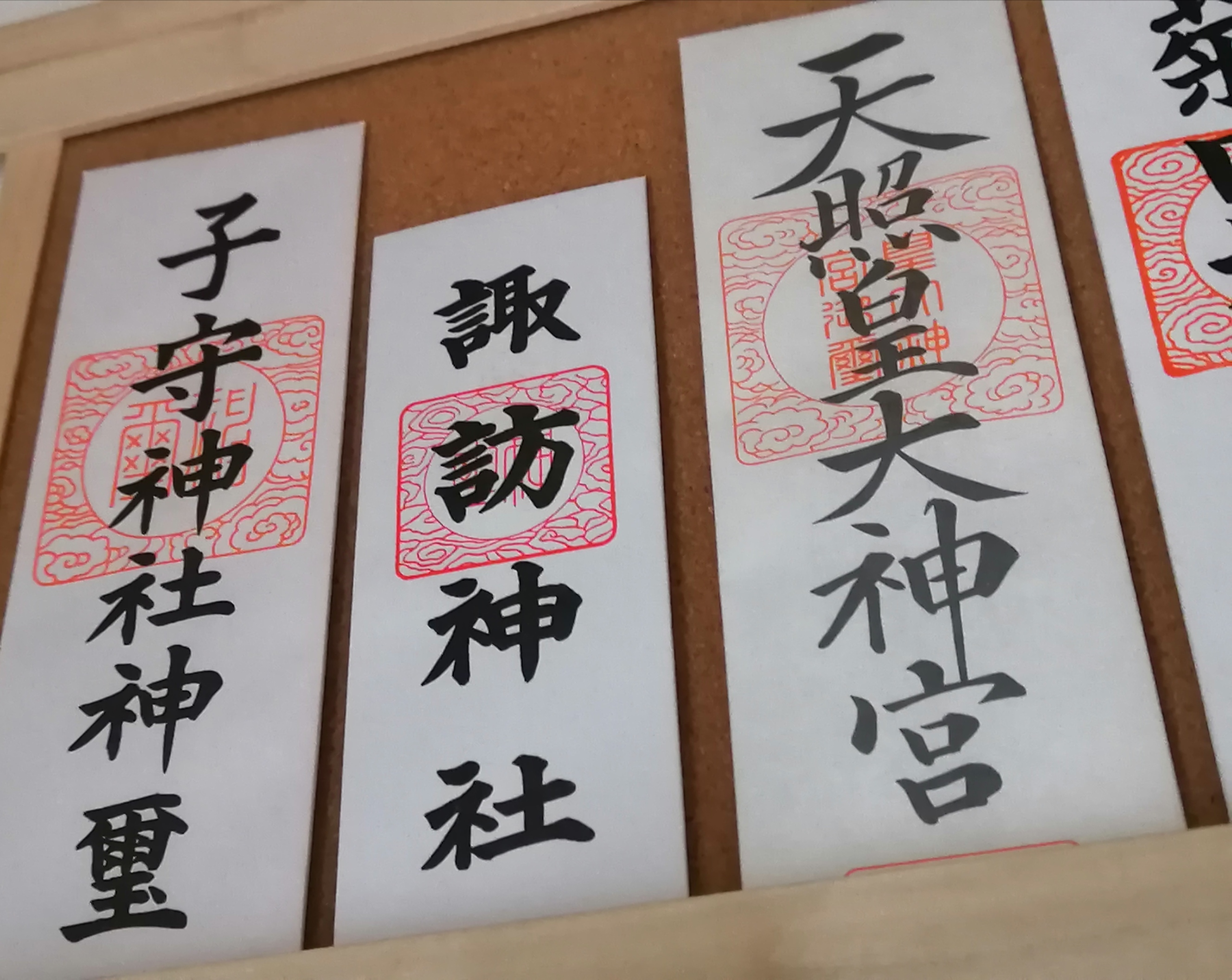
Jingū Taima and other shinsatsu

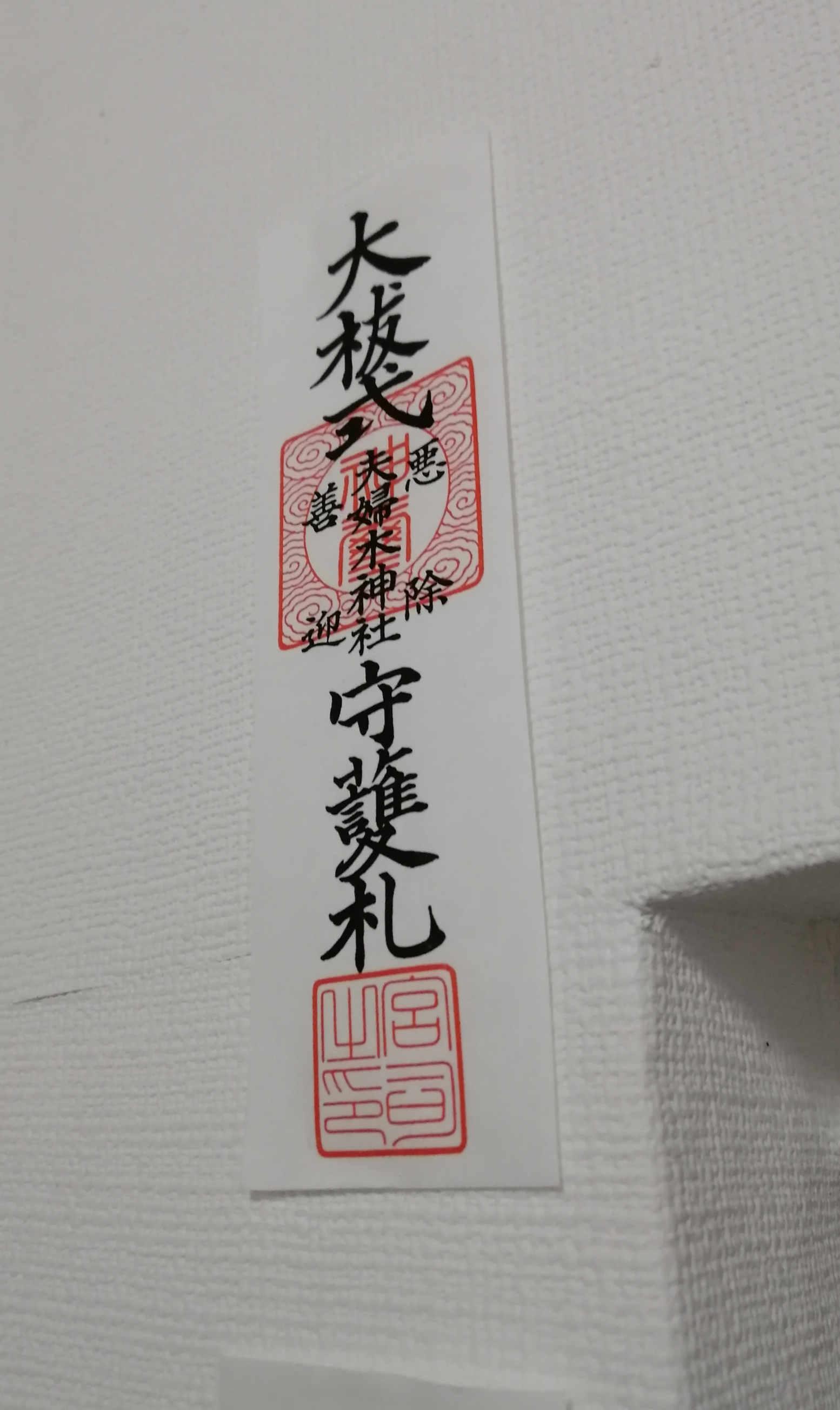
Ofuda posted beside a doorway

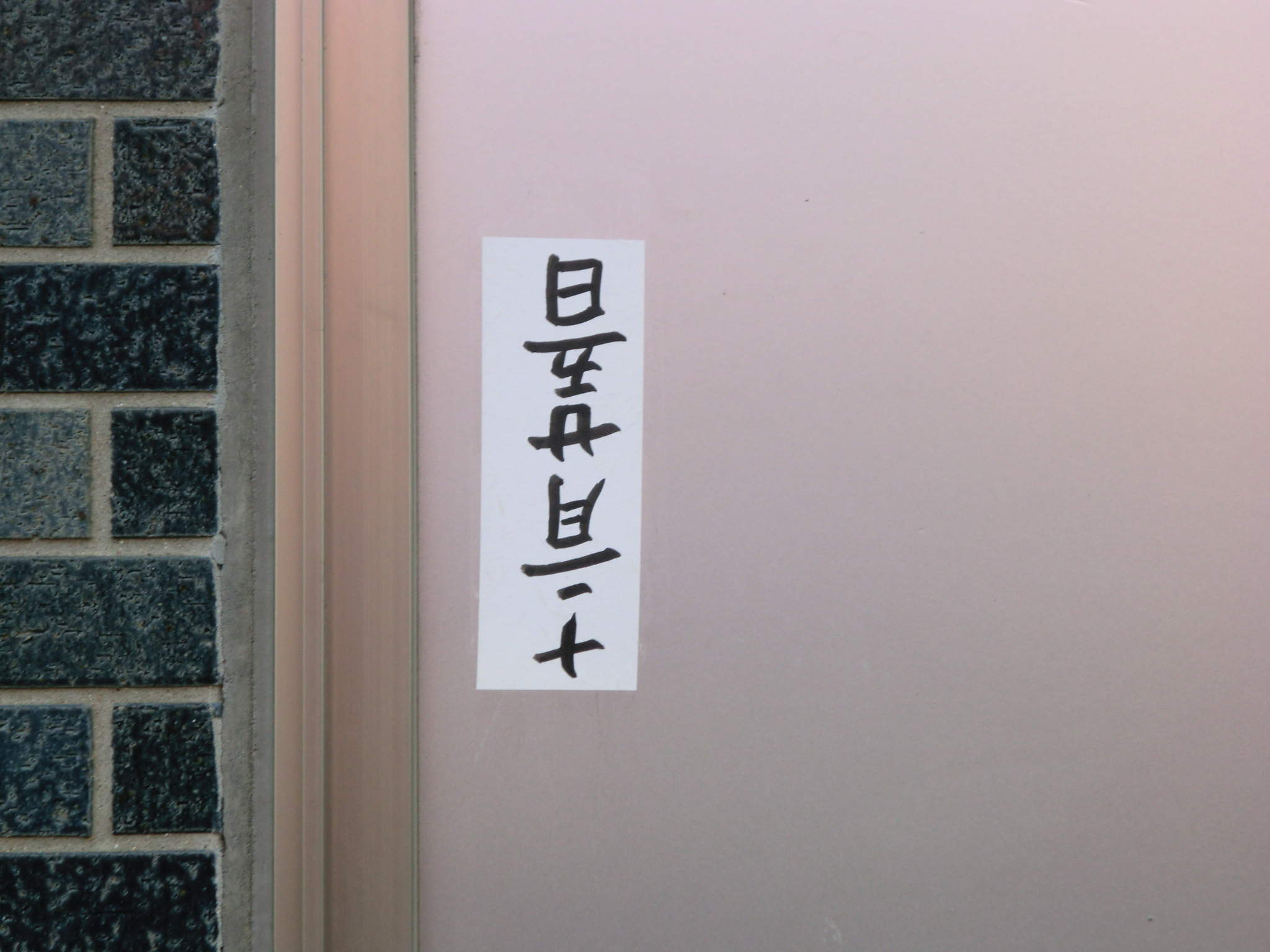
A sakasafuda (逆札, reverse fuda), a handmade talisman against theft displayed upside-down. This ofuda is inscribed with the date the legendary outlaw Ishikawa Goemon supposedly died: "the 25th day of the 12th month" (十二月廿五日). (Note: The diary of contemporary aristocrat Yamashina Tokitsune seemingly indicates that the historical Goemon was executed on the 24th day of the 8th month (October 8th in the Gregorian calendar).) Other dates are written in other areas, such as "the 12th day of the 12th month" (十二月十二日), which is claimed to be Goemon's birthdate.

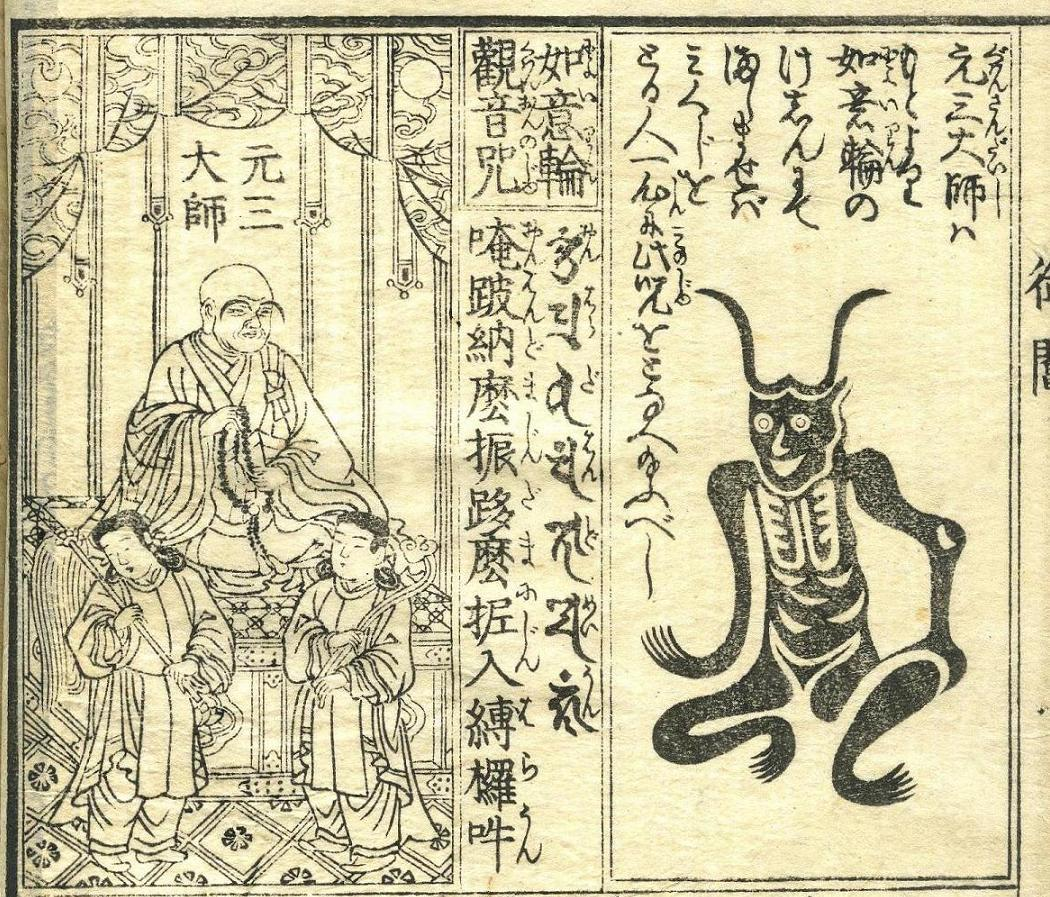
According to legend, the Tendai monk Ryōgen (left) defeated evil spirits by assuming the terrifying form of a horned yaksha or oni (right). Ofuda and omamori bearing this likeness, known as Tsuno Daishi (角大師, "Horned Great Master"), are available in some Buddhist temples.

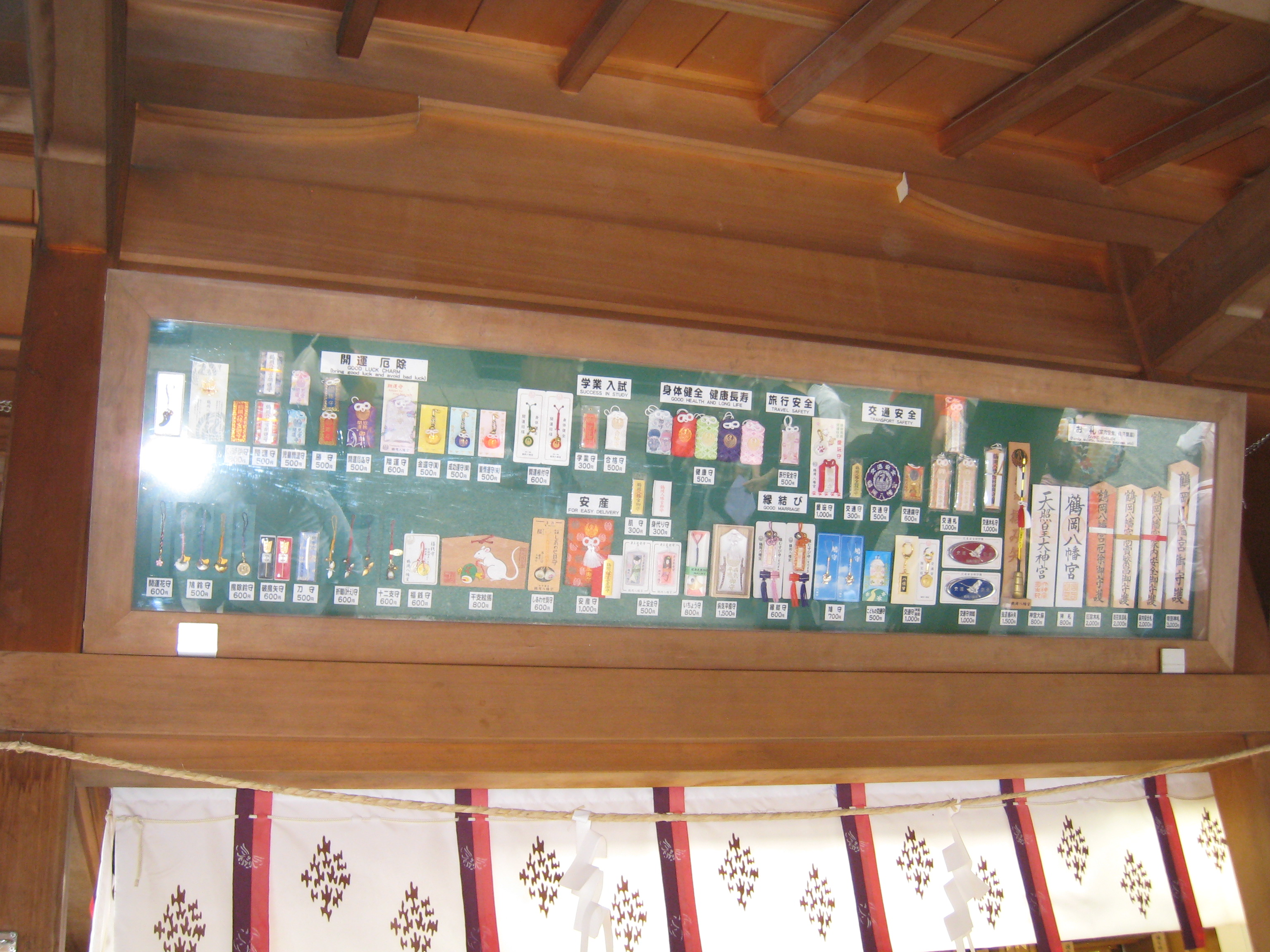
Different types of omamori and ofuda at Tsurugaoka Hachimangū in Kamakura

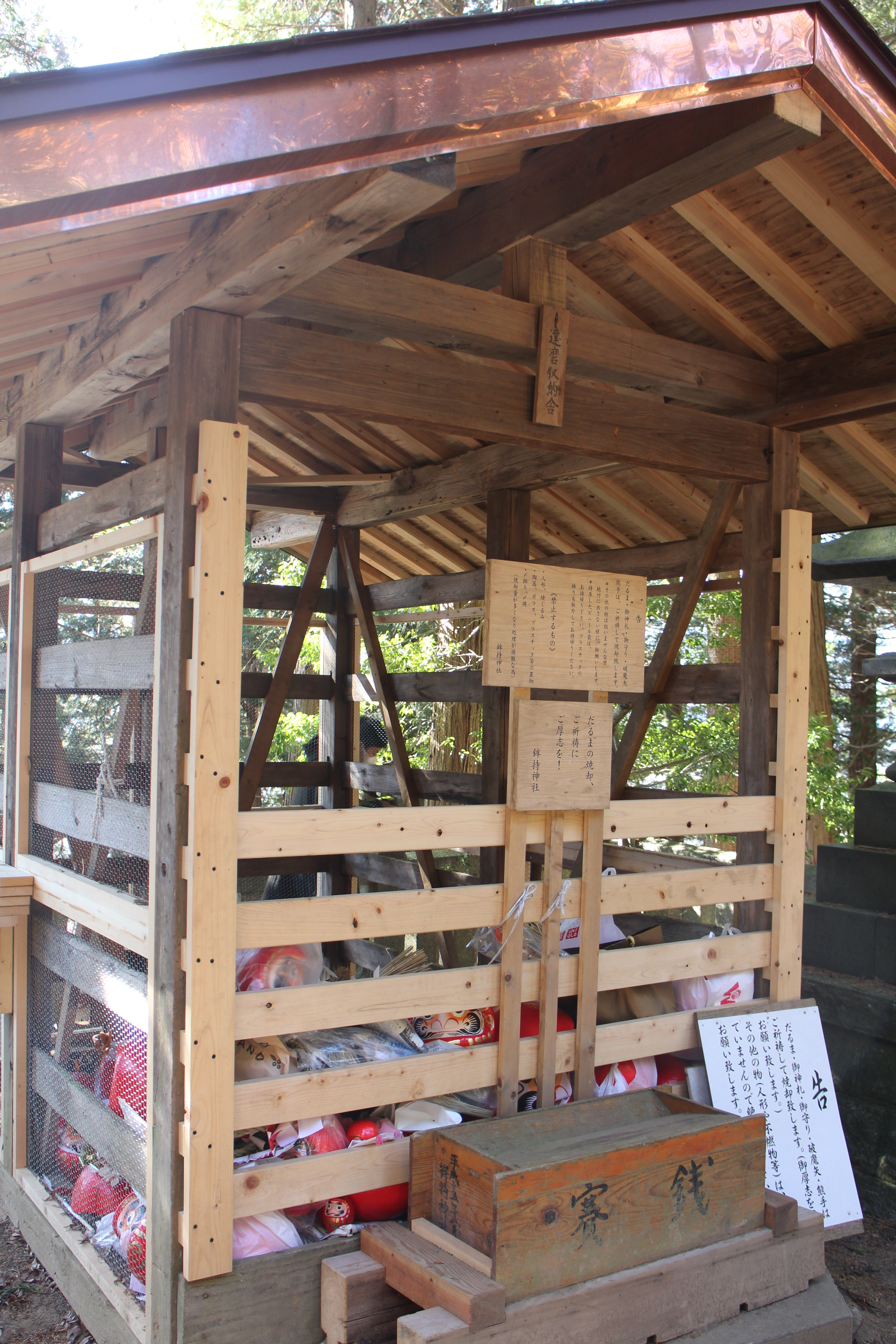
Place for returning old talismans (Hokoji Shrine, Takatō, Ina City, Nagano Prefecture)

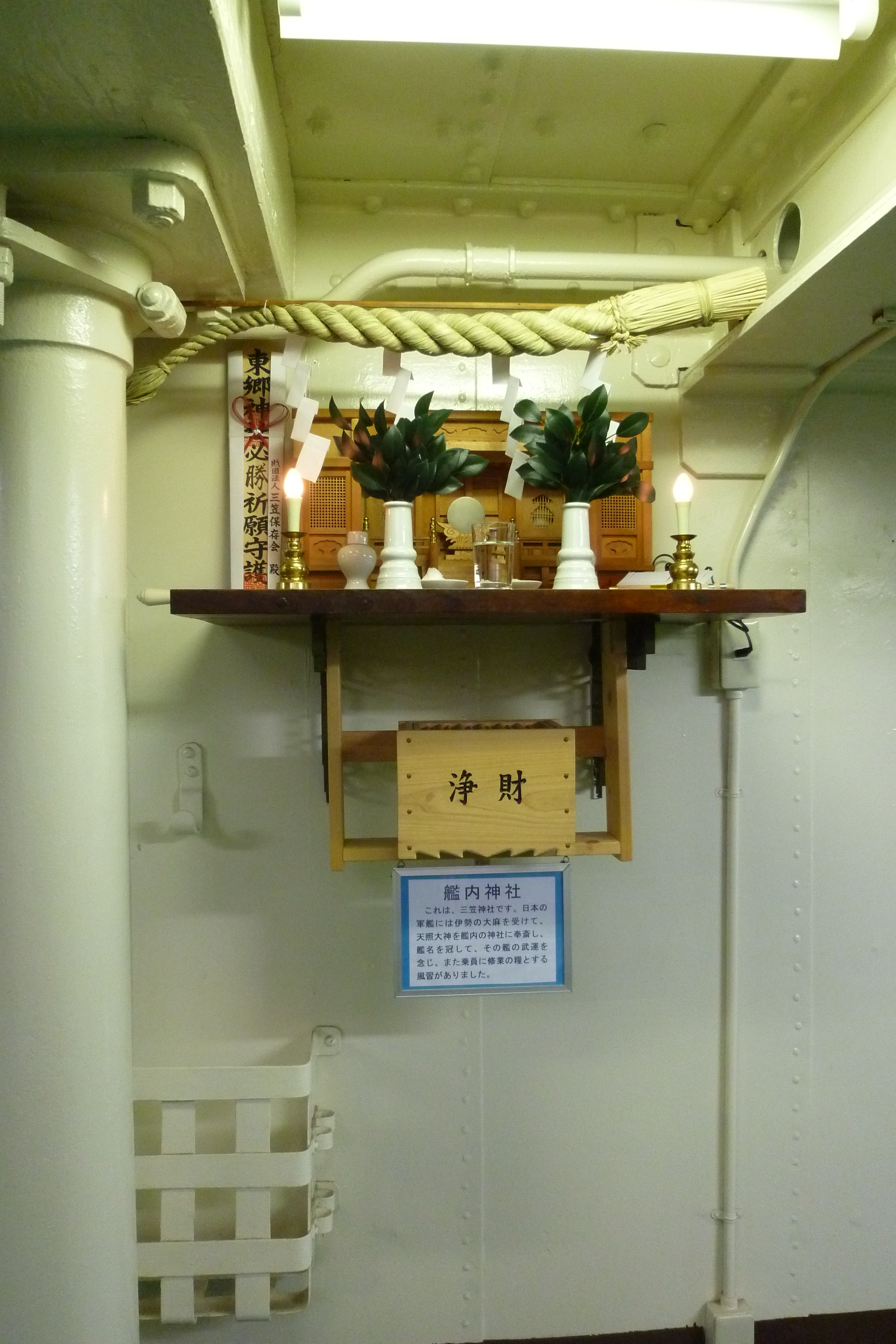
A 'ship shrine' (艦内神社, kannai jinja) inside battleship Mikasa (currently in Mikasa Park in Yokosuka, Kanagawa Prefecture). Beside the altar is a wooden ofuda (kifuda) from Tōgō Shrine (dedicated to the deified naval leader Tōgō Heihachirō, who used Mikasa as his flagship) in Harajuku, Tokyo.

== See also ==
- Bujeok
- Ema
- Fulu
- Himmelsbrief
- Holy card
- Jingū taima
- Murti
- Omamori
- Omikuji
- Onmyōdō
- Onmyōji
- Netsuke
- Senjafuda
- Shikigami
- Thai Buddha amulet
- Votive offering
