= Evelyn Sibley Lampman =

American writer

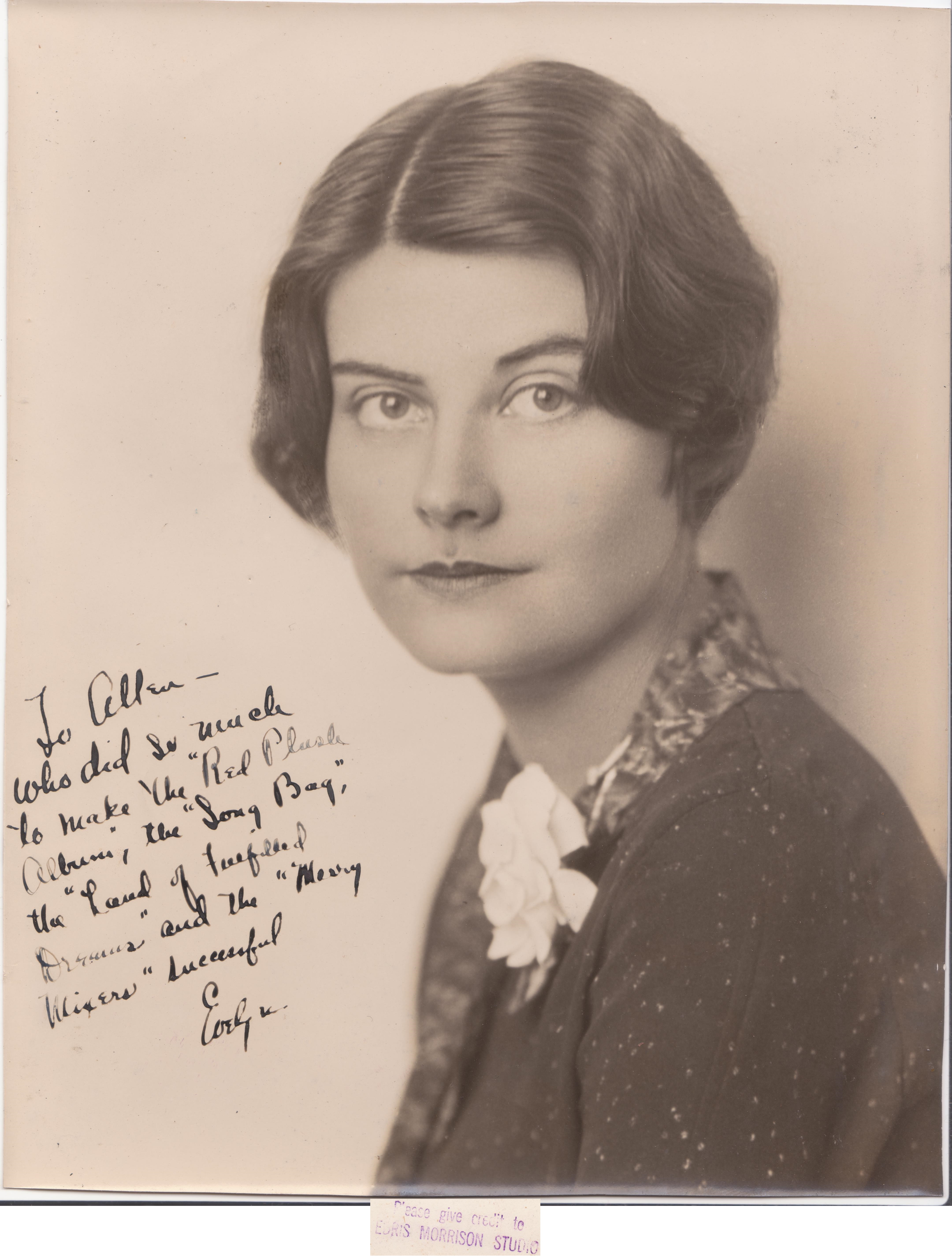
- Lampman in 1932
- Born: Evelyn Maude Sibley; April 18, 1907; Dallas, Oregon
- Died: June 13, 1980 (aged 73)
- Education: Dallas High School
- Alma mater: Oregon Agricultural College
- Occupation: Writer
- Spouse: Herbert Sheldon Lampman
- Children: Linda Sibley Lampman and Anne Hathaway Lampman
- Relatives: Joseph Elmer Sibley and Harriet Bronson
- Writing career
- Pen name: Jane Woodfin, Lynn Bronson
- Genres: Children's and young adult fiction
- Notable works: Of Mikes and Men
- Notable awards: Dorothy Canfield Fisher Award

Evelyn Sibley Lampman (April 18, 1907 - June 13, 1980) was an American writer of children's and young adult fiction. Some of her work was published under the pseudonyms Jane Woodfin and Lynn Bronson.

== Family ==
Evelyn Maude Sibley was born in Dallas, Oregon, to Joseph Elmer Sibley and Harriet Bronson. Harriet was the great-great granddaughter of Nancy Ann Woodfin, from whose surname one of Evelyn's pseudonyms (Jane Woodfin) was derived. Evelyn's father, Joe Sibley, was an attorney and judge in Dallas.

In 1935, Evelyn was married to Herbert Sheldon Lampman, son of Oregon Poet Laureate Ben Hur Lampman. Herbert wrote for The Oregonian as wildlife editor. They had two children, Linda Sibley Lampman (1936) and Anne Hathaway Lampman (1940) before Herb died in 1943.

== Early adult life and radio career ==
After her graduation from Dallas High School in 1925, Evelyn Sibley attended Oregon Agricultural College (now Oregon State University), graduating in 1929 with a degree in Vocational Education.

Shortly after graduation, she found a newspaper advertisement for a job as continuity writer at KEX radio and decided to apply. Although she had no experience, she was hired and became one of the early names in American radio history.

Lampman documented some of those early radio years in her semi-autobiographical and only adult novel, Of Mikes and Men (1951), billed as a "humorous inside story of radio in its diaper days, when announcers doubled as soundmen and every disc jockey was his own engineer." The book was written under the pen-name Jane Woodfin.

During the next several years, Lampman worked for both KEX and KGW radio stations on and off, first as a continuity writer, then Continuity Chief, writing scripts and programming for various radio shows and dramas.

At the end of 1946, she became the Educational Director at KGW. In this position, she had charge of writing most of the scripts of programming developed for children, which aired in six segments on weekdays with a specific focus for each age targeted school-age group.

== Later life as a novelist ==
In 1947, Lampman's first manuscript was accepted by Doubleday, Doran, & Co. Crazy Creek, a children's novel, was released in August 1948 and enjoyed enough success that it launched a new career for Lampman.

She began producing one or two novels a year, a few under the pen-name of Lynn Bronson, and by 1951 resigned from her position as Educational Director at KGW. In 1952, however, she did accept the role of KEX Advisor-consultant for educational activities.

Lampman was not afraid to tackle sensitive and even controversial subjects in her novels. She addressed re-education of Native American children, racial tensions, child marriage, changing cultures, and migrant workers with sensitivity and an ability to make the stories interesting. She also published some books based on real people, such as The Bounces of Cynthiann, about the orphaned Bounce children who traveled the Applegate Trail and became part of Dallas, Oregon's history and Wheels West: The Story of Tabitha Brown about the woman who traveled the Oregon Trail and founded what would become Pacific University in Forest Grove, Oregon.

Lampman died on June 13, 1980, from bile duct cancer.

== Honors and legacy ==
Lampman was given the Dorothy Canfield Fisher Award in 1962 for her book City Under the Back Steps, a story about two children who shrink down to ant-size and have a sci-fi adventure in the world of ants.

In 1968, Lampman received the honor of a Brotherhood Award from the National Conference of Christians and Jews. She also was the recipient of two Golden Spur Awards from the Western Writers of America. The first in 1967 for Half Breed (tied with Betty Baker's The Dunderhead War) and the second in 1970 for her book about the Whitman Massacre from a Cayuse boy's perspective called Cayuse Courage.

The Evelyn Sibley Lampman Award was established by the Children's Services Division of the Oregon Library Association in 1982 "to honor a living Oregon author, librarian, or educator who has made a significant contribution to Oregon in the fields of children’s literature and library services."

== Works ==
- Crazy Creek, Doubleday, 1948 (illustrated by Grace Paull)
- Treasure Mountain, Doubleday, 1949 (illustrated by Richard Bennett)
- The Bounces of Cynthiann’, Doubleday, 1950 (illustrated by Grace Paull)
- Timberland Adventure, Lippincott, 1950 (written as Lynn Bronson)
- Coyote Kid, Lippincott, 1951 (written as Lynn Bronson)
- Elder Brother, Doubleday, 1951 (illustrated by Richard Bennett)
- Of Mikes and Men, McGraw-Hill, 1951 (written as Jane Woodfin - illustrated by Paul Galdone)
- Captain Apple’s Ghost, Doubleday, 1952 (illustrated by Ninon MacKnight)
- Rogue’s Valley, Lippincott, 1952 (written as Lynn Bronson)
- The Runaway, Lippincott, 1953 (written as Lynn Bronson)
- Tree Wagon, Doubleday, 1953 (illustrated by Robert Frankenberg)
- Witch Doctor’s Son, Doubleday, 1954 (illustrated by Richard Bennett)
- The Shy Stegosaurus of Cricket Creek, Doubleday, 1955 (illustrated by Hubert Buel)
- Darcy’s Harvest, Doubleday, 1956 (written as Lynn Bronson - illustrated by Paul Galdone)
- Navaho Sister, Doubleday, 1956 (illustrated by Paul Lantz)
- Rusty’s Space Ship, Doubleday, 1957 (illustrated by Bernard Krigstein)
- Popular Girl, Doubleday, 1957 (written as Lynn Bronson)
- Rock Hounds, Doubleday, 1958 (illustrated by Arnold Spilka)
- Special Year, Doubleday, 1959 (illustrated by Genia Wennerstrom)
- The City Under the Back Steps, Doubleday, 1960 (illustrated by Honore Valintcourt)
- Princess of Fort Vancouver, Doubleday, 1962 (illustrated by Douglas Gorsline)
- The Shy Stegosaurus of Indian Springs, Doubleday, 1962 (illustrated by Paul Galdone)
- Mrs. Updaisy, Doubleday, 1963 (illustrated by Cyndy Szekeres)
- Temple of the Sun, Doubleday, 1964
- Wheels West, Doubleday, 1965
- The Tilted Sombrero, Doubleday, 1966 (illustrated by Ray Cruz)
- Half-Breed, Doubleday, 1967
- The Bandit of Mok Hill, Doubleday, 1969
- Cayuse Courage, Harcourt Brace World, 1970
- Once Upon the Little Big Horn, Crowell, 1971
- The Year of Small Shadow, Harcourt Brace Jovanich, 1971
- Go Up the Road, Atheneum, 1972
- Rattlesnake Cave, Atheneum, 1974
- White Captives, Atheneum, 1976
- The Potlatch Family, Atheneum, 1976
- Bargain Bride, Atheneum, 1977
- Squaw Man’s Son, Atheneum, 1978
- Three Knocks on the Wall, Atheneum, 1980

== Adaptations ==
The Shy Stegosaurus of Cricket Creek was adapted for CBS Storybreak by J. Michael Straczynski in 1987
