= Grace Paull =

American writer (1898–1990)

- Born: 1898; Cold Brook, New York, U.S.
- Died: 1990 (aged 91–92); Cold Brook, New York, U.S.
- Education: Utica Free Academy; Pratt Institute; Art Students League of New York
- Occupations: Artist; illustrator; author

Grace A. Paull (1898–1990) was an American artist, illustrator, and author. She designed greeting cards, illustrated children's books, and painted people, landscapes and flowers.

== Life and career ==
Paull was born in 1898 in Cold Brook, New York. She went to high school in Montreal, Canada and then Utica Free Academy where she studied under Mabel E. Northrup. She continued her art studies at Pratt Institute in Brooklyn for three years and after graduating from there at Art Students League and Grand Central Art School in New York City.

After art school, Paull designed greeting cards for several years. In 1932, Paull started her career of being a children's book illustrator. She was also the author of some of the books she illustrated.

Paull made her home in Cold Brook, where she lived in the historic Cold Brook Feed Mill.

Paull died in 1990.

== Collections ==
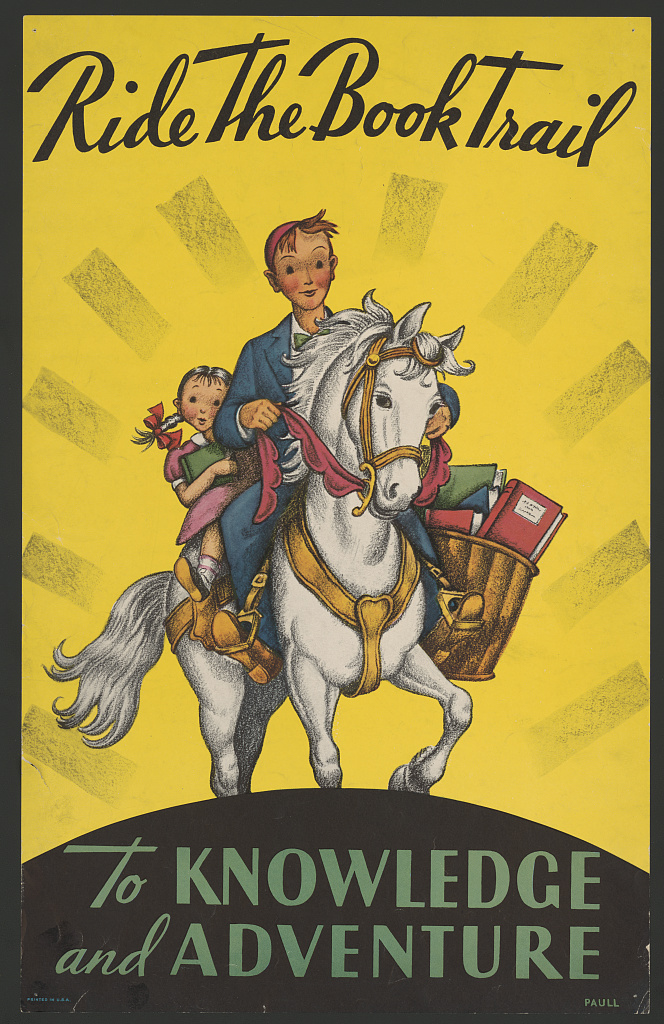
Grace Paull poster, c. 1934

Her work is included in the collections of the Munson-Williams-Proctor Arts Institute and the National Gallery of Art. Illustrations by Paull are included in the Grace Paull Collection at the University of Minnesota Libraries.

== Selected works ==
- Tops and Whistles (1927), illustrator
- Children of the Handicrafts (1935), illustrator
- Little Girl with Seven Names (1936), illustrator
- Benjie's Hat (1938, illustrator
- Dancing Tom by Elizabeth Coatsworth (1938), illustrator
- Homespun Playdays (1941), illustrator
- Forgotten Island (1942), illustrator
- The Middle Sister by Miriam E. Mason (1947), illustrator
- Crazy Creek by Evelyn Sibley Lampman (1948), illustrator
- The Little Haymakers (1949), illustrator
- The Bounces of Cynthiann by Evelyn Sibley Lampman (1950), illustrator
- The Wonderful Baker (1950), illustrator
- Snowed-In Hill (1953), author and illustrator
- Come to the City (1959), author and illustrator
