= Buck Hill (disambiguation) =

Buck Hill is an elevation and ski hill in Burnsville, Minnesota, United States.

Buck Hill may also refer to:

== People ==
- Buck Hill (musician) (1927-2017), American jazz saxophonist

== Places ==
- Buck Hill (British Columbia), a hill in Canada
- Buck Hill, Wiltshire, a hamlet in Wiltshire, England
- Buck Hill (Herkimer County, New York), an elevation in the United States
- Buck Hill (Oneida County, New York), an elevation in the United States

== See also ==
- Buck Hill Farm Covered Bridge, bridge in Lancaster County, Pennsylvania, United States
- Buck Hill Falls, Pennsylvania, private resort community in the United States
- Buckhill Colliery Halt railway station, a former railway station in Cumbria, England
