= Northeast Children's Literature Collection =

The Northeast Children's Literature Collection (NCLC) is housed at Archives & Special Collections at the University of Connecticut. The purpose of the Northeast Children’s Literature Collection is to preserve the history of the creation of our best literature written for children. Emphasis is given to the perception of children’s literature as a form of art over other educational or social intentions. Archives are collected to document the process of children’s book creation by authors and illustrators in collaboration with agents, editors, designers and publishers.

== Beginnings of the NCLC ==
The Special Collections Department was created in 1965 to house, organize, protect, and service the increasing numbers of rare, valuable, and fragile items owned by the library, including numerous research collections maintained as separate units. At this time, children’s books represented a small research collection of about 1,000 titles of the period 1840–1920 with emphasis on 1860–1900, a period that had been overlooked by other regional collectors. Illustrated material was also of particular interest.

In 1989, Norman D. Stevens, Director of University Libraries, asked Roger Crossgrove, Emeritus Professor of Art at the University of Connecticut and Billie M. Levy to work with Richard Schimmelpfeng, Director for Special Collections, and Ellen Embardo, Special Collections Librarian, to develop the Northeastern Children’s Literature Collections. With this initiative, the staff began to collect the archives of artists and writers as well, to insure the preservation of every aspect of children’s book production – from the initial correspondence to preliminary drawings, finished art, dummies, mechanicals, proofs, galleys and manuscripts.

== Francelia Butler ==
Children's literature was a hot topic on campus in the 1970s and 1980s, with the leaders of the field like Francelia Butler, teaching, publishing, leading conferences and later the Peace Games; in effect helping to bring the study of children's literature into the mainstream of scholarship. The NCLC holds the papers of Dr. Butler and the large number of audiovisual materials created in her classroom. Many of the greatest names in children's literature, including Maurice Sendak and Big Bird, visited the popular Butler “kiddie lit” classes.

== Special collections ==
Archives & Special Collections develops a core collection of award-winning children’s books by participating in a children’s awards acquisition plan. The plan encompasses standard prizes such as the Newbery and Caldecott medals, a large number of multi-cultural awards such as the Coretta Scott King and Tomás Rivera awards, and international awards from Australia, Canada, England, Ireland, and New Zealand. Published works in English by authors and illustrators whose archives are held are added comprehensively.

== Manuscript collections ==
Archives & Special Collections holds over 120 archives of notable authors and illustrators of children’s literature native to or identified with the Northeast and East Coast of the United States. Significant holdings include the archives of Natalie Babbitt, Barbara Cooney, Tomie dePaola, Leonard Everett Fisher, Ruth Krauss, James Marshall, Richard Scarry, Marc Simont, Esphyr Slobodkina, Joseph A. Smith, Cyndy Szekeres, Leonard Weisgard, Hans Wilhelm, and Ed Young among others.

== Collection development ==
The Northeast Children's Literature Collection's general guidelines for book acquisitions are to collect historical and contemporary books written or illustrated by individuals with manuscript collections in the NCLC; those authored or illustrated by individuals associated with the Northeast or the Eastern Seaboard; those by authors and illustrators recognized as important to the genre; those representing publishing or artistic phenomena such as artists’ books. The NCLC also adds works that complement existing holdings and contemporary books that have won major national or international awards in approximately 60 categories such as the:

- Newbery Medal
- Caldecott Medal
- Boston Globe–Horn Book Award
- Pura Belpré Award
- Scott O'Dell Award for Historical Fiction
- Golden Kite Award
- Phoenix
