= Nina Rosenblum =

American documentary film and television producer and director

Nina Rosenblum (born September 20, 1950) is an American documentary filmmaker and television producer. A director and member of the Academy of Motion Picture Arts and Sciences and the Directors Guild of America, she co-founded Daedalus Productions, Inc. with Daniel Allentuck.

== Early life and education ==
The daughter of photographer Walter Rosenblum and photographic historian Naomi Rosenblum, Nina Rosenblum attended the Music and Art High School in New York and studied at the Philadelphia School of the Arts and Yale Summer School for the Arts. She earned a Bachelor of Fine Arts degree from Cooper Union, a Master of Fine Arts degree from Queens College, and received a Mellon Foundation Grant to attend NYU's Graduate Film School.

== Career ==
The 1984 documentary America and Lewis Hine about Lewis Hine was inspired by her parents' exhibition and book about the man they called "America's greatest photographer". In the film, Jason Robards is the voice of Hine, the pioneer photographer who documented child labor and the building of America from 1900 to 1940. It premiered at the New York Film Festival and was broadcast nationally on PBS. At the 1985 Sundance Film Festival, it won the Special Jury Prize: Documentary.

Narrated by Susan Sarandon, Through the Wire (1990) investigates a high-security unit at a federal women's prison in Lexington, Kentucky, and the international movement to shut it down. Produced in association with Amnesty International, the film premiered at the 1990 Berlin Film Festival and won Best Documentary at the 1990 Munich Film Festival. It was broadcast on PBS' POV series.

Lock-Up: The Prisoners of Riker Island (1992) is a feature documentary was produced for HBO's America Undercover series.

Rosenblum was nominated for an Academy Award for the Denzel Washington and Louis Gossett Jr. narrated 1992 PBS documentary, Liberators: Fighting on Two Fronts in World War II. It reflects on the Black 761st Tank Battalion, highlighting the racism they endured at home while fighting to free Nazi victims abroad. Questions have been raised as to the factual nature of this documentary and whether any Black soldier regiments were involved with the initial liberation of concentration camps in Germany.

The Untold West: The Black West (1994), narrated by Danny Glover, aired on TBS. It is a tribute to the contributions of Black cowboys to the settlement of the American West. Weaving documentary and dramatic segments, it won an Emmy Award for Best Screenwriting and was nominated for a CableACE award.

Rosenblum produced and directed Walter Rosenblum: In Search of Pitt Street that chronicled the photographic career of her father, Walter Rosenblum. Rosenblum was a highly decorated U.S. Army Signal Corps cameraman who documented the D-Day landing on Omaha Beach and the liberation of the concentration camp at Dachau. The film premiered at the D-Day Museum in New Orleans and has been screened at film festivals and broadcast internationally, winning numerous awards.

They Fight with Cameras (2025), was produced and directed with Daniel Allentuck and narrated by Liev Schreiber. It recounts the World War II experiences of Rosenblum's father, Walter Rosenblum, a U.S. Army Signal Corps combat cameraman. Combining his wartime photographs, previously unseen motion picture footage, and recently discovered personal letters to his first wife, They Fight with Cameras traces Rosenblum's path from the D‑Day landings on Omaha Beach to the liberation of Dachau. The film has won numerous awards on the international festival circuit, including Best Feature Documentary at the Cannes World Film Festival and Best Documentary at the Paris Film Awards, as well as the documentary feature award at the 2025 Santa Barbara Indie Film Festival.

=== Other credits ===
- Sly and Jimi: The Skin I'm In (2000), a Showtime/NYT television documentary, about the music of Jimi Hendrix and Sly and the Family Stone. (Producer/Director)
- Twin Lenses (2000), a film about twin fashion photographers Frances McLaughlin-Gill and Kathryn Abbe.
- Unintended Consequences (2000), a short about the "Mothers of the NY Disappeared" who protest the Rockefeller Mandatory Minimum Drug Laws
- Code Yellow: Hospital at Ground Zero, which documents the response of the NYU Downtown Hospital to 9/11 (Producer/Director)
- Zahira's Peace (2004), a feature documentary in co-production with Sogecable, Spain, which was broadcast on the first anniversary of the March 11th bombing on Canal+ Spain.
- In the Name of Democracy, filmed by Haskell Wexler, the story of Lt. Ehren Watada, the first officer to refuse deployment to Iraq and who won his case.
- Ordinary Miracles: The Photo League's New York (2013), the story of the NY Photo League, which has been screened at festivals and educational institutions internationally. (Producer)
- PBS series, The African Americans: Many Rivers to Cross (2013), credited on episode 6 for providing the story of Terrence Stevens.

Additional credits include Slaveship: The Testimony of The Henrietta Marie (1995) and A History of Women Photographers (1997), narrated by Maureen Stapleton. These shorts were included in traveling exhibitions across the United States.

Rosenblum is president of Daedalus Productions, which she co-founded with Dan Allentuck in 1980 to produce documentary films about issues not covered in the conventional media.

=== Recognition ===
In 1994, she received the Washington, D.C. Women of Vision Award celebrating women's creative and technical achievements in media.

In 2011, Casa del Cinema in Rome, Italy co-sponsored by Fotoleggendo and ISFCI and the Villa Pignatelli in Naples, Italy held festivals of seven films produced by Daedalus Productions in honor of Rosenblum's contribution to cinema.

== Filmography ==
- 1984: America and Lewis Hine (documentary)
- 1990: Through the Wire (documentary)
- 1992: Liberators: Fighting on Two Fronts in World War II (documentary)
- 1992: Lock-Up: The Prisoners of Riker Island (documentary)
- 1994: The Untold West: The Black West
- 1995: Slaveship: The Testimony of The Henrietta Marie (short)
- 1997: A History of Women Photographers (short)
- 1999: Walter Rosenblum: In Search of Pitt Street (documentary)
- 2000: Sly and Jimi: The Skin I'm In (documentary)
- 2000: Twin Lenses
- 2000: Unintended Consequences (short)
- 2002: Code Yellow: Hospital at Ground Zero
- 2004: Zahira's Peace (documentary)
- 2009: In the Name of Democracy
- 2013: Ordinary Miracles: The Photo League's New York (documentary)
- 2025: They Fight with Cameras (documentary; narrated by Liev Schreiber, score by Marcus Loeber)
