= Cold Brook (West Canada Creek tributary) =

Location
- Country: United States
- State: New York

Physical characteristics
- Mouth: West Canada Creek
  - location: Poland, New York
  - coordinates: 43°13′26″N 75°03′47″W
  - elevation: 679 ft (207 m)

Cold Brook flows into West Canada Creek in Poland, New York, in Herkimer County. Cold Brook flows through the Village of Cold Brook.
