= 26 Fairmount Avenue =

Book by Tomie dePaola

- Author: Tomie dePaola
- Language: English
- Genre: Children's literature
- Published: April 5, 1999 (Putnam)
- Publication place: United States
- Media type: Print (paperback)
- Pages: 64 p
- ISBN: 0-399-23246-X
- OCLC: 38550527
- Dewey Decimal: 813/.54 B 21
- LC Class: PS3554.E11474 Z473 1999

26 Fairmount Avenue (ISBN 0-399-23246-X) is a 1999 children's novel by Tomie dePaola. The book won a Newbery Honor in 2000, and was named a Notable Children's Book on the Association for Library Service to Children's annual list that year.

== Plot ==
The book deals with the early life of Tomie dePaola. He has just moved to a new house in Connecticut and the 1938 hurricane has just hit. Tomie expresses unhappiness for seeing Snow White and the Seven Dwarfs in the theatres.

== Continuity ==
Characters such as Nana Upstairs and Nana Downstairs, introduced in other dePaola books, are present in this book.

== Other books in this series ==
- Here We All Are
- On My Way.
- What a Year!
- Things Will Never be the Same (The War Years)
- I'm Still Scared (The War Years)
- Why? (The War Years)
- For the Duration (The War Years)

== See also ==
- Nana Upstairs & Nana Downstairs
