= Dave Heath =

American photographer

David Martin Heath
- Born: June 27, 1931; Philadelphia, Pennsylvania, U.S.
- Died: June 27, 2016 (aged 85)
- Education: Philadelphia College of Art (1954–1955); Chicago Institute of Design (1955–1956); The New School for Social Research (1959)
- Occupation: Photographer
- Years active: 1947–2016
- Known for: A Dialogue with Solitude (1965)

David Martin Heath (June 27, 1931 – June 27, 2016) was an American documentary, humanist and street photographer.

Heath's books include A Dialogue with Solitude (1965). In 2015, a retrospective of his work was hosted by Philadelphia Museum of Art. His work is held in the collections of the J. Paul Getty Museum, Metropolitan Museum of Art, Museum of Fine Arts, Houston, and Museum of Modern Art.

== Life and work ==
Heath was born in Philadelphia. He was inspired by Life magazine, most notably the article "Bad Boy's Story: An Unhappy Child Learns to Live at Peace with the World" by Life photographer Ralph Crane in 1947, and the 1946 book Photography is a Language by John R. Whiting. He was a mostly self-taught photographer.

He was drafted in 1952 and served in Korea, taking many photographs there.

On his return, he attended Philadelphia Museum College, followed by Philadelphia College of Art during the 1954 to 1955. He moved to Chicago to study at the Chicago Institute of Design in the 1955 to 1956 school year.

In 1959, he attended The New School for Social Research in New York City, where he settled. In the late 1950s, he made street photographs of people in Washington Square Park in New York City, later collected in the book Washington Square (2016).

He emigrated to Toronto in 1970.

== Publications ==
=== Books by Heath ===
- A Dialogue with Solitude. New York: Community; Horizon, 1965. With an introduction by Hugh Edwards and a "letter" by Robert Frank. Edition of 1400 copies.
  - Reprinted edition. Toronto: Lumiere, 2000. ISBN 978-0-921542-11-7.
- Korea Photographs 1953–1954. Toronto: Lumiere, 2004. ISBN 978-0-921542-13-1.
- David Heath's Art Show. Toronto: Anonymous, 2007. ISBN 978-1-4276-0826-0. Edition of 1300 copies.
- Multitude, Solitude: The Photographs of Dave Heath. New Haven, CT: Yale University Press, 2015. By Keith F. Davis. ISBN 978-0-300-20825-2. With contributions by Michael Torosian and a director's foreword by Julián Zugazagoitia.
- Washington Square. Stanley/Barker, 2016. ISBN 978-0-9955555-2-5. Includes an excerpt from "Howl" by Allen Ginsberg as an introduction. Edition of 1000 copies.
- Dialogues with Solitudes. Göttingen, Germany: Steidl; Paris: Le Bal, 2018. ISBN 978-3-95829-543-8.
- One Brief Moment. Stanley/Barker, 2022. ISBN 978-1-913288-48-8.

=== Hand made artist books by Heath ===
- 3. 1952.
- No Dancing in the Streets. 1954.
- Chicago. 1956.
- In Search of Self: A Portfolio. 1956.

=== Publications with contributions by Heath ===
- Ryerson: A Community of Photographers. Toronto: Ryerson Community, 1974.

== Exhibitions ==
=== Solo exhibitions ===
- Seven Arts Coffee Gallery, New York City, 1958.
- Multitude, Solitude: The Photographs of Dave Heath, Philadelphia Museum of Art, 2015; Nelson-Atkins Museum of Art, Kansas City, MO, November 2016 – March 2017. A retrospective.
- Dave Heath: Dialogues with Solitudes, Le Bal, Paris, September–December 2018; The Photographers' Gallery, London, March–June 2019.

=== Group exhibitions ===
- Museum of Modern Art, New York, November 1959

== Collections ==
Heath's work is held in the following permanent collections:

- J. Paul Getty Museum, Los Angeles, CA: 4 prints (as of March 2019)
- Metropolitan Museum of Art, New York: 15 prints (as of March 2019)
- Museum of Fine Arts, Houston, Houston, TX: 33 prints (as of March 2019)
- Museum of Modern Art, New York: 14 prints (as of March 2019)
- Smart Museum of Art, University of Chicago, Chicago, IL: 3 prints (as of March 2019)
