= Upstairs Downstairs =

Upstairs Downstairs may refer to:

== Television ==
- Upstairs, Downstairs (1971 TV series), a British TV series broadcast on ITV from 1971 to 1975
- Upstairs Downstairs (2010 TV series), a sequel of the ITV series broadcast on the BBC from 2010
- "Upstairs/Downstairs" (Daredevil)

== Music ==
- Upstairs/Downstairs, a 2007 album by The Ergs!
- Upstairs Downstairs, a 2000 live album by Radio Massacre International
- "Upstairs Downstairs", a 1971 TV series theme song issued as a single by Mantovani 1973
- "Upstairs, Downstairs", a song by Herman's Hermits from the 1967 album Blaze

== Other uses ==
- "Upstairs Downstairs", a maze game for the Unisys ICON

== See also ==
- Royal Upstairs Downstairs, a 2011 British teledocumentary
- Upstairs and Downstairs, a 1959 British film starring Claudia Cardinale
- Upstairs and Downstairs (1925 film), a German film
- Nana Upstairs & Nana Downstairs, a 1973 book by Tomie dePaola
- Upstairs at the Downstairs, a former nightclub and theatre in New York City
