= Hauman =

Hauman is a surname. Notable people with the surname include:

- Constance Hauman (born 1961), American soprano
- George and Doris Hauman, American illustrators of children's books
- Glenn Hauman (born 1969), American writer, editor, publisher and comic book colorist
- Lucien Leon Hauman (1880–1965), Belgian botanist and an author
