= Sand Hill (Herkimer County, New York) =

Mountain in New York, United States

- Location within New York Location within the United States

Highest point
- Elevation: 1,542 feet (470 m)
- Coordinates: 43°15′31″N 75°00′53″W

Geography
- Location: ENE of Poland, New York, U.S.
- Topo map: USGS Hinckley

Sand Hill is a summit located in Central New York Region of New York located in the Town of Russia in Herkimer County, east-northeast of Poland.
