= Dallas High School =

Dallas High School may refer to:

- Dallas High School (Dallas, Pennsylvania)
- Dallas High School (Oregon)
- Dallas High School (Texas)
- North Dallas High School in Dallas, Texas
