= Naomi Rosenblum =

American photography historian (1925–2021)

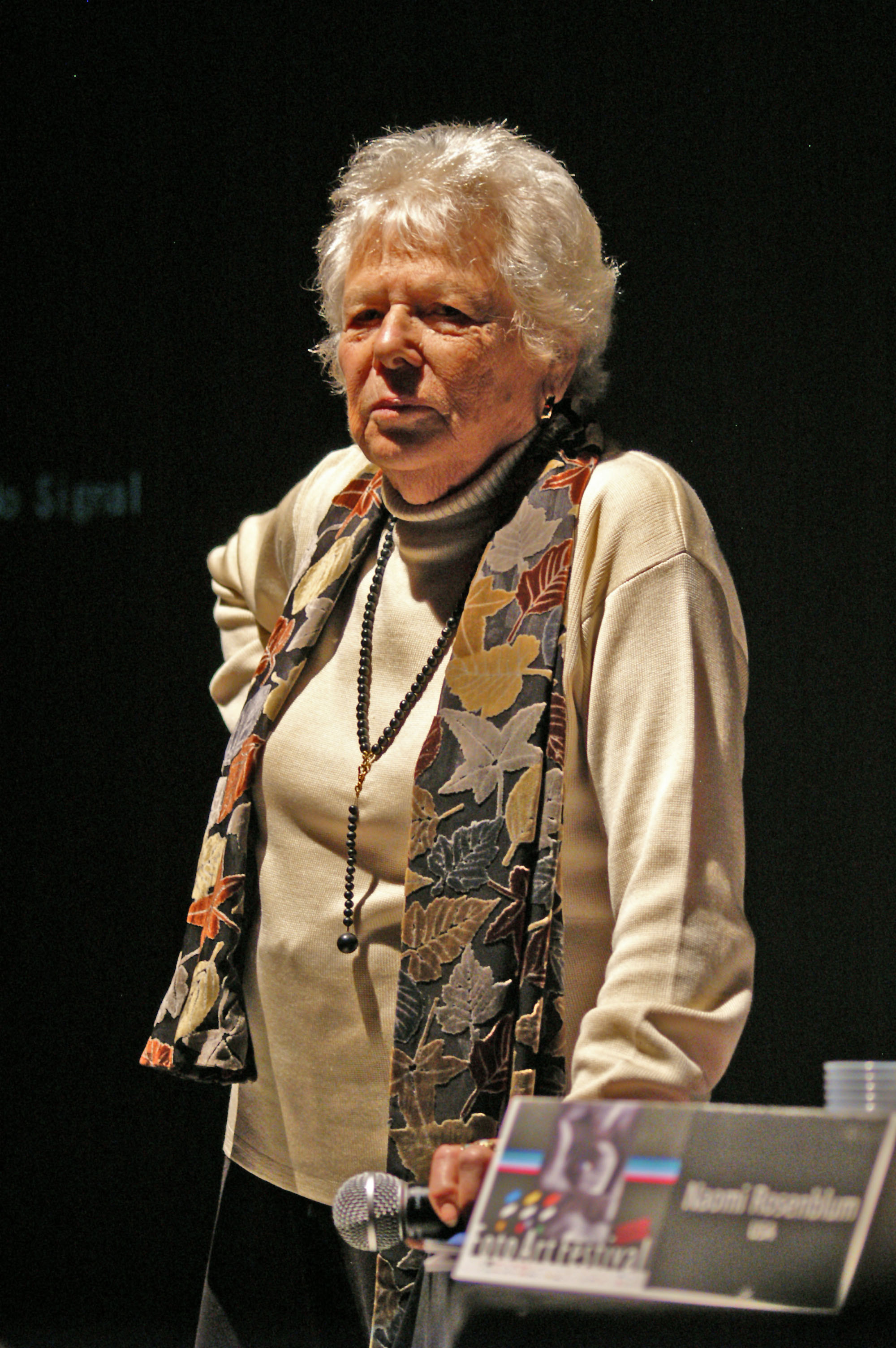
Rosenblum during FotoArtFestival 2007 in Poland. Photo by Piotr Bieniecki

Naomi Rosenblum, PhD, (January 26, 1925 – February 19, 2021) was an American historian of photography. She was the author of A World History of Photography (1984) and A History of Women Photographers (1994), and wrote widely on photography. Her work helped bring greater recognition to photography as a creative and scholarly field.

== Career ==
Rosenblum's major work, A World History of Photography, was first published by Abbeyville Press in 1984 and has since been translated into French, Japanese, Polish, and Chinese. The book has become a standard reference in the field and is used by practitioners, critics, and historians of photography. It was also a finalist for the Kraszna-Krausz Book Award, which recognizes outstanding work in photography and moving image publishing.

While researching photographers for A World History of Photography, Rosenblum noticed that women photographers were often relegated to the back pages of magazines. She later explained in an interview for Exposure: "I would make a little card and just file it away because I knew I couldn't get them all into the World History." In 1990, Rosenblum was named a Getty scholar in residence in Los Angeles, where she received a fellowship to research women's contributions to photography. This work culminated in her second influential book, A History of Women Photographers, published in 1994.

In addition to these notable publications, she also wrote about photographers including Adolphe Braun, Lewis Hine, and Paul Strand.

She also curated and co-curated several photography exhibitions and contributed to exhibition catalogs that helped contextualize the work of photographers for both scholarly and public audiences.

Rosenblum taught the history of photography at several New York schools, including Brooklyn College, New York University’s Tisch School of the Arts, the Parsons School of Design, and the CUNY Graduate Center. She also lectured internationally throughout her career.

Rosenblum's work is archived at the Center for Creative Photography at the University of Arizona in Tucson, Arizona.

=== Select publications ===
- America and Lewis Hine: Photographs 1904 to 1940, Aperture, 1977. ISBN 9780893810085
- A World History of Photography, Abbeville Press, 1984. ISBN 978-0896594388
- Changing Chicago: A Photodocumentary (Visions of Illinois), with Larry Heinemann, University of Illinois Press, 1989. ISBN 978-0252016417
- Orgeval: A Remembrance of Paul Strand, Lumiere Press,1990. ISBN 9780921542056
- Seeing Straight: The F.64 Revolution in Photography, edited by Therese Thau Heyman, University of Washington Press/Oakland Museum, 1992. ISBN 978-0295972190
- A History of Women Photographers, Abbeville Press, 1994. ISBN 978-0789213440
- Photo League: New York 1936–1951. Catalog of an exhibition curated by Enrica Vigano; texts by Naomi Rosenblum and Enrica Vigano. Trieste: Il Ramo d’Oro Ed., 2001.
- Strand + Rosenblum: Corrispondenze Elettive/Enduring Friendship, foreword by Rosenblum, Admira Edizioni, Milan, Italy, 2011. ISBN 9788889163078
- Paul Strand: The Stieglitz Years at 291 (1915–1917), with Paul Strand, New York: Zabriskie, 1983

=== Select exhibitions ===
- Lewis Hine: A Retrospective, co-curated with Walter Rosenblum and Barbara Millstein, Brooklyn Museum, 1977.
- Lewis Hine: A Retrospective, National Art Museum of China, Beijing, 1980. First official loan from an American museum to China.
- Women Photographers: A Historical Survey, organized by Rosenblum, New York Public Library, 1996. One of the first large-scale exhibitions to survey women’s photography as fine art.
- A History of Women Photographers, curated by Rosenblum, 1997. Traveling exhibition.
- Documenting a Myth: The South as Seen by Three Women Photographers, curated by Rosenblum and Susan Fillin-Yeh, Douglas F. Cooley Memorial Art Gallery, Reed College, 1997.
- Photo League: New York 1936–1951, curated by Rosenblum. Traveling exhibition focused on the League’s role in American documentary photography, 2001.

== Personal life ==
Rosenblum earned a Bachelor of Arts in fine arts from Brooklyn College in 1948, where she met Walter Rosenblum, a professor and decorated WWII US Army Signal Corps cameraman. They married in 1949 and had two daughters: Lisa, a former executive in the communications industry, and Nina, a documentary filmmaker.

She later earned a master’s degree in fine arts (1975) and a PhD in art history and the history of photography (1978) from the CUNY Graduate Center; her dissertation focused on the early work of photographer Paul Strand. Naomi and Walter were part of New York’s photography scene and active in the Photo League, a cooperative that promoted socially conscious photography. The couple also collaborated on exhibitions, including a major retrospective of Lewis Hine that opened at the Brooklyn Museum and traveled internationally.

== Awards and honors ==
- International Center of Photography's Lifetime Achievement Award: Presented to Naomi and Walter Rosenblum
- Kraszna-Krausz Book Award: Finalist
- Aperture Foundation Gala: Honoree
