= Frances McLaughlin-Gill =

American photographer

- Born: Frances McLaughlin; September 22, 1919; Brooklyn, New York City, U.S.
- Died: October 23, 2014 (aged 95)
- Other names: Franny McLaughlin
- Occupation: Photographer
- Years active: 1941–2011
- Known for: First female photographer of Vogue
- Relatives: Kathryn Abbe; (twin sister); Tomie dePaola (cousin)

Frances McLaughlin-Gill (1919–2014) was an American photographer and the first female fashion photographer under contract with Vogue. After two decades in the fashion industry, she worked as an independent film producer for a decade making commercials and films. One of her films won the Gold Medal at the 1969 International Films and TV Festival of New York. In her later career, she published several collections both with her sister and in collaboration with other authors.

== Early life ==
Frances McLaughlin was born on September 22, 1919, in Brooklyn, New York to Kathryn and Frank McLaughlin. She was the twin sister of Kathryn Abbe. Her father died when the twins were three months old and the family relocated to Wallingford, Connecticut, where they completed their schooling. Frances graduated from Lyman Hall High School as the class valedictorian and Kathryn was salutatorian in 1937. The twins then enrolled in Pratt Institute to study photography, graduating in 1941. That same year, both entered the Prix de Paris contest sponsored by Vogue and were among the five finalists.

== Career ==
McLaughlin began working as a stylist at Montgomery Ward and as a photography assistant until 1943. That year, photographer Toni Frissell introduced her to Alexander Liberman, Vogue′s art director, who signed McLaughlin under contract, becoming their first contracted female fashion photographer. Liberman thought McLaughlin had a fresh approach. To him, her directness and spontaneity made McLaughlin an ideal photographer, because her images were less posed and more natural than many fashion photographers working at that time. She began on shoots with junior models working for Vogue′s Glamour Magazine which was aimed at younger viewers and was able to capture movement in ways that had not been done before. Throughout the 1940s and 1950s, McLaughlin produced some of the strongest images that appeared in the American edition of Vogue. In addition to fashion photographs, her images included celebrity photos, as well as still lifes for editorials and covers of House & Garden. In 1948, she married the photographer Leslie Gill, who was known as one of the first photographers to use color film.

One of the high points of her career, was McLaughlin's work at the 1952 Paris Fashion Week. In 1954, though she continued working for Glamour, House & Garden and Vogue, McLaughlin became a freelance photographer with Condé Nast Publications. She was a regular contributor to British Vogue throughout the Sixties. Gill died suddenly in 1958, and it was after his death, that McLaughlin began hyphenating her surname. The following year, the sisters worked together on a collection of children's photographs that were featured in Modern Photography. Between 1964 and 1973, McLaughlin-Gill made television commercials and films as an independent film producer and director. Her film Cover Girl: New Face in Focus, about Model of the Year, Elaine Fulkerson’s journey to become a fashion model, won the Gold Medal at the 1969 International Films and TV Festival of New York. Then in the late 1970s, she began teaching photography seminars at Manhattan's School of Visual Arts.

McLaughlin-Gill began publishing some of her later works in book form after 1976. Some of her best known collections were Women Photograph Men published in 1976 and Twins on Twins which was published in 1981 with her twin sister, Kathryn Abbe. She also made photographs for several author's books, including a book about body language, Face Talk, Hand Talk, Body Talk (1977) by Sue Castle and Jane Fearer Safer's Spirals From the Sea: An Anthropological Look at Shells (1983). In 1984, she prepared photographs for a retrospective exhibit of her husband's works for the New Orleans Museum of Art. In 1995, an exhibit of her photographs was held at Hamilton's Gallery in London and in 2011, she and her sister published their final book together, Twin Lives in Photography. The sisters were the subject of a 2009 documentary,Twin Lenses produced by Nina Rosenblum, which highlighted their pioneering roles in photography and included interviews with the twins. McLaughlin-Gill died on October 23, 2014.
