= John Lawson (children's author) =

American writer (1923–1993)

- Born: John Schults Lawson; August 1, 1923; New York City, U.S.
- Died: December 12, 1993 (aged 70)
- Education: Phillips Exeter Academy; Harvard College
- Occupation: Writer
- Spouse: Charlotte
- Children: 2
- Parent(s): John Lawson; Nancy Sommers Lawson
- Writing career
- Genre: Children's literature
- Notable awards: Boston Globe–Horn Book Award (1968)

John Shults "Jack" Lawson (August 1, 1923 – December 12, 1993) was an American writer of children's novels. He was born in New York City to John and Nancy Sommers Lawson. He graduated from Exeter and Harvard College. After serving in World War II he traveled through the mountains of Virginia, where he settled on a farm. He later worked in New York City, in the brokerage business, but continued to return regularly to the farm, where he and his wife, Charlotte, raised two daughters.

His first novel, You Better Come Home With Me, grew out of stories he told his daughters, Catherine and Elizabeth. It was illustrated by Arnold Spilka. His second novel, The Spring Rider, won the Boston Globe–Horn Book Award in 1968. Like his other books, The Spring Rider was based in the southern Appalachian Mountains where Lawson had made his home. Although all of his books contain some fantastical elements, The Spring Rider, has been recognized as an early example of a ghost story for children. His third novel, If Pigs Could Fly, was published in 1989. While The Spring Rider reflected realistic history of the Civil War, If Pigs Could Fly was a whimsical adventure of a young man in the Battle of New Orleans at the end of the War of 1812.

Both of his earlier books were included in the University of Chicago's guide to children's literature, The Best in Children's Books, where his writing was described as "often lyric, often ironic, always subtle ... always fanciful."

== Books ==
- You Better Come Home With Me (Crowell, 1966)
- The Spring Rider (Crowell, 1968)
- If Pigs Could Fly (Houghton Mifflin, 1989)
