= Russia Corners Historic District =

Historic district in New York, United States

- U.S. National Register of Historic Places
- U.S. Historic district
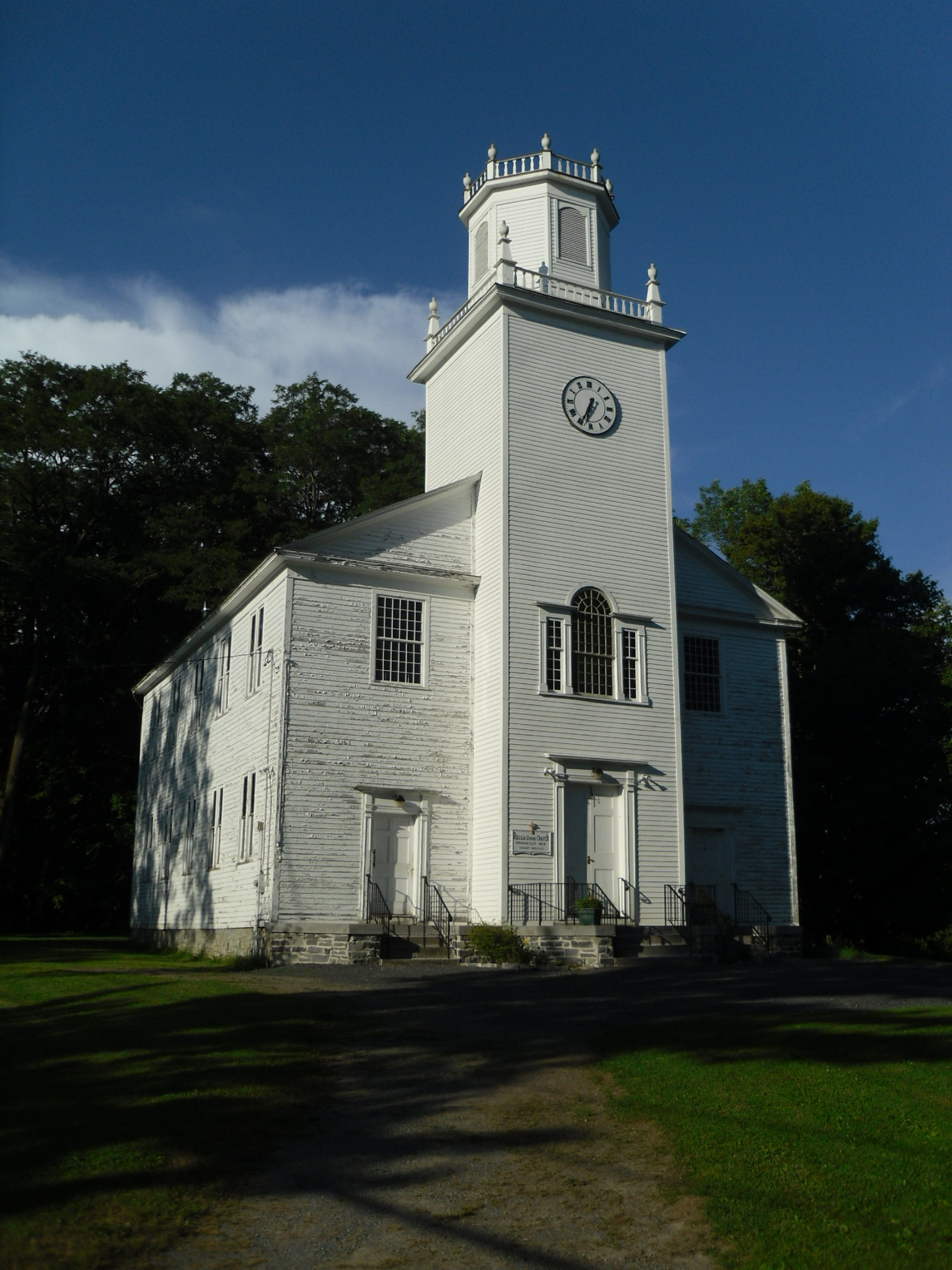
- Russia Union Church, July 2010

- Location within New York Location within the United States
- Location: Roughly, jct. of Military and Beecher Rds., hamlet of Russia, New York
- Coordinates: 43°15′27″N 75°4′48″W
- Area: 12.5 acres (5.1 ha)
- Architectural style: Federal, Greek Revival
- NRHP reference No.: 96000815
- Added to NRHP: July 25, 1996

Russia Corners Historic District is a national historic district located at the hamlet of Russia in Herkimer County, New York. The district includes six contributing buildings. They are the Russia Union Church (1820), Russia District School No. 5 (1816; modified in late 1880s), and four residences built between about 1803 and 1830.

It was listed on the National Register of Historic Places in 1996.

== Gallery ==
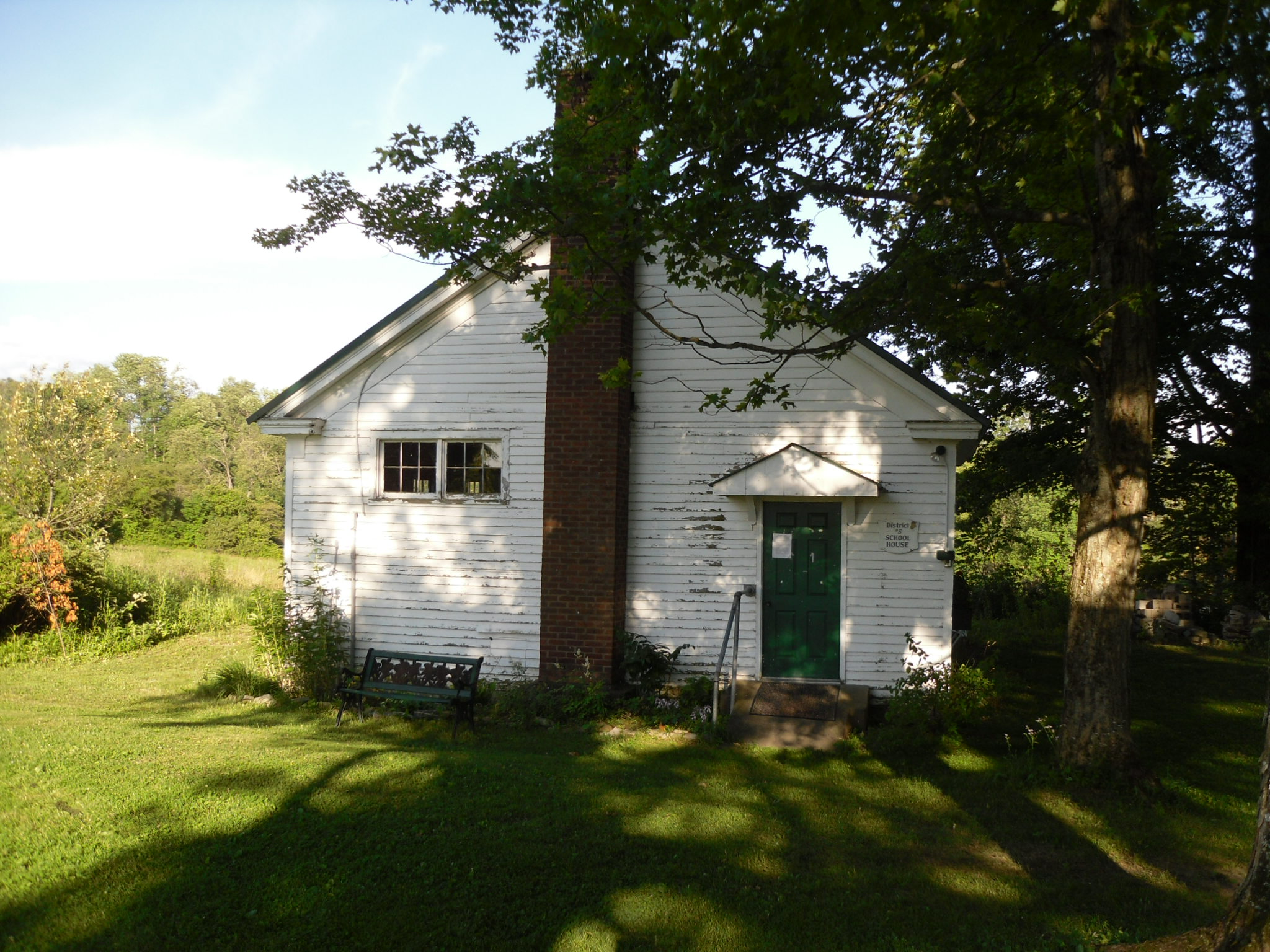
School House, July 2010
