= The Art Lesson =

Book by Tomie dePaola

- first edition
- Author: Tomie dePaola
- Cover artist: Tomie dePaola
- Language: English
- Genre: Children's Fiction
- Publisher: Trumpet Publishing
- Publication date: 1989
- Media type: Print

The Art Lesson is a 1989 children's picture book by Tomie dePaola. The book was published by Trumpet Publishing and deals with the theme of compromise. The Art Lesson was met with a positive reception by critics and was one of the New York Times's "Best Picture Books Of the Year for Children" in 1989.

== Synopsis ==
The semi-autobiographical book features the character of Tommy, an enthusiastic painter and drawer, making pictures for his relatives and friends and drawing on the sidewalk, on bedsheets, and even on walls. For his birthday, Tommy gets a box of 64 Crayola crayons, but his new first-grade teacher rejects them, and makes him draw the same thing as everybody else in his class, with a few school crayons and on a single sheet of paper. He makes a bargain with the school Art Teacher: one page for the drawing that the rest of his class is making, with school crayons, and the second for his own crayons and his own art.

== In popular culture ==
- The book was featured in an episode of Kino's Storytime.
- The book was also referenced in Tomie dePaola's appearance of the Barney & Friends episode, "Picture This!".
