= Miriam E. Mason =

American author of children's books

- Born: January 23, 1900; Goshen, Indiana
- Died: February 20, 1973 (aged 73); Batesville, Indiana
- Education: Indiana University, University of Missouri, and Ball State University
- Occupation: Children's book author

Miriam Evangeline Mason (1900 – 1973) was an American writer best known for her books for children.

== Biography ==
Mason was born on January 23, 1900, in Goshen, Indiana. Her parents, Benjamin Franklin Mason and Laura Gessaman Mason, were farmers with a family of seven. Mason was Lutheran.

When she was a student, she lived in Martinsville, Indiana. She attended Martinsville High School, Indiana University, the University of Missouri, and Ball State University. She married M.M. Swain in 1924. They divorced. She had one daughter, Kathleen.

Mason taught for several years and also worked in advertising and publishing.

Her books were published under her maiden name of Miriam E. Mason. Six of her books received starred reviews from Kirkus Reviews: Matilda and Her Family; The Middle Sister; A Lion for Patsy; Caroline and Her Kettle Named Maud; A Small Farm for Andy; and Becky and Her Brave Cat, Bluegrass. In addition to her books for children, she wrote hundreds of articles, short stories, and plays.

She made appearances to speak to children and adults throughout her career as an author.

She died on February 20, 1973, in Batesville, Indiana, at her home. She had lived in Batesville since the early 1940s.

Her papers are held at Indiana State University.

== Selected works ==
=== Children's books ===
- The Little Story House. Illustrated by Elfreda Burns. Beckley-Cardy, 1935.
- Smiling Hill Farm. Illustrated by Kate Seredy. Junior Literary Guild and Ginn, 1937.
- O Happy Day! Illustrated by Mabel Woodbury. Frederick A. Stokes Company, 1939.
- Home is Fun. Photographs by J.C. Allen and son. Beckley-Cardy, 1939.
- Susannah, the Pioneer Cow. Illustrated by Maud and Miska Petersham. Macmillan, 1941.
- Matilda and Her Family. Illustrated by Meg Wohlberg. Macmillan, 1942.
- Timothy Has Ideas. Illustrated by Berta Hader and Elmer Hader. Macmillan, 1943.
- Little Jonathan. Illustrated by George and Doris Hauman. Macmillan, 1944.
- Happy Jack. Illustrated by George and Doris Hauman. Macmillan, 1945.
- The Middle Sister. Illustrated by Grace Paull. Macmillan, 1947.
- A Lion for Patsy. Illustrated by Vera Neville. McKay, 1947.
- Hoppity. Illustrated by Kurt Wiese. Macmillan, 1947.
- A Pony Called Lightning. Illustrated by Clarence William Anderson. Macmillan, 1948.
- A House for Ten. Illustrated by Kate Seredy. Ginn, 1949.
- This Is Our Valley. With Sister Marguerite McArdle. Illustrated by Charlotte Ware. Ginn, 1949.
- Herman, the Brave Pig. Illustrated by George and Doris Hauman. Macmillan, 1949.
- The Gray-Nosed Kitten. Illustrated by Marie C. Nichols. Houghton Mifflin, 1950.
- Hominy and His Blunt-nosed Arrow. Illustrated by George and Doris Hauman. Macmillan, 1950.
- Three Ships Came Sailing in: a Story of John Smith's Jamestown. Illustrated by Charles V. John. Bobbs-Merrill, 1950.
- Caroline and Her Kettle Named Maud. Illustrated by Kathleen Voute. Macmillan, 1951. Later edition illustrated by Joseph Escourido.
- Young Mr. Meeker and His Exciting Journey to Oregon. Illustrated by Sandra James. Bobbs-Merrill, 1952.
- Yours with Love, Kate. Illustrated by Barbara Cooney. Houghton Mifflin, 1952.
- Broomtail, Brother of Lightning. Illustrated by Barbara Cooney. Houghton Mifflin, 1952.
- The Major and His Camels. Illustrated by Zhenya Gay. Macmillan, 1953.
- The Sugarbush Family. Illustrated by Zhenya Gay. Macmillan, 1954.
- Miss Posy Longlegs. Illustrated by Maud and Miska Petersham. Macmillan, 1955.
- Benjamin Lucky. Illustrated by Vee Guthrie. Macmillan, 1956.
- Freddy. Illustrated by Vee Guthrie. Macmillan, 1957.
- Katie Kittenheart. Illustrated by Charles Geer. Macmillan, 1957.
- A Small Farm for Andy. Illustrated by Vee Guthrie. Macmillan, 1958.
- John Smith: Man of Adventure. Illustrated by Charles Freeman. Houghton Mifflin, 1958.
- Mr. Meadowlark. Illustrated by Marie C. Nichols. Hastings House, 1959.
- The Baby Jesus. Illustrated by Johannes Troyer. Macmillan, 1959.
- Becky and Her Brave Cat, Bluegrass. Illustrated by Robert MacLean. Macmillan, 1960.
- Miney and the Blessing. Illustrated by Dorothy Bayley Morse. Macmillan, 1961.
- Hoppity. [different edition] Illustrated by Cyndy Szekeres. Macmillan, 1962.
- Stevie and His Seven Orphans. Illustrated by John Gretzer. Houghton Mifflin, 1964.
- Scared Kitten. Illustrated by Adrina Zanazanian. Macmillan, 1967.
- Caroline and the Seven Little Words. Illustrated by Paul Frame. Macmillan, 1967.
- Sara and the Winter Gift. Illustrated by Paul Frame. Macmillan, 1968.

=== Childhood of Famous Americans series ===
- Dan Beard, Boy Scout. Illustrated by Paul Laune. Bobbs-Merrill, 1953.
- Daniel Boone: Wilderness Trailblazer. Illustrated by Harve Stein. Houghton Mifflin, 1961.
- Frances Willard, Girl Crusader. Illustrated by Leslie Goldstein. Bobbs-Merrill, 1961.
- John Audubon, Young Naturalist. Also published with the title Young Audubon, Boy Naturalist. Illustrated by Cathy Morrison. Bobbs-Merrill, 1943. Patria Press, 2006.
- Kate Douglas Wiggin, the Little Schoolteacher. Illustrated by Vance Locke. Bobbs-Merrill, 1958.
- Mark Twain, Boy of Old Missouri. Illustrated by Henry S. Gillette. Bobbs-Merrill, 1962.
- Mary Mapes Dodge, Jolly Girl. Illustrated by Sandra James. Bobbs-Merrill, 1962.
- William Penn, Friendly Boy. Illustrated by Lawrence Dresser. Bobbs-Merrill, 1962.

=== Magic Bridge Readers ===
- Crawford: And Other Stories Long and Short. Prentice-Hall, 1963.
- Little Bunny Little: And Other Stories You Can Read. Prentice-Hall, 1963.
- The Birthday Cake: And Other Stories to Enjoy. Prentice-Hall, 1963.
- The Pink Pig: And Other Stories For You. Prentice-Hall, 1964.

=== Other works ===
- The Third Little Stocking. 1931. [play]
- The King Eternal; an Easter Service of Readings and Songs. Eldridge Entertainment House, 1932. [play]
- "Jonathan's Lucky Money." Illustrated by George and Doris Hauman. In A, B, C, Go! A Completely New Selection of Outstanding Children's Stories and Poems Compiled for Enrichment Reading by a Distinguished Editorial Board of Children's Librarians. [Edited by] Rosemary E. Livsey. Crowell-Collier, 1962. [poem]
