= Cyndy Szekeres =

American children's book author and illustrator (1933–2024)

- Born: October 31, 1933; Bridgeport, Connecticut, U.S.
- Died: November 22, 2024 (aged 91); Maryville, Tennessee, U.S.
- Education: Pratt Institute
- Occupations: Children's book author and illustrator
- Writing career
- Language: English
- Years active: 1959–2024
- Genre: Children's literature
- Notable awards: AIGA Medal (1969)

Cyndy Szekeres (October 31, 1933 – November 22, 2024) was an American children's book author and illustrator who has produced more than 130 books in the tradition of Beatrix Potter and Garth Williams. Best known for her anthropomorphic animal illustrations, she won the 1969 AIGA Award for Moon Mouse.

== Biography ==
Szekeres was born in Bridgeport, Connecticut on October 31, 1933. Her parents were Stephen Paul, a toolmaker, and Anna (Ceplousky) Szekeres. Her father was a first-generation immigrant from Hungary, while her mother was a second-generation Lithuanian American. Szekeres grew up in the countryside of Fairfield County, where she developed a love of nature and began drawing in pencil at a very young age. Growing up in the later years of the Great Depression, she got her start drawing on brown paper bags. She drew inspiration from the work of N. C. Wyeth and Arthur Rackham.

Encouraged by her father, who had heard advertising was a remunerative career, Szekeres studied art at the Pratt Institute between 1951 and 1954, earning a certificate in 1954. Richard Lindner taught her, Richard Scarry mentored her, and Tomie dePaola and Arnold Lobel counted among her classmates. However, Szekeres never intended to become a commercial artist. Following graduation, she worked various odd jobs, painting and dressing mechanical mannequins for window displays, assisting an art director at True Confessions magazine, and illustrating children's fashion for Saks Fifth Avenue.

Szekeres married Pratt classmate Gennaro "Jerry" Prozzo (1929–2006), a painter and etcher to whom dePaola had introduced her, on September 20, 1958. They moved to Brooklyn Heights, New York, where Prozzo taught art in parochial schools while Szekeres became a homemaker. The couple had two sons, Marco and Christopher, and two grandchildren, Nina and Emmett. They moved from Brooklyn Heights to Putney, Vermont, in 1974. Prozzo served as art department chair at Windham College until the college closed in 1978. He subsequently taught at the Vermont College of Fine Arts and maintained a studio in the home he shared with Szekeres. Following Prozzo's death, Szekeres continued to live on her 11-acre family farm in the forests outside Putney.

While pregnant with her first son, Szekeres received her first commission in 1959 to illustrate Sam Vaughan's New Shoes, published in 1961. She illustrated Miriam E. Mason's book Hoppity (Macmillan, 1962). Long Ago (1977) was the first book she both wrote and illustrated. In 1981, she signed an exclusive contract with Western Publishing to illustrate dozens of Little Golden Books during the 1980s and 1990s. Starting in 2000, Szekeres has written and illustrated a series of preschool concept books featuring a very young mouse named Toby. Her books had sold more than 14 million copies by 1996.

Her papers are held in the Northeast Children's Literature Collection of the University of Connecticut Library's Archives and Special Collections.

Szekeres died in Maryville, Tennessee on November 22, 2024, at the age of 91.
