= Roger Crossgrove =

American artist and educator (1921–2016)

Roger Lynn Crossgrove
- Born: November 17, 1921; Farnam, Nebraska, US
- Died: December 14, 2016 (aged 94–95); Storrs, Connecticut, US
- Occupation: Professor of Art

Academic background
- Education: University of Illinois (MFA); University of Nebraska (BFA)

Academic work
- Discipline: Fine arts
- Sub-discipline: Painting, photography
- Institutions: University of Connecticut; Pratt Institute
- Notable students: Tomie dePaola
- Website: https://rogerlcrossgrove.com/

Roger Lynn Crossgrove (November 17, 1921 – December 14, 2016) was an American artist and educator who served as Professor of Art at the Pratt Institute and the University of Connecticut for a total of 35 years. He was best known for his monotype watercolors and photographs of the male nude.

== Early life and education ==
Crossgrove was born in 1921 in Farnam, Nebraska, to parents Lynn E. Crossgrove (1896–1978) and Iva E. Crossgrove (1893–1976). He had a sister, Ardyce J., and a brother, Dale Eugene. His father was a farmer, and his mother was a self-taught artist. Both were Nebraska natives.

During World War II, Crossgrove served in the United States Army. He was deployed to the 73rd Field Hospital on Leyte in the Philippines, serving from 1942 to 1946. He attained the rank of staff sergeant and received the Philippines Liberation Medal and the Bronze Star Medal.

After his military service, Crossgrove returned to Nebraska and attended college on the G.I. Bill. He received his Bachelor of Fine Arts degree from the University of Nebraska in 1949 and his Master of Fine Arts degree in 1951 from the University of Illinois at Urbana-Champaign.

He was a resident fellow at Yaddo in Saratoga Springs, New York, for several years beginning in 1957.

== Academic career ==
From 1953 to 1967, Crossgrove taught at the Pratt Institute's Art School and the Department of Graphic Art and Illustration in Brooklyn. He taught Tomie dePaola in 1953. The pair became lifelong friends. Robert Mapplethorpe, Ken Kerslake, and Michael Maslin also studied under him.

In 1968, Crossgrove moved to Storrs, Connecticut, to teach at the University of Connecticut, where he chaired the art department until he retired in 1988. Former students described him as patient, supportive, good-humored, and committed to imparting broad foundational knowledge to his pupils. UConn named him a Professor of Art Emeritus, and the School of Fine Arts honored him with a Lifetime Achievement Award in 2008.

Along with collector Billie M. Levy and library director Norman D. Stevens, Crossgrove was a driving force behind the Connecticut Children's Book Fair, held annually at UConn starting in 1992. Crossgrove was also a longtime supporter of the Northeast Children’s Literature Collection.

== Artistic work ==
In addition to teaching, Crossgrove had a national reputation as an artist. He lived and painted for two years in Mexico, in 1950 and 1965. He spent more than fifty years painting watercolor monotypes, three of which were featured in the Smithsonian Institution's New American Monotypes traveling exhibit, which toured the US in 1978. Starting in 1976, Crossgrove branched out into photography, focusing on the male nude and experimenting with timed-exposure light tracing, a technique also employed by Picasso, and which subsequently saw widespread adoption among photographic artists.

Crossgrove exhibited widely in group and solo shows. He exhibited at the Whitney Museum of American Art (1956), Artworks Gallery in Hartford (2006), the William Benton Museum of Art (2016), and the Slater Memorial Museum. He won an Emily Lowe Award, a National Arts Club Gold Medal, and awards from the American Water Color Society, the Butler Institute of American Art, and Audubon Artists. He was a member of the Connecticut Academy of Fine Arts and the Connecticut Water Color Society. He was deeply involved in the cultural life of Hartford and northeastern Connecticut, organizing regional exhibits and studio tours. The state's poet laureate, Marilyn Nelson, honored him with her 2002 poem “The Good Man."

In 2013, Crossgrove donated his papers to the Smithsonian Institution’s Archives of American Art. Having become interested in children’s book illustrations in the later stages of his career, he donated his collections of photographs, posters, and children's books to the Northeast Children’s Literature Collection, part of the Archives and Special Collections at the UConn Library.

== Personal life ==
Crossgrove married Wynona McDermand (1927–2010) in 1948. The couple had six children: Cory, Chris, Cathy, Carolyn, Camilla, and Carl. His wife and son Cory predeceased him.

Crossgrove died on December 14, 2016, at the age of 95 in Storrs, Connecticut.
