= Dallas School District (Oregon) =

School district in Oregon, United States

Address
- 111 SW Ash Street Dallas, Oregon, 97338; United States
- Coordinates: 44°55′02″N 123°19′01″W

District information
- Type: Public
- Grades: KG-12
- Superintendent: Steve Spencer
- NCES District ID: 4103860

Students and staff
- Students: 3,162
- Teachers: 161
- Student–teacher ratio: 20:1

Other information
- Website: dallas.k12.or.us

Dallas School District (Dallas SD 2) is a public school district in Dallas, Oregon. The district consists of eight schools that serve Dallas and surrounding areas.

== Locker Room Controversy ==
=== Background ===
In November 2015, Dallas High School installed a Student Safety Plan titled "Transgender Student Access to Locker Rooms"; a plan that was a response to a transgender student's request that he be allowed to use the restrooms and locker rooms that correspond to the gender he identifies as. The student requested permission to change with the other boys due to a PE class he was taking, and the difficulty and ostracization he felt for needing to walk a great distance to use the bathroom the school offered him to change in. This allegedly caused other students to feel "embarrassment, humiliation, anxiety, intimidation, fear, apprehension, and stress." for having to share a bathroom or locker room with a person who was assigned a different sex at birth. School Administration and PE teachers met with the other students in the PE class to discuss the policy being put in place and answer any question or concerns. Many students and parents understood the policy being put in place, but six parents called the school to raise concerns. School board meetings about the Student Safety Plan were held in the following months on December 4, 2015, January 19, 2016, and February 11, 2016. The district decided to proceed with the Safety Plan despite the concerned students and parents. Individual parents and groups such as Parents for Privacy and Parents' Rights in Education sued the Dallas School District and various other government departments and officials of Oregon in November 2017.

=== Court Case Outcome ===
On July 24, 2018, The United States District Court for the District of Oregon granted the defendants request to dismiss the case and found that the plaintiffs could not prove that the defendants were violating Title IX or The Fourteenth Amendment of the United States Constitution. The plaintiffs filed a motion for preliminary injunction but was denied as moot. After the case was dismissed by the United States District Court for the District of Oregon, the plaintiffs filed an appeal to the United States Court of Appeals for the Ninth Circuit who, on July 11, 2019, affirmed the judgement of the District Court. The Parents For Privacy and other groups tried to bring the case to the Supreme Court, but the Supreme Court declined their challenge.

== See also ==
- Dallas High School
