= Cold Brook, New York =

- Village
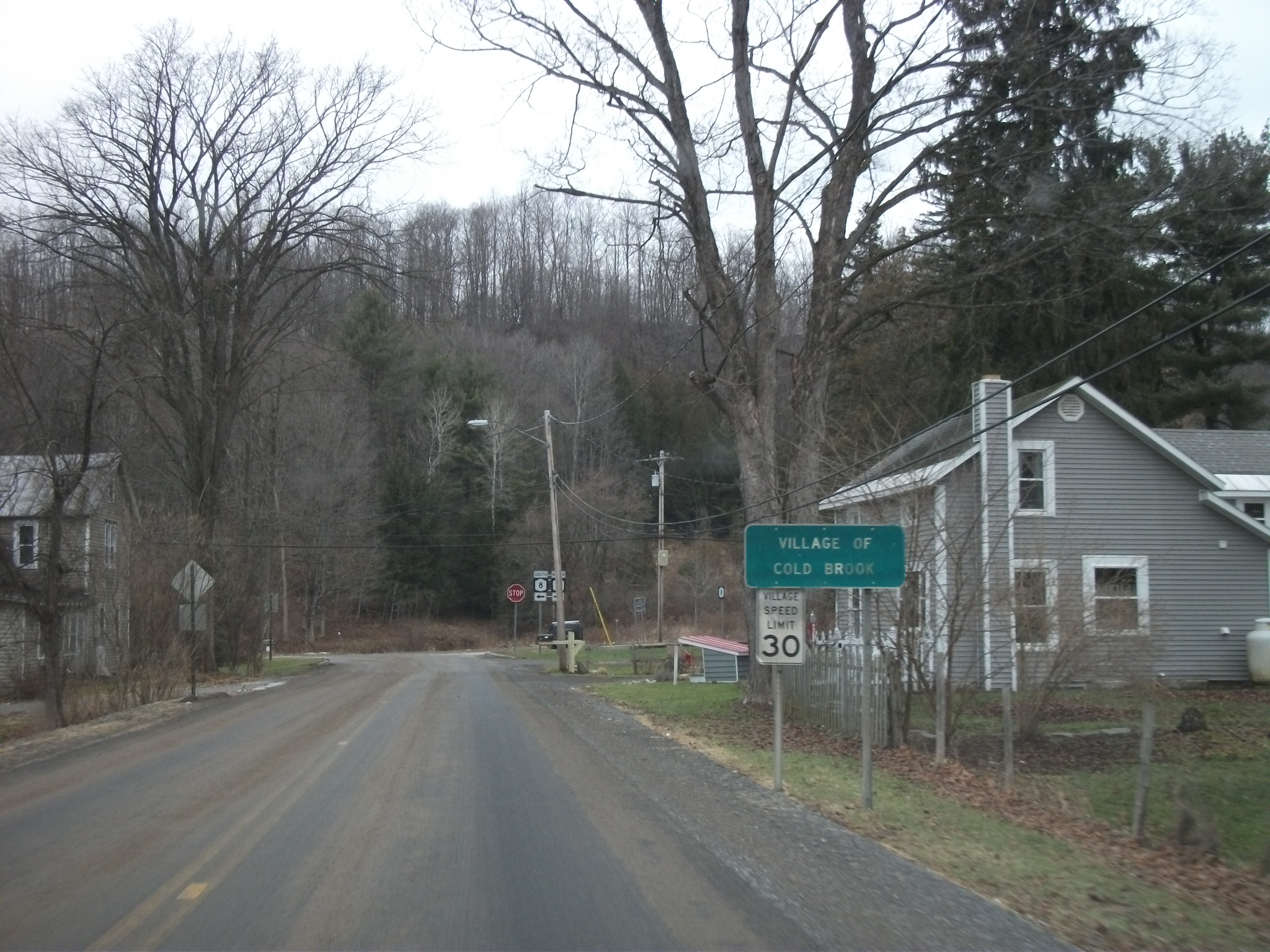
- Signage entering Cold Brook via Herkimer County Route 224, approaching New York State Route 8

- Location within New York Location within the United States
- Coordinates: 43°14′27″N 75°2′21″W
- Country: United States
- State: New York
- County: Herkimer
- Town: Russia

Area
  - Total: 0.44 sq mi (1.14 km^{2})
  - Land: 0.44 sq mi (1.14 km^{2})
  - Water: 0 sq mi (0.00 km^{2})
- Elevation: 945 ft (288 m)

Population (2020)
  - Total: 250
  - Density: 569.2/sq mi (219.78/km^{2})
- Time zone: UTC-5 (Eastern (EST))
  - Summer (DST): UTC-4 (EDT)
- ZIP code: 13324
- Area code: 315
- FIPS code: 36-16815
- GNIS feature ID: 0947025

Cold Brook is a village in Herkimer County, New York. As of the 2020 census, Cold Brook had a population of 250. It is named after a stream passing through the village. The village is located in the south part of the town of Russia and is northeast of Utica.

== History ==
The water power of Cold Brook encouraged settlers, who arrived after 1800. The 1857 Cold Brook Feed Mill was listed on the National Register of Historic Places in 1974.

== Geography ==
Cold Brook is located at 43°14′27″N 75°2′21″W (43.240968, -75.039221). According to the United States Census Bureau, the village has a total area of 0.44 square miles (1.14 km^{2}), all land. The village is on sloping terrain with occasionally steep roadways.

The main street of Cold Brook is New York State Route 8, which leads northeast 46 miles (74 km) to Speculator in the Adirondacks and southwest 1.5 miles (2.4 km) to Poland. Utica is 16 miles (26 km) to the southeast via NY-8.

== Demographics ==
Historical population
Census	Pop.	Note	%±
1910	358		—
1920	261		−27.1%
1930	288		10.3%
1940	271		−5.9%
1950	342		26.2%
1960	372		8.8%
1970	413		11.0%
1980	402		−2.7%
1990	310		−22.9%
2000	336		8.4%
2010	329		−2.1%
2020	250		−24.0%
U.S. Decennial Census

As of the census of 2000, there were 336 people, 123 households, and 93 families residing in the village. The population density was 761.2 inhabitants per square mile (293.9/km^{2}). There were 133 housing units at an average density of 301.3 per square mile (116.3/km^{2}). The racial makeup of the village was 99.70% White and 0.30% Asian.

There were 123 households, out of which 39.8% had children under the age of 18 living with them, 55.3% were married couples living together, 14.6% had a female householder with no husband present, and 23.6% were non-families. 19.5% of all households were made up of individuals, and 6.5% had someone living alone who was 65 years of age or older. The average household size was 2.73 and the average family size was 3.12.

In the village, the population was spread out, with 31.5% under the age of 18, 7.1% from 18 to 24, 25.6% from 25 to 44, 22.0% from 45 to 64, and 13.7% who were 65 years of age or older. The median age was 34 years. For every 100 females, there were 107.4 males. For every 100 females age 18 and over, there were 101.8 males.

The median income for a household in the village was $30,455, and the median income for a family was $33,333. Males had a median income of $22,500 versus $18,542 for females. The per capita income for the village was $13,674. About 12.0% of families and 10.9% of the population were below the poverty line, including 15.2% of those under age 18 and 8.6% of those age 65 or over.
