= Walter Rosenblum =

American photographer

- Born: October 1, 1919; New York City
- Died: January 23, 2006 (aged 86)
- Known for: Photography
- Spouse: Naomi Rosenblum
- Website: rosenblumphoto.org

Walter A. Rosenblum (October 1, 1919 – January 23, 2006) was an American photographer known for his street photography in New York, his service as a U.S. Army Signal Corps combat cameraman during World War II, and his decades-long career as a photography educator. His work is held in the collections of major institutions, including the Museum of Modern Art and the J. Paul Getty Museum.

== Biography ==
=== Early life and the Photo League ===
Rosenblum was born on October 1, 1919, in New York City to Romanian Jewish immigrants. He grew up on New York’s Lower East Side.

While at City College, he learned about the New York Photo League, a collective dedicated to social documentary photography. He became an active member, studying with Lewis Hine and Paul Strand, who became a lifelong friend and mentor, and holding several leadership roles, including editor of Photo Notes and president. He also taught photography courses there during the 1940s.

He began with street photography through the Photo League and became known for documenting scenes of urban life with empathy and clarity. His first major photo essay, “Pitt Street” (1938), was created when Rosenblum was just 19, while working under Sid Grossman, director of the Photo League school. Set in a Lower East Side tenement neighborhood, the series documents working-class life during the Great Depression. Featuring portraits such as Girl on a Swing and Children Playing Cards, it acknowledges the hardships of the area's residents while focusing on their sense of community and resilience.

=== Wartime photography ===
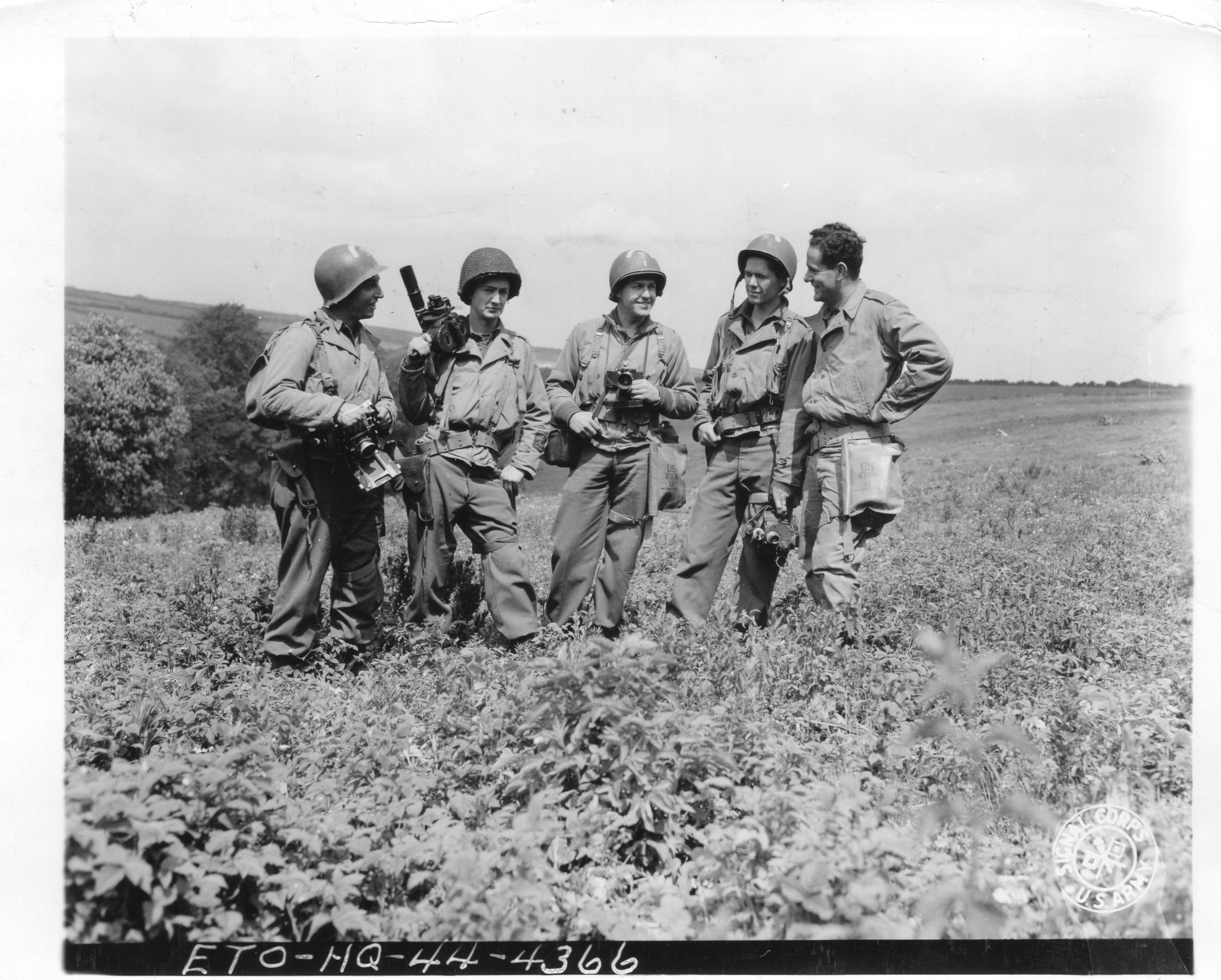
Walter Rosenblum (far right) and other members of the Signal Corps Photographic Combat Unit. June, 1944

During World War II, Rosenblum enlisted in the U.S. Army and served as a combat photographer with the 162nd Signal Photographic Company. He photographed D-Day landing at Normandy in 1944 while his detachment was temporarily assigned to the 165th Signal Photographic Company, documented fighting through France and Germany, and was among the first Allied photographers to enter the liberated Dachau concentration camp in the spring of 1945.

Rosenblum's honors include a Silver Star, Bronze Star, Purple Heart, Presidential Unit Citation, 5 battle stars and an arrowhead device. His combat photography from the war has been widely recognized for its technical and documentary significance.

His wartime photography is in collections of museums around the world.

=== Postwar work and teaching career ===
After the war, Rosenblum continued his socially conscious photography, documenting refugee relief efforts in postwar France and Czechoslovakia for the Unitarian Service Committee. He became a dedicated educator in 1947, teaching for several decades at Brooklyn College. He also taught at the Yale Summer School of Music and Art from 1952 to 1976, Cooper Union from 1956 to 65, and lectured internationally.

He continued to document communities from the Gaspé Peninsula in Quebec to Haiti and back to his American street photography in East Harlem and the South Bronx.

Rosenblum's career spanned over seven decades, leaving a legacy of documenting everyday life with dignity, clarity, and empathy.

== Select exhibitions ==
- 1943 – New Photographers I, Museum of Modern Art, New York; curated by Nancy Newhall
- 1944 – American Red Cross, London
- 1962 – Five Photographers, A Photographer’s Place, Philadelphia, Pennsylvania
- 1964 – Photographs of Haiti, George Eastman House, Rochester, New York; Germantown Arts Association, Philadelphia, Pennsylvania
- 1965 – Ten American Photographers, School of Fine Arts, University of Wisconsin, Milwaukee (invitational exhibition)
- 1966 – Photography in the Twentieth Century, National Gallery of Canada, Toronto (group exhibition)
- 1969 – Carr House Gallery, Rhode Island School of Design, Providence, Rhode Island
- 1969 – Focus on Brooklyn 2, Brooklyn Museum
- 1972 – Masters of Photography, Layton School of Art and Design, Milwaukee, Wisconsin (group exhibition)
- 1973 – Haitian Photographs, Centrum Gallery, Hampshire College, Amherst, Massachusetts
- 1975 – Fogg Museum, Harvard University, Cambridge, Massachusetts
- 1976 – Photopia Gallery, Philadelphia; Milwaukee Center for Photography, Milwaukee, Wisconsin
- 1976 – American Photography – American Labor, Kunsthalle Berlin (co-curator and catalog essay)
- 1983 – Founding Members, Society for Photographic Education, Philadelphia, Pennsylvania (group exhibition)
- 1984 – People of the South Bronx, Lehman College Art Gallery, Bronx, New York
- 1985 – Castle Gallery, College of New Rochelle, New York; Henry Street Settlement Gallery, New York (group exhibitions)
- 1986 – Pitt Street, New York, 1938–39, Baruch College-CUNY and Hebrew College, Boston; "A Retrospective Exhibition", University of Maryland, Baltimore
- 1986 – Retrospective exhibition, Altes Museum, Berlin
- 1988 – Photography Masters of the 30s: Points of View, Pelham Art Center, New York (group exhibition)
- 1988 – Retrospective exhibition, Havana, Cuba
- 1988 – Photographs of Haiti, Brooklyn Museum, New York

== Personal life ==
He was married to Naomi Rosenblum, a prominent photographic historian and author of The World History of Photography and A History of Women Photographers. The couple were active in New York’s mid-20th-century photography community and collaborated on exhibitions and publications.

They had two daughters: Lisa, a former executive in the communications industry, and Nina, a documentary filmmaker.

Rosenblum died January 23, 2006.

== Documentary films ==
Two documentary films have examined Rosenblum’s life and photographic legacy.

Walter Rosenblum: In Search of Pitt Street (1999), directed by his daughter, Nina Rosenblum, is a feature-length documentary that chronicles his life as a photographer, educator, and World War II combat cameraman. It explores his early involvement with the Photo League, his street photography on New York’s Lower East Side, and his military documentation of major events including the D‑Day landings and the liberation of Dachau.

The 2025 film, They Fight With Cameras, was directed by Nina Rosenblum and Daniel Allentuck, and narrated by Liev Schreiber. Focusing on Rosenblum’s service as a U.S. Army Signal Corps cameraman, it draws on archival footage, photographs, and personal letters to document his experience during World War II.

== Collections ==
- The J. Paul Getty Museum
- The Museum of Modern Art
- The Jewish Museum

== Awards and honors ==
- Guggenheim Foundation Fellowship for "People of the South Bronx" (1980)
- National Endowment of the Arts grant
- Simon Wiesenthal Award
- Honorary doctorate in Fine Arts from the University of Maryland (1986)
- Lifetime Achievement Award: International Center of Photography (1998)

=== Decorations ===
U.S. military decorations
Image	Decoration	Notes	Refs.
	Silver Star		
	Bronze Star		
	Purple Heart		
	Presidential Unit Citation		
Arrowhead ribbon device	Arrowhead device		
