= Edgar Oehler =

Swiss businessman and politician (1942–2025)

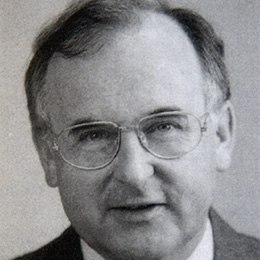
- Oehler in 1995

Member of the National Council
- In office 29 November 1971 – 3 December 1995

Personal details
- Born: 2 March 1942 Balgach, St. Gallen, Switzerland
- Died: 13 March 2025 (aged 83)
- Party: Christian Democratic People's Party
- Spouse: Marianne Metzler (m. 1976)
- Children: 4 (adopted)
- Education: Dallas High School (Oregon)
- Alma mater: University of St. Gallen

Edgar Oehler (2 March 1942 – 13 March 2025) was a Swiss businessman and politician who was a member of the National Council and served as a member for the Christian Democratic People's Party from 1971 to 1995.

== Early life and education ==
Oehler was born into a modest family in Balgach, Switzerland to Ludwig Oehler and Rosa (née Eschenmoser). His father was a commercial painter and the family often struggled to make ends meet. He completed the public schools at Balgach and Widnau before entering the Kantonsschule St. Gallen where he completed his Matura in 1962. In 1961, he took part in a student exchange, earning an American high school diploma at Dallas Senior High School in Dallas, Oregon. He then served his mandatory military service with the Swiss Armed Forces in the function of infantryman. Between 1963 and 1967 he studied at University of St. Gallen Political science with a major in Public law. He completed an exchange semester at the International Christian University in Tokyo, Japan. He earned his PhD in 1975.

== Career ==
During his college studies Oehler ventured into the world of business, operating a plaster company and worked as journalist for various newspapers such as the daily newspaper Die Ostschweiz. He stopped with those activities when he entered Arbonia Forster Group (AFG), in which he was employed from 1985 to 1990 as general director. On 11 September 2003 he took-over the majority of the shares of the group as well as all its subsidiaries. Until 2014 he was majority shareholder and board member of the group.

== Politics ==
Oehler was a member of the National Council (Switzerland) from 1971 until 1995 for the Christian Democratic People's Party (CVP). He was a member of several commissions focussing on economy, finance and state and foreign policy. From 1991 to 2004 he was the president of the Association of the Swiss Tobacco Industry and a lobbyist of the tobacco industry.

== Personal life and death ==
From 1976, Oehler was married to Marianne (née Metzler), and resided in Horgen, Balgach and Miami Beach, Florida. His wife is a painter. He had no biological children but four adopted daughters which were conveyed by the controversial adoption agency of Alice Honegger in Sri Lanka.

Oehler had an estimated net worth of $270–320 million (as of 2020) by Bilanz magazine.

Oehler died on 13 March 2025, at the age of 83.

== Literature ==
- Edgar Oehler: Stammtafeln Öler, Oeler, Öhler und Oehler von Balgach SG
