= Buck Hill (Herkimer County, New York) =

Mountain in New York, United States

- Location within New York Location within the United States

Highest point
- Elevation: 928 feet (283 m)
- Coordinates: 43°14′13″N 75°03′31″W

Geography
- Location: N of Poland, New York, U.S.
- Topo map: USGS Newport

Buck Hill is a summit located in Central New York Region of New York located in the Town of Russia in Herkimer County, north of Poland.
