= Little Grunt and the Big Egg =

Book by Tomie dePaola

- Author: Tomie dePaola
- Illustrator: Tomie dePaola
- Language: English
- Genre: picture book, fairy tale, children's book
- Publisher: G. P. Putname
- Publication date: 1990
- Publication place: United States
- Media type: Hardcover

Little Grunt and the Big Egg: A Prehistoric Fairy Tale is a 1990 children's picture book written and illustrated by Tomie dePaola. Published by G. P. Putnam, it is frequently studied in elementary schools in the United States. It was adapted into a play by William Morton.

== Plot summary ==
The Grunt Tribe live in a big cave next to a volcano. When Little Grunt is told that the Ugga-Wugga Tribe is coming over for Sunday brunch the next day Mama Grunt orders him to find some eggs so that she can make an omelette. Little Grunt searches high and low and there are no eggs to be found anywhere. Just then he stumbles over the biggest egg he has ever seen. He carefully drags it home so that it doesn't break and shows it to his family. They are very impressed. The egg is left in front of the fire when all the Grunts go to bed. During the night they all wake up to a cracking and breaking noise and, in the hearth, they find a baby dinosaur amongst the broken eggshells. Little Grunt keeps the dinosaur, whom he names "George", as a pet and so begins a strong friendship.

== Reception ==
Kirkus Reviews found "The illustrations are typical dePaola. The kids will lap it up, as they do TV cartoons of the same undemanding quality." while Publishers Weekly stated "This lively twist on the familiar tale of a boy and his pet is sure to provoke giggles."
