= Russia, New York =

- Town
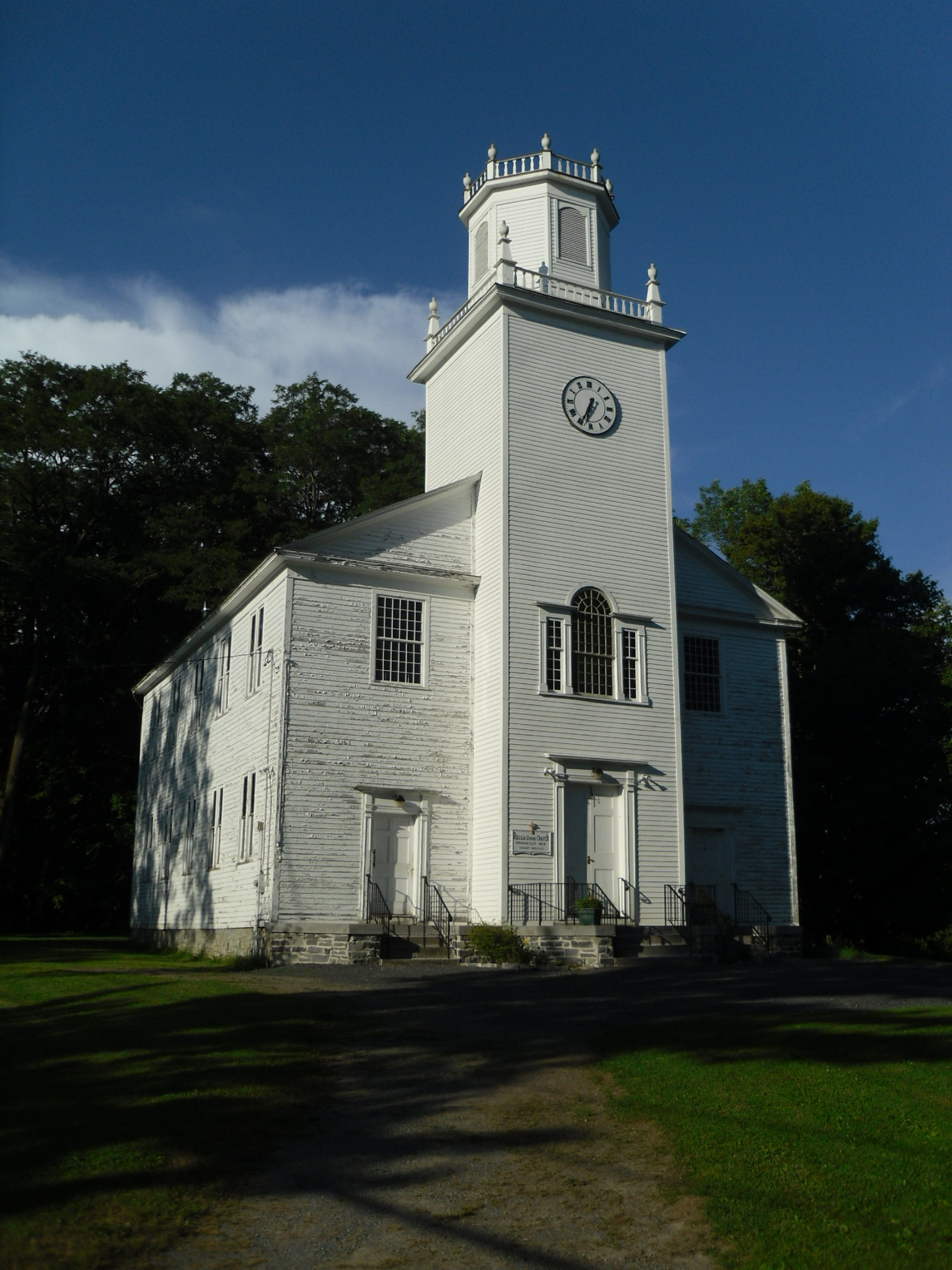
- Russia Union Church

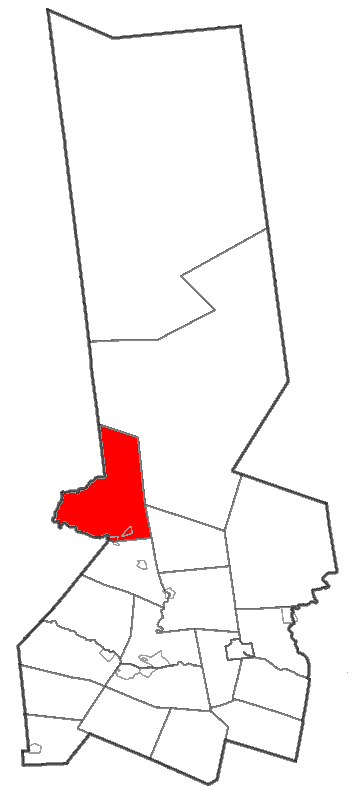
- Location within Herkimer County

- Location within New York Location within the United States
- Coordinates: 43°17′47″N 75°4′46″W
- Country: United States
- State: New York
- County: Herkimer
- Formed: April 7, 1806, as Union
- Renamed: April 6, 1808, to Russia

Government
  - Type: Town Council
  - Town Supervisor: Frances J. Donley (R)
  - Town Council: Members' List: • Wayne G. Haver (R); • Walter S. Gifford (R); • Louis A. Bravo, Sr. (R); • Ronald S. Prezelski (R)

Area
  - Total: 60.42 sq mi (156.48 km^{2})
  - Land: 56.96 sq mi (147.53 km^{2})
  - Water: 3.46 sq mi (8.95 km^{2})
- Elevation: 1,322 ft (403 m)

Population (2020)
  - Total: 2,269
- Demonym: Russian
- Time zone: UTC-5 (Eastern (EST))
  - Summer (DST): UTC-4 (EDT)
- ZIP Codes: 13324 (Cold Brook); 13431 (Poland); 13438 (Remsen); 13304 (Barneveld)
- Area code: 315
- FIPS code: 36-043-64254
- GNIS feature ID: 0979443
- Website: townofrussia.com

Russia is a town in Herkimer County, New York, United States. The population was 2,269 at the 2020 census, down from 2,587 in 2010. The town is located in the northwestern part of the county and is northeast of Utica.

The northern part of the town is in the Adirondack Park.

== History ==
The town of Norway was organized in 1792. The town of Russia – called Union until 1808 – was formed from the town of Norway in 1806. In 1836, part of Russia, along with part of the town of Ohio, was used to form the now-defunct town of Wilmurt. As of 1875, the main "industrial pursuits" of Russia were cheesemaking and buttermaking, while the primary farm products (besides flint corn, buckwheat etc) were maple sugar, apples, potatoes, and oats. When the town of Webb was formed in 1896, much of Wilmurt was transferred to Webb with the rest returned to Ohio.

In 1865, the population of Russia was 2,030.

== Geography ==
According to the United States Census Bureau, the town has a total area of 60.4 square miles (156.5 km^{2}), of which 57.0 square miles (147.5 km^{2}) are land and 3.5 square miles (9.0 km^{2}), or 5.72%, are water. Hinckley Reservoir, an impoundment on West Canada Creek, crosses the north-central part of the town. West Canada Creek forms the western boundary of the town (the border with Oneida County, south of the reservoir.

New York State Route 8 and New York State Route 28 converge at Poland village.

== Demographics ==
Historical population
Census	Pop.	Note	%±
1820	1,685		—
1830	2,458		45.9%
1840	2,298		−6.5%
1850	2,349		2.2%
1860	2,389		1.7%
1870	2,220		−7.1%
1880	2,177		−1.9%
1890	2,145		−1.5%
1900	2,025		−5.6%
1910	1,772		−12.5%
1920	1,433		−19.1%
1930	1,347		−6.0%
1940	1,281		−4.9%
1950	1,420		10.9%
1960	1,761		24.0%
1970	2,160		22.7%
1980	2,405		11.3%
1990	2,294		−4.6%
2000	2,487		8.4%
2010	2,587		4.0%
2020	2,269		−12.3%
U.S. Decennial Census

As of the census of 2000, there were 2,487 people, 993 households, and 707 families residing in the town. The population density was 44.0 inhabitants per square mile (17.0/km^{2}). There were 1,252 housing units at an average density of 22.1 per square mile (8.5/km^{2}). The racial makeup of the town was 97.75% White, 0.32% African American, 0.56% Native American, 0.72% Asian, 0.12% from other races, and 0.52% from two or more races. Hispanic or Latino of any race were 0.44% of the population.

There were 993 households, out of which 30.8% had children under the age of 18 living with them, 56.9% were married couples living together, 7.0% had a female householder with no husband present, and 28.8% were non-families. 23.1% of all households were made up of individuals, and 7.7% had someone living alone who was 65 years of age or older. The average household size was 2.50 and the average family size was 2.90.

In the town, the population was spread out, with 24.8% under the age of 18, 6.6% from 18 to 24, 28.1% from 25 to 44, 26.4% from 45 to 64, and 14.0% who were 65 years of age or older. The median age was 39 years. For every 100 females, there were 109.7 males. For every 100 females age 18 and over, there were 107.4 males.

The median income for a household in the town was $35,588, and the median income for a family was $40,847. Males had a median income of $29,798 versus $20,968 for females. The per capita income for the town was $17,563. About 12.1% of families and 14.9% of the population were below the poverty line, including 25.8% of those under age 18 and 13.9% of those age 65 or over.

== Communities and locations in Russia ==
- Buck Hill – An elevation located north of Poland.
- Cold Brook – The village of Cold Brook is east of Poland village on NY-8.
- Gang Mills – A former community in the northwestern part of the town. The name is from the large number of lumber mills once located in the settlement.
- Grant – A hamlet in the northeastern part of the town, on Black Creek, south of the Hinckley Reservoir on County Road 184.
- Gravesville – A hamlet west of Russia village, located on Gravesville Road (County Road 242). It is named after William Graves, an early settler.
- Hinckley Reservoir – An impoundment on West Canada Creek in the northern part of the town.
- Northwood – A hamlet on the western town line north of the Hinckley Reservoir.
- Pardeeville Corners – A location southeast of Grant.
- Poland – The village of Poland is at the southern town line by West Canada Creek at the junction of NY-8 and NY-28.
- Russia Corners – The hamlet of Russia is in the south-central part of the town, north of Poland at the junction of County Route 47 (Military Rd), County Route 133 (Russia Rd), and Beecher Road. The Russia Corners Historic District was added to the National Register of Historic Places in 1996.
- Sand Hill – An elevation located just northeast of the village of Cold Brook off NY Route 8. Sand Hill is 1,542 feet (470 m) above sea level .
- Trenton Falls – A hamlet at the western town line on County Road 247.
- Wheelertown – A hamlet in the northern part of Russia, located on Wheelertown Road.
