= Arnold Spilka =

American children's illustrator, writer, and poet

Arnold Spilka (November 14, 1917 - December 14, 2002) was an American children's illustrator, writer and poet.

Spilka was born in New York City and attended the Art Students League where he studied drawing with Rico Lebrun, and sculpture with John Hovannes. He illustrated many books for other writers, including Robert Froman, John Lawson, Beman Lord, and Ann McGovern. He was the writer and illustrator of A Rumbudgin of Nonsense (1970) a picture book of nonsense verse (OCLC 91563) as well as A Lion I Can Do Without (1964), And the Frog Went Blah (1972), and Bumples, Fumdidlers, and Jellybeans (1996).

Among his poems are Don't Tell Me That I Talk Too Much and Flowers are a Silly Bunch, which starts by listing aspects of nature (such as trees are bossy, and lakes are shy), but turns out to be a poem about liking the city.

Some of his papers and original drawings from 1960 to 1970 have been donated to the University of Minnesota and are held in its Children's Literature Research Collections.
