= Cold Brook Feed Mill =

- U.S. National Register of Historic Places
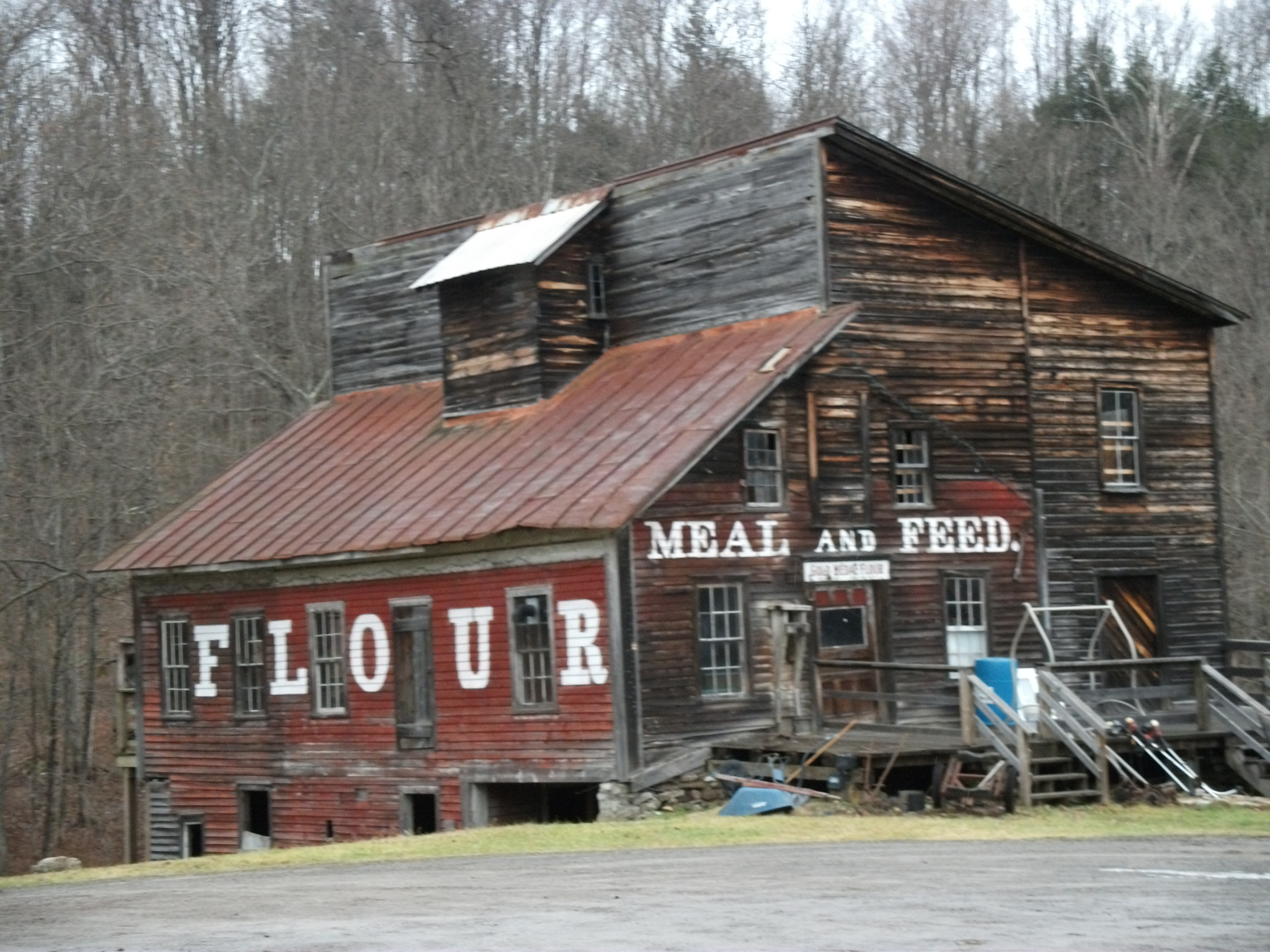
- Cold Brook Feed Mill, January 2011

- Location within New York Location within the United States
- Location: NY 8, Cold Brook, New York
- Coordinates: 43°14′23″N 75°2′29″W
- Area: less than one acre
- Built: 1857
- Architect: Torrey, Ira
- NRHP reference No.: 74001243
- Added to NRHP: October 9, 1974

Cold Brook Feed Mill is a historic grist mill located at Cold Brook in Herkimer County, New York. It includes the mill, mill dam, flume, and land on both sides of the stream between the mill and dam. The mill is a simple wood-frame structure built in 1857. The main block is two story, square structure with a shed roof, and attached is a one-story, plus basement, lean-to, added after 1857. It is equipped with the original water powered stone grinder and corn sheller.

It was listed on the National Register of Historic Places in 1974.
