= Kathryn Abbe =

American photographer

- Abbe at her house in 2005
- Born: Kathryn McLaughlin; September 22, 1919; Brooklyn, New York City, U.S.
- Died: January 18, 2014 (aged 94)
- Education: Pratt Institute, New School for Social Research
- Occupation: Photographer
- Employer(s): Vogue, freelance photography
- Known for: Photographs in Vogue, Better Homes and Gardens, McCall's, Parents, and Good Housekeeping; a book, Twins on Twins, written with her twin sister
- Spouse: James Abbe Jr. (m. 1946)
- Children: 3
- Relatives: Frances McLaughlin-Gill (twin sister); Tomie dePaola (cousin)
- Awards: Prix de Paris, 1941

Kathryn Abbe (September 22, 1919 – January 18, 2014) was an American photographer.

== Early life and education ==
Kathryn Abbe was born Kathryn McLaughlin in 1919, in Brooklyn. Her twin sister was photographer Frances McLaughlin-Gill. They were raised in Wallingford, Connecticut, and were the valedictorian and salutatorian of their graduating class at Lyman Hall High School. Abbe attended the Pratt Institute, where she studied under Walter Civardi and painter Reginald Marsh; she graduated with a Bachelor of Fine Arts degree in 1941. She also attended the New School for Social Research from 1939 until 1941, where she studied under Yasuo Kuniyoshi. In 1946, she married photographer James Abbe Jr., the son of the Hollywood photographer James Abbe. The couple had three children. She and her sister were the cousins of artist Tomie dePaola.

== Career ==
Abbe won Vogue magazine's Prix de Paris photography award in 1941. By 1942, she was working for Vogue under Toni Frissell; she left the magazine and became a professional freelance photographer in 1944 – one of few women to hold the position at the time. Although in the 1940s she photographed New England and Brooklyn extensively, by the mid-1940s her assignments took her around the world, notably to Paris, Havana, New York, Rome and Milan. Her subjects often included fashion icons, entertainment personalities, children, street vignettes, and artists. Her photographs of Carmen Dell'Orefice and Lisa Fonssagrives are particularly striking. Her work was published in over eighty books and international periodicals, among them, Better Homes and Gardens, McCall's, Cosmopolitan, Good Housekeeping, Paris Match, and Vogue. She was awarded more than twenty major magazine covers – a rare achievement for a female photographer of her time.

A co-author of three books, Stars of the Twenties Observed by James Abbe (1974), Twins on Twins, (with her twin sister, 1980), and Twin Lives in Photography (2011), Abbe lectured extensively and appeared on many television programs, among them, the Dick Cavett Show. A 2000 documentary, Twin Lenses, was produced about the lives and careers of Kathryn Abbe and Frances McLaughlin–Gill.
