= George and Doris Hauman =

American illustrators of children's books

George Hauman (1890–1961) and Doris Holt Hauman (August 29, 1898 – 1984) were American illustrators of children's books. They illustrated a popular 1954 edition of The Little Engine That Could.

== Lives ==
Doris Holt was born in West Somerville, Massachusetts, on August 29, 1898. Doris went to the Normal Art School located in Boston, Massachusetts. Doris and George married in 1924, when he lived in a studio apartment directly below hers. They had one son. George died in 1961 and Doris died in 1984.

Doris and George Hauman lived in Scituate, MA, on Third Cliff overlooking the Atlantic Ocean.

== Careers ==
The two decided that because they had so many of the same customers, they were going to start working together on projects, using "Doris and George Hauman" as the signature on all of their illustrations. Doris wrote the books they created together, and helped George with the illustrations. One of the books they wrote and illustrated, Happy Harbor, A Seashore Story (New York: Macmillan, 1938), depicts a town much like Scituate. After George's death Doris worked for 14 years at the Derby Academy, where she taught courses in art.

Although there had been many previous editions of this classic story, "It was the work of George and Doris Hauman that earned The Little Engine the title of being worthy to sit on the same shelf as Alice's Adventures in Wonderland." Namely, the title was one of 17 that received the inaugural Lewis Carroll Shelf Awards in 1958.

== Selected works ==
- Little Jonathan by Miriam E. Mason. Macmillan, 1944.
- Happy Jack by Miriam E. Mason. Macmillan, 1945.
- Herman, the Brave Pig by Miriam E. Mason. Macmillan, 1949.
- Hominy and His Blunt-nosed Arrow by Miriam E. Mason. Macmillan, 1950.
