= Dallas High School (Oregon) =

Public school in Dallas, Oregon, United States

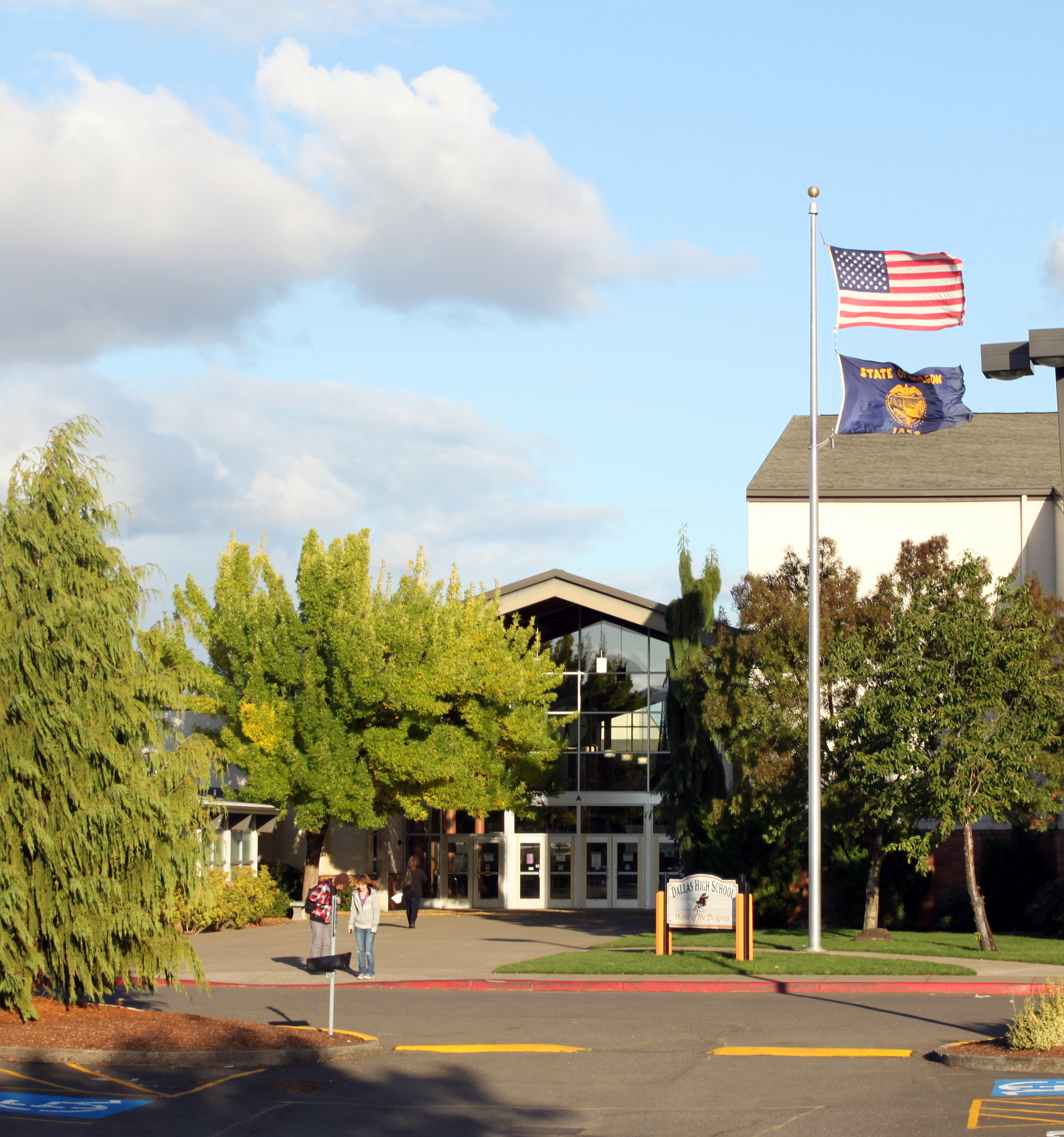

Location
- 1250 Southeast Holman Avenue; Dallas, (Polk County), Oregon 97338; United States; 44.916437°N 123.304297°W

Information
- Type: Public
- Opened: 1924
- School district: Dallas School District
- Principal: Tim Larson
- Teaching staff: 38.13 (FTE)
- Grades: 9-12
- Enrollment: 948 (2024-2025)
- Student to teacher ratio: 24.86
- Colors: Beaver Orange and Black
- Athletics conference: OSAA 5A-3 Mid-Willamette Conference
- Mascot: Dexter the Dragon
- Team name: Dragons
- Website: Dallas High School

Dallas High School is a public high school in Dallas, Oregon, United States.

== Academics ==
In 2011, 51% of the school's seniors received a traditional high school diploma. Of 240 students, 123 graduated on time, 45 dropped out, and 65 were still in high school the following year, or were participating in the Extended Campus program through Chemeketa Community College.

In 2022, 77% of the school's seniors received a high school diploma. Of 243 students, 190 graduated and 53 dropped out.

== Athletics ==
Dallas High School athletic teams compete in the OSAA 5A-3 Mid-Willamette Conference. The athletic director is Ron Snively and the athletics secretary is Danielle Landis.

State Championships:

- Boys Basketball: 1958, 1987
- Band: 1990, 1992, 1993, 1994
- Cheerleading: 1990, 1995
- Dance/Drill: 2012
- Football: 1986
- Softball: 2023
- Speech: 1987, 1988, 1989, 1992
- Wrestling: 2012, 2018, 2024

== Controversy ==
In 2020, people reached out to the Dallas School Board and called on them to change the school's mascot in response to the George Floyd protests. They expressed concern that the Dragon mascot had a possible connection to the Ku Klux Klan, stating that leaders of the KKK are called "Grand Dragons." The name has been kept however, as there is no certain evidence or history suggesting that the Dallas Mascot has any relation to the KKK.

== Notable alumni ==
- Evelyn Sibley Lampman, American writer
- Connie Munk. Nevada politician
- Edgar Oehler, Swiss politician
