= Tomie dePaola =

American illustrator and writer (1934–2020)

- Born: Thomas Anthony dePaola; September 15, 1934; Meriden, Connecticut, U.S.
- Died: March 30, 2020 (aged 85); Lebanon, New Hampshire, U.S.
- Education: Pratt Institute (BFA)
- Occupations: Writer, illustrator
- Relatives: Frances McLaughlin-Gill and Kathryn Abbe (twin cousins)
- Writing career
- Period: 1965–2020
- Genres: Children's picture books, folklore, educational paperbacks
- Notable work: Strega Nona
- Notable awards: Children's Literature Legacy Award; 2011

Signature
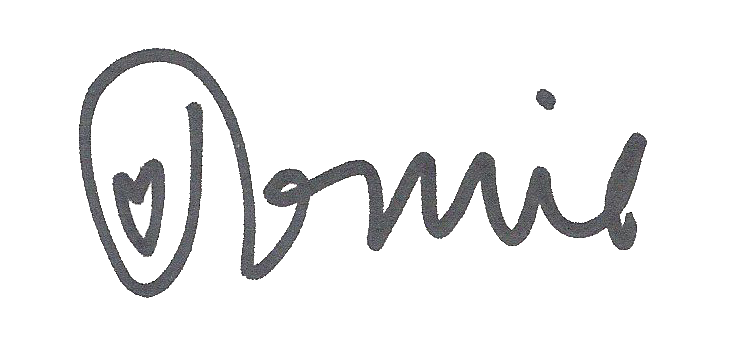

Thomas Anthony "Tomie" dePaola (/ˈtɒmi dəˈpaʊlə/; September 15, 1934 – March 30, 2020) was an American writer and illustrator who created more than 260 children's books, such as Strega Nona. He received the Children's Literature Legacy Award for his lifetime contribution to American children's literature in 2011.

== Early life and education ==
DePaola was born in Meriden, Connecticut, to a family of Irish and Italian heritage, the son of Joseph and Florence May (Downey) DePaola. He had one brother, Joseph (nicknamed Buddy), and two sisters, Judie and Maureen. His paternal grandparents originated from Calabria, where he set his well-known book Strega Nona. His book The Baby Sister is about Maureen being born. DePaola was attracted to art at the age of four, and credited his family with encouraging his development as an artist and influencing the themes of his works.

After high school, dePaola studied art at the Pratt Institute in Brooklyn and graduated in 1956 with a Bachelor of Fine Arts degree. He was a pupil and lifelong friend of Roger Crossgrove.

== Career ==
=== Teaching ===
DePaola taught art at Newton College of the Sacred Heart outside Boston from 1962 to 1966, then moved to California, where he taught at San Francisco College for Women from 1967 to 1970. He received a Master of Fine Arts degree from California College of Arts and Crafts in 1969 and a doctoral equivalency from Lone Mountain College in San Francisco. DePaola relocated to New England in the 1970s, teaching art at Chamberlayne Junior College in Boston from 1972 to 1973. From 1973 to 1976, he worked at Colby-Sawyer College in New London, New Hampshire, as an associate professor, designer, and technical director in the speech and theater department and as writer and set and costume designer for the Children's Theatre Project. He taught art at New England College in Henniker, New Hampshire, from 1976 to 1978. DePaola retired from full-time teaching in 1978 to devote his time to writing and illustrating books. He provided illustrations for Maggie and the Monster Baby (Holiday House, 1987) by Elizabeth Winthrop.

=== Writing ===
The first published book that dePaola illustrated was a 1965 volume in the Coward-McCann series "Science is what and why": Sound, written by Lisa Miller. The first that he wrote and illustrated was The Wonderful Dragon of Timlin, published by Bobbs-Merrill in 1966. His writing career spanned over 50 years during which he worked on more than 270 books. Close to 25 million copies of his books were sold worldwide, and were translated into over 20 languages. Perhaps his most well-known work, Strega Nona, was first published in 1975 and was a finalist for the coveted Caldecott Medal for best illustrated work.

=== Television ===
DePaola has appeared in 3 episodes of Barney & Friends as himself. In 2001, he also appeared as himself in the Jim Henson Company series Telling Stories with Tomie dePaola.

== Exhibitions ==
DePaola had two exhibitions in 2013–2014 at the Colby-Sawyer College. The first, called "Then" showed his early work during his formative years at the Pratt Institute and the influence Fra Angelico, George Roualt and others had on him. The second exhibition was of his later work, called "Now," came out close to dePaola's 80th birthday.

== Personal life and death ==
DePaola was briefly married to a woman in the 1960s, however later came out as gay. He came out later in his life, telling The New York Times Magazine in 2019 that, for much of his career, "If it became known you were gay, you’d have a big red ‘G’ on your chest... and schools wouldn't buy your books anymore." He resided in New London, New Hampshire, where he taught from 1973 to 1976.

DePaola died on March 30, 2020 at the age of 85 years-old in the Dartmouth-Hitchcock Medical Center in Lebanon, New Hampshire, according to his literary agent, Doug Whiteman. He was badly injured in a fall in his barn studio the previous week and died of complications following surgery. He was survived by his two sisters Judith and Maureen (the latter being his best friend) and many nieces and nephews.

== Awards and honors ==
In 2011, dePaola received the biennial Children's Literature Legacy Award from the U.S. children's librarians, which recognizes a living author or illustrator whose books, published in the United States, have made "a substantial and lasting contribution to literature for children". The committee noted the wide range of his stories and his "innate understanding of childhood, a distinctive visual style, and a remarkable ability to adapt his voice to perfectly suit the story." It called Strega Nona, the wise Grandma Witch, "an enduring character who has charmed generations of children."

The Pratt Institute honored him with an honorary doctorate on May 18, 2009. The New Hampshire Institute of Art honored him with an honorary Doctorate of Fine Arts on May 20, 2018.

For his contribution as a children's illustrator, dePaola was the U.S. nominee in 1990 for the biennial, international Hans Christian Andersen Award, the highest international recognition for creators of children's books.

For single works he has won the 1983 Golden Kite Award, Picture Book Illustration, from the Society of Children's Book Writers and Illustrators for Giorgio's Village, which he also wrote. He won the 1994 Aesop Prize from the American Folklore Society for Christopher, the Holy Giant and the 2000 Southwest Book Award from the Border Regional Library Association for Night of Las Posadas.

DePaola received a Caldecott Honor in 1976 (Strega Nona), the 1982 Boston Globe-Horn Book Award (The Friendly Beasts: An Old English Christmas Carol), the 1987 Golden Kite Award (What the Mailman Brought), and a 2000 Newbery Honor (26 Fairmount Avenue). The Caldecott and Newbery Medals are the premier annual American Library Association awards for picture book illustration and children's book writing, respectively.

He won the 2000 Jeremiah Ludington Memorial Award from the Educational Paperback Association for his cumulative "significant contribution to the educational paperback business".

In 2023, the United States Postal Service honored DePaola with a U.S. Postage Stamp featuring Strega Nona. The stamp was released on May 5, 2023, following an official dedication at the Currier Museum of Art in Manchester, New Hampshire.

== Selected works ==
=== Strega Nona series ===
- Strega Nona (1975)
- Big Anthony and the Magic Ring (1979)
- Strega Nona's Magic Lessons (1982)
- Merry Christmas, Strega Nona (1986)
- Strega Nona Meets Her Match (1993)
- Strega Nona—Her Story (1996)
- Big Anthony—His Story (1998)
- Strega Nona Takes a Vacation (2000)
- Brava, Strega Nona!: A Heartwarming Pop-Up Book (2008)
- Strega Nona's Harvest (2009)
- Strega Nona's Gift (2011)
- Strega Nona Does It Again (2013)
- Strega Nona and Her Tomatoes (2017) – a Ready-to-Read book
- Strega Nona and the Twins (2017) – a Ready-to-Read book

=== Memoir series (first chapter book) ===
- 26 Fairmount Avenue
- Here We All Are
- On My Way
- What a Year
- Things Will Never Be the Same (The War Years)
- I'm Still Scared (The War Years)
- Why? (The War Years)
- For the Duration (The War Years)

=== Big Books ===
- Front Porch Tales and North Country Whoppers
- Christmas Remembered
- Tomie dePaola's Big Book of Favorite Legends
- Tomie dePaola's Book of Bible Stories
- Tomie dePaola's Favorite Nursery Tales
- Tomie dePaola's Mother Goose

=== About growing up and his family ===
- The Art Lesson
- The Baby Sister
- Nana Upstairs & Nana Downstairs
- Stagestruck
- Tom
- Tony's Bread
- Watch Out for the Chicken Feet in Your Soup

=== Bill and Pete books ===
- Bill and Pete
- Bill and Pete Go Down the Nile
- Bill and Pete to the Rescue

=== The Barkers ===
- Boss for a Day
- Hide and Seek All Week
- Meet the Barkers
- Morgan and Moffat Go to School
- A New Barker in the House
- Trouble in the Barker's Class

=== Board books for the very young ===
- I Love You Sun, I Love You Moon
- Marcos Counts
- Mary Had a Little Lamb
- Mice Squeak We Speak
- Tomie's Little Book of Love
- Tomie's Baa Baa Black Sheep
- Tomie's Little Book of Poems
- Tomie's Little Mother Goose
- Tomie's Mother Goose Flies Again
- Tomie's Three Bears and Other Tales

=== Movies (in DVD format) ===
- Tomie Live in Concert
- Oliver Button is a Star
- Charlie, Come Home
- The Strega Nona Movie

=== Legends, folktales and stories ===
- Adelita A Mexican Cinderella Story, a version of Cinderella
- Alice Nizzy Nazzy: The Witch of Santa Fe
- Andy That's My Name
- ”Charlie Needs a Cloak”
- The Cloud Book
- The Comic Adventures of Old Mother Hubbard
- Cookie's Week
- Days of the Blackbird
- Erandi's Braids
- Fin M'Coul
- Four Friends at Christmas
- Four Friends in Autumn
- Four Friends in Summer
- Four Stories for Four Seasons
- Helga's Dowry
- Hey Diddle Diddle and Other Mother Goose Rhymes
- Hunter and the Animals
- I Love You, Mouse
- Jamie O'Rourke and the Big Potato
- Jamie O'Rourke and the Pooka
- Knight and the Dragon
- Legend of the Bluebonnet
- Legend of the Indian Paintbrush
- Legend of the Persian Carpet
- Little Grunt and the Big Egg
- Mice Squeak We Speak
- Michael Bird-Boy
- Mr. Satie and the Great Art Contest
- Mysterious Giant of Barletta
- Now One Foot, Now the Other
- Oliver Button is a Sissy
- Pancakes for Breakfast
- The Popcorn Book
- The Quicksand Book
- The Quilt Story
- Smart about Art: Frida Kahlo
- Shh! We're Writing the Constitution
- T-Rex Is Missing
- The Tale of Rabbit and Coyote
- The Wind and the Sun, a retelling of the fable The North Wind and the Sun

=== Religious or holiday stories ===
- Angels Angels Everywhere
- The Birds of Bethlehem
- The Cat on the Dovrefell: A Christmas Tale
- Christina's Carol
- Christopher the Holy Giant
- The Clown of God
- Country Angel Christmas
- The First Christmas
- Francis Poor Man of Assisi
- The Friendly Beasts: An Old English Christmas Carol
- Get Dressed Santa
- The Good Samaritan and Other Parables
- Guess Who's Coming to Santa's for Dinner?
- Hark! A Christmas Sampler (written by Jane Yolen)
- Hurry, Santa!
- The Holy Twins
- Jingle the Christmas Clown
- Joy to the World: Tomie's Christmas Stories
- The Lady of Guadalupe
- The Legend of Old Befana, concerning a witch (known as Befana) who brings presents to good children on Epiphany Eve (the night of January 5)
- Legend of the Poinsettia
- Let The Whole Earth Sing Praise
- Mary, the Mother of Jesus
- Miracles of Jesus
- Miracle on 34th Street, illustrator, 1984
- My First Chanukah
- My First Christmas
- My First Easter
- My First Halloween
- My First Passover
- My First Thanksgiving
- The Night before Christmas
- The Night of Las Posadas
- Parables of Jesus
- Pascual and the Kitchen Angels
- Patrick Patron Saint of Ireland
- Petook: The Rooster Who Met Jesus (text by Caryll Houselander)
- Queen Esther
- The Song of Francis
- The Story of the Three Wise Kings
- Tomie DePaola's Christmas Tree Book
- Tomie's Little Christmas Pageant

=== Fine art ===
- Station of the Cross (Set of 14) in Abbey Church of Our Lady of Glastonbury, Hingham, Massachusetts
- Depiction of St. Benedict in Abbey Church of Our Lady of Glastonbury, Hingham, Massachusetts
- Frescoes in Refectory of Glastonbury Abbey, Hingham, Massachusetts
- Dominican Retreat and Conference Center Chapel Mural, Niskayuna, New York
- Depiction of Mary and Child, Chapel and Cultural Center, Troy, NY

== See also ==
- Maurice Sendak
