= Lumiere Press =

Lumiere Press is a private press located in Toronto, Ontario, Canada, specializing in photography. Founded in 1981, Lumiere Press publishes books that are letterpress printed and hand bound. The press is owned and run entirely by Michael Torosian, who learned bookmaking in the 1970s, and is described as, "...the very definition of a one-man band... writer, photographer, curator, designer, typesetter, publisher, printer."

Lumiere Press is the only private press exclusively publishing photography books in Canada. The shop's first printing press was acquired in 1981, and the first book, Edward Weston: Dedicated to Simplicity, was published in 1986. To date, the press has published twenty-one limited edition books, on photographers such as, Edward Weston, Paul Strand, Edward Steichen, Frederick Sommer, Lewis Hine, Edward Burtynsky, Gordon Parks, as well as Torosian's own photographic work. Produced in editions of 50-300, often commissioned by galleries or institutions, the books have been acquired by both private collectors and over 150 public institutions (many with standing orders), including the Museum of Modern Art, Thomas Fisher Rare Book Library, International Center of Photography, National Gallery of Canada, Victoria and Albert Museum, New York Public Library; J. Paul Getty Museum, and George Eastman House.

The books have been recognized for design and production excellence, including the "Fifty Books of the Year" award from the American Institute of Graphic Arts (AIGA), the George Wittenborn Memorial Book Award for Excellence in Art Publishing, and a succession of awards from the Alcuin Society.
