= Nana Upstairs & Nana Downstairs =

Book by Tomie dePaola

- Front cover, designed by TOMIE DE PAOLA
- Author: Tomie dePaola
- Cover artist: de Paola
- Language: English
- Genre: Children's
- Publisher: Putnam Juvenile (1997 Hardback edition)
- Publication date: 1973
- Publication place: United States
- Media type: Print (Hardback)
- Pages: 32 p
- ISBN: 0399231080
- OCLC: 35145847
- Dewey Decimal: [E] 20
- LC Class: PZ7.D439 Nan 1997

Nana Upstairs & Nana Downstairs is a 1973 non-fiction children's book by Tomie dePaola which introduces children to the concept of death.

== Content ==
This autobiographical story introduces children to the concept of death through the eyes of 4-year-old Tommy, who has a special relationship with his grandmother and great-grandmother, and visits them regularly. Nana Upstairs dies when he's a child, and Nana Downstairs dies when he's an adult; at both ages, Tommy learns to keep his beloved Nanas in his memory.

The original edition of this autobiographical story was published in 1973; a second edition, published in 1998, has new illustrations and layout.

== Legacy ==
This book has been cited in over 30 other works, including books on how to write, books on childhood grief, and books on other topics.
