= Poland, Herkimer County, New York =

- Village
- Location within New York Location within the United States
- Coordinates: 43°13′34″N 75°03′41″W
- Country: United States
- State: New York
- Region: The Adirondacks
- County: Herkimer
- Towns: Russia, Newport
- Incorporated: 1890

Government
  - Mayor: Mary Paul

Area
  - Total: 0.55 sq mi (1.42 km^{2})
  - Land: 0.54 sq mi (1.41 km^{2})
  - Water: 0.0077 sq mi (0.02 km^{2})
- Elevation: 675 ft (206 m)

Population (2020)
  - Total: 464
  - Density: 854.6/sq mi (329.98/km^{2})
- Time zone: UTC-5 (EST)
  - Summer (DST): UTC-4 (EDT)
- ZIP code: 13431
- Area code: 315
- FIPS code: 36-58937
- Website: villagepoland.digitaltowpath.org:10110/content

Poland is a village in Herkimer County, New York, United States, with a population of 464, as of 2020.

Poland is on the border shared by the towns of Newport and Russia. The village is 16 miles (26 km) north of the county seat in Herkimer and is 14 miles (23 km) northeast of Utica. Poland Central School District has roughly 500 students from grades pre-k to 12th grade.

== History ==
Perspective map of Poland with list of landmarks from 1890 by L.R Burleigh

Poland was briefly called "Maple Valley" and "Russia Flats" when it was first settled around 1800 on land owned by Samuel Wright. The first post office, established in 1838 in the hotel at the corner of Main and Case streets, was known as "Danielsville", after Nahum Daniels, who owned a large amount of land in the village. The first postmaster, Joseph Benchley, soon changed the name because of the confusion with Dansville in western New York. The simplest explanation for the name "Poland" is that the village is adjacent to and southwest of Russia, New York, just like Poland in Europe. In 2019, Poland Central School caught on fire from a wiring issue in the basement.

In 1869 there were 200 residents and approximately 60 buildings. By the 1880s there was a church, store, hotels, grist- and sawmill, tannery sash and blind factory, wagon shop, two blacksmith shops, cheese box factory, cabinet shop, and a bootjack and ladder manufacturer. House building was booming.

Poland had a stop on the Herkimer, Newport and Poland Railway.

By 1906, there were more than 150 buildings even after two disastrous fires.

Poland was incorporated May 10, 1890, with Charles Bowen as the first President (mayor).

== Geography ==
Poland is located in western Herkimer County at 43°13′34″N 75°3′41″W (43.226178, −75.061521). Slightly more than half the village lies in the southern corner of the town of Russia, while the rest of the village extends south into the northwestern corner of the town of Newport.

According to the United States Census Bureau, the village has a total area of 0.55 square miles (1.42 km^{2}), of which 0.01 square miles (0.02 km^{2}), or 1.15%, are water. West Canada Creek, a tributary of the Mohawk River, forms the southwestern boundary of the village. Poland is at the junction of Routes NY-8 (Cold Brook Street) and NY-28 (Main Street).

== Demographics ==
Historical population
Census	Pop.	Note	%±
1880	282		—
1900	370		—
1910	332		−10.3%
1920	349		5.1%
1930	462		32.4%
1940	478		3.5%
1950	511		6.9%
1960	564		10.4%
1970	629		11.5%
1980	553		−12.1%
1990	444		−19.7%
2000	451		1.6%
2010	508		12.6%
2020	464		−8.7%
U.S. Decennial Census

As of the census of 2000, there were 451 people, 192 households, and 126 families residing in the village. The population density was 842.2 inhabitants per square mile (325.2/km^{2}). There were 202 housing units at an average density of 377.2 per square mile (145.6/km^{2}). The racial makeup of the village was 96.67% White, 0.22% African American, 2.66% Asian, and 0.44% from two or more races. Hispanic or Latino of any race were 2.00% of the population.

There were 192 households, out of which 28.1% had children under the age of 18 living with them, 53.6% were married couples living together, 9.9% had a female householder with no husband present, and 33.9% were non-families. 28.6% of all households were made up of individuals, and 14.6% had someone living alone who was 65 years of age or older. The average household size was 2.35 and the average family size was 2.84.

In the village, the population was spread out, with 23.7% under the age of 18, 7.5% from 18 to 24, 27.1% from 25 to 44, 25.3% from 45 to 64, and 16.4% who were 65 years of age or older. The median age was 39 years. For every 100 females, there were 94.4 males. For every 100 females age 18 and over, there were 88.0 males.

The median income for a household in the village was $38,750, and the median income for a family was $45,455. Males had a median income of $27,426 versus $22,159 for females. The per capita income for the village was $17,938. About 8.5% of families and 11.1% of the population were below the poverty line, including 18.9% of those under age 18 and none of those age 65 or over.
