= Gerlinger =

Gerlinger is a surname. Notable people with the surname include:

- Carl Gerlinger, businessperson in the U.S. state of Oregon, nephew of George Gerlinger
- Christoph Gerlinger, German internet entrepreneur and venture capitalist
- George T. Gerlinger, lumber and railroad businessperson in Oregon, son of Louis Gerlinger
- Irene Hazard Gerlinger, first female regent of the University of Oregon, wife of George Gerlinger
- Louis Gerlinger Sr., lumber and railroad businessperson in Oregon

== See also ==
- Gerlinger Hall on the University of Oregon campus
