= Little Luckiamute River =

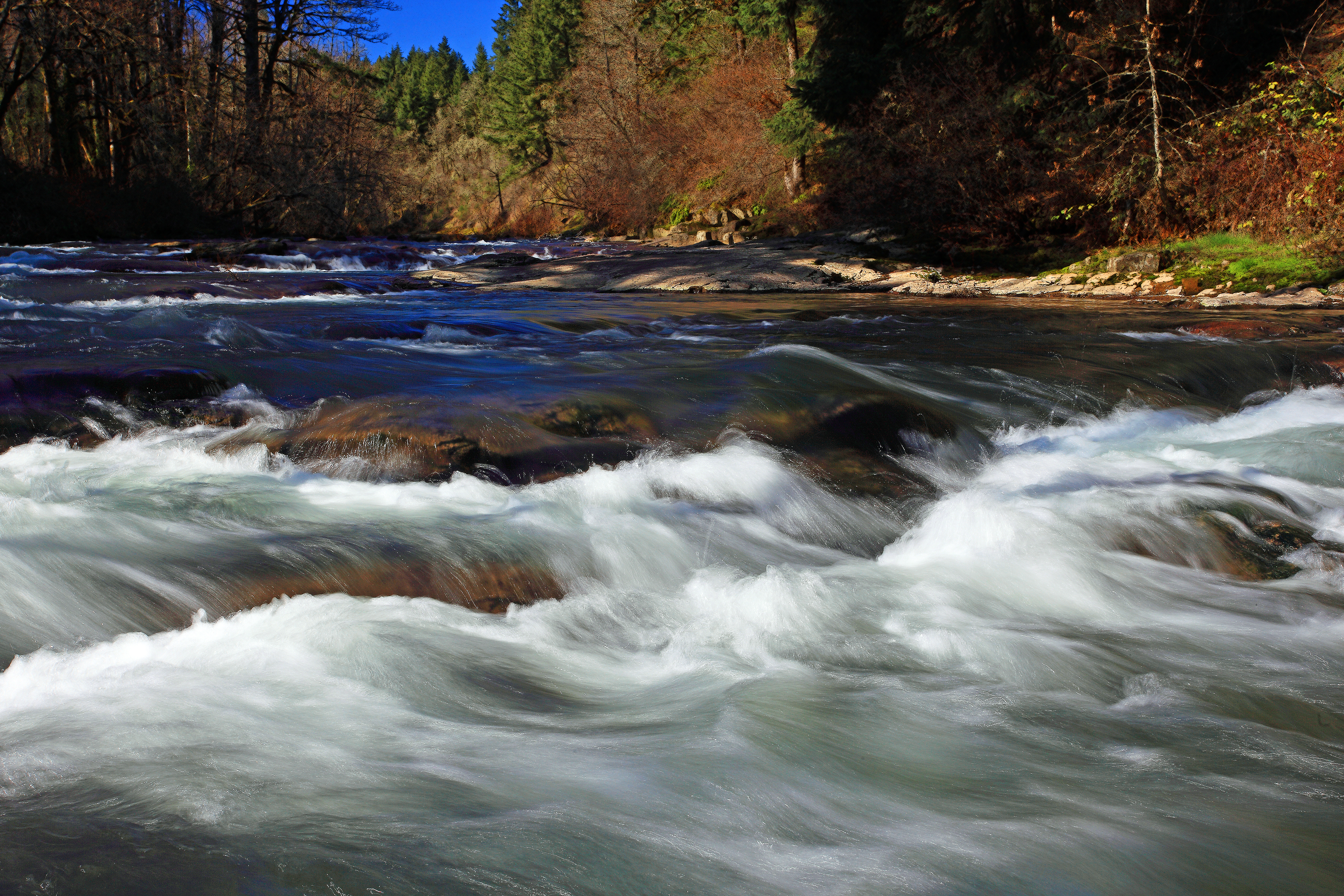
- Rapids on the Little Luckiamute River

- Location of the mouth of the Little Luckiamute River in Oregon
- Etymology: Native American but of unknown meaning

Location
- Country: United States
- State: Oregon
- County: Polk

Physical characteristics
- Source: Central Oregon Coast Range
  - location: near Fanno Peak
  - coordinates: 44°52′45″N 123°37′37″W
  - elevation: 2,869 ft (874 m)
- Mouth: Luckiamute River
  - location: about 4 miles (6 km) upstream of Sarah Helmick State Recreation Site
  - coordinates: 44°47′28″N 123°17′17″W
  - elevation: 203 ft (62 m)
- Length: 24 mi (39 km)
- Basin size: 54 sq mi (140 km^{2})
- Discharge
  - location: Helmick State Recreation Site, 13.5 miles (21.7 km) from the mouth

The Little Luckiamute River is a stream in Polk County in the U.S. state of Oregon. It rises in the Central Oregon Coast Range near Fanno Peak and joins the Luckiamute River about 4 miles (6 km) upstream of the Sarah Helmick State Recreation Site southwest of Monmouth.

Flowing generally east from its source near Fanno Peak, the river parallels Fanno Ridge, which is to the right. Lost Creek enters from the left at a rapids, and Camp Creek enters from the left 20.6 miles (33.2 km) from the mouth. About 0.5 miles (0.80 km) further on, the river passes over a waterfall. Approaching the unincorporated community of Black Rock, Little Luckiamute River receives Black Rock Creek from the left at river mile (RM) 17 or river kilometer (RK) 27. For several miles starting at Black Rock, the George T. Gerlinger Experimental Forest is on the river's left. Sam's Creek enters from the left about 1 mile (1.6 km) downstream of Black Rock.

Gerlinger County Park is on the right at RM 15 (RK 24). Dutch Creek enters from the left and Berry Creek from the right before the river reaches Falls City Falls and Falls City about 13 miles (21 km) from the mouth. At the falls, the river plunges 25 to 35 feet (7.6 to 10.7 m) into a gorge within a city park. Turning southeast, the river receives Waymire Creek from the left, then Teal Creek from the right, then passes under Oregon Route 223 at about RM 8 (RK 13). Fern Creek enters from the left just beyond Route 223, and Cooper Creek enters from the left about 1.5 miles (2.4 km) from the mouth. The Little Luckiamute River meets the Luckiamute River about 18 miles (29 km) from the larger river's confluence with the Willamette River.

The upper river supports catch-and-release fishing for wild coastal cutthroat trout ranging in size from 6 to 13 inches (15 to 33 cm).

== See also ==
- List of rivers of Oregon
- List of longest streams of Oregon
