= Union Street Railroad Bridge =

Pedestrian bridge over the Willamette River in Salem, Oregon, U.S.

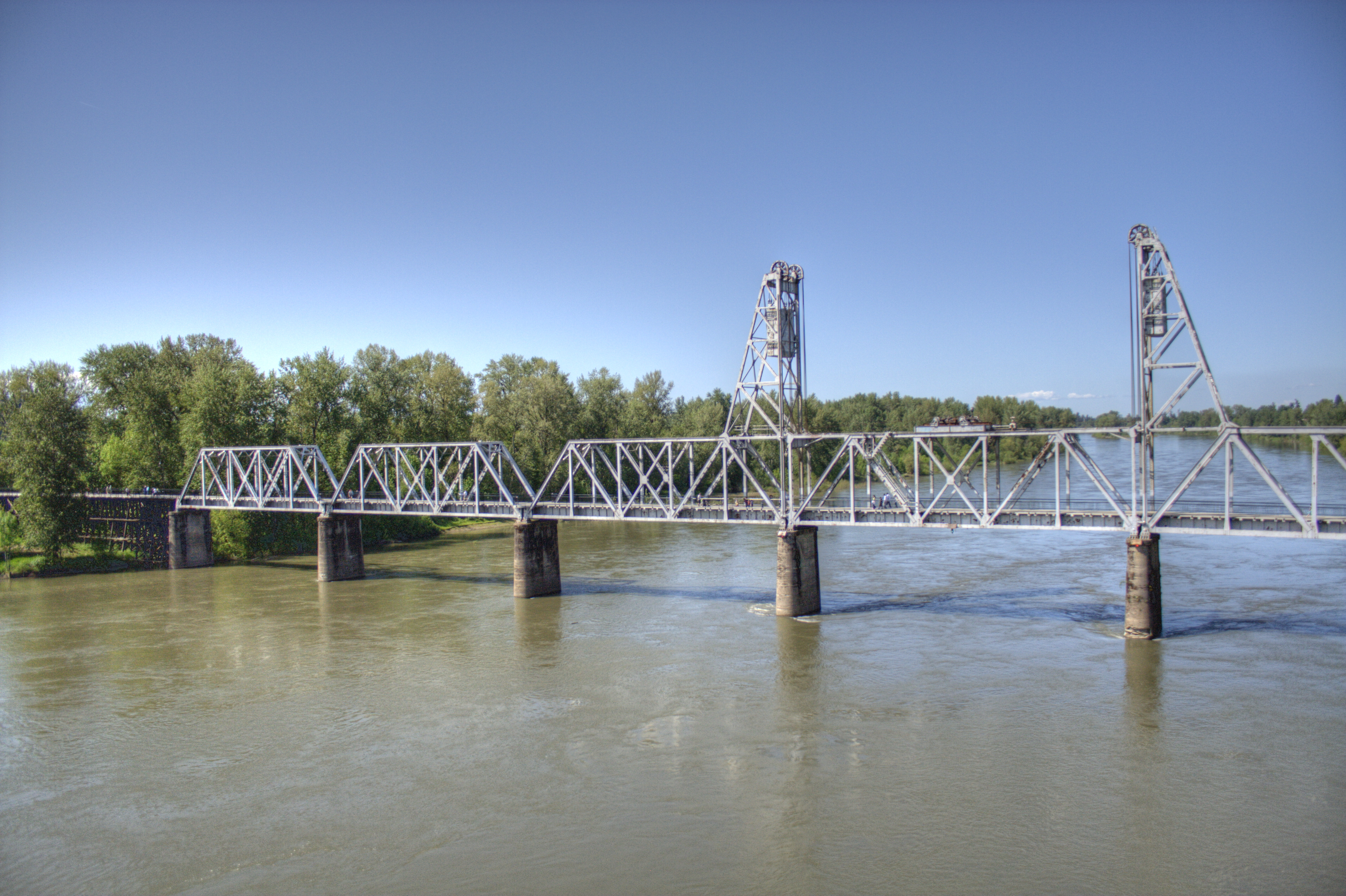
- Coordinates: 44°56′49″N 123°02′28″W
- Carries: Pedestrian traffic
- Crosses: Willamette River
- Locale: Salem, Oregon; West Salem, Oregon

Characteristics
- Design: Pratt through truss, vertical-lift bridge
- Total length: 722 feet

History
- Opened: March 15, 1913
- Union Street Railroad Bridge and Trestle
- U.S. National Register of Historic Places
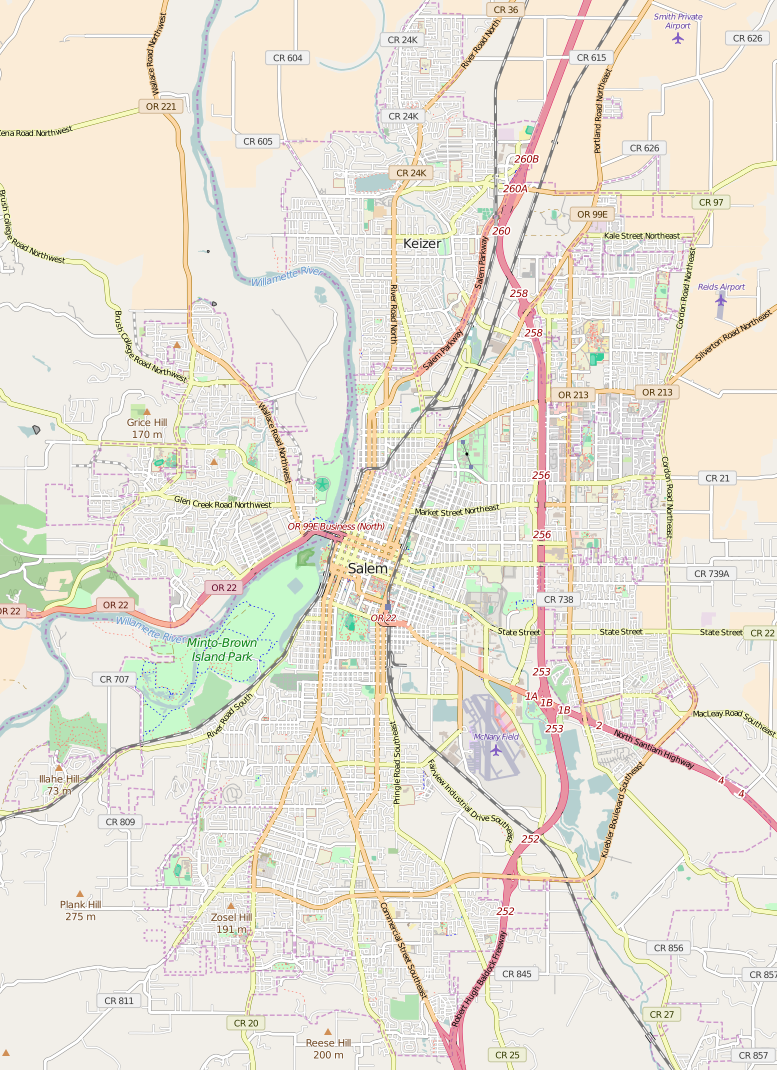
- Location within Salem OR Location within Oregon
- Location: Jct of Union St. NE and Water St. NE, Salem, Oregon
- Coordinates: 44°56′48.9″N 123°2′28.2″W
- Built: 1913
- Architect: Waddell & Harrington
- NRHP reference No.: 05001520
- Added to NRHP: January 11, 2006

Location
- Interactive map of Union Street Railroad Bridge

The Union Street Railroad Bridge is a vertical lift, Pratt through truss bridge that spans the Willamette River in Salem, Oregon, United States, built in 1912–13. It was last used by trains in the early 1990s and was sold for one dollar in 2003 to the City of Salem, which converted it to bicycle and pedestrian use in 2008–2009. It was added to the National Register of Historic Places in 2006.

== History ==
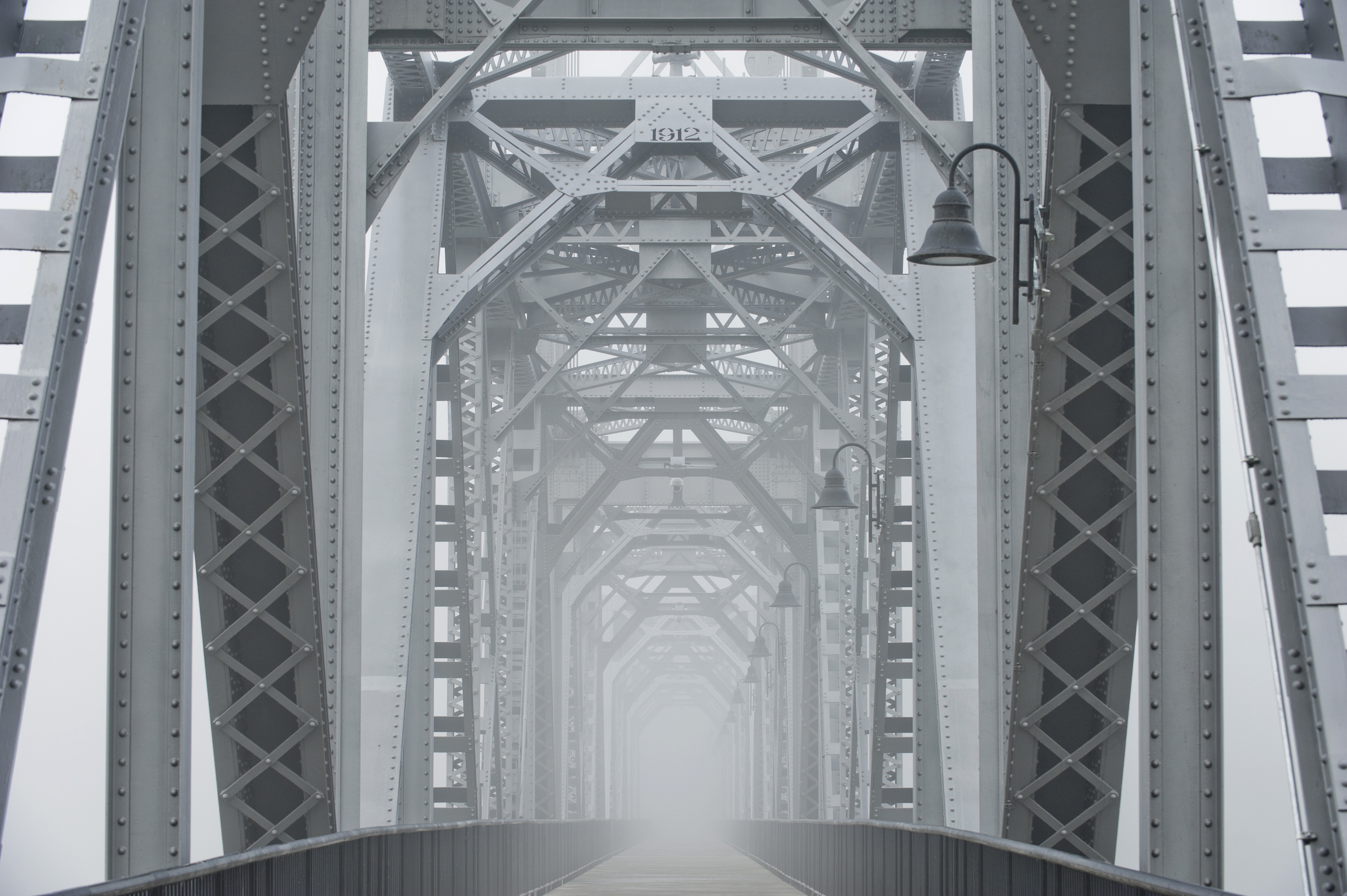
Fog surrounds the Salem Pedestrian Bridge

The bridge was engineered by Waddell & Harrington, and the lift span uses their patented lift bridge design. The bridge was built for the Salem, Falls City and Western Railway (SFC&W), which was incorporated in 1901 as a logging railroad by Louis Gerlinger and Charles K. Spaulding. After the initial construction of a line between Dallas and Falls City in 1903, the line reached the formerly separate city of West Salem in 1909; passenger service across the Willamette to Salem was provided by ferry. Southern Pacific (SP) gained full control of the Salem, Falls City and Western in 1912, and built what was then known as the Salem, Falls City & Western Railway Bridge to connect the line to the Valley Main Line in 1913. The railway was not officially purchased by Southern Pacific until 1915, at which time the SFC&W line was listed in the SP timetable as an SP branch line. Since SP had acquired the Portland, Eugene and Eastern Railway (PE&E) about the same time, and SP had planned to use the PE&E name for an electric interurban network that was to rival the Oregon Electric Railway, the bridge is also known as the Portland, Eugene & Eastern Railroad Bridge. Regular service of passenger and freight trains ended in 1945.

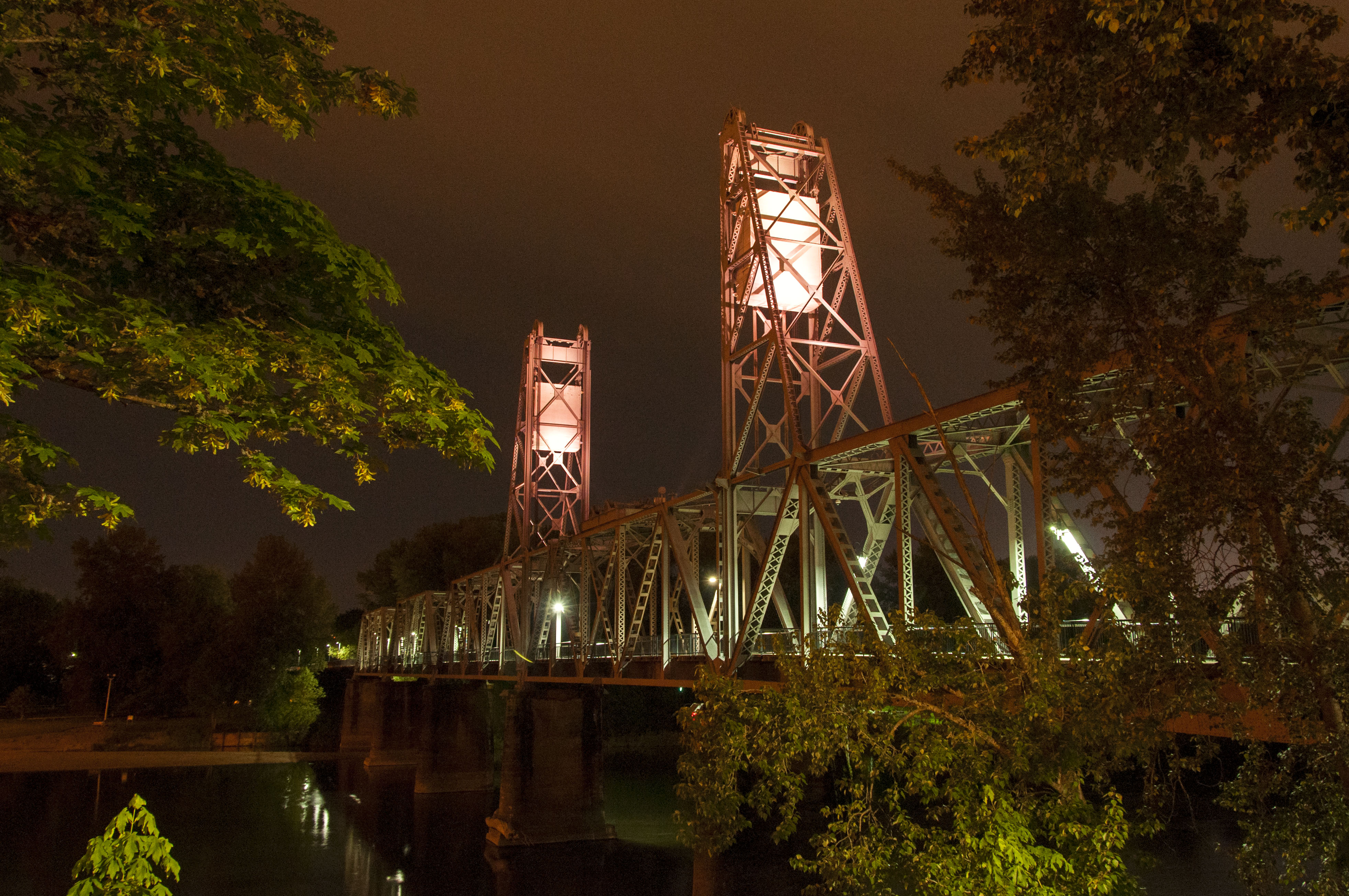
The bridge at night

The bridge has two towers that rise an additional 65 feet (20 m) above the 35-foot (11 m) tall structure of the bridge's trusses, a 134-foot-long (41 m) center lift span, and a total length of 722 feet (220 m), excluding the 850-foot (260 m) timber trestle on the western end. The bridge's five spans sit atop five concrete piers designed to rise 35 feet (11 m) above mean low water, which was intended to hold the rails 5 feet (1.5 m) above the highest possible flood waters. The lift span was designed to provide a 55-foot (17 m) clearance during high water conditions. The lift span has been inoperable since 1980, and sometime after 1980 the operator's house – which sat atop the lift span – was removed.

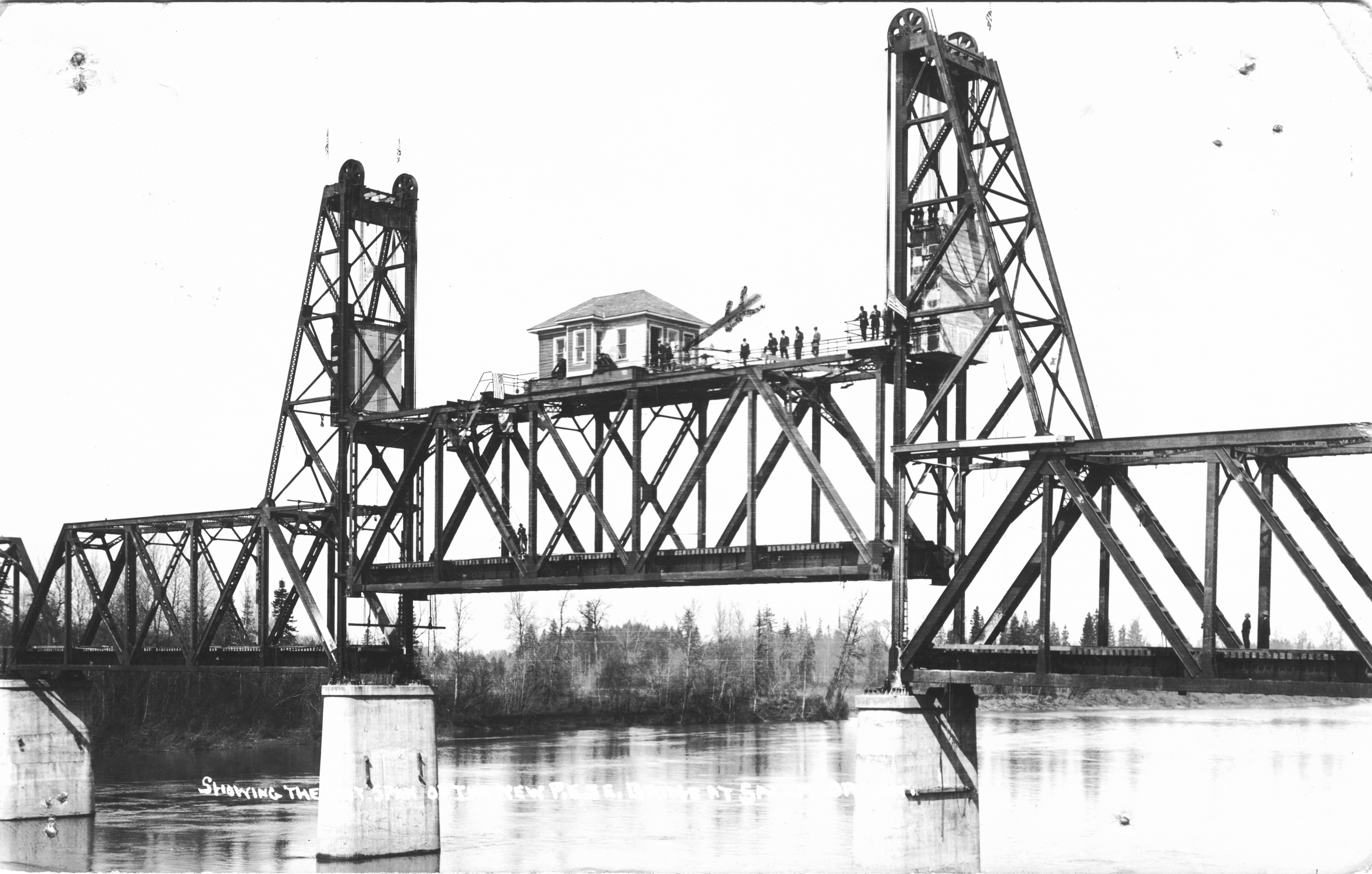
The bridge's draw span being raised. The lift mechanism has been inoperable since 1980, and the operator's house (which also housed the motors powering the lift) has been removed.

The date of the last train to cross the bridge is unknown but is believed to be in the early 1990s. The City of Salem acquired the bridge in 2003 from the Union Pacific Railroad (which absorbed Southern Pacific in 1996) for one dollar. The railroad set up a $550,000 fund for maintenance. A $3.2 million renovation and conversion project transformed it into a bicycle and pedestrian bridge linking Riverfront Park and downtown Salem on the east with Wallace Marine Park and West Salem on the west. The conversion work began in 2008 and the bridge reopened, now as pedestrian bridge, on April 18, 2009. It closed again temporarily in November, for additional work, including removal of lead-based paint, and reopened on May 15, 2010. The bridge is also engineered to allow emergency vehicle access to supplement the Marion Street and Center Street bridges.

The Union Street Railroad Bridge and Trestle (or Salem, Falls City & Western Railroad Bridge and Trestle) was added to the National Register of Historic Places on January 11, 2006.

== See also ==
- List of bridges on the National Register of Historic Places in Oregon
- List of crossings of the Willamette River
- Peter Courtney Minto Island Bridge
