= Black Rock, Oregon =

Unincorporated community in Oregon, USA

Coordinates: 44.8709501°N 123.4962175°W

Black Rock is an unincorporated community and former logging camp in Polk County, Oregon, United States. It is located about three miles west of Falls City, in the Central Oregon Coast Range on the Little Luckiamute River.

== Background ==
Louis Gerlinger came to Polk County in 1903 and bought 7,000 acres of timberland that included the area of Black Rock. In 1905, Gerlinger's son George T. Gerlinger bought an existing sawmill in nearby Dallas as well as the right-of-way to build a logging railroad into the Black Rock area. He had previously built a logging railroad from Vancouver to Yacolt in Washington.

== History and demise ==
Black Rock, founded in 1905, became the western terminus of the Salem, Falls City and Western Railway (later the Southern Pacific Railroad's Falls City branchline), which hauled timber into Dallas. The locale was probably named for an exposed ledge of black shale. Black Rock post office was established in 1906, with Louis Gerlinger, Jr. as the first postmaster. Some people who worked in the Black Rock area lived there, while others came from Falls City or Dallas. As the town grew, it eventually had three stores, a drug store, a barber shop, a restaurant, two saloons, a one-room schoolhouse, bunkhouses and cookhouses for single men, living quarters for families, and a train depot. The town of Black Rock was platted in 1910 by Charles K. Spaulding, with 22 blocks and lettered and numbered streets. High population estimates vary from 600 to 1500.

Black Rock grew quickly between 1905 and 1913, as lumber companies located in the area to access the vast stands of Douglas fir and other timber of western Polk County. In 1910, beside the Gerlingers' Dallas Lumber Company, three other companies—Great Western Lumber Company, Falls City Lumber Company, and Charles K. Spaulding Lumber Company—operated in Black Rock. The Jay S. Hamilton Lumber Company was operating in Black Rock in 1915.

By 1913, the area's timber resources were already being depleted and as the lumber companies began to move out, the town began a steady decline. The post office closed in 1943, and Black Rock and the 19,000 acres surrounding it were incorporated into the U.S. tree farm system. Part of the tree farm burned in 1945 but it was replanted. By 1960, the town only had a log dump and a security guard. The railroad was abandoned in 1960, and logs were hauled to the mills using trucks; at some point the railroad tracks were removed. Although the USGS classifies Black Rock as a populated place, today there is nothing at the former townsite, which is entirely forested except for two mill ponds.

== Mountain biking ==
The former George T. Gerlinger State Forest is nearby—it is now the site of a popular mountain biking area managed jointly by the Black Rock Mountain Bike Association and the Oregon Department of Forestry. The Black Rock trails are the first sanctioned freeride area in the state.

== See also ==
- Valsetz, Oregon, another former Polk County logging company town
