= Carl Gerlinger =

American businessperson

Carl Gerlinger, Sr. was an American businessperson in the U.S. state of Oregon in the early 20th century.

A cousin of notable lumberman George T. Gerlinger, Carl was born in on March 28, 1878, to George and Matline Gerlinger in Neuwiller-les-Saverne, Alsace-Lorraine Germany. He was raised in France. In 1901, Carl went to the US as an engineer aboard a Hamburg-American Line ship. When it docked in Tacoma, Washington, Carl was taken to the Tacoma Hospital suffering from malaria. Louis Gerlinger, Sr., Carl's uncle, persuaded Carl to make his home in Portland, Oregon. There he worked for the Oregon-Washington Railroad & Navigation Co. (OWR&N). In 1902, Carl moved to Dallas, Oregon, to work for the Salem, Falls City and Western Railway (SFC&W) owned by his uncle Louis.

In 1908, while working in the roundhouse on a steam boiler, it exploded. His brother August Gerlinger was killed and several others were injured. Carl lost his left arm. He also temporarily lost his sight. He was laid up for over a year until he regained his sight. He decided to concentrate on inventing. Among his inventions are the oil distributor, oil retort and spark arrestors for locomotives.

Working for the Southern Pacific Railroad (which had purchased the SFC&W once owned by Carl's uncle), he was quickly promoted and was the general foreman of the shops at Dallas).

In 1918, Gerlinger, a gifted machinist and business leader, invested his savings into Ed Biddlle's Dallas Iron Works. A year later it became Dallas Machine & Locomotive Works which employed a dozen men. Business expanded quickly from manufacturing logging and railroad equipment. In 1920 they rebuilt nine locomotives and twelve in 1923.

Next came the Gerlinger Carrier, a machine that could load and unload lumber. This business led to the Gerlinger Carrier Company, a manufacturer of both straddle carriers and forklift trucks. The company eventually merged with Towmotor and Caterpillar Tractor in the 1950s.

In the 1970s, the business returned to family control. Today, the carriers are manufactured in nearby Salem, by G.C.C., Inc., which is controlled by one of Carl's descendants, and run by Mark Lyman and Ron Lyman.
