= Salem Hospital (Oregon) =

- Salem Health Hospitals & Clinics

Geography
- Location: Salem, Oregon, United States
- Coordinates: 44.933°N 123.034°W

Organization
- Type: Community

Services
- Emergency department: Level II trauma center
- Beds: 644

History
- Founded: 1896

Links
- Website: www.salemhealth.org
- Lists: Hospitals in Oregon

Salem Hospital is part of Salem Health Hospitals & Clinics, a not-for-profit institution, located in Salem, Oregon, United States. Founded in 1896, the non-profit hospital has over 640 beds. The community hospital is the largest private employer in Salem and the only hospital in the city.

== History ==
In 1896, Salem General Hospital was incorporated at the Glen Oak Orphanage. Situated on 10 acres (4.0 ha) of land donated to the orphanage by the Oregon Children's Aid Society, the hospital opened a school of nursing with the first class graduating in 1899. The original building for Salem General burned in 1920, with a new building completed the following year. Salem General expanded in 1926 and 1953.

In 1916, Frank B. Wedel and his wife started the Deaconess Home and Hospital in a former hotel on Winter Street. Started with four nurses, the hospital grew and was expanded in 1920, becoming Deaconess Hospital. The hospital was expanded again in 1924 to 1925, with administration staying in the Wedel family home until it was converted into a community hospital and renamed as Salem Memorial Hospital. In 1969, Salem Memorial Hospital and Salem General Hospital merged to create Salem Hospital.

Salem Hospital purchased Valley Community Hospital (now known as West Valley Hospital) in neighboring Dallas in 1999. In 1999, the hospital was downgraded from a Level II to a Level III trauma center by the State of Oregon. In 2001, the hospital finalized plans to expand and replace the 1950s building. Beginning in 2001, the hospital was allowed to treat some Level II patients that would normally be transferred to another hospital under the state's four-tier trauma care rating system. A new emergency room was completed in December 2003. In 2003, a new five-story building was added to house infant, child, and pregnancy services. In October 2006, construction on a new seven-story, 347,700-square-foot (32,300 m^{2}) building began. Completed in May 2009, the $219 million tower replaced approximately half of the existing hospital beds and included three skybridges to the other buildings at the hospital campus. Salem Hospital received five-star ratings from HealthGrades in 2007 for cholecystectomy, total-hip replacement, back and neck surgery, coronary bypass surgery, gastrointestinal surgery, coronary interventional procedures, treatment of heart attack, and spinal surgery, as well as an award for cardiac and gastrointestinal surgeries. The hospital's laboratory became accredited in 2007 by the College of American Pathologists' Laboratory Accreditation Program Accreditation Committee. In 2008, the hospital added the da Vinci System, a robotic surgery system, with a grant from the Salem Hospital Foundation. Salem Hospital was elevated to a Level II trauma center from Level III in December 2010.

In 2020, the hospital began a 150-bed expansion to the Patient Care Tower on the former site of the emergency department parking lot. The expansion was completed in 2022. The project introduced new inpatient beds, expanded diagnostic and treatment service areas, outpatient and retail services, and a chapel.

== Details ==
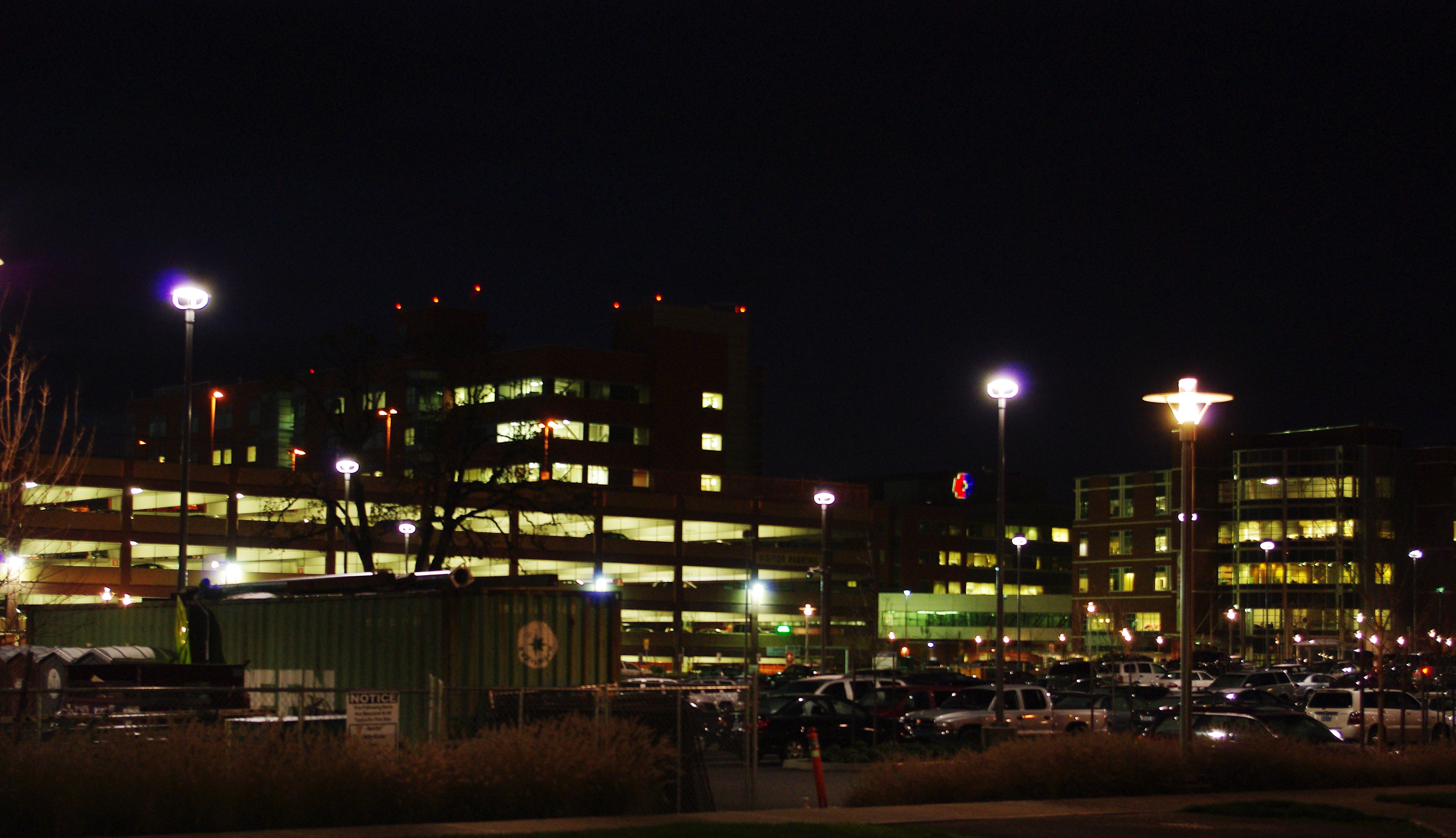
Campus at night

Salem Hospital serves an area of over 400,000 people and is licensed for 644 acute-care beds, as of 2025. Service is provided to a three-county area that includes Marion, Yamhill, and Polk counties. The hospital is Salem's largest private employer with 6,400 employees. Emergency department visits totaled 115,479, surgeries performed totaled 16,167, and 3,024 babies were delivered at the hospital in 2024.

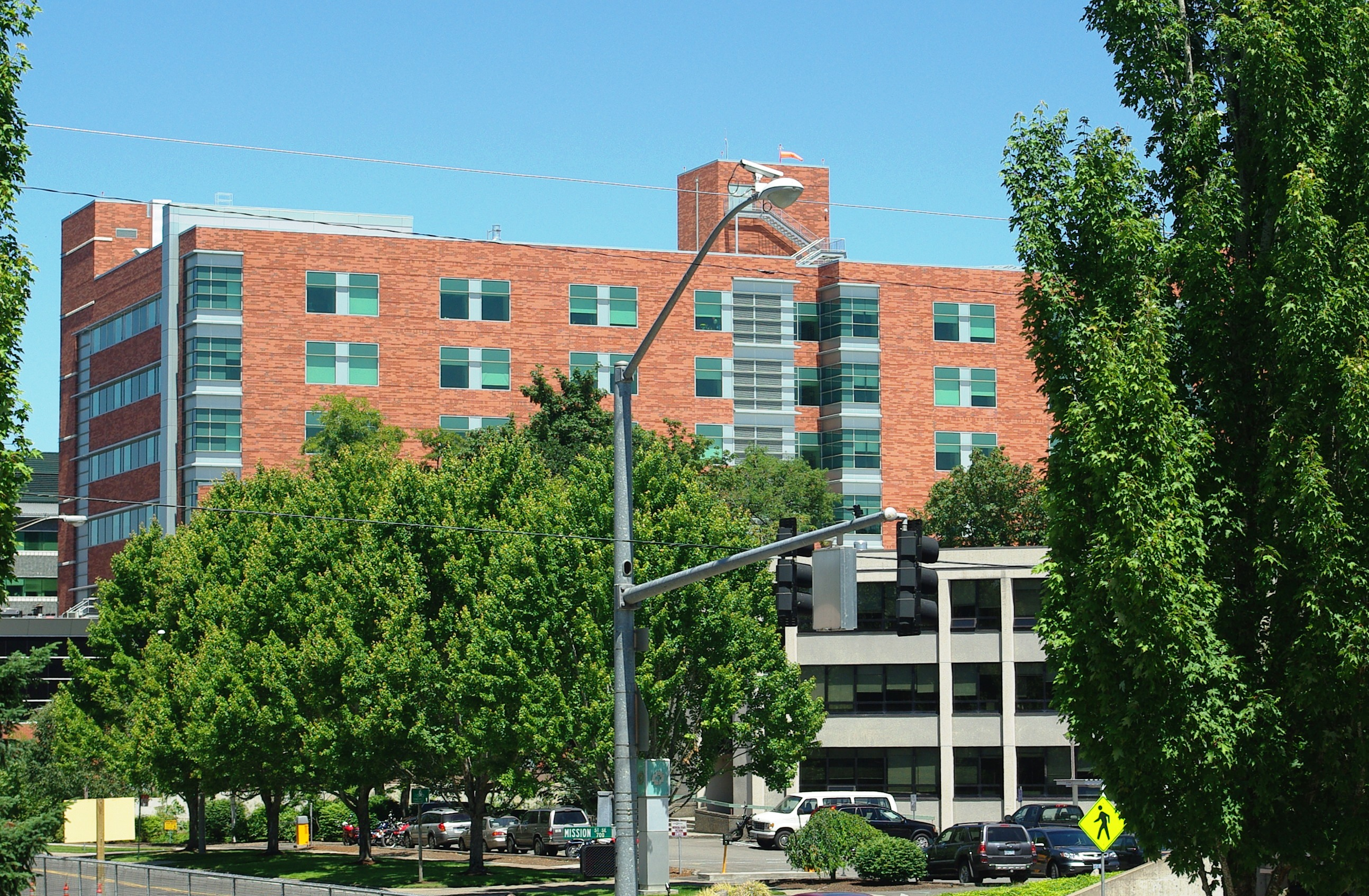
Patient care tower finished in 2008

Facilities at the hospital include one of a few psychiatric regional care centers in Oregon. The emergency department is the busiest on the west coast between Los Angeles and the Canadian border, with an average of 316 patients treated each day. As of 2018, their services included a cancer center, a surgery center, imaging, rehabilitation, and a center for sleep disorders.

Management is performed by the board of trustees, a fifteen-member volunteer group. As of 2018, the hospital operated a rehabilitation center, an urgent care center, an MRI facility, and an outpatient center. The Oregon Department of Human Services has designated the hospital as a Level II trauma center.

Salem Hospital was certified by the Magnet Recognition Program for nurses in 2010, received recertification in July 2015, and is currently one of five Oregon hospitals with this status.

== Salem Hospital Heliport ==
The Salem Hospital Heliport (FAA LID: OG37) is a private heliport located on the hospital's Patient Care Tower (Building A).

The previous helipad was eliminated when the parking structure on which it was sited was torn down in 2006 to make way for construction. During the interim period, helicopters landed in the Willamette University's McCulloch Stadium located in Bush's Pasture Park south of the hospital.
