= Falls City High School =

Falls City High School may refer to:

- Falls City High School (Nebraska), United States; see Falls City, Nebraska#Education
- Falls City High School (Oregon), United States
- Falls City High School (Texas), United States
