= Roger Carroll =

American radio DJ and TV announcer (1928–2019)

- Born: Kolman Carroll Rutkin; October 6, 1928; Baltimore, Maryland, U.S.
- Died: July 30, 2019 (aged 90); Long Beach, California, U.S.
- Occupations: Disc jockey; television announcer
- Years active: 1948-2019
- Spouse: Beverly Jean Dolby (m. 1955; died 2011)
- Children: 5

Kolman Carroll Rutkin (October 6, 1928 – July 30, 2019), better known as Roger Carroll, was an American radio disc jockey and television announcer.

== Career ==
=== 1940s ===
Carroll became an announcer at WFMD in Frederick, Maryland, in 1945 (age of 15). In 1948, he was hired as a staff announcer for the ABC Network, Hollywood, at age 18; Carroll was at that time the youngest announcer in the network's history. He served as an announcer for 10 years with the network.

=== 1950s ===
By December 1958, Carroll had become the host of what a Los Angeles Times columnist described as "KABC's most outstanding music show". He had begun work at KABC as a substitute disc jockey. In 1959 he was hired as a disk jockey and radio show host at KMPC radio in Hollywood. His program, "The R.C. Get-Together," ran until 1979 and was one of the most popular radio shows in Southern California. His work for KMPC included game-day remote broadcasts from stadiums when the Los Angeles Rams and the California Angels played home games.

=== 1960s ===
He began his television career as the announcer for The Smothers Brothers Comedy Hour (1967–1969). He continued with the brothers in the 1988 and 1989 versions of that program as well as on The Smothers Brothers Show in 1970 and again in 1975. He went on to be the announcer for The Leslie Uggams Show (1969) and The Glen Campbell Goodtime Hour (1969).

=== 1970s ===
Carroll was the announcer for The Pearl Bailey Show (1971), The Bobby Darin Show (1973), The Tony Orlando and Dawn Rainbow Hour (1976), and The Redd Foxx Comedy Hour (1977-1978). In 1979, he left KMPC to become a vice president of Golden West Broadcasting.

=== 1980s ===
In 1981, Carroll was co-owner of KWIP, an AM radio station in Dallas, Oregon. He also owned Best Sounds in Town Inc./Roger Carroll Productions, which created and produced special programs, commercials and jingles.
