= Irene Hazard Gerlinger =

American fundraiser

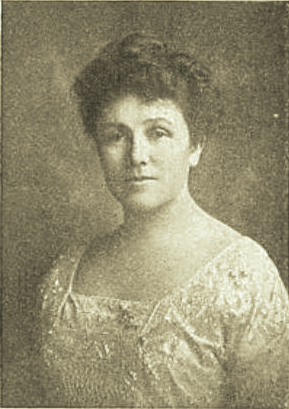
Gerlinger in 1925

Irene Strang Hazard Gerlinger (December 3, 1876 – April 5, 1960) was an American fundraiser and the first woman on the University of Oregon Board of Regents. She is the namesake for Gerlinger Hall on the University of Oregon campus.

Irene Hazard, daughter of James Rider Hazard and Evangeline Strang, was born in 1876 in Orange County, New York, on her family's farm. Her father had a large cattle ranch in Arizona, where Gerlinger spent some of her early childhood. She died in 1960 after being a resident of Oregon for 24 years. She described herself as "a simple housewife, the 'cruel' mother-in-law to three fine young sons-in-law, grandmother to four young descendants, and a volunteer public servant by way of an avocation."

== Family life and education ==
Irene Hazard married George T. Gerlinger at the end of her senior year of college on October 21, 1903. In 1910 or 1911, she moved to Dallas, Oregon, where her husband supervised the Willamette Valley Lumber Company. They had three daughters, Georgiana, Irene, and Jean. She did not like the Dallas schools, so she hired a live-in governess for her daughters. Not wanting them to be in seclusion, she later opened a private kindergarten in their home and invited other girls to attend.

Gerlinger was educated in public and private schools in California, and earned a Bachelor of Arts degree from the University of California, and a Master of Arts degree from the University of Oregon. Describing finishing her degree she stated, "Then one summer I took my three little girls with a nurse for the baby, and went down to California to finish my work so that I'd receive my degree from the university there…We stayed in the Kappa house, and so in 1922 I was graduated, instead of in 1904 as I should have been."

Gerlinger founded the Dallas Public Library in 1905 in a room of the old Fireman's Hall, and in 1912, a building was constructed with local funds. The library was supported by Andrew Carnegie, who helped build 1,679 public libraries in the United States between 1883 and 1929.

In 1935, she founded Republican Women of Oregon Inc. with Ella Allen Scott. It became the Oregon chapter of Pro America, National Federation of Republican Women and Gerlinger was its first president.

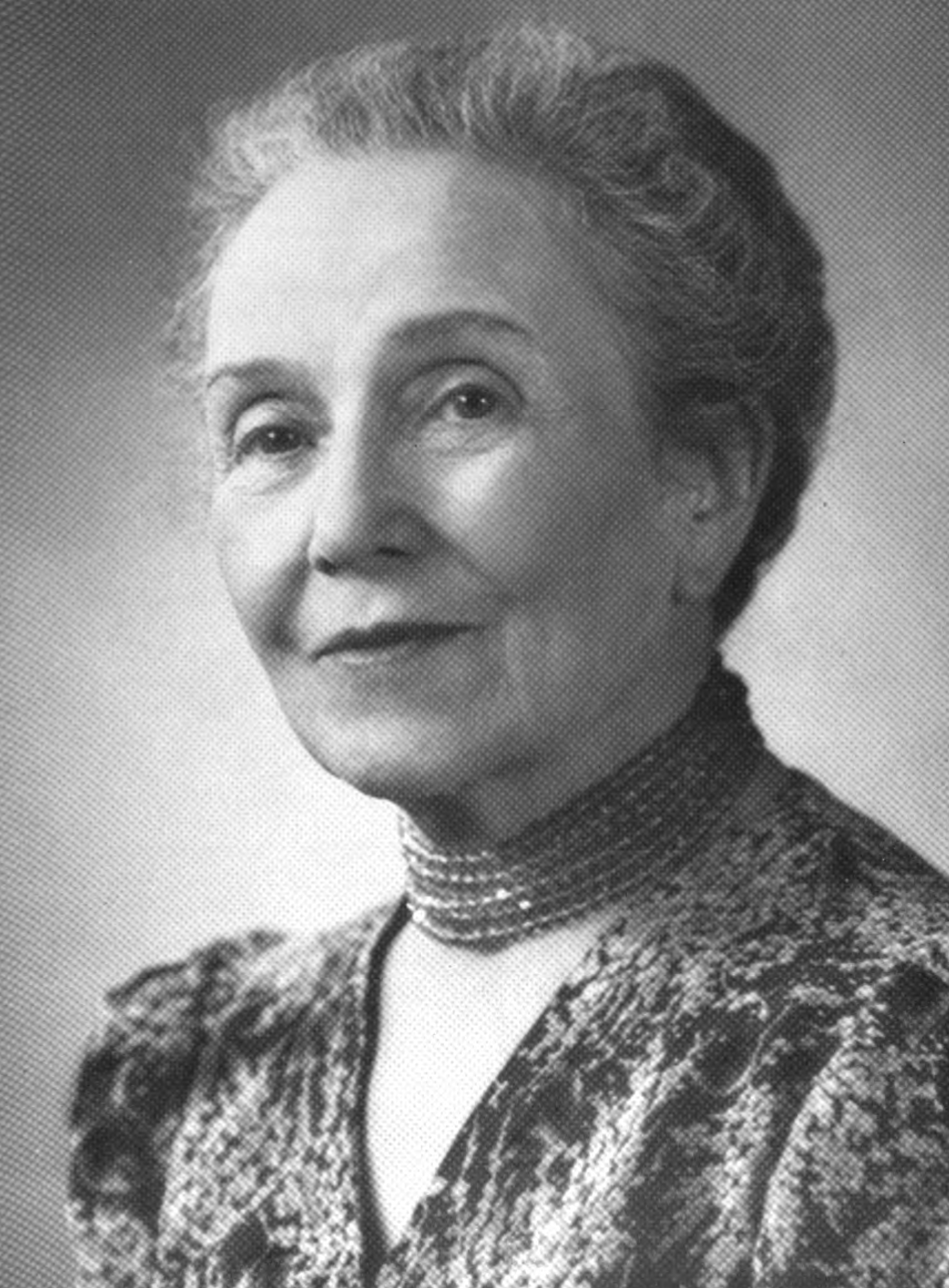
Gerlinger in 1960

She died of a massive intestinal hemorrhage in San Francisco, California in 1960, aged 83.

== University of Oregon ==
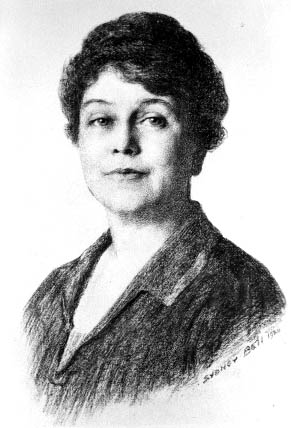
Black-and-white image of a drawing of Irene Gerlinger, the first female regent at the University of Oregon, drawn in 1928 by an artist named Sydney. The last name of the artist is illegible. The University of Oregon's Gerlinger Hall and Gerlinger Annex are named for her.

Gerlinger was the first female Regent of the University of Oregon from 1914–1929 and Vice-President of the board when it was abolished in 1929. She was active in the building and financing of Doernbecher Children's Hospital, being Chairman of the Medical School committee. She helped the University of Oregon secure the Women's Building (Gerlinger Hall), Prince Campbell Memorial Art Museum (Jordan Schnitzer Museum of Art), women's dormitories and other buildings on campus.

=== Gerlinger Hall ===
Gerlinger stated in 1957, "I was shocked to learn that University of Oregon graduates were ineligible to join the American Association of University Women because we didn't have a women's building on the campus." Gerlinger Hall was completed in 1921. In 1929 the building was officially named Gerlinger Hall after being called the Women's Memorial Hall, Women's Building and Women's Hall because of the immense impact Gerlinger had in taking this project off the ground and seeing it to fruition with the help of so many alumni, students and donors.

The building was a symbol of the voice of women on campus. Gerlinger was the voice of the women on campus during the creation of this building. She describes the great living room in the hall, "The cultivation of the pleasant amenities and graces of life is a very valuable part of any person's education."
