= KWIP =

Radio station in Dallas–Salem, Oregon

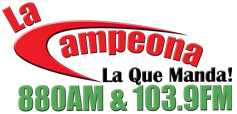
- Dallas, Oregon; United States
- Broadcast area: Salem, Oregon, Portland, Oregon
- Frequency: 880 kHz
- Branding: La Campeona

Programming
- Format: Regional Mexican

Ownership
- Owner: Jupiter Communications Corporation

History
- First air date: April 15, 1955 (as KPLK at 1460)
- Former call signs: KPLK (1955–1962); KROW (1962–1980)
- Former frequencies: 1460 kHz (1955–1983)

Technical information
- Licensing authority: FCC
- Facility ID: 32965
- Class: B
- Power: 5,000 watts day; 1,000 watts night
- Transmitter coordinates: 44°55′45″N 123°17′22″W
- Translator: 103.9 K280GS (Salem)

Links
- Public license information: Public file; LMS
- Webcast: Listen live
- Website: kwip.com

KWIP (880 AM) is a radio station broadcasting a regional Mexican format. Licensed to Dallas, Oregon, United States, it serves the Salem, Oregon, area. The station is owned by Jupiter Communications Corporation.

== History ==
KWIP once had the call letters KROW. KWIP was the call sign held by a Merced, California, station operating on 1580 kHz (1950s and 1960s)

In the early 1980s, KWIP was owned by radio and TV announcer Roger Carroll.

== Translator ==
KWIP is also broadcast on the following translator:

Call sign	Frequency	City of license	FID	ERP (W)	Class	FCC info
K280GS	103.9 FM	Salem, Oregon	24673	100	D	LMS
