= The Leslie Uggams Show =

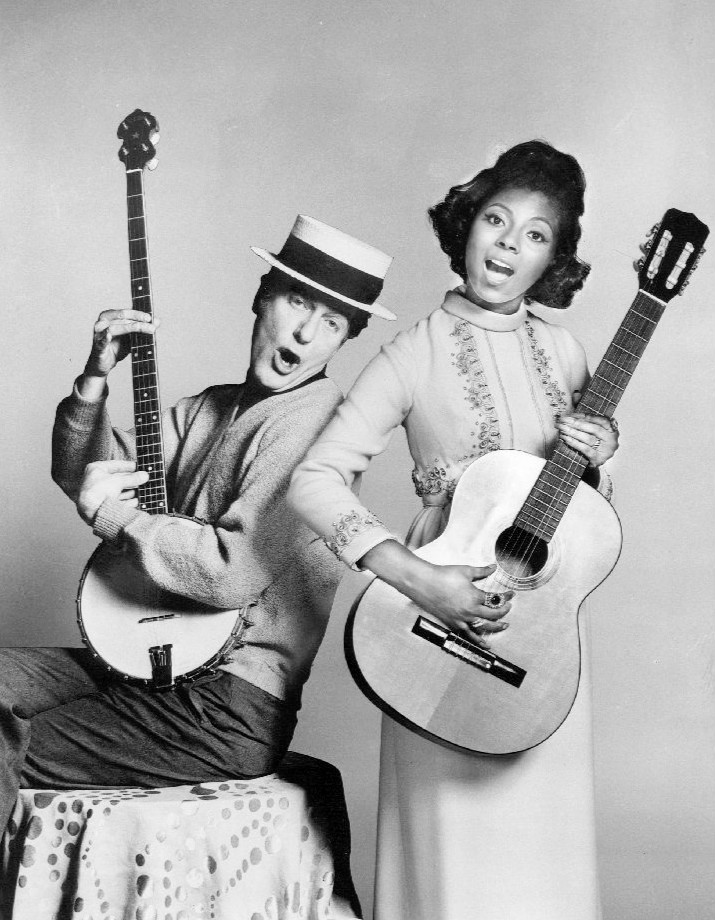
- Dick Van Dyke as the guest for the show's premiere in 1969
- Genre: Variety
- Written by: Ernest Chambers; Frank Shaw
- Presented by: Leslie Uggams
- Starring: Johnny Brown; Lincoln Kilpatrick
- Narrated by: Roger Carroll
- Country of origin: United States
- Original language: English
- No. of seasons: 1
- No. of episodes: 10

Production
- Producers: Ernest Chambers; David Winters
- Running time: 45–48 minutes

Original release
- Network: CBS
- Release: September 28 – December 14, 1969

The Leslie Uggams Show is an American variety television series starring actress/singer Leslie Uggams. The series aired on CBS as part of its 1969 fall lineup.

== Synopsis ==
The Leslie Uggams Show gave Uggams, who had first come to wide public notice as a singer on the early 1960s hit Sing Along With Mitch, her own program to showcase herself and other black performers; unlike other early variety programs which were hosted by black entertainers but featured a large number of whites in the cast, only one of Uggams' regulars, comedian Dennis Allen, was white. A recurring feature of the program was the ongoing series of sketches entitled "Sugar Hill", which dealt with the lives of middle class black family in a large American city, which included young Alison Mills Newman, author of Francisco.

The series was given the challenging time slot of 9:00 P.M. on Sunday nights which in the early to mid 60's had proven to be unsuccessful for such variety shows as The Judy Garland Show and The Garry Moore Show since the chief competition for both programs was the venerable western series Bonanza. When Moore's show was cancelled in January, 1967, The Smothers Brothers Comedy Hour premiered and immediately became a huge hit for CBS managing to more than hold its own against Bonanza. However, in the spring of 1969, CBS pulled that variety series due to its controversial content and scheduled Uggams's show for the 1969-1970 fall season. Scheduled opposite Bonanza, which was still a massive hit for NBC, and a series of fairly recent (by the standards of the era) movies on ABC, The Leslie Uggams Show had difficulty developing an audience and was cancelled in December 1969. The Glen Campbell Goodtime Hour took over the Sunday night slot on CBS starting on 21 December 1969, with Hee Haw taking over Campbell's vacated Wednesday night slot.

== Cast ==
- Leslie Uggams.....Host
- Dennis Allen.....Regular
- Johnny Brown.....Regular
- Lillian Hayman.....Regular
- Lincoln Kilpatrick....Regular
- Alison Mills.Newman....Regular
- Roger Carroll.....Announcer
- Nelson Riddle.....Orchestra Leader

== Episodes ==
| No. | Title | Original release date |
|---|---|---|
| 1 | "Episode 1" | September 28, 1969 |
Guest stars: David Frye, Dick Van Dyke, Marc Copage, Sly & the Family Stone
| 2 | "Episode 2" | October 5, 1969 |
Guest stars: Glenn Ash, Don Knotts
| 3 | "Episode 3" | October 12, 1969 |
Guest stars: John Banner, Robert Clary, Bob Crane, Larry Hovis, Werner Klemperer
| 4 | "Episode 4" | October 26, 1969 |
Guest stars: Kaye Ballard, Raymond Burr, The Turtles
| 5 | "Episode 5" | November 2, 1969 |
Guest stars: Jim Nabors, Smith, Jackie Vernon
| 6 | "Episode 6" | November 9, 1969 |
Guest stars: Bob Denver, David Frye, Robert Guillaume, Johnny Mathis
| 7 | "Episode 7" | November 16, 1969 |
Guest stars: Ken Berry, David Frye, Dick Van Dyke
| 8 | "Episode 8" | November 23, 1969 |
Guest stars: Sammy Davis, Jr., Bobby Goldsboro, Mitch Miller, Sammy Shore
| 9 | "Episode 9" | December 7, 1969 |
Guest stars: Ruth Buzzi, Mike Connors, Stevie Wonder
| 10 | "Episode 10" | December 14, 1969 |
Guest stars: Glenn Ash, Kaye Ballard, The Temptations
