= Salem, Falls City and Western Railway =

The Salem, Falls City and Western Railway (SFC&W) was an American railroad based in Polk County, Oregon that ran between Salem and Black Rock via Dallas and Falls City.

== History ==
In October, 1901, Louis Gerlinger, Sr. and Charles K. Spaulding announced plans to build a railroad from the Willamette River at Salem to the mouth of the Siletz River on the Oregon Coast, a distance of 65 miles (105 km). The railroad was used for transporting timber. On May 29, 1903, the first train departed from Dallas for Falls City. At the end of June, passenger trains began regularly scheduled trips. At the time, the cost of a one way trip of 9 miles (14 km), with a duration of approximately 40 minutes, was 35 cents.

By 1905, the line was extended further west to Black Rock, where it branched into several lines further out into the timber farms. In 1907, the Southern Pacific (SP) railroad company assumed operation of the Dallas—Black Rock portion of the line. The line reached its original intended terminus, near the banks of the Willamette River, in 1909. SP owned railroad tracks on the other side of the river, and used ferries to transport passengers and goods across the river to its Salem Branch.

SP gained full control of the Salem, Falls City and Western in 1912. SP built what was then known as the Salem, Falls City & Western Railway Bridge or Union Street Railroad Bridge to connect the line to the Valley Main Line in 1913 at Lemrock. SP purchased the railway officially in 1915, and designated it Falls City Branch.

SP provided kerosene-powered rail cars known as McKeen cars. The rail cars were nicknamed "The Skunk" because of the smell from the exhaust fumes; these cars were discontinued by 1930.

Its initial purpose and primary revenue source was logging. Logs from Black Rock were dumped into the Willamette River at varying points, including Winona and Holman. By 1949, a log dump had been installed. At Eola, gravel was dredged from the river and loaded into gondola cars for railroad use. Logging declined following World War II, and what demand remained was converted to truck transport.

The line between Falls City and Black Rock was abandoned in 1960 and removed two years later. By the mid-1960s, trips to Falls City were infrequent. Between West Salem and Gerlinger, the line was rarely used after 1964 and was essentially abandoned in the 1970s. In 1965, the section between Dallas and Falls City was cut back to Buman, where a 3-mile spur led to a lime quarry. Despite the infrequent use of the line for shipping, SP was not allowed to abandon this portion of the branch until 1968. In the early 1970s, the line was further reduced to a point about 1.5 miles west of Dallas.

In Salem, the section of track along Union Street between Lemrock and Willamette River bridge was removed in 1964. SP continued to access the bridge and industries in West Salem via Front and Trade streets until 1980 when these tracks were also removed. At this time, Burlington Northern took over the switching operations in West Salem. Rail service into West Salem was discontinued in the early 1990s.

== Legacy ==
A 5-mile segment between the former SP Westside line between Gerlinger and Dallas is all that remains of the Falls City branch. The line is owned by Union Pacific and leased and operated by the Portland & Western Railroad as the Dallas District.

== See also ==
- Union Street Railroad Bridge

== Sources ==
- Austin, Ed, and Tom Dill, The Southern Pacific in Oregon, 1987, Pacific Fast Mail, pp. 171–4
- "SPFallsCityBranch". www.brian894x4.com.
- "Salem (Oregon) Online History - West Salem". www.salemhistory.net.
