= West Valley Hospital (Oregon) =

- Salem Hospital
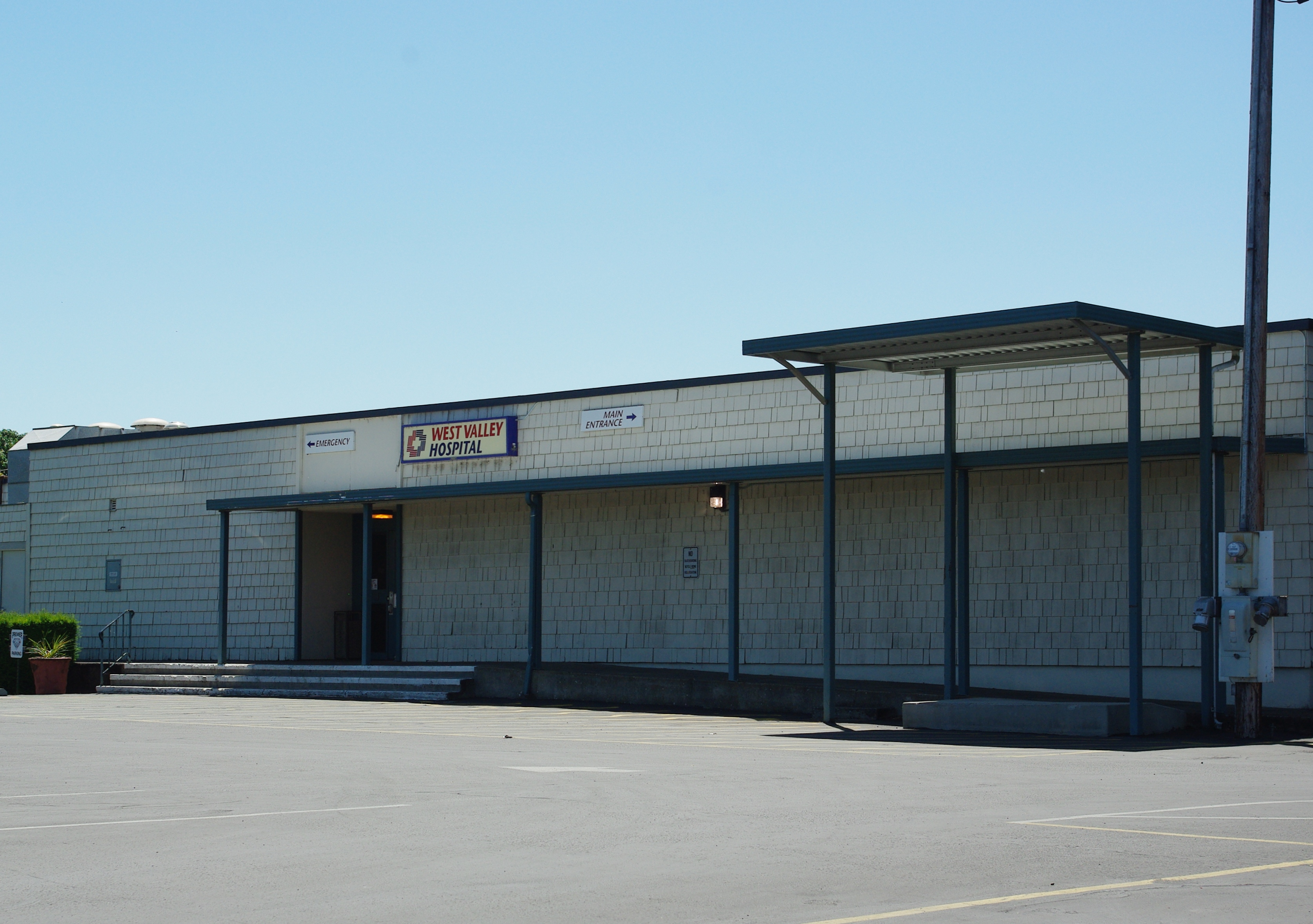
- West Valley Hospital in 2011

Geography
- Location: 525 SE Washington Street, Dallas, Oregon, United States
- Coordinates: 44.919°N 123.310°W

Organization
- Care system: Medicare/Medicaid
- Type: Acute Care

Services
- Beds: 6

Links
- Website: www.salemhealth.org/services/west-valley-hospital
- Lists: Hospitals in Oregon

West Valley Hospital (WVH) is a 6-bed medical facility in Dallas, Oregon. Opened in 1907 as Dallas Hospital, it is operated by Salem Health, which also operates Salem Hospital. WVH is the only hospital in Polk County.

== History ==
Started as Dallas Hospital in 1907, it moved in 1909 to Oak Street. In 1912, four local doctors raised money to build a two-storey, $13,000 hospital that opened in 1914 on Uglow Street. Mark Hatfield was born at the hospital in 1922, as was Johnnie Ray in 1927. In 1964, Tony Branson bought the facility with a silent partner before selling it to California-based Sedco Northwest, Inc. in 1971.

Sedco built a new hospital, opening it in 1973 as Polk Community Hospital. Sedco later merged into Hyatt Medical Enterprises, which sold what was then known as Valley Community Hospital to American Medical International (AMI) in 1981. AMI sold the facility in 1983 to Nu-Med, which in turn sold it in 1994 to a local non-profit, VCH. The local non-profit sold the hospital for $2.4 million in 1999 to Salem Hospital, with the non-profit then leasing it back. Salem Hospital remodeled the facility in 2000, which was then renamed as West Valley Hospital in July 2002 as it joined what became Salem Health when it bought the entire hospital. The hospital regained use of the city's aquatic center for physical therapy in 2003. A new wing was added in 2003 at a cost of $1.4 million.

A doctor who worked as a contract emergency department physician at the hospital was investigated by the Federal Bureau of Investigation in 2005 due to claims he used an unapproved Botox substitute at his own clinics. In September 2012, the hospital finished renovations on the operating rooms. The hospital faced losing its designation as a critical access hospital in 2013.

== Details ==
WVH is licensed for 15 beds, but as of 2014 only had 6 beds available. Services at the critical access hospital include an emergency department, surgical, ophthalmology, imaging, gynecology, lab services, orthopedics, urology, and podiatry, among others. For 2013, the hospital had a total of 173 discharges, with 536 patient days, and 12,074 emergency department visits. The hospital does not have inpatient surgeries nor a maternity department. For 2013, the hospital had $20 million for net patient revenue, earned $987,000 in net income, and provided $2.1 million in charity care.

== See also ==
- List of hospitals in Oregon
