= Willamette Industries =

American forest products company

Willamette Industries, Inc.
- Traded as: NASDAQ:WMTT
- Founded: 1906
- Defunct: June 14, 2002
- Fate: Hostile buyout by Weyerhaeuser
- Successor: Weyerhaeuser
- Headquarters: Portland, Oregon

Willamette Industries, Inc. was a Fortune 500 forest products company based in Portland, Oregon, United States. In 2002, the lumber and paper company was purchased by competitor Weyerhaeuser of Federal Way, Washington in a hostile buyout and merged into Weyerhaeuser's existing operations.

== History ==
Willamette Industries was founded in Dallas, Oregon, in 1906 as the Willamette Valley Lumber Company. Louis Gerlinger, Sr. was president of the new company and H.L. Pittock, vice president. George T. Gerlinger served as secretary and manager while F.W. Leadbetter was treasurer. George Cone served as director and mill superintendent.

In 1967, this company and several others merged to become Willamette Industries. The next year the company went public. The company continued to grow through acquisitions, including purchasing Bohemia, Inc. in 1991, which at the time was one of the largest lumber companies in Oregon. By 1999 it had grown to 14,000 employees with $4 billion in annual revenues and more than 100 facilities across the United States.

== Products ==
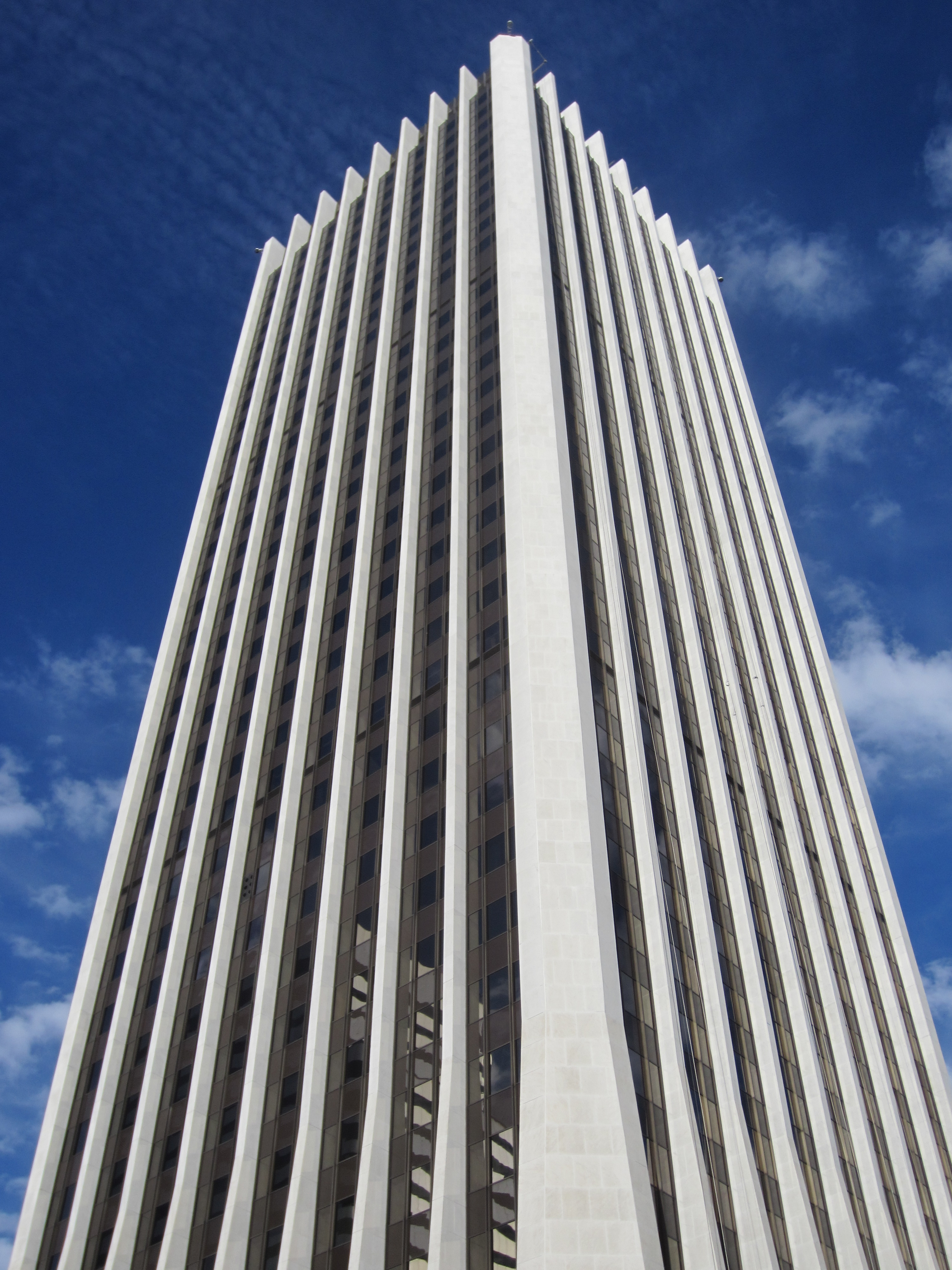
Location of company headquarters prior to buyout

Willamette had three operating divisions. A brown paper division produced bag paper, paper bags, cardboard, and liner board. The white paper segment made hardwood market pulp, business forms, and uncoated free sheets. The building materials unit manufactured lumber, plywood, fiberboard, particleboard, and laminated veneer lumber products. Customers were located in the US, Asia, and Europe.

== Environment ==
In July 2000, the company was fined a then record $11.2 million by the Environmental Protection Agency (EPA) for violations of the Clean Air Act. As part of a settlement with the EPA and the Department of Justice, Willamette also was required to spend an additional $74 million on pollution abatement at 13 factories. In May 2001, the company donated habitat to The Nature Conservancy in the form of permanent conservation easements. The total amount of land 1,740 acres (7.0 km^{2}) with a value of $1.5 million.

== Buyout ==
Beginning in 1998 Washington-based competitor Weyerhaeuser contacted Willamette Industries about combining the companies. At that time Willamette management did not entertain any of these proposals. On November 13, 2000, Weyerhaeuser began an unsolicited bid to purchase Willamette through a tender offer, for $5.3 billion in cash, plus the assumption of $1.7 billion in debt, or $48.00 a share, a 38% premium to Willamette's Friday, November 11, closing stock price. The shares in Willamette went up 32.7% on Monday, November 13.

Willamette fought this hostile take-over bid. On November 29 Weyerhaeuser upped the price to $48 a share, or $5.4 billion. Willamette rejected this offer also. On December 22, 2000, Weyerhaeuser announced that it had launched a proxy fight to oust four directors of Willamette Industries, in order to get the board to vote in its favor. The offer was extended on January 5, 2001 to February 1, and on February 1, 2001, Weyerhaeuser learned that a majority of the shareholders favored the merger, with 51% of shares outstanding tendered. Weyerhaeuser secured three of the four board seats in the proxy fight in June 2001. In October 2001, Willamette said that it was worth more: "value is in the $60-a-share range, but that they would consider an offer in the high-$50 range." Willamette sought out merger talks with another forest products company, Georgia-Pacific (GP), the largest in the world to avoid the Weyerhaeuser takeover. Willamette even talked with GP about Willamette buying the GP building materials businesses and greatly increasing Willamette's debt level. The combination with GP that was larger than all of Willamette's operations would have created a company with annual sales of around $12.5 billion. On December 13, 2001, Weyerhaeuser increased its offer to $55.00 per share, or $6.5 billion, in cash.

Finally, in January 2002, Willamette Industries agreed to be bought by Weyerhaeuser for $55.50 per share, for a total cash equity value of approximately $6.08 billion. The deal also included Weyerhaeuser's assumption of approximately $1.53 billion of Willamette debt, making the total value of the deal approximately $7.61 billion. The deal closed in March of that year, ending a four-year process.

=== Company at buyout ===
At the time of the takeover by Weyerhaeuser, Willamette was the seventh largest forest products company in world with over 90 facilities across the United States. There were foreign operations in Mexico, Ireland, and France, with the corporate headquarters in Portland, Oregon, in the Wells Fargo Center. Willamette Industries owned 1.7 million acres (6,900 km^{2}) of forest land, and Duane C. McDougall served as the last chief executive officer of the company. As of June 15, 2001 the company had $4.6 billion in annual revenues and a market value of $5.35 billion.
