= Falls City High School (Oregon) =

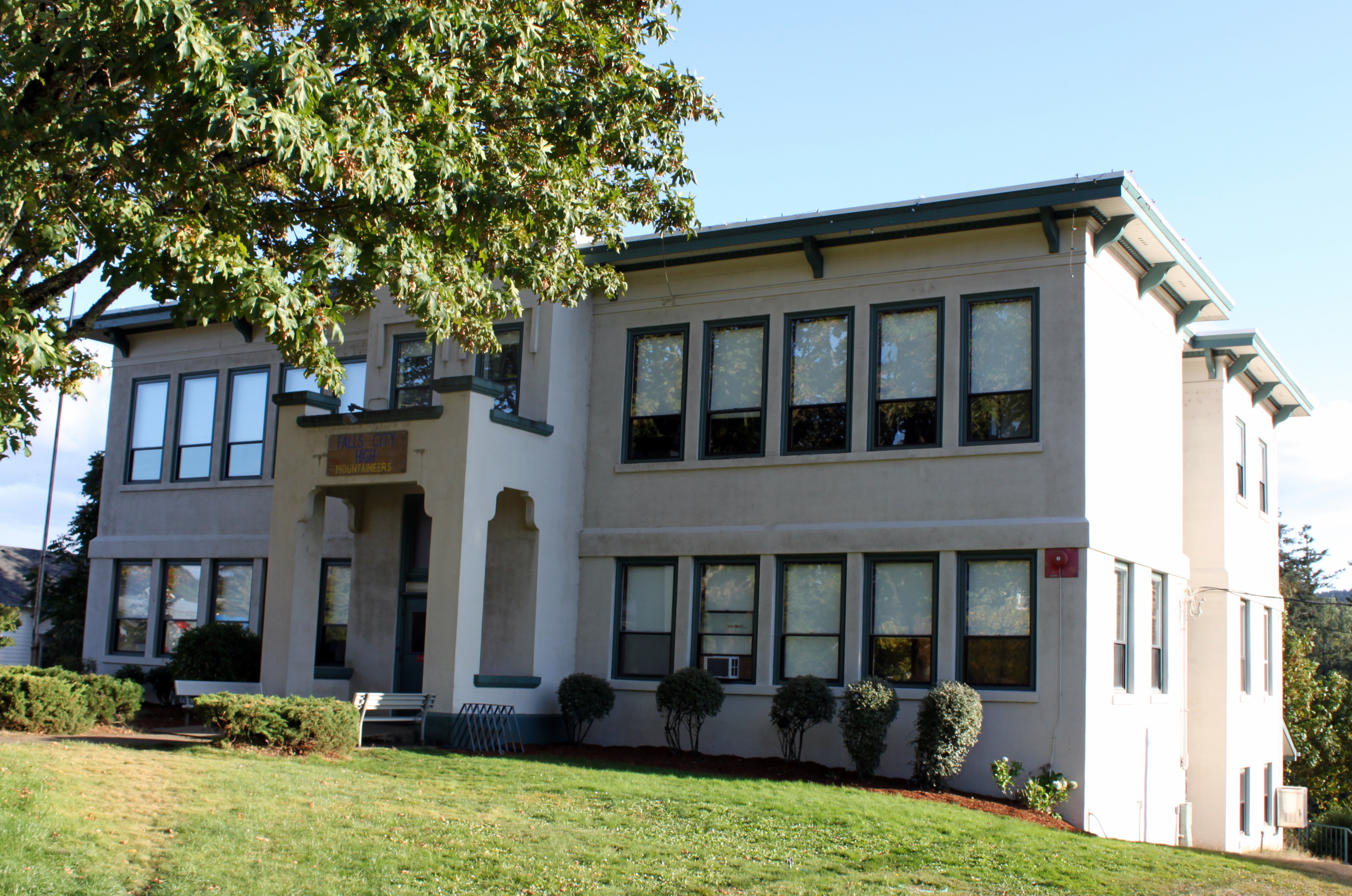

Location
- 111 N Main Street; Falls City, Polk County, Oregon 97344-9776; United States; 44.865379°N 123.429358°W

Information
- Type: Public
- School district: Falls City School District
- Superintendent: Cory Ellis
- Principal: Micke Kidd
- Teaching staff: 11
- Grades: 9-12
- Enrollment: 59 (2024–2025)
- Student to teacher ratio: 10.33
- Colors: Purple and gold
- Athletics conference: OSAA Casco League 1A-2
- Mascot: Mountaineers
- Website: https://www.fallscityschools.org/page/high-school

Falls City High School is a public high school in Falls City, Oregon, United States. It is the only high school in the Falls City School District.

== History ==
The current school building was built in 1921.

== Academics ==
In 2025, 83% of the school's seniors received their high school diploma. 2 students dropped out that year. In 2008, of 19 students, 10 graduated, 2 dropped out, 1 received a modified diploma, and 6 are still in high school.

In 2009, the school changed to a "proficiency model" as part the Race to the Top program of the Department of Education. Student grades are based on subject-area competency, instead of test scores and homework grades.
