= Sarah Helmick State Recreation Site =

State park located in Oregon, U.S.

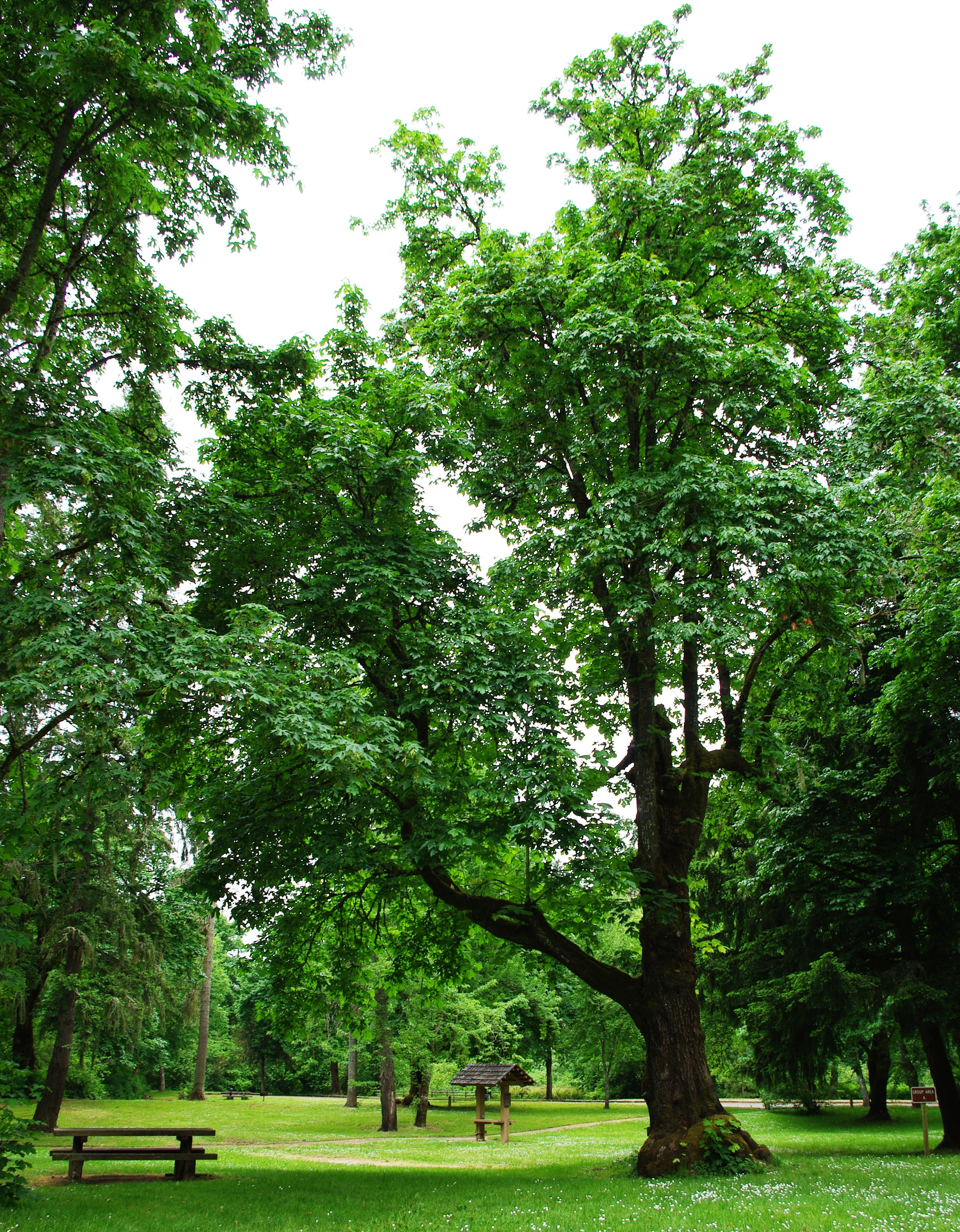
- Picnic area

- Location within Oregon Location within the United States
- Type: Public, state
- Location: Polk, County, Oregon
- Nearest city: Monmouth
- Coordinates: 44°46′54″N 123°14′16″W
- Operator: Oregon Parks and Recreation Department

Sarah Helmick State Recreation Site, also known as Helmick Park, is a state park located south of Monmouth, in Polk County, Oregon, United States. It is located on the floodplain of the Luckiamute River and is forested by Bigleaf Maple, Douglas-fir, and Black Cottonwood trees, among other varieties. The park is named for Sarah Helmick, a pioneer to Oregon in 1845 who donated the original land. Sarah Helmick State Recreation Site is the first state park established in Oregon. It was listed on the National Register of Historic Places in 2022.

== History ==
=== Establishment ===
The land for the park was the first land acquired by what was then the State Highway Commission for use as a park when Sarah Helmick donated 5.16 acres (2.09 ha) and James and Amanda Helmick donated 0.3 acres (0.12 ha) on February 15, 1922.

The park's namesake, Sarah Helmick (1823-1924), was an Oregon pioneer who settled a donation land claim which included the park land with her husband during the second half of the 1840s. The resident of Albany, Oregon gifted the original parcel of land for use as an "automobile campground."

=== Expansion ===
In 1948, 23.65 acres (95,700 m^{2}) were purchased and added to the park, followed by a gift of 1.7 acres (0.69 ha) later that same year. Currently a day-use only park, the park used to have overnight camping facilities.

== See also ==
- List of Oregon state parks
