= Dallas, Oregon =

- City
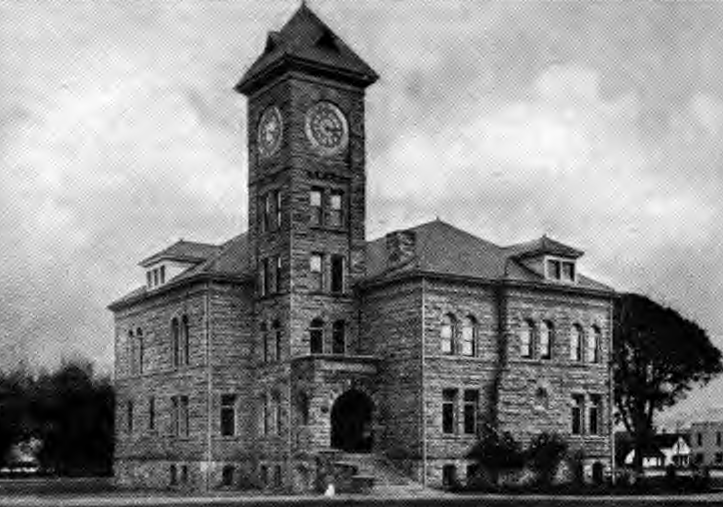
- Polk County Courthouse

- Location in Polk County, Oregon
- Coordinates: 44°55′20″N 123°18′47″W
- Country: United States
- State: Oregon
- County: Polk
- Incorporated: 1874

Government
  - Mayor: Rich Slack

Area
  - Total: 4.91 sq mi (12.71 km^{2})
  - Land: 4.91 sq mi (12.71 km^{2})
  - Water: 0 sq mi (0.00 km^{2})
- Elevation: 322 ft (98 m)

Population (2020)
  - Total: 16,854
  - Density: 3,435.4/sq mi (1,326.42/km^{2})
- Time zone: UTC-8 (Pacific)
  - Summer (DST): UTC-7 (Pacific)
- ZIP code: 97338
- Area codes: 503 and 971
- FIPS code: 41-17700
- GNIS feature ID: 2410287
- Website: www.dallasor.gov

Dallas is a city in and the county seat of Polk County, Oregon, United States. The population was 16,854 at the 2020 census.

Dallas is along Rickreall Creek, about 15 miles (24 km) west of Salem, at an elevation of 325 feet (99 m) above sea level. It is part of the Salem Metropolitan Statistical Area.

== History ==
Pioneers in the 1840s started the settlement on the north side of Rickreall Creek. It was originally named "Cynthian" or "Cynthiana". A 1947 Itemizer-Observer article states: "[T]he town was called Cynthiana after Cynthiana, Ky., so named by Mrs. Thos. Lovelady." According to the county historical society in 1987, Mrs. Thomas J. Lovelady named the new settlement after her hometown of Cynthiana, Kentucky.

Another source claims that Cynthia Ann, wife of early pioneer Jesse Applegate, named the settlement. But they lived in the Salt Creek area of northern Polk County and, according to the 1850 Federal Census, she was not living in Polk County then.

The town post office was established in 1852. In 1856, the town was moved more than a mile south because of an inadequate supply of water.

Cynthiana competed with Independence to be selected as the county seat. Its residents raised $17,000 in order to have a branch of the narrow gauge railroad constructed to their town, which secured them the honor and related economic stimulus. The line was built from 1878–80.

=== Name change ===
Town leaders believed a more sturdy sounding name was needed for a county seat. Since George Mifflin Dallas was vice-president under James K. Polk, for whom the county was named, they named it "Dallas".

Dallas was incorporated as a town in 1874 and as a city in 1901.

=== Gerlinger family ===
After Louis Gerlinger Sr. incorporated the Salem, Falls City and Western Railway Company late in October 1901, he announced plans to build a railroad from the Willamette River at Salem to the mouth of the Siletz River on the Oregon Coast, a distance of 65 miles (105 km).

In 1902, Louis's son George T. Gerlinger organized a group of investors to build related railroad lines in the area. On May 29, 1903, the first train ran from Dallas to Falls City. At the end of June, passenger trains began regularly scheduled, daily trips to and from Dallas and Falls City; the 9-mile (14 km), one-way trip cost 35 cents and took 40 minutes.

Willamette Industries was founded in Dallas in 1906. At that time the company name was Willamette Valley Lumber Company. Louis Gerlinger Sr. was president of the new company and H. L. Pittock, vice president. George T. Gerlinger served as secretary and manager, and F. W. Leadbetter was treasurer. George Cone served as director and mill superintendent. In 1967, Willamette Valley Lumber and several others merged to become Willamette Industries.

In the early 21st century, this and other local businesses were taken over by others from outside, which eventually affected the local economy. In March 2002, Willamette Industries was officially acquired by Weyerhaeuser Company in a hostile takeover. In early 2009, Weyerhaeuser's Mill formally closed the Dallas operation. Similarly, Gerlinger Carrier Company in Dallas was taken over by Towmotor.

== Geography ==
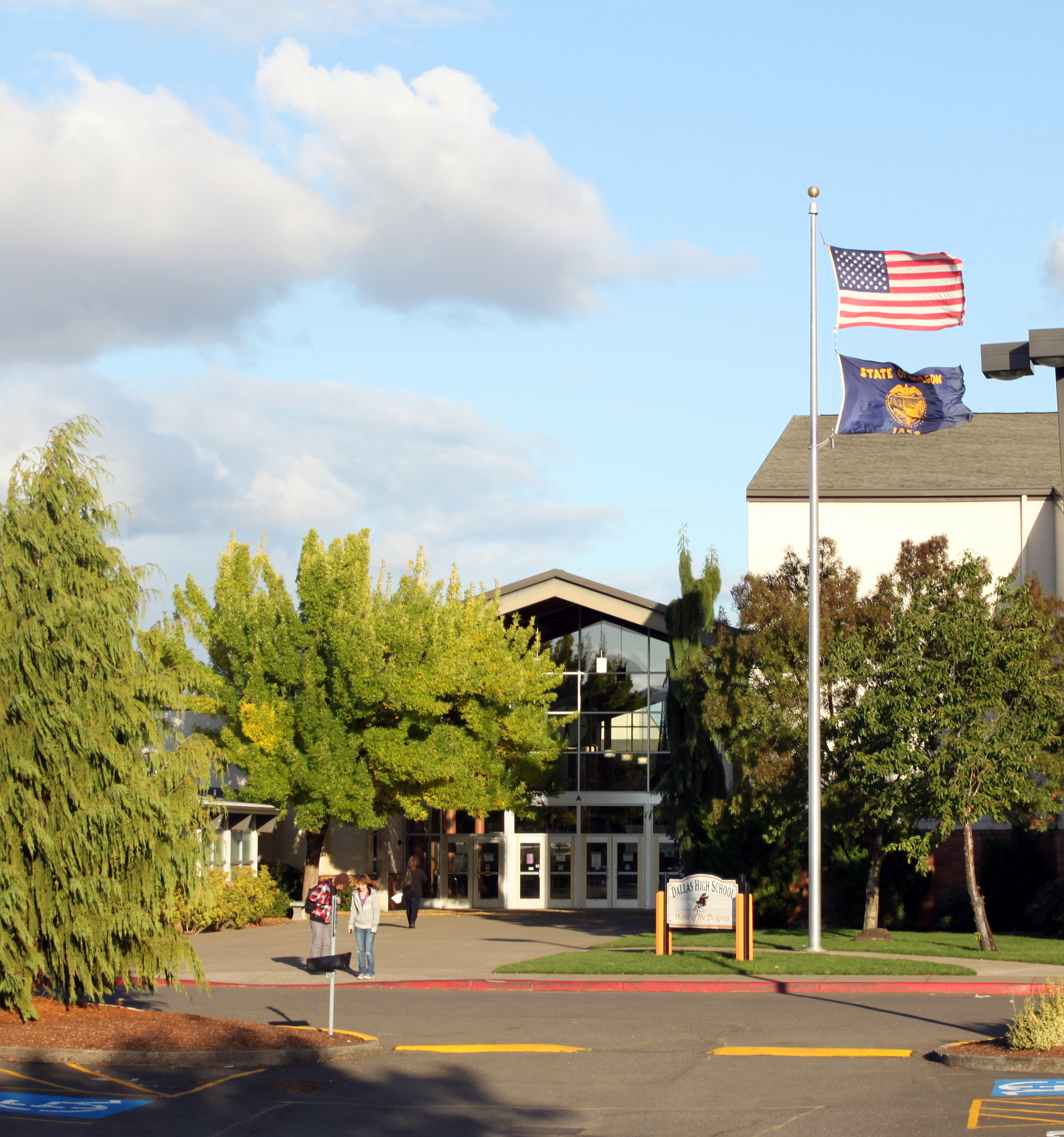
Dallas High School

According to the United States Census Bureau, the city has a total area of 4.81 square miles (12.46 km^{2}), all of it land.

=== Climate ===
Dallas has a Mediterranean climate (Köppen Csb) with warm to very warm, dry summers with cool mornings, and cold, rainy winters. Occasionally frigid weather will reach the Willamette Valley due to very cold continental air from Canada being driven over the Cascades by a low-pressure system to the south, as occurred repeatedly in January 1950 when temperatures reached as low as −11 °F (−23.9 °C) on January 31, 1950, and 68.0 inches (173 cm) of snow fell. However, snowfall is generally very rare, with an annual mean of 4.9 inches (12 cm) and a median of zero.

Rainfall is generally heavy during the winter months, averaging over 6.50 inches (170 mm) from November to February, when rain falls on around seventeen days in an average month, and on all but one day in November 1983. The wettest month has however been December 1996 with 21.93 inches (557.0 mm) and the wettest "rain year" from July 1973 to June 1974 with 80.01 inches (2,032.3 mm). As with most of Oregon, the driest "rain year" was from July 1976 to June 1977 and saw only 23.78 inches (604.0 mm).

Spring arrives slowly with pleasant afternoon temperatures and less heavy rainfall by April, although showers are common until into June. High summer in July and August is very warm in the afternoon and generally dry, with no rain falling for 79 days, between June 23 – September 9, 1967, which saw the hottest month on record in August 1967 where the mean maximum was 92.1 °F (33.4 °C). Low humidity and pleasant mornings make this season comfortable, although airflows from the hot continent can bring spells of sweltering and arid weather, with 106 °F (41.1 °C) reached on July 19, 1956, and on August 8, 1981. On average, eighteen afternoons will top 90 °F (32.2 °C) but only two can expect to reach 100 °F (37.8 °C), while 62 mornings fall below freezing, but only two spells (in January–February 1950 and December 1972) have ever seen temperatures as low as 0 °F (−17.8 °C).

Climate data for Dallas, Oregon (1991–2020 normals, extremes 1935–present)
Month	Jan	Feb	Mar	Apr	May	Jun	Jul	Aug	Sep	Oct	Nov	Dec	Year
Record high °F (°C)	65 (18)	71 (22)	77 (25)	88 (31)	98 (37)	111 (44)	106 (41)	106 (41)	104 (40)	98 (37)	76 (24)	65 (18)	111 (44)
Mean daily maximum °F (°C)	46.6 (8.1)	50.6 (10.3)	55.8 (13.2)	60.7 (15.9)	68.3 (20.2)	73.2 (22.9)	82.5 (28.1)	83.1 (28.4)	77.6 (25.3)	64.5 (18.1)	52.1 (11.2)	45.5 (7.5)	63.4 (17.4)
Daily mean °F (°C)	40.9 (4.9)	43.1 (6.2)	46.7 (8.2)	50.4 (10.2)	56.7 (13.7)	61.0 (16.1)	67.3 (19.6)	67.6 (19.8)	63.4 (17.4)	54.2 (12.3)	45.3 (7.4)	40.1 (4.5)	53.1 (11.7)
Mean daily minimum °F (°C)	35.2 (1.8)	35.6 (2.0)	37.6 (3.1)	40.2 (4.6)	45.1 (7.3)	48.8 (9.3)	52.1 (11.2)	52.1 (11.2)	49.1 (9.5)	43.8 (6.6)	38.4 (3.6)	34.8 (1.6)	42.7 (5.9)
Record low °F (°C)	−11 (−24)	−2 (−19)	10 (−12)	24 (−4)	27 (−3)	31 (−1)	31 (−1)	34 (1)	30 (−1)	22 (−6)	9 (−13)	−2 (−19)	−11 (−24)
Average precipitation inches (mm)	7.48 (190)	5.56 (141)	5.08 (129)	3.71 (94)	2.36 (60)	1.49 (38)	0.31 (7.9)	0.47 (12)	1.60 (41)	3.80 (97)	7.18 (182)	8.74 (222)	47.78 (1,214)
Source: NOAA

== Demographics ==
Historical population
Census	Pop.	Note	%±
1880	670		—
1890	848		26.6%
1900	1,271		49.9%
1910	2,124		67.1%
1920	2,701		27.2%
1930	2,975		10.1%
1940	3,579		20.3%
1950	4,793		33.9%
1960	5,072		5.8%
1970	6,361		25.4%
1980	8,530		34.1%
1990	9,422		10.5%
2000	12,459		32.2%
2010	14,583		17.0%
2020	16,854		15.6%

=== 2020 census ===
As of the 2020 census, Dallas had a population of 16,854. The median age was 43.1 years. 21.6% of residents were under the age of 18 and 24.9% of residents were 65 years of age or older. For every 100 females there were 90.8 males, and for every 100 females age 18 and over there were 87.2 males age 18 and over.

100.0% of residents lived in urban areas, while 0% lived in rural areas.

There were 6,648 households in Dallas, of which 28.3% had children under the age of 18 living in them. Of all households, 51.1% were married-couple households, 13.7% were households with a male householder and no spouse or partner present, and 27.9% were households with a female householder and no spouse or partner present. About 25.3% of all households were made up of individuals and 15.0% had someone living alone who was 65 years of age or older.

There were 6,890 housing units, of which 3.5% were vacant. Among occupied housing units, 67.9% were owner-occupied and 32.1% were renter-occupied. The homeowner vacancy rate was 1.7% and the rental vacancy rate was 2.6%.

Racial composition as of the 2020 census
Race	Number	Percentage
White	14,344	85.1%
Black or African American	70	0.4%
American Indian and Alaska Native	354	2.1%
Asian	188	1.1%
Native Hawaiian and Other Pacific Islander	18	0.1%
Some other race	455	2.7%
Two or more races	1,425	8.5%
Hispanic or Latino (of any race)	1,339	7.9%

=== 2010 census ===
As of the census of 2010, there were 14,583 people, 5,747 households, and 3,952 families residing in the city. The population density was 3,031.8 inhabitants per square mile (1,170.6/km^{2}). There were 6,137 housing units at an average density of 1,275.9 per square mile (492.6/km^{2}). The racial makeup of the city was 92.6% White, 0.2% African American, 2.0% Native American, 0.8% Asian, 0.1% Pacific Islander, 1.6% from other races, and 2.7% from two or more races. Hispanic or Latino people of any race were 5.9% of the population.

There were 5,747 households, of which 32.2% had children under the age of 18 living with them, 51.8% were married couples living together, 12.3% had a female householder with no husband present, 4.6% had a male householder with no wife present, and 31.2% were non-families. 26.5% of all households were made up of individuals, and 13.7% had someone living alone who was 65 years of age or older. The average household size was 2.49 and the average family size was 2.98.

The median age in the city was 39.8 years. 25% of residents were under the age of 18; 7.9% were between the ages of 18 and 24; 23.3% were from 25 to 44; 24.8% were from 45 to 64; and 18.8% were 65 years of age or older. The gender makeup of the city was 47.9% male and 52.1% female.

=== 2000 census ===
The median income in 2000 for a household in the city was $35,967, and the median income for a family was $45,156. Males had a median income of $34,271 versus $22,941 for females. The per capita income for the city was $16,734. About 7.8% of families and 9.8% of the population were below the poverty line, including 13.2% of those under age 18 and 5.8% of those age 65 or over.

== Education ==
Chemeketa Community College has a satellite campus, the Chemeketa Polk Center, in Dallas.

== Media ==
The Polk County Itemizer-Observer is a weekly newspaper published in Dallas since 1875. KWIP (880 AM) is the only radio station currently licensed to the city.

== Infrastructure ==
The city's only hospital is West Valley Hospital. Oregon Route 223 is the only state highway that serves the city.

== Notable people ==
- Jeri Ellsworth, self-taught computer chip designer
- Darcy Fast, Major League Baseball pitcher for the Chicago Cubs
- Carl Gerlinger, founder of Gerlinger Carrier Company
- George T. Gerlinger, founder of Willamette Industries
- Irene Hazard Gerlinger, first female regent of the University of Oregon
- Louis Gerlinger Sr., founder of the Salem, Falls City and Western Railway
- Mark Hatfield, former Governor of Oregon; United States senator, 1967–1997
- Johnny Kitzmiller, football player and College Football Hall of Fame member
- Jordan Poyer, pro football strong safety for the Buffalo Bills
- Johnnie Ray, 1950s singer and recording artist

== See also ==
- Dallas High School
- Ellendale, Oregon
