= Gerlinger Hall =

Coordinates: 44.043604°N 123.075768°W

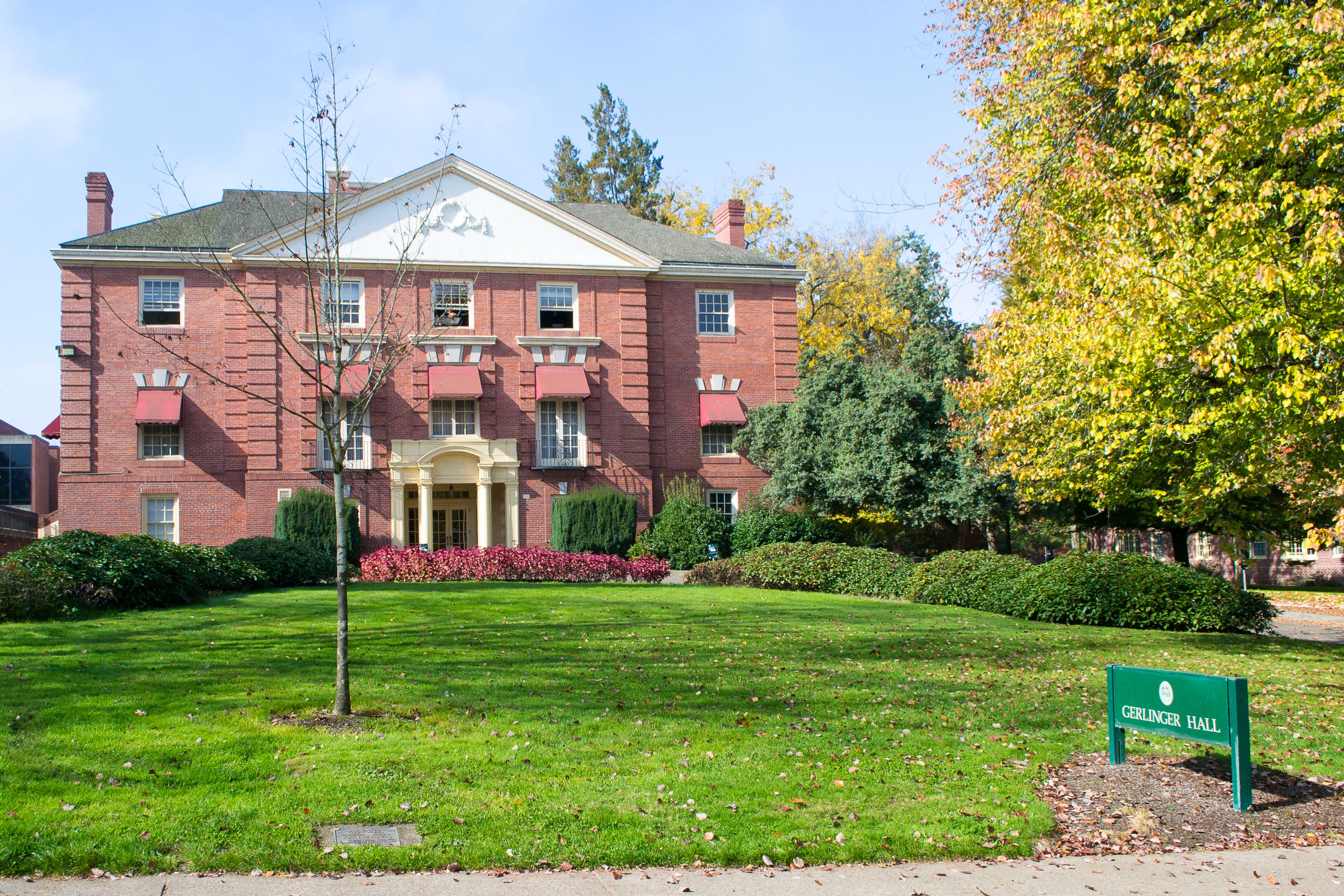
Gerlinger Hall in 2013

Gerlinger Hall is a historic building on the University of Oregon campus in Eugene, Oregon as part of the Women's Memorial Quadrangle. For the first time, enough women were attending the University that they could occupy their own full quadrangle.

== Name ==
Irene Hazard Gerlinger campaigned for the construction of Woman's Memorial Hall starting in 1913; the Hall was built 6 years later (1919-1921). The building was named after her because of her involvement in the fundraising and construction of the Hall, as well as her involvement with the University of Oregon on a larger scale as the first woman Regent. She was also an important fundraiser for the University of Oregon Museum of Art (now the Jordan Schnitzer Museum of Art).

== Design ==
Gerlinger Hall was designed by Ellis Lawrence and William Holford. They had studied at MIT together and were architectural partners from 1913 to 1928. Ellis Lawrence was employed in 1914 to create an architecture program and an architectural plan for the University of Oregon. The Quadrangle, including the Hall, is finished with brick and Classical details. The buildings feature gambrel roofs, and are Georgian Revival in style. Gerlinger Hall is the most distinctively Georgian of the buildings. It is rectangular in plan with a wing on both the east and west sides. The structural system of the hall is heavy timber and the exterior walls are brick. There are three stories and no basement.

== Construction ==
Construction lasted from August 1919 to May 1921. The general contractor was W.O. Heckart of Eugene. Washington Brick of Spokane did the brick, Rushlight and Hastorf did the heating, City Iron Works in Portland did the ironwork, and Standard Artificial Stone Company of Portland did the cast stone. The carvines on the mantels and the grand stairway were based on designs done by students in the Art Department and Professor Larry Schroff did the over-mantel paintings

The Hall was designed for women's physical education, featuring classrooms, ballrooms, a swimming pool, and an alumni hall.

== Campus role ==
Gerlinger Hall is one of three halls (Gerlinger Hall, Susan Campbell Hall, and Hendricks Hall) that make up the Women's Memorial Quadrangle Ensemble, a group recognized on the National Register of Historic Places. The group was nominated under Associated Property Types for the Architecture of Ellis F. Lawrence Multiple Property Submission, previously accepted by the National Register of Historic Places. The nomination has three contributing buildings, the contributing site of the Quadrangle, and one contributing object: the Pioneer Mother statue.

In the 1930s Ellis Lawrence considered converting Gerlinger Hall, with a rear addition, into a student union but Erb Memorial Student Union was designed instead.

In the 1940s, the third floor of Gerlinger Hall briefly served as a girls’ dormitory. This was the same period during which the second floor of Villard Hall was converted into a living space for male students. In the 1970s, Gerlinger Hall saw some remodeling: the enlarging of locker rooms and compliance with safety regulations

== Current status ==
Among the Women's Memorial Quad, the main interior spaces of Gerlinger Hall, Alumni Hall, Gymnasium, and the south gallery are "essentially intact." They are among just a couple historic interiors with good integrity remaining on the University of Oregon campus. Gerlinger Hall's uses have changed little aside from the brief use of the 3rd floor as a girls’ dormitory in the 1940s
