= George T. Gerlinger =

American timber magnate

George T. Gerlinger was influential in the railroad and lumber products business in the U.S. state of Oregon in the early 20th century. The oldest son of Louis Gerlinger, Sr., in 1902 he organized a group of investors in Dallas, Oregon to build railroad lines in the area.

In 1906, Gerlinger and his investors purchased a lumber mill and several stands of timber and founded the Willamette Valley Lumber Company. George served as secretary and manager of the new company. Officers included Louis Gerlinger, Sr., president; H.L. Pittock, vice president; and F.W. Leadbetter, treasurer. George Cone served as director and mill superintendent. In 1967, the company became Willamette Industries. Willamette Industries was one of the largest lumber companies in the world before a hostile takeover by Weyerhaeuser.

Gerlinger Motor Car Company was founded in 1912 by George and his younger brother Louis Gerlinger, Jr. as a car and truck dealership. In 1914, they decided to build their own truck with a more powerful six-cylinder engine. Ed Gerlinger, the youngest brother, was also involved in the business. The Gersix was unveiled in 1915. In 1917, the manufacturing operation was sold to Edgar K. Worthington, their Seattle landlord, and Captain Frederick W. Kent, an ex-Coast Guard Captain, investor and businessman. They re-incorporated as the Gersix Manufacturing Co. In 1923, the company became Kenworth Truck Co.

In October 1955, the State of Oregon dedicated 1,000 acres (4.0 km^{2}) as the George T. Gerlinger State Experimental Forest.

His memorial biography is housed in the World Forestry Center in Portland, Oregon.

George's wife, Irene Hazard Gerlinger, was the first woman on the University of Oregon's Board of Regents and an important fundraiser for the university, including for what was then known as the University of Oregon Museum of Art. Gerlinger Hall on the university campus is named for her.
