= Louis Gerlinger Sr. =

American businessman (1853–1941)

Louis Gerlinger Sr. (25 January 1853 – 9 June 1941) was a businessperson in the railroad and timber industries in the U.S. state of Oregon in the early 20th century.

Gerlinger became involved in the railroad business comparatively late in life. He was born in Weitersweiler, Alsace, in January 1853. At the age of 17, around the time Alsace was annexed by the German Empire, he came to the United States, settling in Chicago. He married and had three sons (George, Louis Jr., and Edward) and a daughter. He built a prosperous store and saloon fixture business.

At 41, Gerlinger left his comfortable, successful Chicago enterprise to move his family west. He settled in Portland, Oregon.

In 1894, Gerlinger bought the existing Young's Brewery in Vancouver, Washington. He promptly renamed it Star Brewing Company to reflect the change in product line. Thus the original Star Brewing Company (also known as Star Brewery) was founded. Gerlinger was the proprietor from 1894 to 1897.

In 1896, Gerlinger organized and built the Portland, Vancouver and Yakima Railroad on behalf of the Harrimans.

In the fall of 1901, Gerlinger purchased 7,000 acres (28 km^{2}) of timber in Polk County, Oregon for a railroad. Just west of Dallas, Oregon, in the Oregon Coast Range, grew hundreds of square miles of untouched Douglas fir and other commercial timber species.

He incorporated the Salem, Falls City and Western Railway Company late in October 1901 and announced plans to build a railroad from the Willamette River at Salem to the mouth of the Siletz River on the Oregon Coast, a distance of 65 miles (105 km).

On May 29, 1903, the first train ran from Dallas to Falls City. At the end of June, passenger trains began regularly scheduled trips to and from Dallas and Falls City each day; the nine-mile (14 km), forty-minute, one-way trip cost 35 cents.

Two of Gerlinger's sons, George T. Gerlinger and Louis Gerlinger Jr., managed the railway.

In 1906, Gerlinger purchased the Cone Lumber Company, and renamed it Willamette Valley Lumber Company (WVLC). The WVLC would become Willamette Industries in 1967 and part of Weyerhaeuser in 2002.

Gerlinger died, at the age of 88 and after a long illness, in Portland on June 9, 1941.
