= Frederick Leadbetter =

Frederick W. Leadbetter
- Occupation: Businessman
- Spouse: Caroline Pittock

Frederick W. Leadbetter (1875–1948) was an Iowa-born financier who made his fortune primarily in lumber and paper milling in the Pacific Northwest and California. He was married to Caroline Pittock, daughter of The Oregonian publisher Henry Pittock, and with his father-in-law established Columbia River Paper Company and the Northwestern Bank of Portland, as well as several enterprises in his own right. His Queen Anne style home on Lacamas Lake near Camas, Washington, complete with a three-story cupola, is a local landmark. He also maintained a residence in Portland. He was active in the management of his businesses, including the paper company, until his death in 1948.
