= Falls City, Oregon =

- City
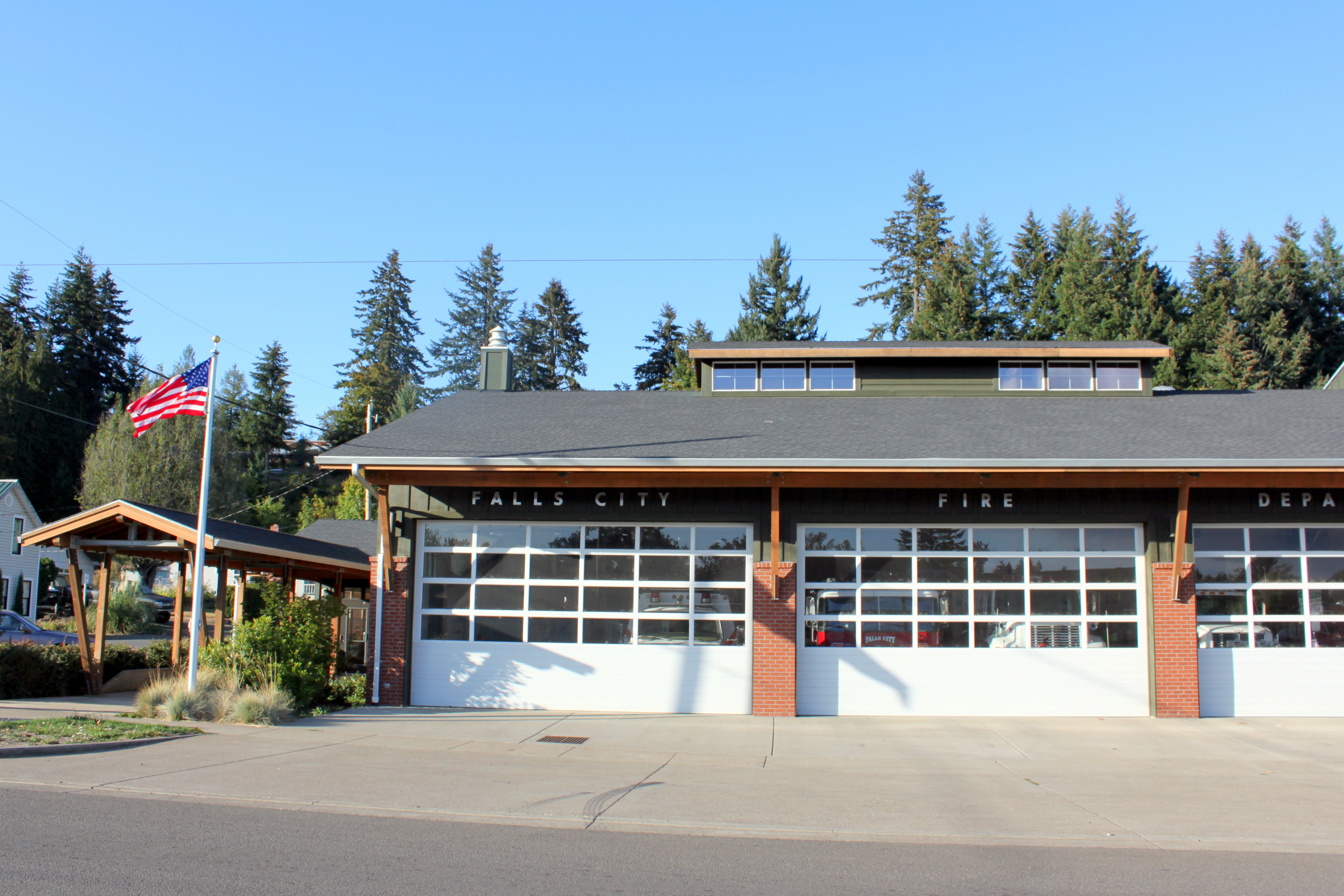
- Fire department in Falls City

- Location in Oregon
- Coordinates: 44°51′58″N 123°26′19″W
- Country: United States
- State: Oregon
- County: Polk
- Incorporated: 1893

Government
  - Mayor: TJ Bailey

Area
  - Total: 1.20 sq mi (3.11 km^{2})
  - Land: 1.20 sq mi (3.11 km^{2})
  - Water: 0 sq mi (0.00 km^{2})
- Elevation: 381 ft (116 m)

Population (2020)
  - Total: 1,051
  - Density: 874.7/sq mi (337.72/km^{2})
- Time zone: UTC-8 (Pacific)
  - Summer (DST): UTC-7 (Pacific)
- ZIP code: 97344
- Area code: 503
- FIPS code: 41-24550
- GNIS feature ID: 2410482
- Website: www.fallscityoregon.gov

Falls City is a city in Polk County, Oregon, United States. The population was 1,051 at the 2020 census. It is part of the Salem Metropolitan Statistical Area.

== History ==
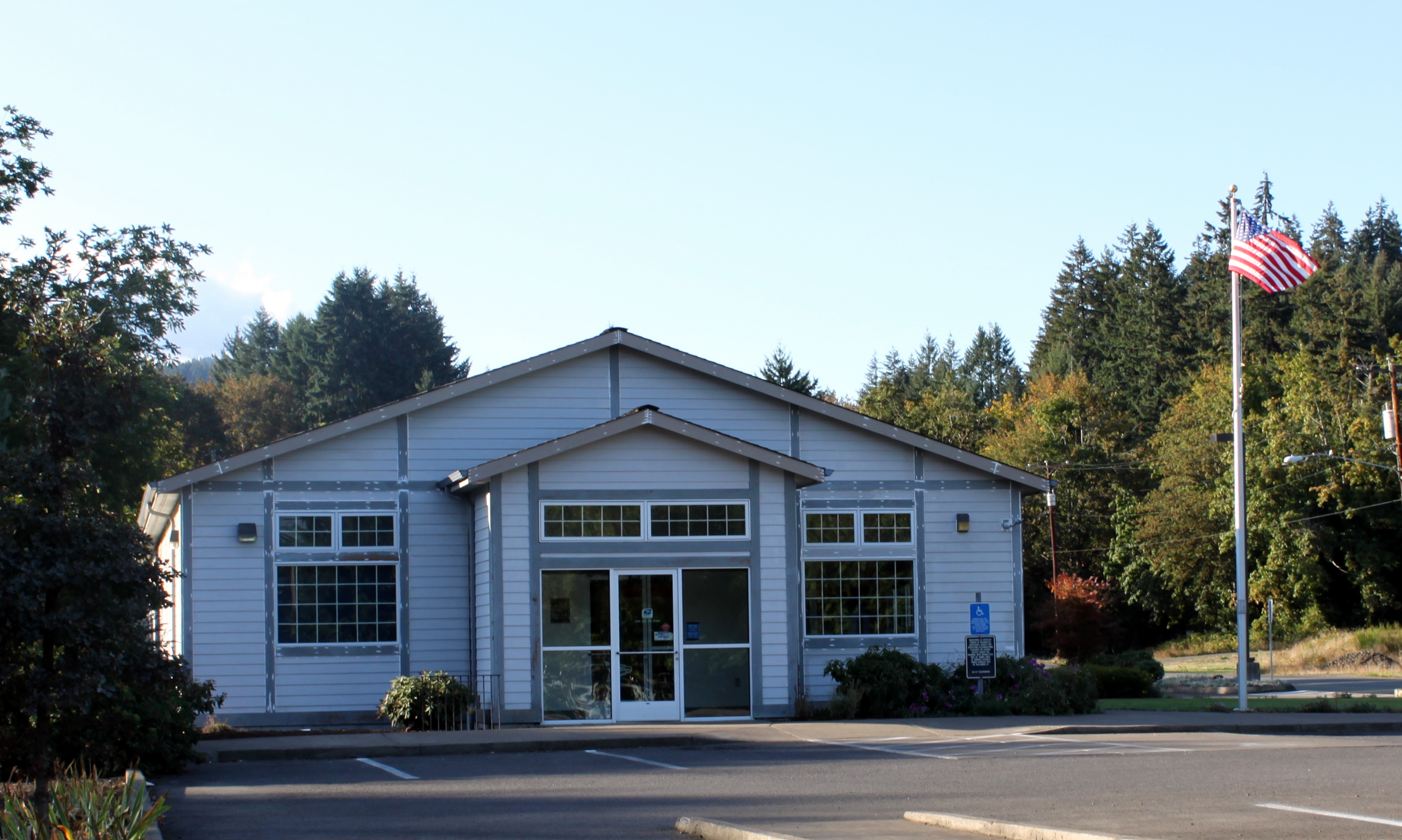
Post office

Falls City is named after a waterfall (Berry Creek Falls) in the Little Luckiamute River that passes through the center of town. In the past it was a lumbermill town and once had three mills in operation, a bank, hotel, soda shop, jail, and several grocery stores and bars. It formerly supported a large logging population and other population centers in the hills of the Coast Range, such as the smaller lumber-based community of Black Rock and the company-owned mill town Valsetz.

== Geography ==
According to the United States Census Bureau, the city has a total area of 1.20 square miles (3.11 km^{2}), all of it land.

== Climate ==
The city of Falls City experiences warm and dry summers, and cold and wet winters, with no average monthly temperatures above 71.6 °F or 22 °C. According to the Köppen Climate Classification, Falls City has a warm-summer Mediterranean climate, abbreviated Csb on climate maps.

Climate data for Falls City
Month	Jan	Feb	Mar	Apr	May	Jun	Jul	Aug	Sep	Oct	Nov	Dec	Year
Record high °F (°C)	68 (20)	67 (19)	82 (28)	88 (31)	94 (34)	102 (39)	106 (41)	102 (39)	100 (38)	90 (32)	74 (23)	63 (17)	106 (41)
Mean daily maximum °F (°C)	44.6 (7.0)	49.2 (9.6)	53.9 (12.2)	60.4 (15.8)	66.6 (19.2)	71.7 (22.1)	80.4 (26.9)	80.4 (26.9)	74.3 (23.5)	63.3 (17.4)	52.2 (11.2)	46.2 (7.9)	61.9 (16.6)
Mean daily minimum °F (°C)	31.5 (−0.3)	33.3 (0.7)	35.3 (1.8)	37.9 (3.3)	41.8 (5.4)	45.9 (7.7)	48.4 (9.1)	48.2 (9.0)	46.4 (8.0)	42 (6)	36.2 (2.3)	33.4 (0.8)	40 (4)
Record low °F (°C)	−5 (−21)	1 (−17)	18 (−8)	23 (−5)	26 (−3)	26 (−3)	36 (2)	36 (2)	26 (−3)	23 (−5)	10 (−12)	−2 (−19)	−5 (−21)
Average precipitation inches (mm)	12.49 (317)	10.19 (259)	9.16 (233)	4.36 (111)	2.65 (67)	1.5 (38)	0.3 (7.6)	0.56 (14)	1.9 (48)	5.22 (133)	11.81 (300)	13.61 (346)	73.75 (1,873)
Average snowfall inches (cm)	7.8 (20)	2.8 (7.1)	2.3 (5.8)	0 (0)	0 (0)	0 (0)	0 (0)	0 (0)	0 (0)	0.1 (0.25)	0.5 (1.3)	2.4 (6.1)	16 (41)
Average precipitation days	19	16	18	13	11	7	2	3	6	12	17	19	143

== Demographics ==
Historical population
Census	Pop.	Note	%±
1900	269		—
1910	969		260.2%
1920	994		2.6%
1930	494		−50.3%
1940	715		44.7%
1950	853		19.3%
1960	653		−23.4%
1970	745		14.1%
1980	804		7.9%
1990	818		1.7%
2000	966		18.1%
2010	947		−2.0%
2020	1,051		11.0%
U.S. Decennial Census

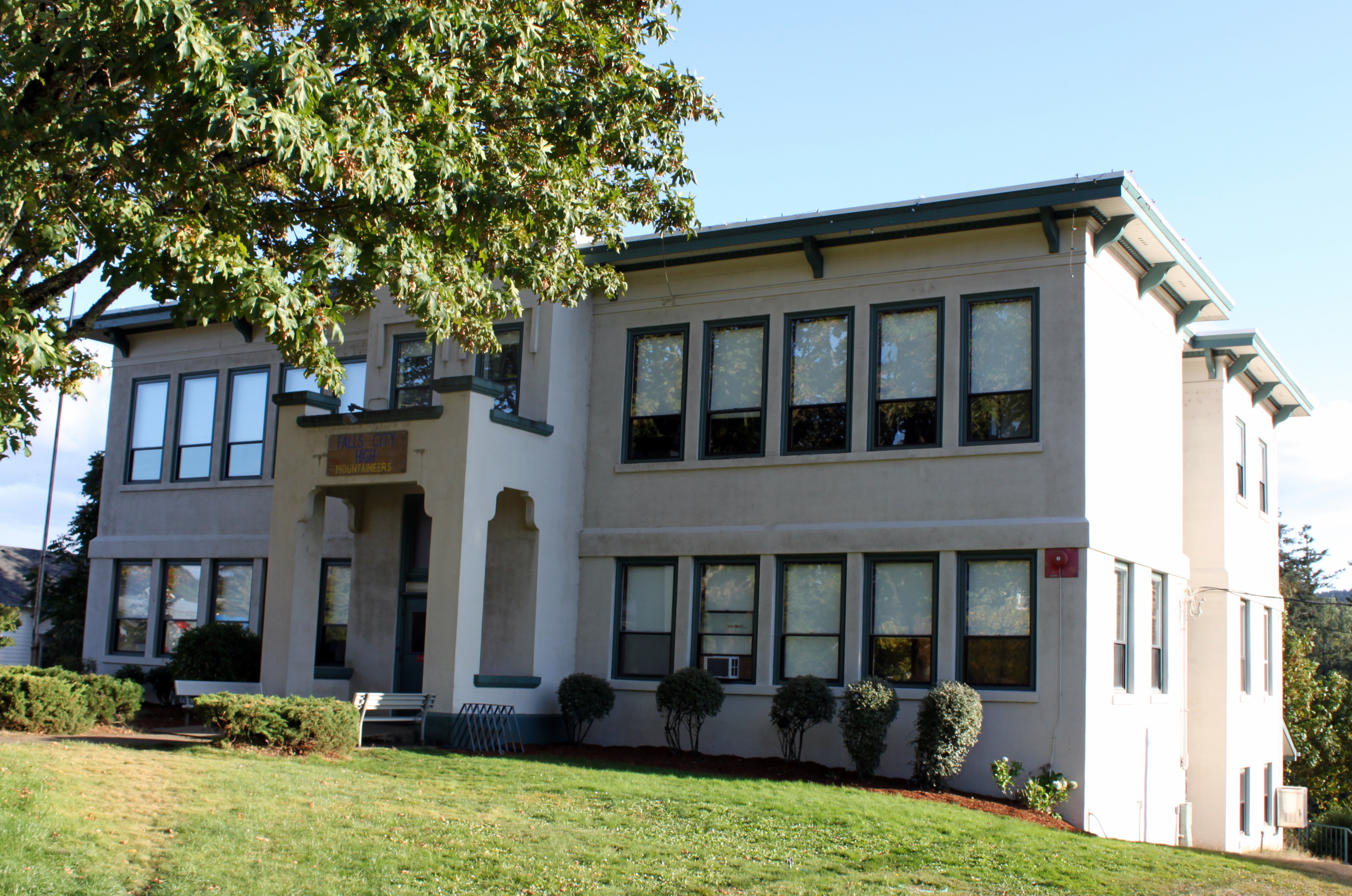
Falls City High School

=== 2020 census ===
As of the 2020 census, Falls City had a population of 1,051. The median age was 43.6 years. 20.9% of residents were under the age of 18 and 18.9% of residents were 65 years of age or older. For every 100 females there were 106.5 males, and for every 100 females age 18 and over there were 105.7 males age 18 and over.

0% of residents lived in urban areas, while 100.0% lived in rural areas.

There were 392 households in Falls City, of which 27.6% had children under the age of 18 living in them. Of all households, 41.8% were married-couple households, 22.4% were households with a male householder and no spouse or partner present, and 23.5% were households with a female householder and no spouse or partner present. About 23.2% of all households were made up of individuals and 11.0% had someone living alone who was 65 years of age or older.

There were 416 housing units, of which 5.8% were vacant. Among occupied housing units, 77.3% were owner-occupied and 22.7% were renter-occupied. The homeowner vacancy rate was 0.7% and the rental vacancy rate was 8.2%.

Racial composition as of the 2020 census
Race	Number	Percent
White	901	85.7%
Black or African American	1	0.1%
American Indian and Alaska Native	26	2.5%
Asian	5	0.5%
Native Hawaiian and Other Pacific Islander	1	0.1%
Some other race	6	0.6%
Two or more races	111	10.6%
Hispanic or Latino (of any race)	47	4.5%

=== 2010 census ===
As of the census of 2010, there were 947 people, 366 households, and 261 families residing in the city. The population density was 789.2 inhabitants per square mile (304.7/km^{2}). There were 395 housing units at an average density of 329.2 per square mile (127.1/km^{2}). The racial makeup of the city was 91.6% White, 0.1% African American, 2.3% Native American, 0.4% Asian, 0.1% Pacific Islander, 1.8% from other races, and 3.7% from two or more races. Hispanic or Latino of any race were 5.2% of the population.

There were 366 households, of which 30.3% had children under the age of 18 living with them, 54.4% were married couples living together, 10.4% had a female householder with no husband present, 6.6% had a male householder with no wife present, and 28.7% were non-families. 22.7% of all households were made up of individuals, and 7.6% had someone living alone who was 65 years of age or older. The average household size was 2.59 and the average family size was 2.98.

The median age in the city was 43.5 years. 22.9% of residents were under the age of 18; 8% were between the ages of 18 and 24; 21% were from 25 to 44; 31.9% were from 45 to 64; and 16.3% were 65 years of age or older. The gender makeup of the city was 51.5% male and 48.5% female.

=== 2000 census ===
As of the census of 2000, there were 966 people, 338 households, and 255 families residing in the city. The population density was 785.2 inhabitants per square mile (303.2/km^{2}). There were 373 housing units at an average density of 303.2 per square mile (117.1/km^{2}). The racial makeup of the city was 92.86% White, 0.93% African American, 1.66% Native American, 0.10% Asian, 0.21% Pacific Islander, 1.04% from other races, and 3.21% from two or more races. Hispanic or Latino of any race were 3.62% of the population.

There were 338 households, out of which 35.2% had children under the age of 18 living with them, 58.3% were married couples living together, 13.6% had a female householder with no husband present, and 24.3% were non-families. 19.2% of all households were made up of individuals, and 9.5% had someone living alone who was 65 years of age or older. The average household size was 2.86 and the average family size was 3.25.

In the city, the population was spread out, with 31.0% under the age of 18, 5.5% from 18 to 24, 26.7% from 25 to 44, 22.4% from 45 to 64, and 14.5% who were 65 years of age or older. The median age was 38 years. For every 100 females, there were 91.7 males. For every 100 females age 18 and over, there were 88.4 males.

The median income for a household in the city was $32,461, and the median income for a family was $36,528. Males had a median income of $31,827 versus $26,429 for females. The per capita income for the city was $13,858. About 11.6% of families and 15.8% of the population were below the poverty line, including 16.5% of those under age 18 and 9.0% of those age 65 or over.
