= Armour (surname) =

Armour is a surname. Notable people with the surname include:

- Adam Armour (born 2002), American soccer player
- Andrew Watson Armour III (1908–1991), Armour and Company president, relative of Philip Danforth Armour
- Andy Armour (1883–1955), Scottish footballer
- Anthony Armour (born 1982), Australian rugby player
- Aviva Armour-Ostroff, Canadian actress, writer and filmmaker
- Bill Armour (1869–1922), American baseball player and manager
- Buddy Armour (1915–1974), American baseball player
- Carlos Armour (born 1986), American gridiron football player
- David Armour (born 1954), Australian rules footballer
- Edward Armour Peck
- G. Armour Craig
- George Armour (1812–1881), Scottish American businessman and philanthropist
- George Denholm Armour (1864–1949), Scottish painter and illustrator
- Hazel Armour (1894–1985), Scottish sculptor and medalist
- Heda Armour (1914–1996), British painter and etcher
- Herman Armour Webster American etcher water colorist
- Herman Ossian Armour (1837–1901), co-founder of Armour and Company
- J. Ogden Armour (1863–1927), American meatpacking magnate
- James Armour Johnstone
- James Armour (1841–1928), Irish Presbyterian minister and political activist
- James Armour (1731–1798), Master mason
- Jean Armour Polly
- Jean Armour (1765–1834), known as the "Belle of Mauchline" wife of the Scottish poet, Robert Burns.
- Jenner Armour (1932–2001), Dominican politician and former president
- Jennifer Armour (born 1985), American actress
- Jesse Armour Crandall (1834–1920),
- JoJuan Armour (born 1976), American gridiron football player
- Jody Armour
- John Armour (born 1971), British legal scholar
- John Douglas Armour (1830–1903), Canadian judge
- Johnny Armour (born 1968), English boxer
- Julian Armour (born 1960), Canadian cellist and artistic director
- Justin Armour (born 1973), American football player
- Leslie Armour (1931–2004), was a Canadian-born philosopher and writer on social economics
- Lester Armour III
- Margaret Armour (1860–1943), Scottish poet and translator
- Marion Armour, Scottish female curler
- Mary Nicol Neill Armour (1902–2000), British artist
- Matthew Armour (1820–1903), was a radical Free Church of Scotland minister on the island of Sanday, Orkney
- Neil Armour (born 1967), Scottish football player
- Norman Armour (1887–1982), American diplomat
- Philip Danforth Armour (1832–1901), meatpacker and businessman, founder of Armour and Company
- Rebecca Agatha Armour (1845–1891), Canadian teacher and novelist
- Richard Armour (1906–1989), American author and poet
- Robert Armour (1781–1857), Canadian businessman, militia officer, and office holder
- Robert W. Armour (born 1986), American actor and entertainer
- Roger Armour (1934–2020), British vascular surgeon and inventor
- Ronald Armour (1940–2017), Dominican politician
- Ryan Armour (born 1976), American golfer
- Sid Armour, Canadian make-up artist
- Stanley Armour Dunham (1918–1992), Maternal grandfather of Barack Obama And JJ Green
- Thomas Armour (1890–1963), was a bishop in the Anglican Church of Australia
- Tommy Armour III (born 1959), American golfer
- Tommy Armour (1896–1968), American golfer
- Vernice Armour (born 1973), United States Marine Corps pilot
- Wal Armour (1921–1995), Australian rules footballer
- William Allan Armour (1880–1967), New Zealand school principal and educationalist
