= Edward H. Bennett House and Studio =

Historic house in Illinois, United States

- U.S. National Register of Historic Places
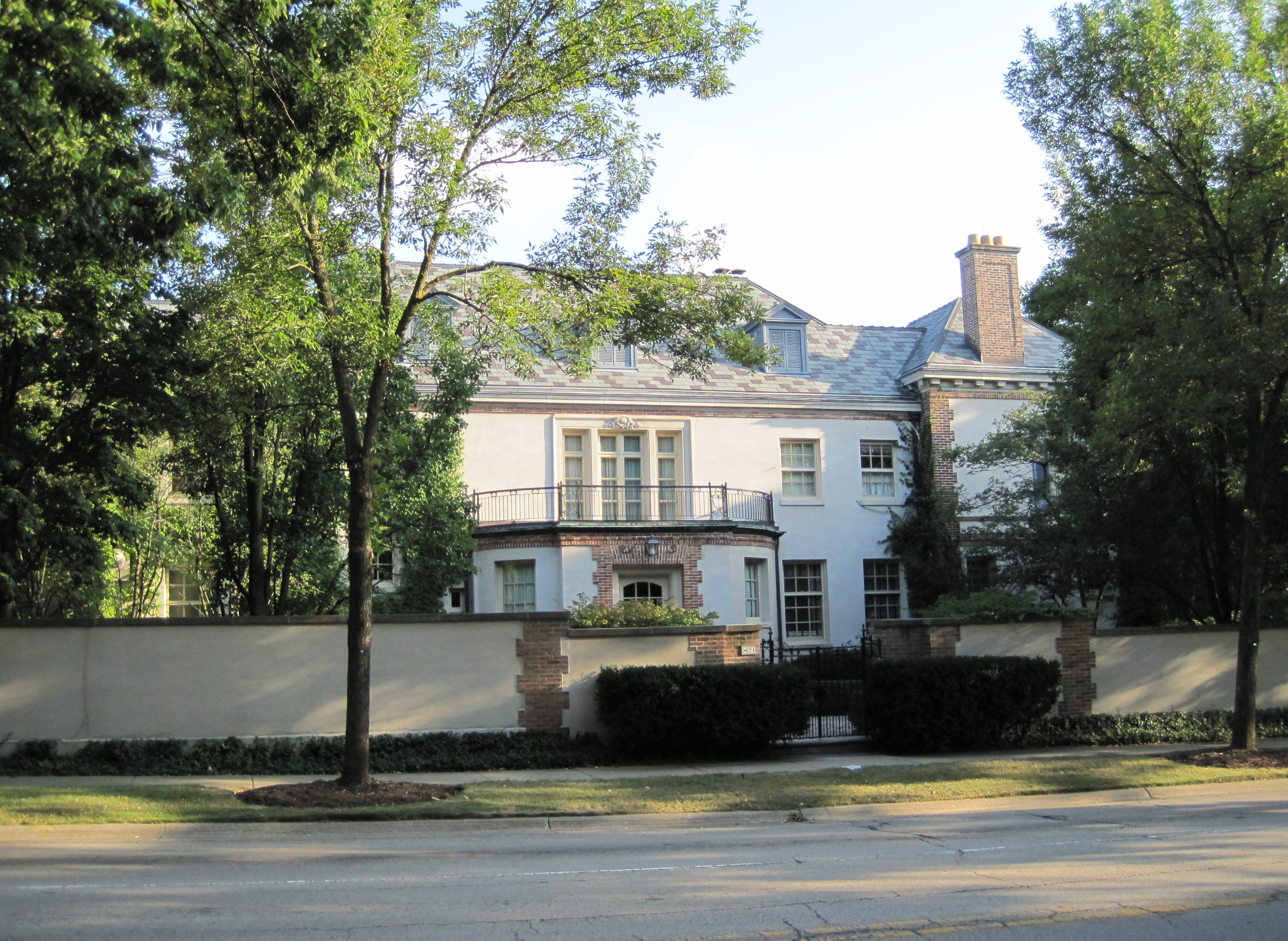

- Location within Illinois Location within the United States
- Location: 89 E. Deerpath, Lake Forest, Illinois
- Coordinates: 42°15′1″N 87°50′41″W
- Area: 2 acres (0.81 ha)
- Built: 1916
- Architect: Edward H. Bennett
- Architectural style: Châteauesque, Streamline Moderne
- NRHP reference No.: 95000196
- Added to NRHP: March 3, 1995

The Edward H. Bennett House and Studio is an architecturally significant house in Lake Forest, Illinois, United States. It was designed by and built for Edward H. Bennett, who is best known as an urban planner and architect who worked in association with Daniel Burnham.

== History ==
Edward H. Bennett was born in Bristol, England and showed an early predilection to the arts. Bennett first practiced in 1892 and later studied at École des Beaux-Arts in Paris, France. He graduated in 1900 and moved to New York City, New York, United States to practice under George B. Post in 1902. Post sent Bennett to work on a project under Daniel Burnham in 1903. This began a nine-year mentorship between Burnham and Bennett.

Bennett moved to Chicago, Illinois in 1903 to work more closely with Burnham. He settled in suburban Lake Forest in 1906. Burnham retired a year after the completion of the Burnham Plan of Chicago and Bennett was able to establish an extensive private practice. Bennett married Catherine Jones in 1913 and her father gave them a large parcel of land in Lake Forest at the corner of Deerpath and Green Bay Road. Bennett began designing an estate house for the lot two years later.

The house, which the Bennetts called "Bagatelle", was completed in 1916. It was modeled after its namesake French country house, Le Chateau de Bagatelle. The gardens were likewise based on the Bagatelle Gardens in the Bois de Bologne. Bennett intended the residence to only be a summer house, but the Bennetts spent most of their time in the house. Bennett designed a zoning plan for Lake Forest in 1923 and a city plan in 1929. He moved into the house full-time in 1930 after remarrying. In 1936, he designed and built a studio on the southwest corner of the lot. The studio was designed in the Streamline Moderne style; this was probably due to Bennett's connection with the 1933 Century of Progress.

Bennett retired in 1944 and spent the next ten years at his houses in Lake Forest, North Carolina, and New Mexico. The house was recognized by the National Park Service with a listing on the National Register of Historic Places on March 3, 1995.

It remains privately owned as of 2025.
