= George Armour =

Scottish American businessman (1812–1881)

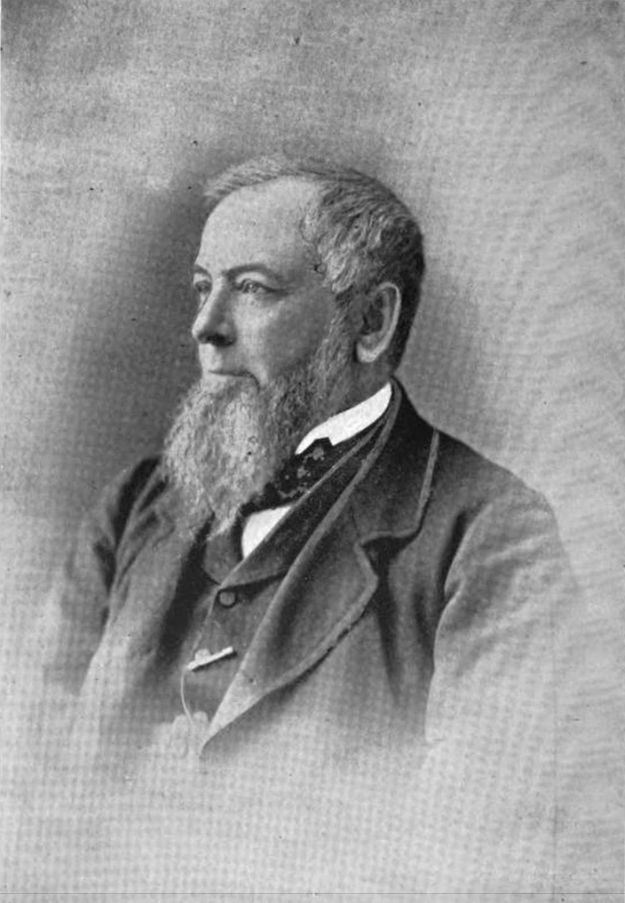
- Armour circa 1870s
- Born: 24 April 1812; Campbeltown, Scotland
- Died: 13 June 1881 (aged 69); Brighton, England
- Resting place: Graceland Cemetery, Chicago, Illinois; 41.9545°N 87.662278°W,
- Occupations: Wheelright; cooper; businessman; banker; President of the Chicago Board of Trade; philanthropist
- Political party: Republican
- Spouse: Barbara Allison Armour (married 1850s–1881; his death)
- Children: 5
- Family: Armour family

President of the Chicago Board of Trade
- In office 1870
- Preceded by: George M. How
- Succeeded by: John R. Bensley

Signature
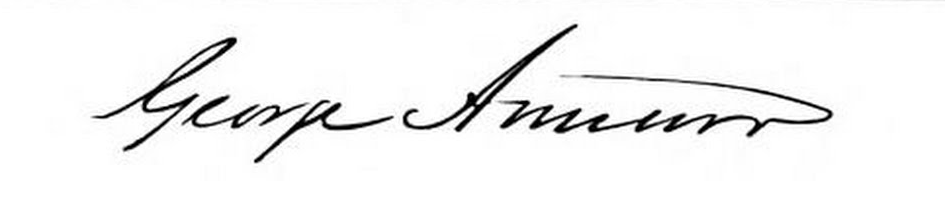

George Armour (24 April 1812 – 13 June 1881) was a Scottish American businessman and philanthropist involved in the development of grain elevator infrastructure in Chicago. He was credited with developing the grain elevator system, establishing grain trading standards as director and president of the Chicago Board of Trade (CBT), founding the Chicago, Burlington and Quincy Railroad (CBQ), Commercial Club of Chicago, YMCA of Chicago, Merchants' Loan & Trust Company (MLTC), the precursor to Continental Illinois, and the Chicago Academy of Fine Arts which later became the School of the Art Institute of Chicago and Art Institute of Chicago. He served as a director of several notable companies during his career.

As founder of Armour, Dole & Co. and other firms, he helped build the first extensive system of large mechanized grain elevators in Chicago, enabling the shipment of grains from the American Midwest to destinations around the world. During his tenure, the CBT standardized the grading and selling of grains and established the first commodity futures markets. He was "popularly known as the father of the grain elevator system" or as a "rapacious, blood sucking insect."

== Early life ==
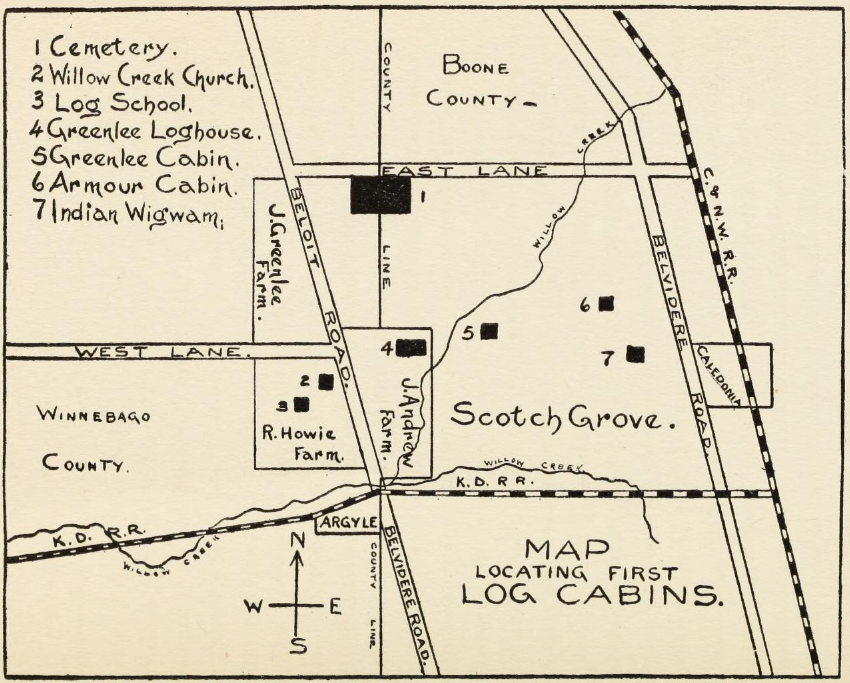
Map locating first cabins Argyle, IL – includes location of cabin belonging to John and George Armour – circa 1830s

George Armour was born on 24 April 1812, in Campbeltown, Scotland, on the Mull of Kintyre. Armour was a wheelwright and worked his way across the ocean as a shipboard cooper or carpenter.

In 1834, Armour with his brother John and cousin James a shoemaker, left Campbeltown and made a voyage to Ottawa, Illinois. Soon after their arrival in Ottawa, the brothers went north to what was then known as the "Argyle Settlement" near Rockford, Illinois. The brothers built a 14' x 14' cabin in hopes of establishing a timber and prairie land claim, but "farming was not to their liking."

In 1836, while on a trip to back to Scotland, the brothers helped their friend John Greenlee and his family escape from Campbeltown in order to avoid Greenlee being arrested by one of the Duke of Argyll's tax collectors. After the escape, the brothers furnished the Greenlees with passage to the US and set up the Greenlees in the cabin they had built in the Argyle Settlement. Subsequently, Armour lived in Joliet and Lockport, Illinois, and entered the business of merchandising. At the time, both cities were expanding rapidly because of the construction of the Illinois and Michigan Canal. Lockport became headquarters for building the canal in 1837.

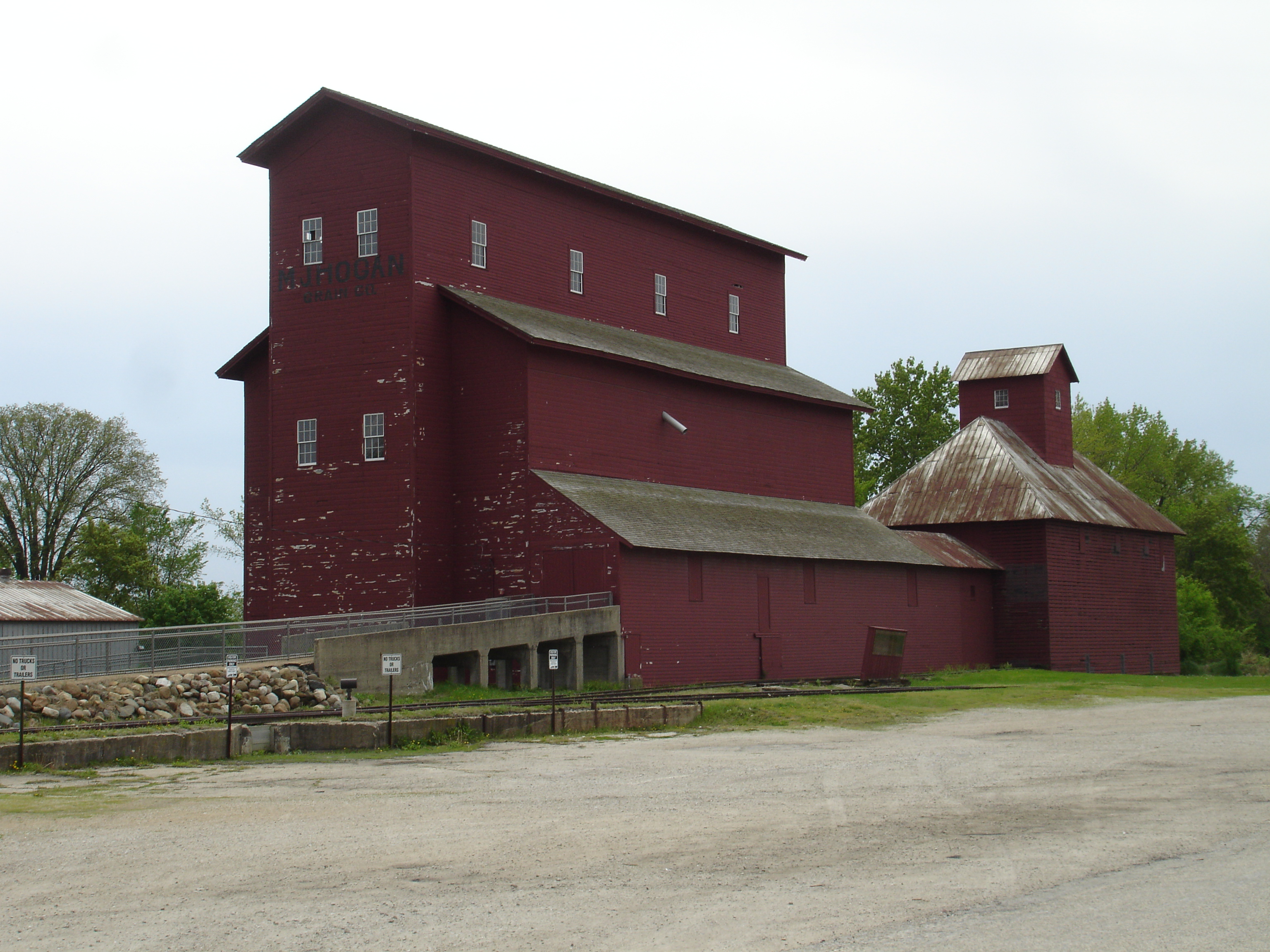
Armour's Warehouse, Seneca, IL

Later Armour became a sub-contractor with George Steel. Steel was born in Forfarshire, Scotland in 1797 and arrived in Chicago in 1837. Steel had come to the US on contract for building a section of the Illinois & Michigan Canal but the work had stopped in the aftermath of the Panic of 1837. Steel and Armour built a section of the Illinois and Michigan Canal sometime between 1836 and 1848. They also built a portion of the CBQ. The railroad was constructed starting in March 1848 and was completed in 1853. Armour was a contractor for 16 miles (out of 181 miles) of road grading for the ROCK which started construction in 1851 and was completed by 1854. Armour most likely also worked on the Galena and Chicago Union Railroad – the first railroad built west of Chicago, which established William B. Ogden and George Smith as major figures in Chicago history. Smith operated a "wildcat bank" that issued scrip which was used to pay workers – including Armour's employees.

In the early 1850s, Armour resettled in Chicago. His brother John Armour remained in Ottawa where he became a successful businessman. Of John Armour's many investments, one that remains is Armour's Warehouse built in 1861. (Note: Also known as the Seneca Grain Elevator or the Hogan's North Elevator, the structure is a historic grain elevator located in the village of Seneca, Illinois, United States. The elevator and two surrounding outbuildings were listed on the U.S. National Register of Historic Places in 1997.) Records of how George Armour's career developed over the following decades are incomplete. (Note: Armour appears to have arrived in America with a tradesman's education, limited access to capital and few social connections of any significance. Surviving records do not fully explain how he came to be involved in a series of major Chicago business ventures over the following decades.)

== Prospering in Chicago ==
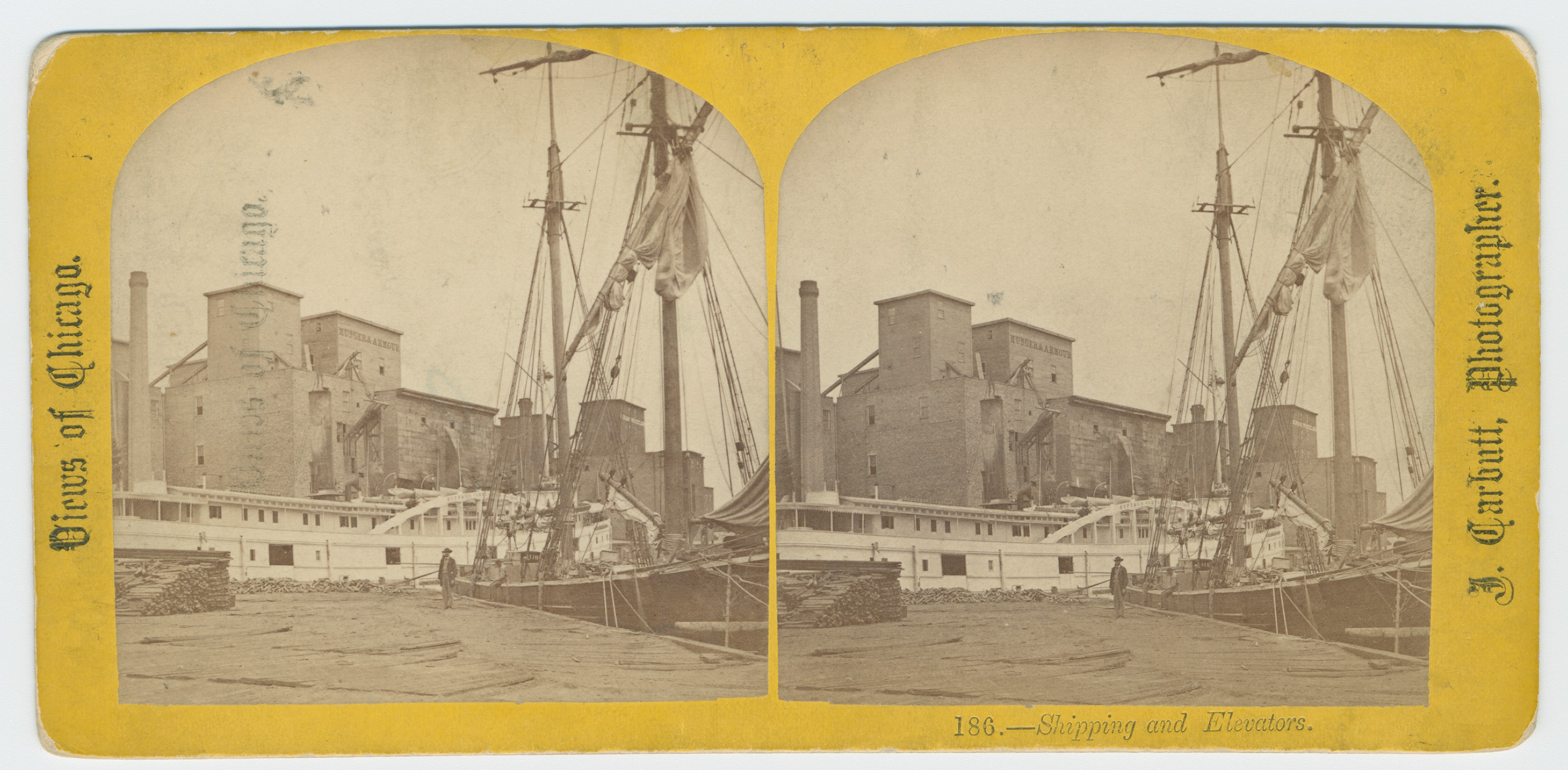
Munger & Armour grain elevator, Chicago, IL, 1868?

In Chicago, Armour reunited with George Steel – who had become a prosperous Chicago businessman. In 1852–1853 Steel was president of Chicago Board of Trade. In 1856, a new three-story building was erected on Steel's site: an office and warehouse located at the foot of LaSalle Street on South Street and this became the first permanent home for the CBT. Armour was an early member of the CBT and also commenced what became his signature venture – the erection and management of grain elevators.

Prior to Armour's efforts there had been a small number of what may be termed "grain elevators" constructed in the United States. Dart's Elevator was the world's first steam-powered grain elevator. It was designed and built by Joseph Dart and Robert Dunbar in 1842 in Buffalo, New York. The first large steam elevator ever built in Chicago for handling grain from railroad tracks was on the North side, on the Chicago River, west of Wells Street. It was built by George A Gibbs and E W Griffin of Gibbs, Griffin & Company in 1854. It might also have been known as the Chicago & Galena Union Railroad Elevator.

In 1854, George Steel took over a warehouse and built another grain elevator just west of the Gibbs, Griffin and Company warehouse. It was capable of operating from the canal as well as the railroads. The elevator had a capacity of 100,000 bushels and was located at Franklin and River streets – in the Chicago & Galena Union Railroad track on North Water Street.

In that year Steel's warehouse burnt down and Steel sold the property to Wesley Munger and George Armour. Munger had owned a small mill at Waukegan, which had burned down. As Munger & Armour, they built the first modern, steam-driven grain elevator in Chicago. The grain elevator was completed in 1855 and had a capacity of 300,000 bushels.

Armour was first elected a director of the CBT in 1856.

In 1860, he joined with Charles Sydney Dole, James Henry Doyle and Wesley Munger, together running Armour, Dole & Co. The company operated grain elevators at the depot of the CBQ with a capacity of 850,000 bushels. After the American Civil War, Armour, Dole & Co. remained among the city's leading grain warehousers. Their elevators had a combined capacity of 2.1 million bushels in 1871. By the early 1880s, this figure had grown to 6.3 million bushels.

In 1863, Hiram Wheeler entered the Munger & Armour, which then became Munger, Wheeler & Co. Armour remained a partner. The company owned large grain elevators next to the depot of the Chicago & North Western Railroad.

At the Chicago Canal Convention of 1863, Armour was a member of the CBT delegation. The Convention proceedings called for laws and budgets to widen and deepen the Illinois and Michigan Canal and thus make it possible for ships to sail between the Great Lakes and the Mississippi River.

=== Business requirements ===
Building a system capable of moving very large quantities of grain required more than steam-powered conveyor belts. Chicago's grain trade depended on:

- Products that could be graded for quality according to industry-standards
- Banks that did not fail and supported stable currencies
- Futures exchange where contracts to buy specific quantities of a commodity or financial instrument at a specified price with delivery set at a specified time in the future

==== Industry-standard grading systems for grains ====
Through the 1830s sacks or barrels or even buckets of grain were hoisted off vessels and into warehouses by manpower – sometimes even using bucket brigades. The amounts of grain being moved in a contract were measured in the thousands of bushels. By the 1840s, a certain amount of bulk transport was taking place and grain was stored in individual bins according to source in warehouses and the heavy lifting was done by block and tackle pulled by horses. By 1848, the horse was replaced by a steam engine, but not the block and tackle. The amounts being moved were in the tens of thousands of bushels. If the transport of grain was to move into the hundreds of thousands of bushels then changes were needed.

When grains from multiple sources were to be co-mingled in silos holding hundred of thousands of bushels, then methods of grading and inspecting the quality of the grain are required. The CBT had been concerned with grading and inspecting products since the day it was founded. In 1856 Armour was elected to the Board of Directors of the CBT. In the same year, his partner Charles Dole was charged to set up a committee with the purpose of establishing grades by the separation of wheat into three industry-standard grades. By 1858, the grading and inspecting standards were established and compliance mechanisms set up. In 1859, the CBT received a state charter that enabled it to enforce grading standards and inspections with a legally binding basis.

==== Banks that do not fail ====
In banking, the period 1837 to 1863 is known as the "Free Banking" era. It was a period of "Wildcat Banks". In the Panic of 1837, out of 850 banks in the United States, 343 closed entirely, 62 failed partially. If Armour's business was to prosper, he needed a bank that would not fail. In 1857, along with Cyrus McCormick, who invented the reaper, and Chicago's first mayor, William B. Ogden, Armour was a founder and, later, elected director of the Merchants' Loan and Trust Company. The book published by MLTC in 1907 titled Fifty Years of Banking in Chicago identified the banks' early mission:

The creation of the Merchants' Loan and Trust Company was the protest of Chicago's soundest businessmen and financiers against the continuance of irresponsible and unscientific banking.

==== Fixed pricing by using futures contracts ====
In 1865, the CBT recognized the futures contract as a legitimate feature of trades and full rules were first established. Given the increase in pricing certainty around the globe, Chicago grain elevator operators became free to construct grain elevators with capacities of millions of bushels.

==== Other factors ====
Beyond these three conditions, a number of other requirements had to be met. The technology for moving grain continued to develop, with trains, vessels and conveyors improving steadily. Site and logistics planning for the warehouses also mattered: warehouses needed to have navigable water on one side and railroads on the other side. The navigable waters needed to give vessels access to any other port in the world. The railroads needed to reach tens of thousands of farms to the west as well to the major consumer cities on the East coast.

Armour was a stockholder in the CBQ, the Chicago & Northwestern, and the Chicago Milwaukee and St Paul Railroads. Later he was a director of the ROCK. At the Chicago Canal Convention of 1863, Armour was a member of the CBT delegation.

Because of the likelihood of dust explosions, grain warehouses were frequent venues for fires. Armour was a local director of the Liverpool & London & Globe Insurance Company, a director of the Chicago Mutual Insurance Company and a director of the Merchants Insurance Company.

By 1870, the remaining impediments to growth were less about the technology and more about legal and political matters. In 1870 the Chicago Tribune reported:

The name of a Chicago warehouseman has become a synonym with that of a pirate .... It may be safely affirmed that no man voluntarily sends his grain to Chicago who can send it elsewhere.

== Chicago Fire and after ==
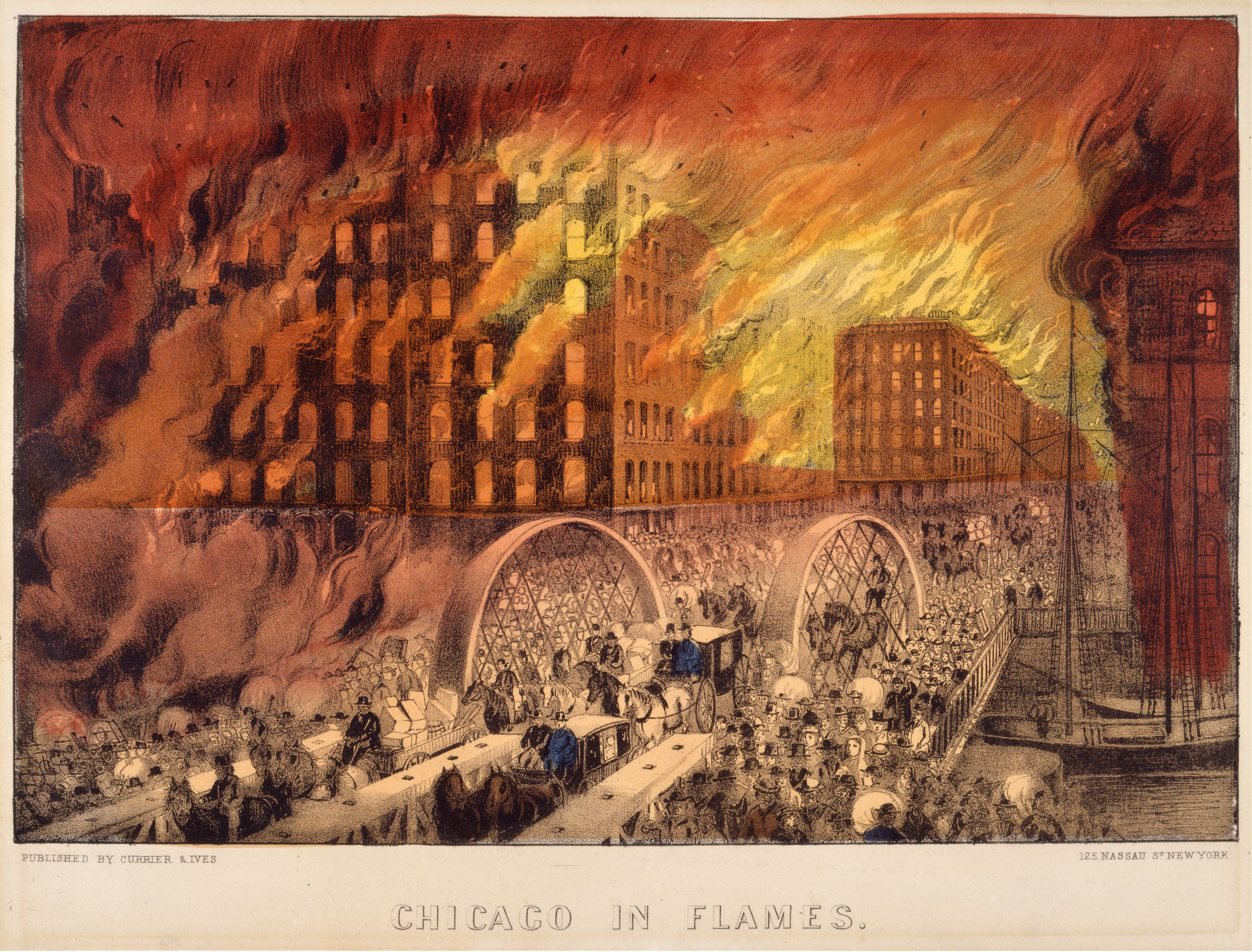
Chicago in Flames by Currier & Ives, 1871

The Great Chicago Fire burned from Sunday, 8 October, to early Tuesday, 10 October 1871. The fire killed up to 300 people, destroyed roughly 3.3 square miles (9 km2) of Chicago, Illinois, and left more than 100,000 residents homeless. Armour and his partners were physically unharmed but their various business affairs were disrupted. The offices of Armour, Dole and Co, Munger & Wheeler were destroyed as well as Armour, Dole & Co Elevator "A", the MLTC offices, the Merchants Insurance Company offices – which were exploded to make a fire break that failed – and the CBT offices.

The story of how the MLTC was able to move the bank's funds at the height of the fire is described in The Advancement of Chicago as a Financial Center up to the Close of the Nineteenth Century. Also described was the setting up of an improvised bank in Solomon A Smith's dining room on Monday, 9 October and recreating all the accounts even with all the banks and most of the customer's records had been destroyed.

The Munn & Scott affair occurred, starting in 1872. See below.

In 1875, Armour was elected president of the CBT. (Note: Armour's election followed his purchase of the Munn interests during the 1872 affair described below.) During his tenure, on 14 January, the King of Hawaii visited the CBT trading floor and a racist incident occurred. It was covered in detail by the Chicago Tribune. Also during the year, for the first time, memberships could be bought and sold and a committee was instituted to report of the recommendation of situating a US mint in Chicago. The report was an added as an appendix to the CBT annual report.

There were few further impediments to growth. By 1885, the capacity of the Armour, Dole & Co grain elevators was 6,350,000 bushels with a total shipping and receiving capacity of 1,500,000 per day.

== Munn & Scott affair ==
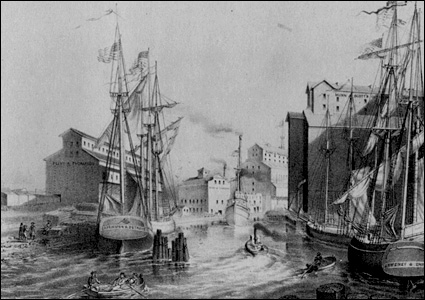
Munn & Sccott Grain-Elevators, Chicago 1866

The Munn & Scott grain-warehousing company was founded in 1844 in Spring Bay, Illinois, north of Peoria. By 1856, Ira Y. Munn and his partners owned a large Chicago grain elevator with a capacity of 200,000 bushels. George L. Scott joined the enterprise in 1858, and the name was changed name to Munn & Scott. By the end of the Civil War, the company owned four Chicago grain elevators with a total capacity of 2.3 million bushels, nearly a third of the total capacity of all of the city's large elevators.

Munn served as president of the Chicago Board of Trade and as president of the city's Chamber of Commerce in 1868. Annual revenues reached about $4 million in 1867; by 1870, the company ranked as the city's leading grain warehouse.

By 1868 Munn & Scott and four other firms – including Armour, Dole and Co – dominated the Chicago grain elevator business. They were interlocked in a business pool, each owning part interest in each of the others. This allowed them to fix prices and engage in fraudulent grading, dishonest weighing, mixing grades, restricting competition, hiding storage information, and issuing false receipts. Joseph Medill, whose newspaper made warehouse regulation its cause, wrote:

The fifty million bushels of grain that pass into and out of the city of Chicago per annum, are controlled absolutely by a few warehouse men and the officers of railways. They form the grand ring, that wrings the sweat and blood out of the producers of Illinois. There is no provision in the fundamental law standing between the unrestricted avarice of monopoly and the common rights of the people; but the great, laborious, patient ox, the farmer, is bitten and bled, harassed and tortured, by these rapacious, blood sucking insects.

The Munn & Scott firm was both a prime cause of complaints and a leader in the fight against effective control by the CBT. In the summer of 1872, the firm was found to have cheated clients using multiple methods. It was learned that Munn & Scott grain receipts totaling 300,000 bushels were not backed by grain. Had the Munn & Scott matter been allowed to take its course, it would have created a panic which would have extended throughout the whole Northwest. Armour, a silent partner in the firm, purchased the Munn interests for $10 and set about purchasing grain to make its receipts good.

When a reporter from The Tribune interviewed him on the subject, Armour declined to say anything in reference to it, but requested as a special favor that no noise be made about it in the paper. He said he had merely done his duty, and that it might interfere with the country's business if it were written up in the newspapers.

By this time, the Munn & Scott firm had gone bankrupt in a grain speculation deal, and Ira Munn and George Scott both found that they were now strictly employees of Armour himself.

In the same year, Munn & Scott was charged with violating new Illinois regulations that enabled the state to inspect and regulate the elevators. Munn and his company achieved lasting attention in 1876–77, when the US Supreme Court in Munn v. Illinois rejected Munn's argument that the state had no right to regulate privately owned enterprises such as grain elevators.

Following the demise of Munn & Scott and the enactment of new laws and the addition to CBT regulations, public criticism of the "warehousemen" appears to have diminished. Fraudulent behavior and attempts to corner markets continued to occur, but these appear to have been the actions of individual operators rather than a continuation of the earlier structural problems in the warehousing system.

== Personal, political and philanthropic life ==
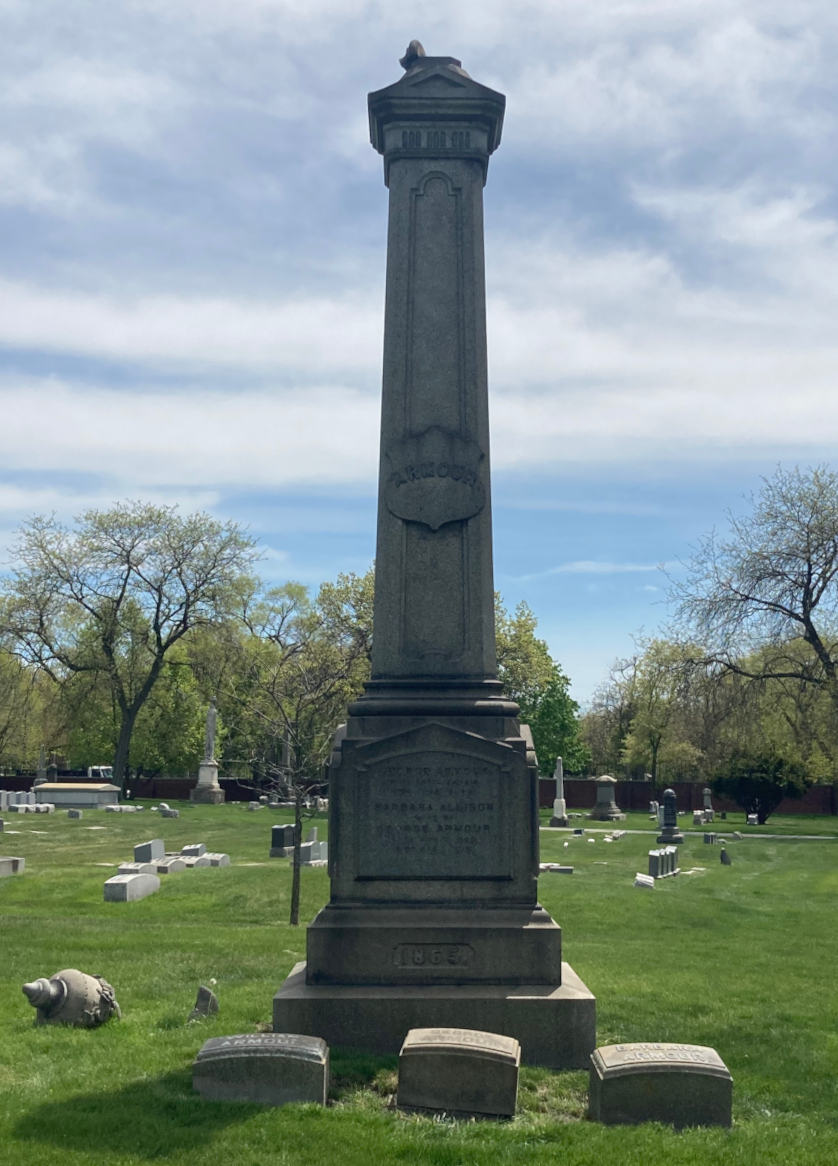
Armour's grave at Graceland Cemetery

Armour married Barbara Allison (1826–1898) in the early 1850s. She was born in Aberdeen, Scotland and emigrated to Chicago when she was very young. Their first son John was born in 1851. The first Armour home was on Michigan Avenue near Monroe Street.

The Great Chicago Fire disrupted Armour's personal life. He lost his house, his church, his children's school. He also lost civic projects he had dedicated much time to, including the YMCA, the Seaman's Bethel and Chicago Academy of Design.

After the Chicago Fire, the family built and moved into a new house at 1945 South Prairie Avenue in 1872. They also had a summer house in Waukegan, IL.

While on a voyage to Europe – made with the hope of improving his health – Armour died of rheumatism of the heart in Brighton, England on 13 June 1881. His body was returned to the US and he was buried at Graceland Cemetery in Chicago.

=== The arts ===
==== Gallery ====
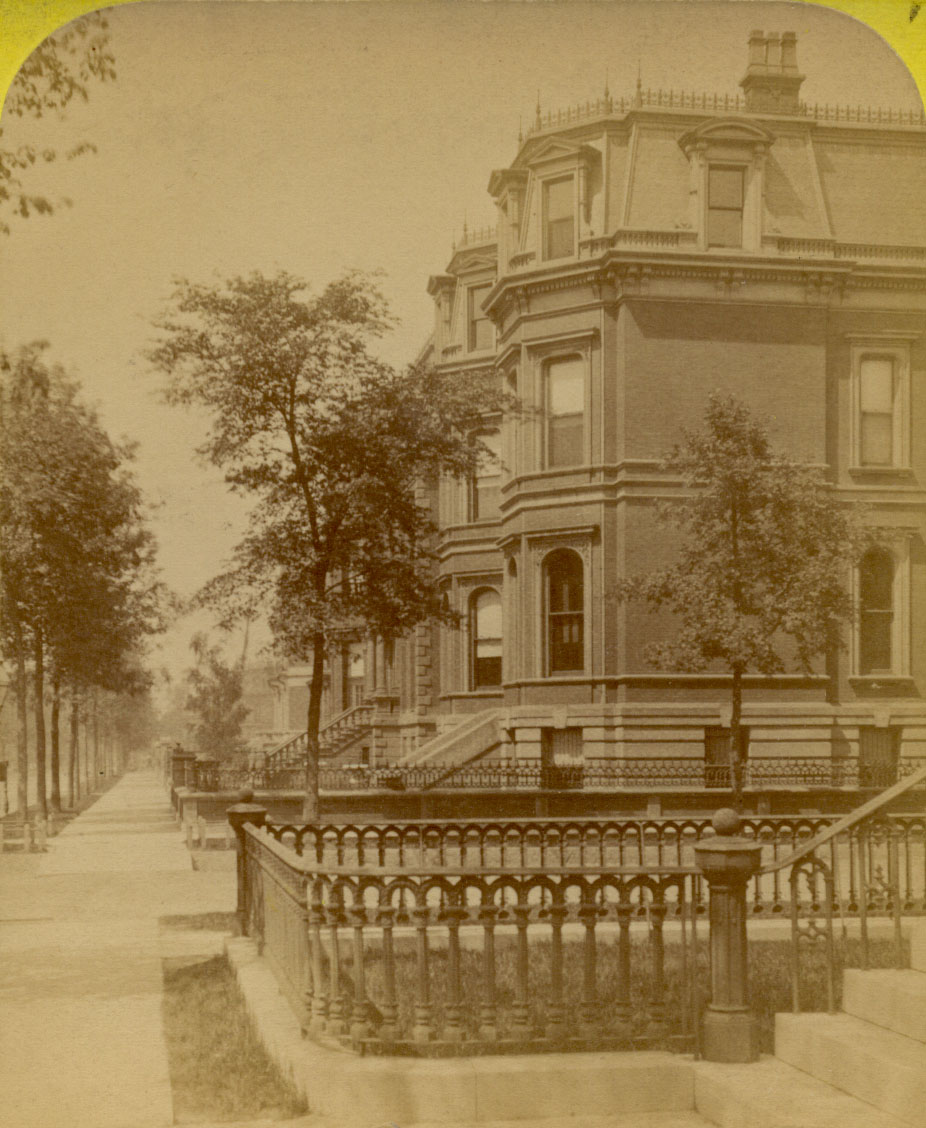
Armour residence at 1945 Prairie Avenue, Chicago. IL

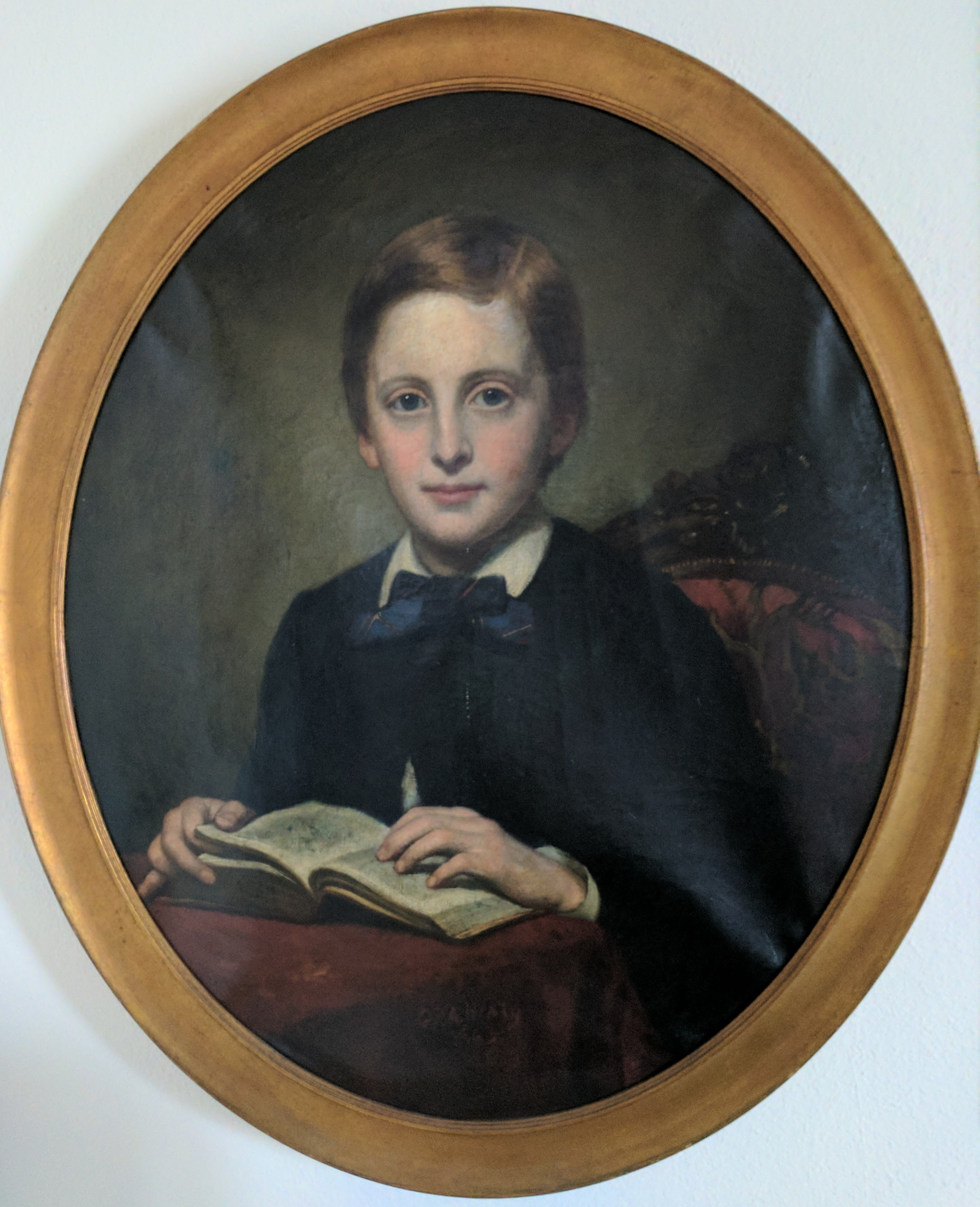
Portrait of John William Armour by G P A Healy, 1863

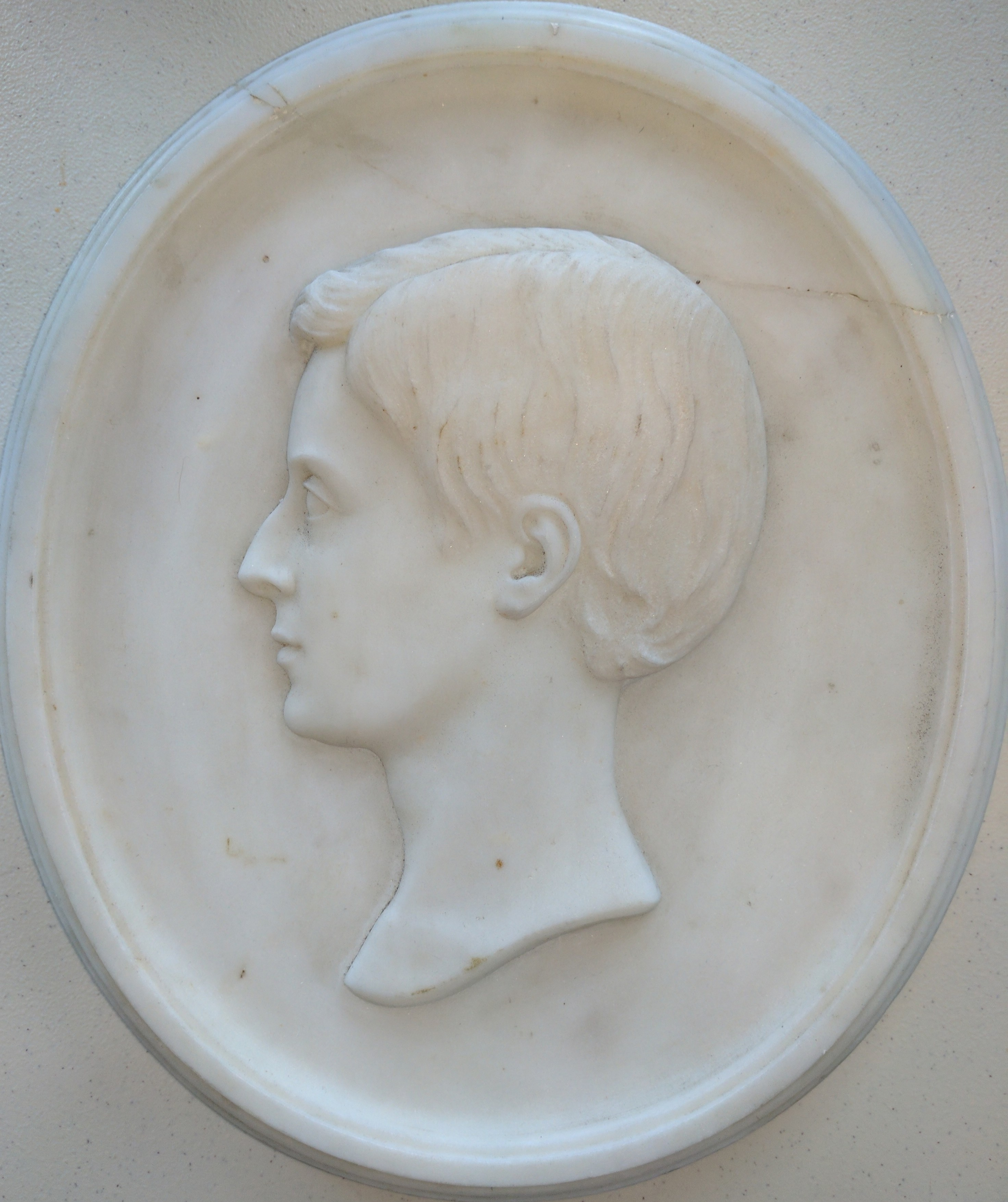
Bas-relief of John William Armour, 1865

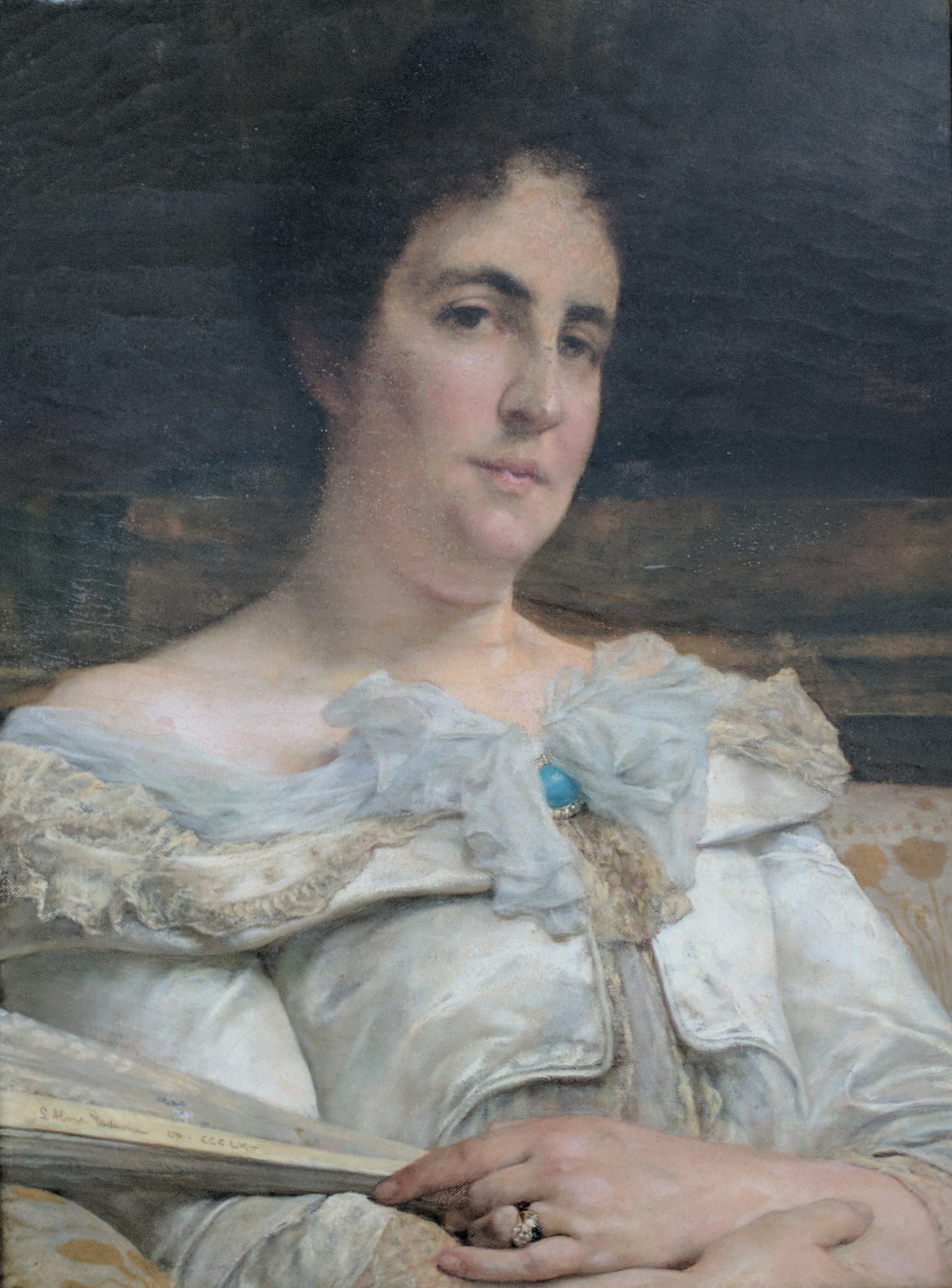
Portrait of Barbara Allison Armour by Sir Lawrence Alma Tadema, 1865

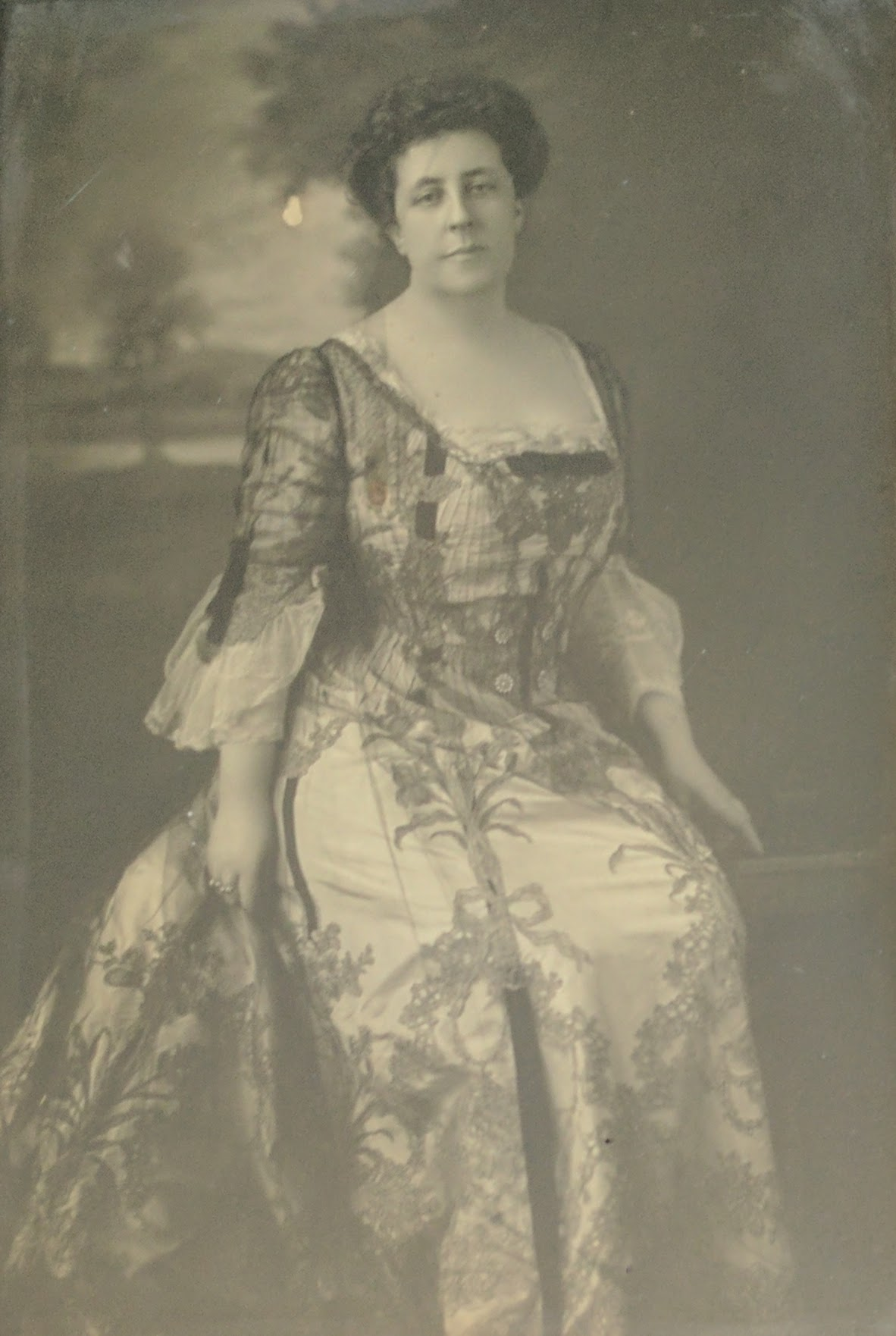
Photograph of Barbara Allison Armour, circa 1860

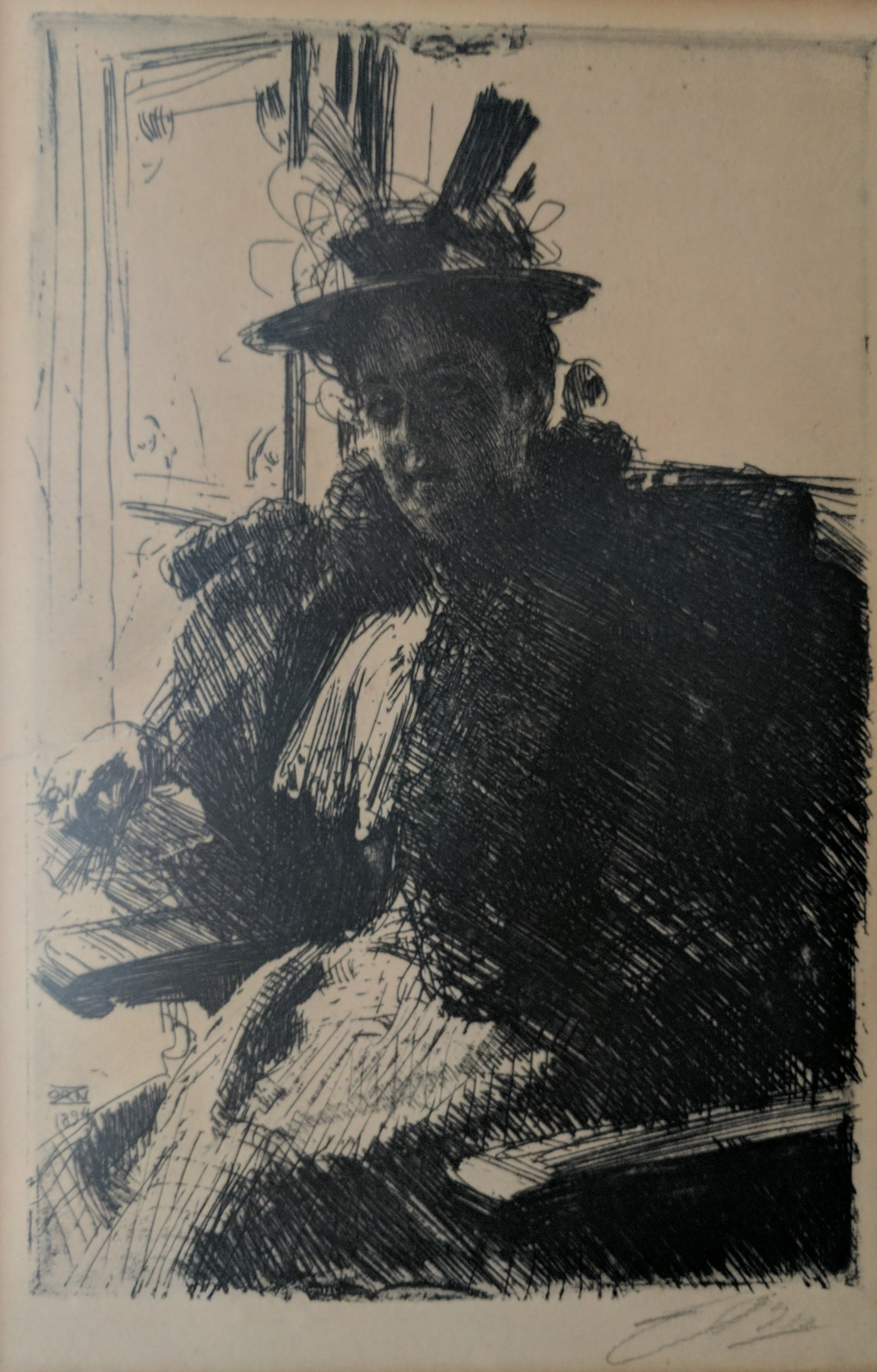
Portrait of Barbara Allison Armour by Anders Zorn, 1894

By the 1850s, the population of Chicago grew to over 110,000 inhabitants. The population included artisans, artists and art patrons.

Examples of interest in the arts in Chicago at the time include:

- In 1855 William B Ogden invited George Peter Alexander Healy to visit Chicago. Healy was an American portrait painter who lived and painted in Chicago for the next fourteen years
- The first major art exhibition was held in 1859 and attracted over 12,000 visitors.
- The construction of Crosby's Opera House

The Armours became collectors and patrons connected to this milieu. Their son John Armour died on 16 May 1865 of a rheumatic heart condition. Some time before that, John's portrait was painted by Healy. Prior to his death, the Armours traveled to Europe hoping to cure John. While in Europe a bas-relief bust of John was sculpted. Also on that voyage a portrait of Barbara Allison Armour was painted by Sir Lawrence Alma-Tadema in London in 1865.

Armour's partner James H Dole had been active with the Chicago Academy of Design, was a founder of the Chicago Academy of Fine Arts and supported the Art Institute until his death in 1902.

Armour was a founder and elected first President of the Chicago Academy of Fine Arts in 1879. The academy changed its name to the Art Institute of Chicago in 1882.

The formation of the Institute and its origins in the Chicago Academy of Design are detailed by A T Andreas in his History of Chicago – From the Earliest Period to the Present Time. The takeover of assets is discussed by Joel S. Dryer in a presentation titled The Story You Don't Know About A Place We All Love delivered to The Chicago Literary Club 14 May 2001. Further research has been carried out by Kirsten M. Jensen in her book: The American Salon: The Art Gallery at the Chicago Interstate Industrial Exposition, 1873—1890.

=== Church obligations ===
Armour was active with the Second Presbyterian Church and along with his good friend Norman Williams – a prominent Chicago lawyer. He was a trustee and an elder of the church. The first church was destroyed in the Chicago Fire of 1871. A new church was completed by 1874. Armour donated the tower which was completed in 1884 after Armour's death.

Armour donated $500 toward the construction of the Willow Creek Presbyterian Church in Argyle, IL in 1877.

=== Civic duties ===
On 22 March 1858, Chicagoans again gathered in an attempt to form a YMCA. After a series of meetings, a constitution was written and the first YMCA of Chicago was officially formed. Armour was a founder and trustee of the YMCA of Chicago.

Armour was a founder and member of the Commercial Club of Chicago in 1878. A group of successful Chicago businessmen, the Commercial Club promoted the economic development of the city, holding regular meetings to discuss civic reform issues of the day.

Armour dedicated a Fountain in Campbeltown, Scotland – his birthplace – in 1881. See below.

Armour was attacked during the elections of 1857. Widespread "rioting and knockdowns" were reported in the predominantly Irish-Democratic 7th Ward in the final days of the 2 March 1857 mayoral election. The Illinois Police & Sheriff's News described the event as follows:

A Republican businessman named George Armour challenged the votes of some Irishmen who did not reside within ward boundaries. Armour was set upon by a crowd of poll-watching ruffians, kicked, beaten about the head, and dragged through the streets by the hair until his friends came to the rescue. Another Wentworth worker was not nearly so lucky. He was attacked, stabbed, and chased clear down to La Salle Street where he jumped onto a dangerously thin sheet of river ice to escape his pursuers. The man escaped but not before one of the 7th Ward Irishers crashed through the ice and drowned in the bone-chilling waters of the Chicago River.

The only political position Armour ever held was that of elector in the Electoral College for the Hayes ticket in 1876. His right to hold the place was challenged at the time, on the grounds that he had never been naturalized and was consequently ineligible. If true this would have lost Illinois one of her votes and tied the result in the Electoral College. Armour was able to find a record of his naturalization, and he cast his vote along with his colleagues, for Hayes and Wheeler.

== Legacy ==
=== Commemorations ===
==== Fountain ====
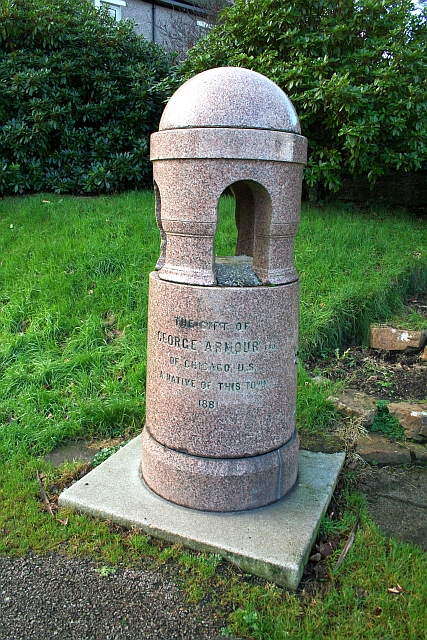
Fountain in Campbeltown, Scotland

The inscription reads: "the gift of George Armour, Esq, of Chicago US, a native of this town, 1881"

==== Tower ====
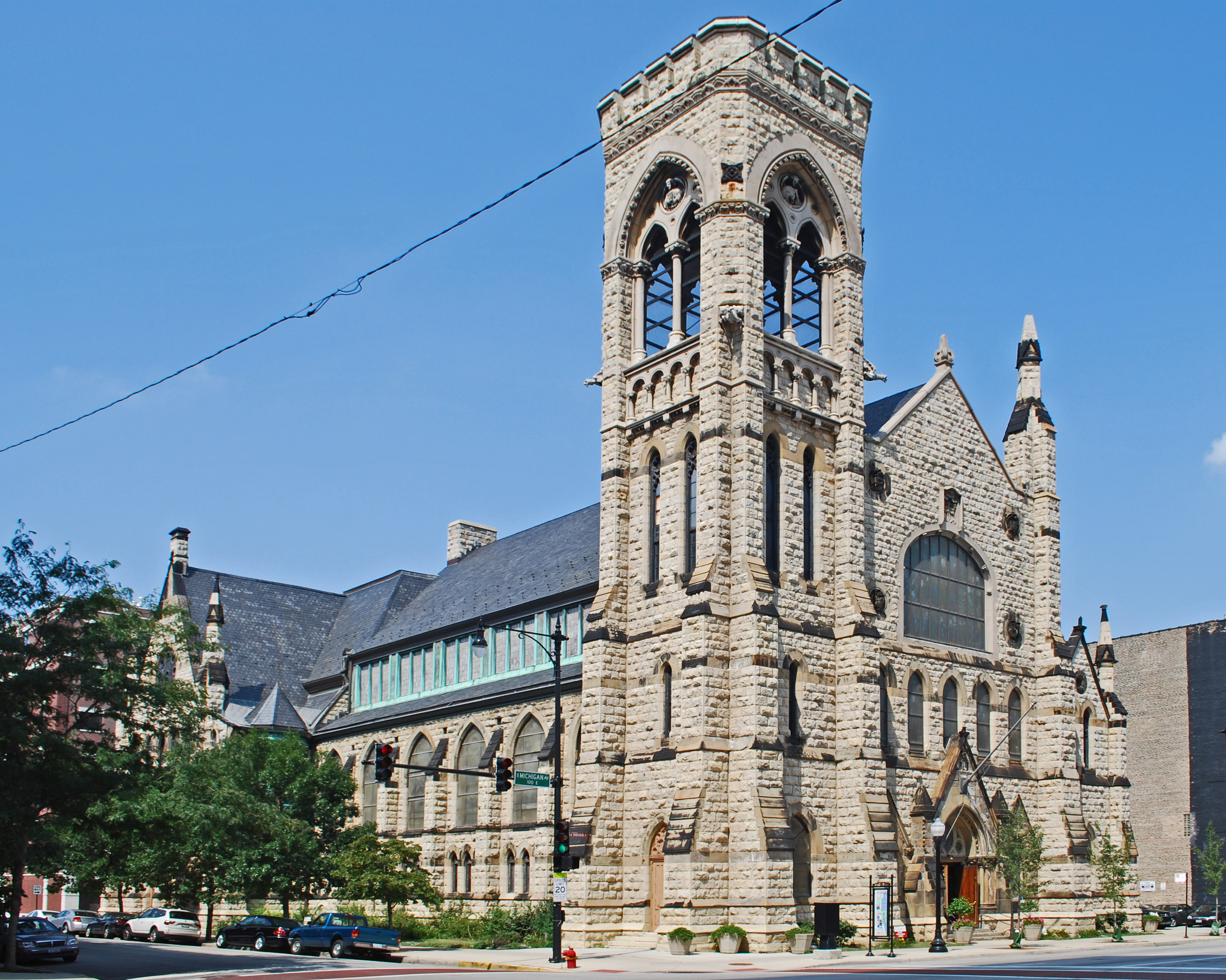
Second Presbyterian Church Chicago, IL

The tower and bell were donated to the church and dedicated to George Armour by his family in 1884.

==== Streets ====
- Armour Road
  Namesake: George Armour
  Location: Princeton, New Jersey
  40.3447675°N 74.6718538°W
- Allison Road
  Namesake: Barbara Allison Armour
  Location: Princeton, New Jersey
  40.34602°N 74.6752012°W
- Campbelton Road
  Namesake: George Armour birthplace
  Location: Princeton, New Jersey
  40.3458205°N 74.6724415°W

=== Commercial and cultural ===
==== Confusion with Philip Armour ====
George Armour is frequently mistaken for a brother or relative of Philip Danforth Armour, the meatpacking magnate, though the two were unrelated.

Examples of web sites and books that erroneously indicate George Armour was closely related to Philip Danforth Armour include the following:

- cootershistorything.blogspot.com/2014/08/armour-dole-company-of-chicago.html
- articles.chicagotribune.com/1994-08-31/business/9408310113_1_merchants-savings-grand-banking-hall-lasalle-street
- chsmedia.org/househistory/namechanges/start.pdf
- arcchicago.blogspot.com/2013/06/chicago-jewel-unhidden-inside-shaws.html
- https://books.google.com/books?id=l8qJI3ak-UsC&pg=PA446
- https://books.google.com/books?id=_Vn1AwAAQBAJ&pg=PA86

==== Industry-standard grading and inspection ====
Michael Pollan, American author, journalist, activist, and professor of journalism at UC Berkeley, wrote in The Omnivore's Dilemma:

Commodity corn, which is as much an economic abstraction as it is a biological fact, was invented in Chicago in the 1850s.
...

The breakthrough came in 1856, When the Chicago Board of Trade instituted a grading system. Now any number 2 corn was guaranteed to be as good as any other number 2 corn.
...
No one could foresee it at the time, but the Chicago Board of Trade's decision redirected the evolution of Zea mays.

Zea mays is the predominant type of corn used in the production of high-fructose corn syrup.

==== Futures ====
The CBT authorized the futures contract for wheat in 1865. Futures contracts for commodities are now traded on exchanges around the world. The CBT is today a component of CME Group, one of the largest derivatives exchange operators, which traded approximately 3.53 billion contracts in 2015.

==== A seat on the board ====
In 1876, while Armour was president of the CBT, membership in the CBT changed from being "by invitation only" to being a seat that could be bought and sold.

==== Site selection for warehouses ====
Having worked on railroads and canals in the US, Armour understood the value of building warehouses at the junction of the two modes of transport. Grain elevators built at rail-and-water junctions remain common in bulk transport infrastructure today.

==== Civil War fundraising ====
At the beginning of the Civil War, a meeting was called by the CBT to fund the establishment of a military unit to support the Union side. Most Union volunteer units were infantry, but the CBT sponsored an artillery unit, which used equipment made in Chicago by CBT members' own manufacturing operations.

==== Non-sectarian support ====
Armour was a Presbyterian and an elder of his church. He was also involved with civic institutions open to people of multiple faiths. Armour was a trustee of Farwell Hall – which housed the early Chicago YMCA – in 1861 and was elected a director of the YMCA itself in 1867. The YMCA of Metro Chicago today operates 23 centers, five camps and hundreds of extension sites, serving more than 200,000 members annually.

He also appears to have been involved with what is now the Bethel African Methodist Episcopal Church, Chicago's third oldest Black church.

==== Art of this country ====
In the 19th century, museums in East Coast cities largely imported European works and works by American artists trained in Europe. Chicago's approach differed: in 1879, with Armour as its first president, the Art Institute of Chicago was founded as a museum built upon an art school, the School of the Art Institute of Chicago. The school trained students to create art; the museum displayed their work.

==== Willow Creek Church ====
Armour contributed to the construction of the Willow Creek Church in Argyle, Illinois, near where he had spent the summer of 1836 building a log cabin. He returned to Campbeltown in the 1880s and donated funds to build a fountain there.

==== Coverage in contemporary sources ====
Andreas' History of Chicago, the MLTC's Fifty Years of Banking in Chicago, Taylor's History of the Board of Trade of the City of Chicago, and the Encyclopaedia of Biography of Illinois each mention Armour multiple times but do not include a standalone biography for him.

== Descendants ==
- Son: Allison Vincent Armour
- Grandson: Norman Armour

== See also ==
- Chicago, Rock Island and Pacific Railroad and associated song Rock Island Line
- CME Group
- School of the Art Institute of Chicago
