= 300 West Adams Building =

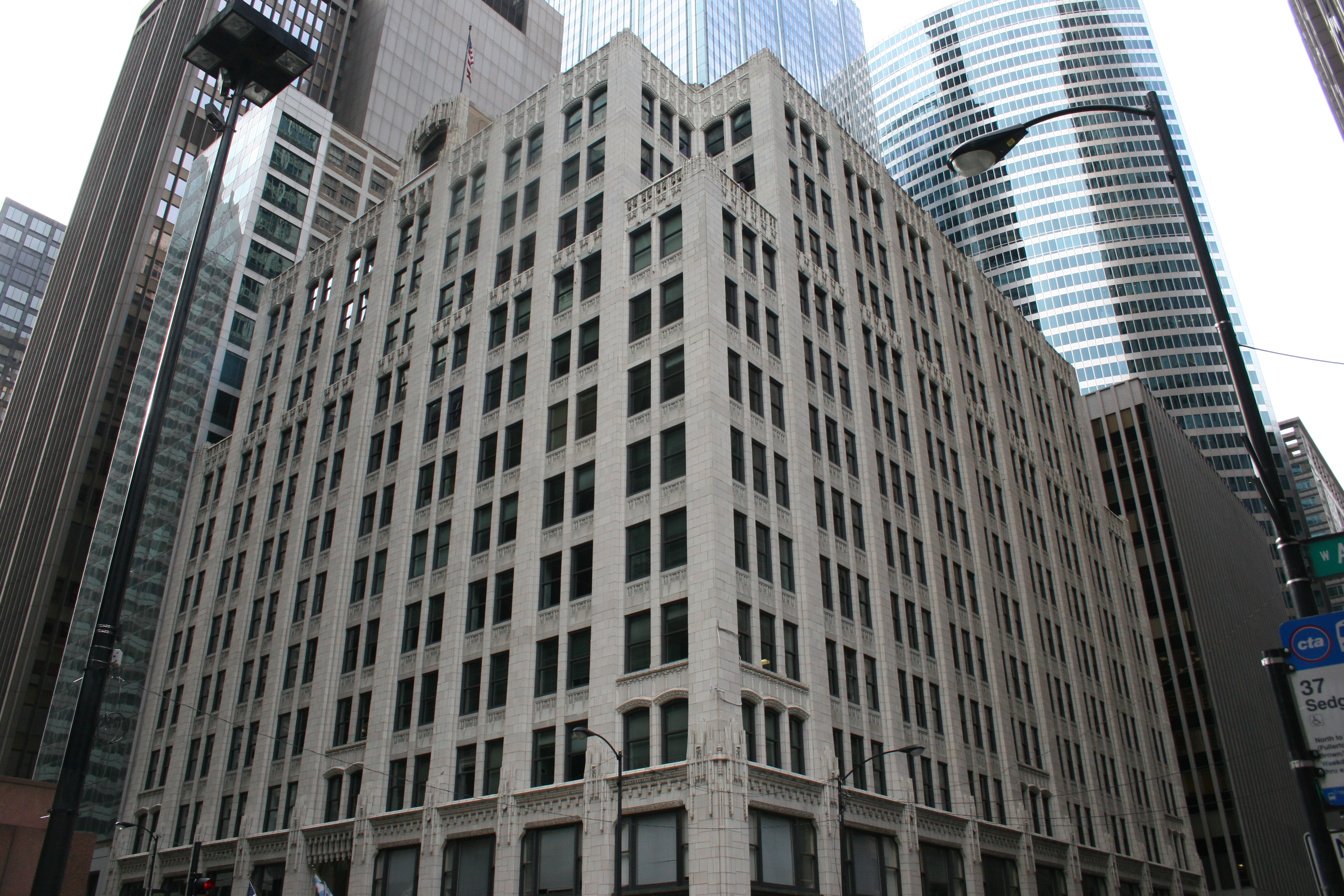
- Building from North East corner

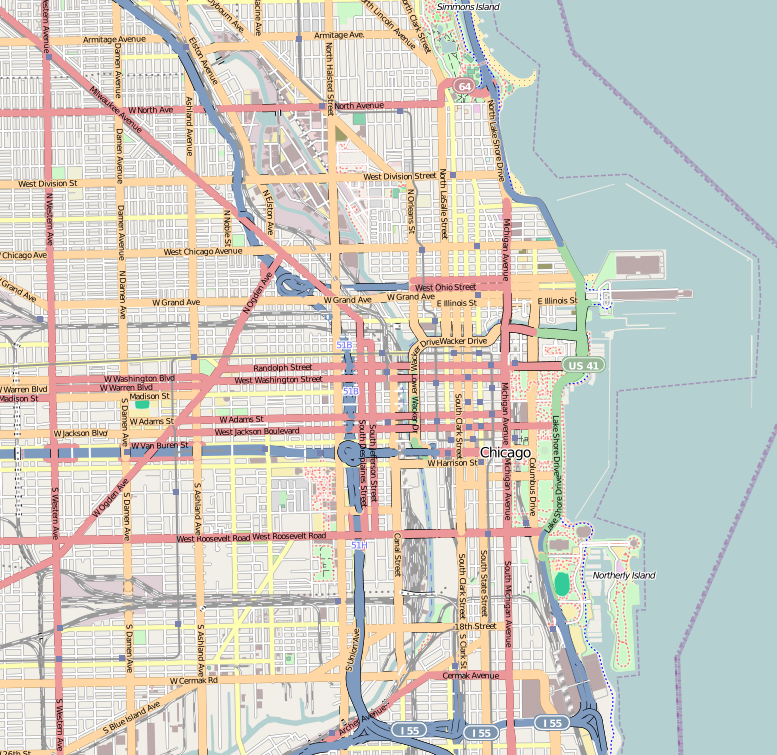
- Location within Central Chicago Location within Illinois Location within the United States

General information
- Architectural style: Gothic Revival
- Location: Chicago Loop, Illinois, United States
- Coordinates: 41°52′47″N 87°38′09″W
- Completed: 1927
- Owner: Alliance HSP
- Landlord: Adams Management LLC, Stone Real Estate Corp

Technical details
- Floor count: 12

Design and construction
- Architect: Jens J. Jensen
- Main contractor: McLennan Construction Company

Website
- http://www.300adams.com/#

The 300 West Adams Building (also 300 West Adams Street) is an office building in the West Loop area of Chicago, Illinois, United States. The twelve-story building was designed in the Gothic Revival architectural style, with architectural terracotta cladding. Built in the 1920s, the building was developed as part of the outward expansion of Chicago's business district from its historic core into former warehouse districts along the Chicago River.

== Early history ==
Before the Chicago Fire, the area directly along the river was predominantly commercial warehouses. In April 1879, one such warehouse was constructed at the northwest corner of Adams Street and Franklin Street on the site of today's 300 West Adams. Originally it was built for the Armour-Dole Grain Company. Later the building was converted into a wholesale store for Carson Pirie Scott and Company. By 1905, the warehouse was surrounded by similar structures.

As commercial real estate pressure increased, the area saw a trend of redevelopment. With the completion of Union Station in 1925, Carson Pirie Scott began plans to create office space in place of their warehouse. In January 1926, Carson Piri Scott announced that their wholesale building at Adams and Franklin would be remodeled into a "High class office building," while retaining its six-story height. Only a few months later, the plan was revised to include the demolition of the existing structure and its replacement with an entirely new twelve-story office building.

Before ground had broken on the site, substantial space had already been leased to the U.S. Gypsum Co.; the R.G. Dun & Co.; the Transportation Freight Bureau, and the General Chemical Co.

The architect Jens J. Jensen was awarded the contract to design the 12 story gothic revival structure. Prior to this, Jensen's work was predominately limited to low slung office and retail buildings in the Chicago area. The McLennan Construction company was the general contractor, and the building was completed by April 1, 1927.

Recently, the building has been the subject of numerous legal battles between real estate partners after the building sold in late 2023 for $4 million. The case filed alleges that Igor Gabal misappropriated funds relating to an insurance payout from the building and withheld them from his partner, Ruben Espinoza, who filed the suit.
