= Edward H. Bennett =

American architect (1874-1954)

Edward Herbert Bennett
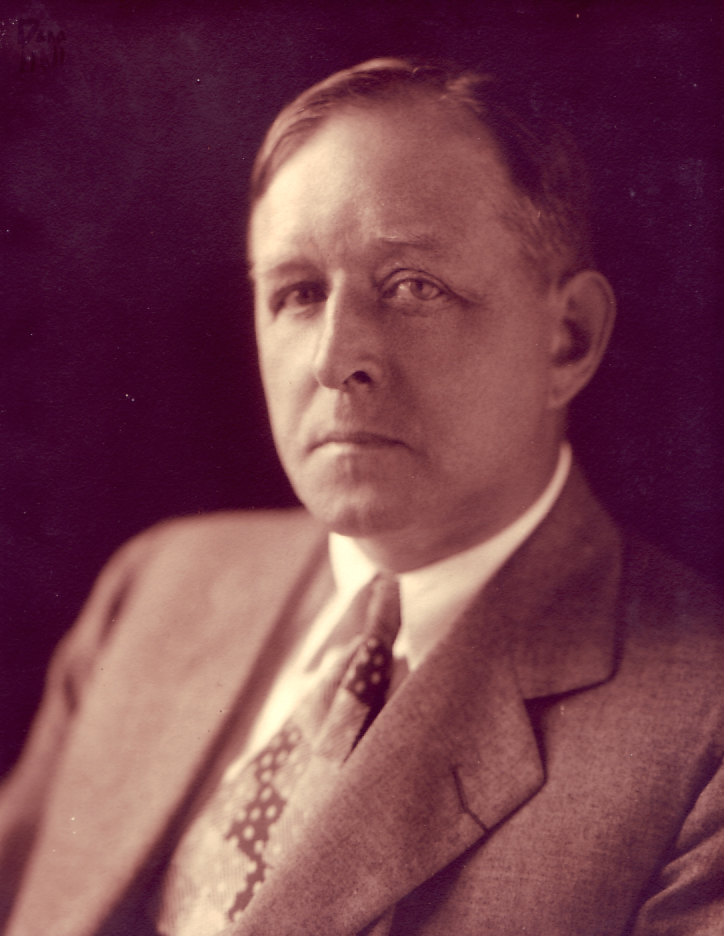
- Edward H. Bennett
- Born: May 12, 1874; Bristol, England
- Died: 1954 (aged 79–80); Chicago, Illinois, United States
- Occupations: Architect & city planner
- Spouse: Catherine Jones
- Children: 1

Edward Herbert Bennett (1874–1954) was an architect and city planner best known for his co-authorship of the 1909 Plan of Chicago.

== Biography ==
Bennett was born in Bristol, England on May 12, 1874, and later moved to San Francisco with his family. While an employee of Robert White, he was encouraged by famous architect Bernard Maybeck to pursue his education in Paris at the École des Beaux-Arts, which he attended from 1895 to 1902 thanks to the generosity of Phoebe Apperson Hearst. The training and friendships he made at the École shaped his entire career.

After graduating, he worked for a short time in New York City for prominent architect George B. Post, who sent him to Chicago to assist architect Daniel H. Burnham in preparing a plan for the military academy at West Point. Burnham found Bennett's work highly satisfactory and in 1903 invited him to move to Chicago to collaborate on the comprehensive plan for San Francisco, and afterwards, the Plan of Chicago. The completed San Francisco plan was not implemented in the aftermath of the 1906 earthquake, but Bennett became well known for his design work and co-authorship of the 1909 Plan of Chicago. While Burnham raised money and visibility for the Chicago Plan, Bennett created the actual layouts and drawings which are so well known today.

Bennett also trained with Chicago's then leading country house architect Howard Van Doren Shaw.

Bennett made Chicago his personal and professional headquarters for the rest of his career. He served on the Chicago Plan Commission in various capacities into the 1930s and developed a substantial private practice and a national reputation as a city planner. Burnham, who largely retired from active practice after 1905, other than for his work in Chicago, directed applicants to Bennett, who, with partners William E. Parsons (1872–1939) and Harry T. Frost (1886–1943), served as a planning consultant to many cities large and small. In the plan for Chicago, Burnham and Bennett created a working document giving substance to the City Beautiful philosophy. From this prototype Bennett developed comparable plans for numerous American cities, including Minneapolis, Detroit, and Portland, Oregon. He also prepared the first Canadian comprehensive plan, the 1915 plan for Ottawa and Hull.

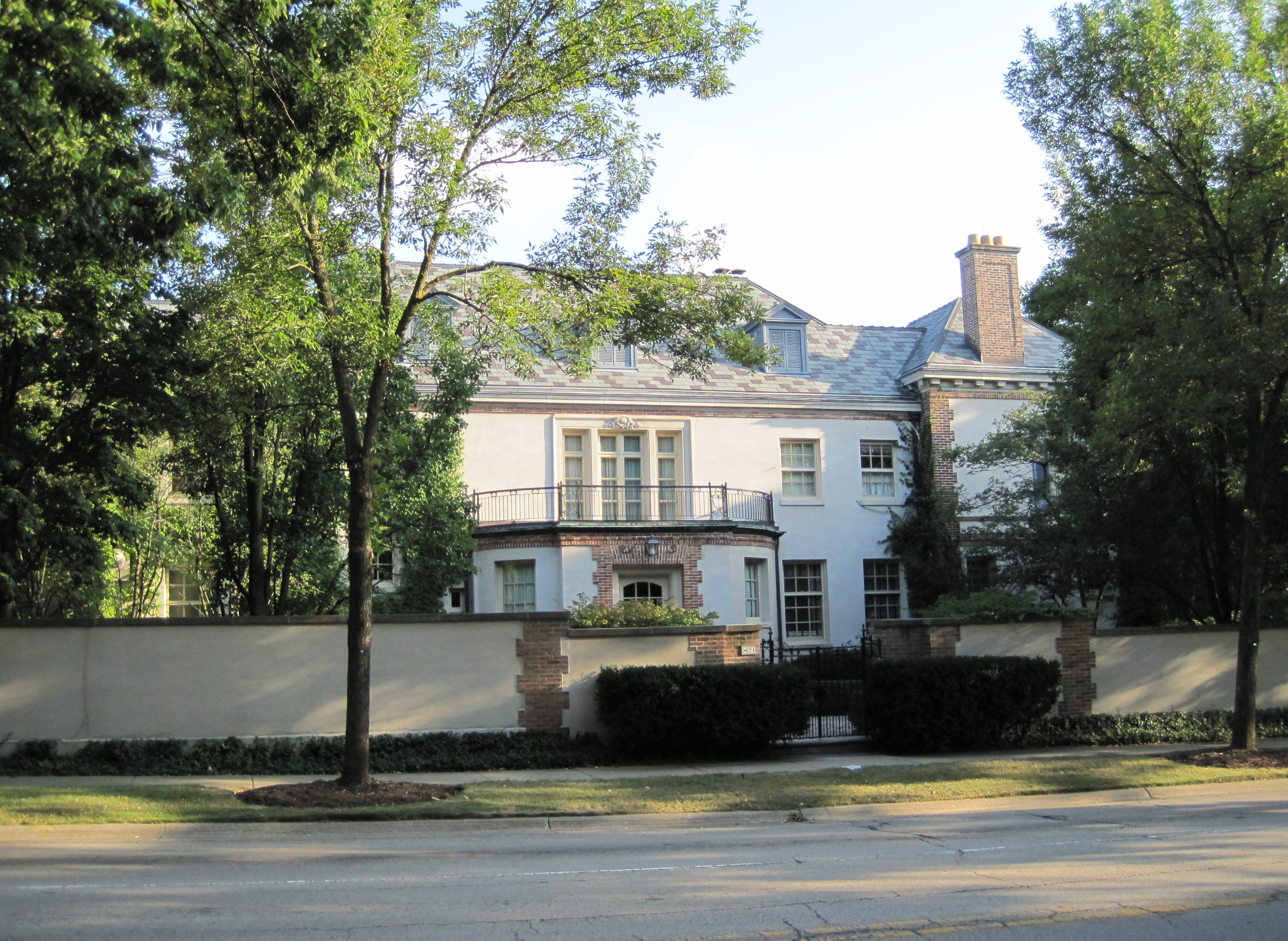
Bennett's house in Lake Forest, Illinois

Bennett married Catherine Jones from the prominent Lake Forest Jones family. They had one son, E. H. Bennett Jr., who was also an architect. In 1916 Bennett designed and built their estate, Bagatelle, on the northeast corner of the original Jones estate. The house still stands at the corner of Deerpath and Green Bay Roads in Lake Forest. Bagatelle is an interpretation of the Château de Bagatelle in Paris's Bois de Boulogne. Its classical garden with central fountain echos the design of Grant Park and Buckingham Fountain on Chicago's lakefront. He also owned Deerpath Farm, a dairy farm and country retreat on 160 acres (0.65 km^{2}) just west of Lake Forest which he gave to his son, and which now remains intact as the Deerpath Farm conservation community.

For many years, Bennett's office was located in the penthouse of the Santa Fe building at 80 E. Jackson in Chicago. From this vantage point he could supervise the construction of Grant Park, which he designed as part of the Plan of Chicago, and its structures including Buckingham Fountain and the original Peristyle in today's Millennium Park. His son E. H. Bennett Jr. later occupied this same office through the late-1960s.

Bennett's firm was a pioneer in the creation of zoning ordinances and the study of transportation and regional planning as urban design tools. He usually served on a consultant basis, frequently for quasi-public or commercial interests such as the Commercial Club of Chicago. His vision of the city was formed in the application of Beaux-Arts design principles of axiality and the incorporation of monumental public buildings as civic markers, coupled with a systematic ordering of functions for efficiency.

After World War I, the nature of planning work changed. Fully three-quarters of the Bennett firm's work done in the 1920s was for official city planning agencies rather than for independent business or civic groups. With the Great Depression, Bennett's volume of work declined. From the late 1920s, he was involved in planning for the 1933 Chicago Century of Progress Exposition, and designed a number of structures for it. From 1927 until 1937, Bennett served as Chairman of the Board of Architects responsible for the development of the Federal Triangle in Washington, DC, a large complex of government buildings between the White House and the United States Capitol built to house a number of Federal agencies, including what is now the National Archives and Records Administration.

Although most of his life's work reflected the Beaux Arts tradition, Bennett also designed two known modernist structures, one a personal studio on the south grounds of the Bagatelle estate, and the other a house in the artist colony of Tryon, North Carolina.

After the retirement and death of his partners, Bennett closed his practice in 1944 and spent the final decade of his life in retirement. In the course of his career, Bennett had worked in nearly 20 states, from California to Florida, as well as in Puerto Rico and Canada.

He presented his papers to The Art Institute of Chicago in 1953, and these were supplemented by additional gifts and bequests from his architect son, Edward H. Bennett, Jr., over the following two decades. In 2008 Edward Bennett's Grandson, Edward Bennett III donated a substantial collection of Bennett's personal papers, drawings and photographs including his personal notebooks for the Plans of Chicago and San Francisco to Lake Forest College.

== Works ==
- 1909 Plan of Chicago
- Buckingham Fountain - Chicago, IL
- Michigan Avenue Bridge - Chicago, IL
- Peristyle at Millennium Park (original) - Chicago, IL
- Civic Center Park - Denver, CO
- 1915 Plan for Ottawa
- Luis Muñoz Rivera Park - San Juan, Puerto Rico
- Louis Pasteur Memorial, Chicago
