= Merchants Club =

The Merchants Club was a predecessor club to The Commercial Club of Chicago. It was organized in Chicago in 1896. It merged with the Commercial Club in 1907. Its leaders included Charles G. Dawes, Frederic A. Delano, and Charles H. Wacker. It was responsible for commissioning Daniel Burnham's Plan of Chicago (1909), also known as Burnham's plan.
