= Wal Armour =

Australian rules footballer

Personal information
- Full name: Walter Edward Armour
- Born: 28 April 1921; Carlton, Victoria
- Died: 10 May 1995 (aged 74)
- Original team: Northcote Seconds / RAAF
- Height: 183 cm (6 ft 0 in)
- Weight: 82 kg (181 lb)

Playing career^{1}
Years	Club	Games (Goals)
1944–46	St Kilda	33 (36)
- ^{1} Playing statistics correct to the end of 1946.

Walter Edward Armour (28 April 1921 – 10 May 1995) was an Australian rules footballer who played with St Kilda in the Victorian Football League (VFL).

== Personal life ==
Anderson served as a private in the Australian Army during the Second World War.
