= Roger Armour =

British vascular surgeon and inventor (1934–2020)

Roger Hanif Armour (19 August 1934 – 17 September 2020) was a British vascular surgeon and inventor of the lens-free ophthalmoscope.

== Life ==
Roger Armour was born on 19 August 1934 in Murree in Northern India (subsequently in Pakistan). His father was a veterinary surgeon and his mother taught English.

He graduated MBBS from the King Edward Medical College, Lahore in 1956. He then settled in Britain, qualifying ChM, FRCSEd, FRCSEng, MRCP and DTM&H. After training posts in neurological surgery, cardiac and thoracic surgery, and ophthalmology he specialized in general and vascular surgery. He studied vascular and micro-vascular surgery at Nashville and Zurich respectively as Hamilton Bailey Prize-winner (1973–74). He was consultant surgeon in Birkenhead at St Catherine's Hospital and Birkenhead Children's Hospital, and in Wallasey (1969-1972), and then at the Lister Hospital, Stevenage (1972-1996).

Armour lived in Hitchin, Hertfordshire with his wife Gillian. He has three children: Jasmin, Sara and Steven. His brother, David S. Ahmed, was consultant surgeon and Vice President of Medical Services, Regina Qu'Appelle Health Region, Canada.

== Ophthalmoscope ==
After retiring Armour made a lens-free direct ophthalmoscope. Armour was made FRCP London in 2018.
