= Jody Armour =

American professor

- Born: United States
- Citizenship: United States
- Occupations: Academic, law professor

Academic background
- Education: Harvard University, University of California, Berkeley

Academic work
- Discipline: Law
- Institutions: University of Southern California
- Notable works: N*gga Theory: Race, Language, Unequal Justice, and the Law, Negrophobia and Reasonable Racism: The Hidden Costs of Being Black in America
- Website: jodyarmour.com

Jody David Armour is an American academic. He is the Roy P. Crocker Professor of Law at the University of Southern California, where he specializes in race issues in legal decision-making.

== Life and career ==
Armour came to study law after his father was set up and imprisoned when Armour was 8 years old.

Armour graduated from Harvard University and the UC Berkeley School of Law.

He also teaches torts, criminal law, and criminal procedure.

== Selected publications ==
- N*gga Theory: Race, Language, Unequal Justice, and the Law, Los Angeles Review of Books, 2020. ISBN 9781940660684, OCLC 1129018774
- Negrophobia and Reasonable Racism: The Hidden Costs of Being Black in America, New York University Press, 1997. ISBN 9780814706404, OCLC 42700643
