= Commercial Club of Chicago =

US nonprofit organization

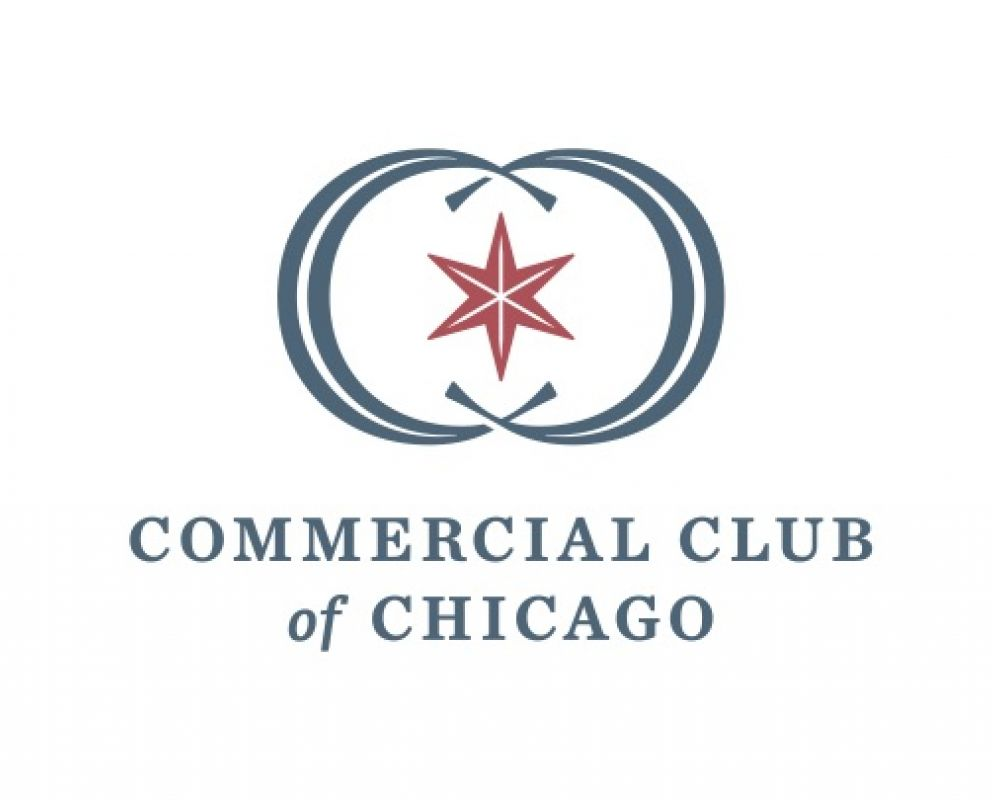
- Established: 1877; 149 years ago
- Type: Nonprofit
- Tax ID no.: 36-2197847
- Location: Chicago, United States
- Region served: Chicago metropolitan area
- Chair: Jennifer F. Scanlon
- Vice Chair: E. Scott Santi
- President: Kelly R. Welsh
- Revenue: $3.5M USD (2020)
- Expenses: $3.6M USD (2020)
- Staff: 14 (2020)
- Website: commercialclubchicago.org

The Commercial Club of Chicago is a nonprofit 501(c)(4) social welfare organization founded in 1877 with a mission to promote the social and economic vitality of the metropolitan area of Chicago.

== History ==
The Commercial Club was founded in 1877 as a capitalist reaction to the Great Upheaval, a national labor strike that began with railroad workers in Martinsburg, West Virginia. In 1907, the Commercial Club merged with the Merchants Club (organized in 1896). In 1933, the Industrial Club of Chicago (organized in 1905) joined. Its most active members included George Pullman, Marshall Field, Cyrus McCormick, George Armour, Frederic Delano, Sewell Avery, Rufus C. Dawes, and Julius Rosenwald. The club championed member Daniel Burnham's Plan of Chicago (1909), also known as Burnham's plan. The plan gave the blueprint for the future growth and development of the entire Chicago region.

== Activities ==
The Commercial Club addressed many other progressive reform issues: supported street cleaning and paving projects, smoke abatement and sanitation schemes, and the development of city parks and playgrounds. They also endorsed the creation of the Cook County Forest Preserve district.

They also maintained a consciousness of social reform issues like juvenile delinquency, race relations, and old-age pensions.

The club traces its origins back to the 17 founding members of the Commercial Club in 1877. The current chairman is Jennifer F. Scanlon and the current president is Kelly R. Welsh.

== Criticism ==
The Civic Committee of the Commercial Club has often come under criticism for pursuing an unrealistic zeal for cutting the constitutionally protected pensions of state employees in Illinois. Former president Tyrone C. Fahner stated that some members had talked to bond ratings agencies about lowering Illinois' bond rating to create more pressure for pension reform.
