= Armour's Warehouse =

- U.S. National Register of Historic Places
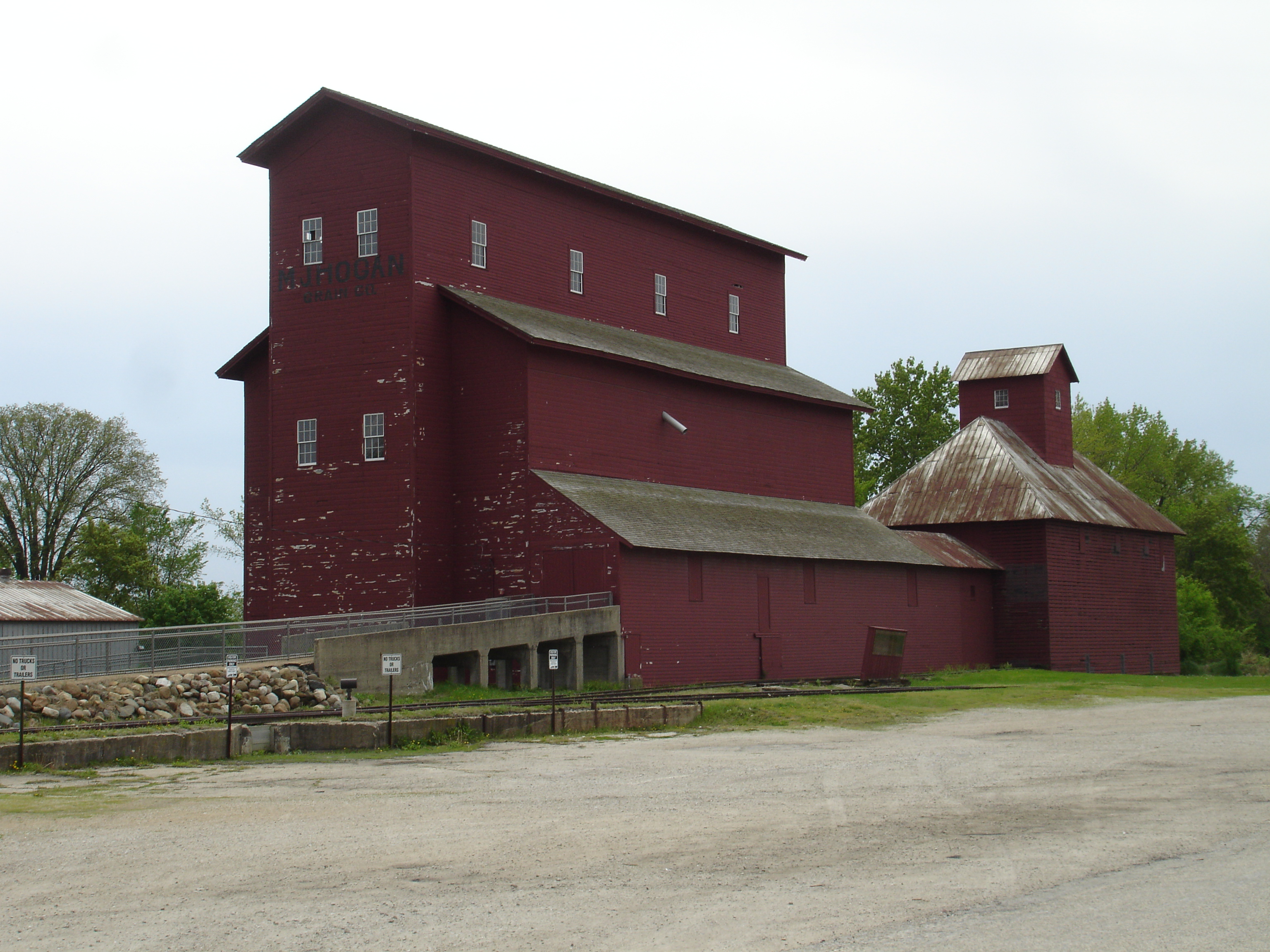

- Location within Illinois Location within the United States
- Location: Jct. of William and Bridge Sts., Seneca, Illinois
- Coordinates: 41°18′54″N 88°36′42″W
- Area: 1.4 acres (0.57 ha)
- Built: 1861
- Architectural style: Grain elevator
- NRHP reference No.: 97001333
- Added to NRHP: November 7, 1997

Armour's Warehouse, also known as the Seneca Grain Elevator or the Hogan's North Elevator, is a historic grain elevator located in the village of Seneca, Illinois, United States. The elevator and two surrounding outbuildings were listed on the U.S. National Register of Historic Places in 1997.

== History ==
The grain elevator, known as Armour's Warehouse, was constructed in 1861–62 on the north bank of the Illinois-Michigan Canal in Seneca, Illinois. It was built by John Armour and remained in the Armour family for a short time before passing through different owners. Though not the first grain elevator in Seneca, it is the only historic grain elevator still standing in the village.

== Design ==
The Seneca Grain Elevator consists of a 65-foot (20 m) grain elevator or "elevating warehouse" which rises four stories above its basement. The 40-foot (12 m) by 80-foot (24 m) structure dominates the site and overlooks downtown Seneca. Between 1924–39 corrugated metal siding was added to the building as a fire prevention measure.

== Outbuildings ==
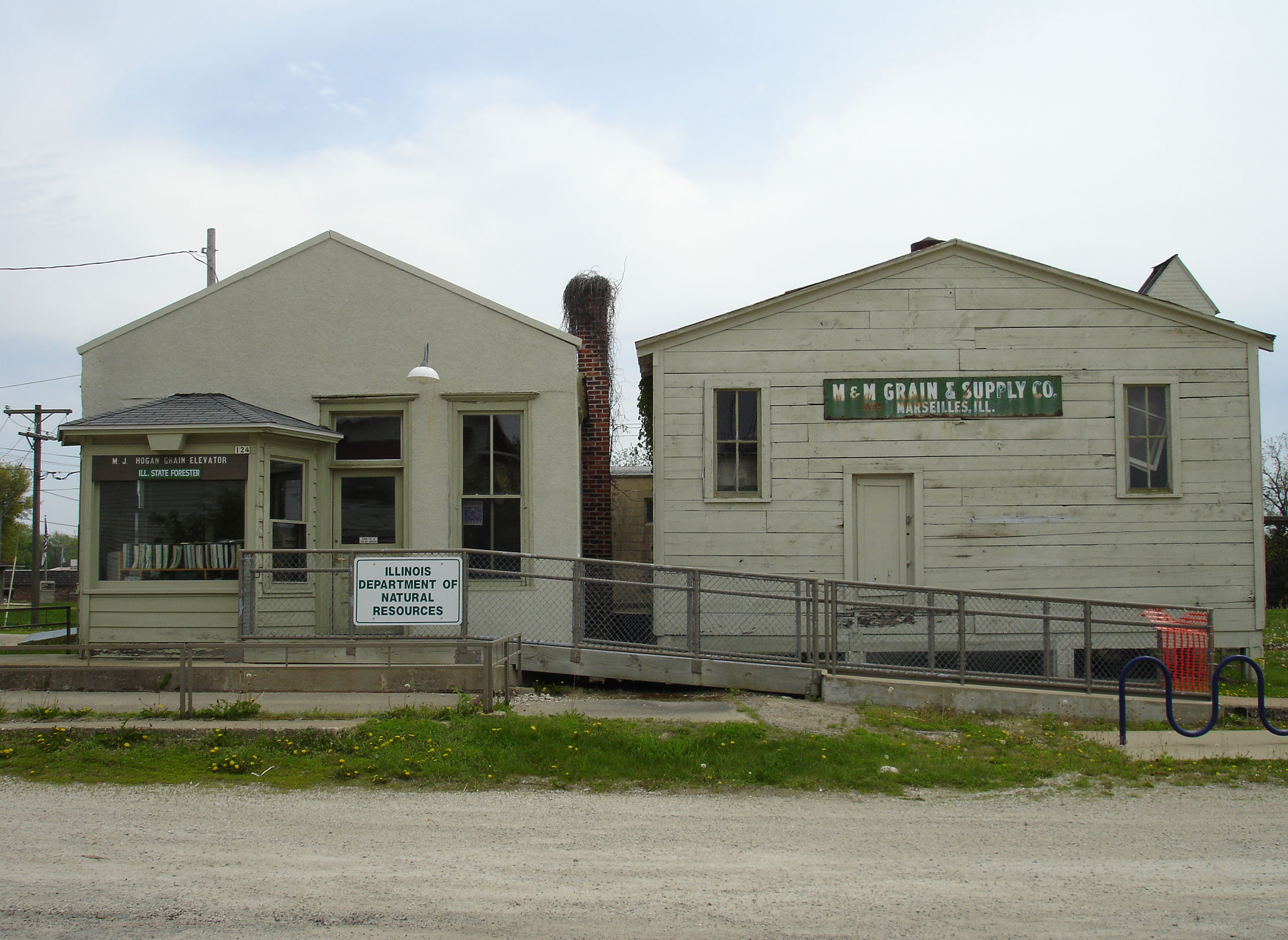
The 1892 office and scale house, a contributing property.

In total there are five separate buildings, including the grain elevator, on the site of Armour's Warehouse. An 1883 spur of railroad track remains on the north side of the elevator; the tracks lead to a dump shed connected to a c. 1940 corn crib. Also on the property are an office with an attached scale house dating from 1892, and two seed warehouses. One seed warehouse dates from after 1947 while the other dates from the earlier 1940s.

== Historic significance ==
The Seneca Grain Elevator is the oldest remaining grain elevator along the banks of the Illinois-Michigan Canal, a U.S. National Historic Landmark District. It is historically significant in a local context commercially and in attracting the railroad to Seneca. On a broader level, it illustrates the economic importance of the Illinois-Michigan Canal for transporting grain products. Armour's Warehouse was added to the U.S. National Register of Historic Places on November 7, 1997. Included in the listing as contributing properties were the 1892 office building and attached scale house, and the older of the two seed warehouses.
