= Robert Armour =

Canadian businessman and publisher (1781–1857)

- Born: June 13, 1781; Kilmarnock, Scotland
- Died: April 16, 1857 (aged 75); Montreal, Canada
- Occupations: Businessman, Publisher
- Known for: Co-founding the Bank of Montreal, Owning the Montreal Gazette
- Spouse: Elizabeth Harvie
- Children: 5
- Parents: Robert Armour (father); Jean Shaw (mother)

Robert Armour (June 13, 1781 – April 16, 1857) was a Canadian businessman and publisher. Born in Kilmarnock, Scotland, he immigrated to Montreal in 1798. He ran a merchandising business unsuccessfully, misspending public funds. In 1816 he joined with other Montreal businessmen to create the Bank of Montreal. In 1827 he was appointed to the office of the king's publisher and bought the Montreal Gazette. After selling his shares of the newspaper to his son's firm, he ran various dry goods firms.

== Early life and early career ==
Armour was born on June 13, 1781, in Kilmarnock, Scotland. His father was a shoemaker named Robert Armour, and his mother was Jean Shaw.

== Career ==
He arrived in Montreal in 1798. He worked as an auctioneer and was a partner in a merchants firm called Henderson, Armour and Company. He was appointed as a warden of Trinity House in 1815, a Montreal organisation that regulated the shipping industry along the St. Lawrence River. By 1815 he joined Montreal's 1st Militia Battalion and remained until 1821.

In 1816 he was appointed as a commissioner for improving inland navigation and became a partner in the Quebec Steamboat Company.

=== Montreal businesses ===
In 1816, Armour was facing legal problems as his merchandising business was failing financially and Armour had misspent over £5,000 in public funds. He joined with eight other Montreal businessmen to create the Bank of Montreal. Armour and a business partner were running a general store on St. Paul Street, but the store was financially unsuccessful and went into receivership. The bank negotiated to rent the property with the assignees to the property. It is unknown how Armour's financial struggles ended.

Two years later Armour was the cashier of Bank of Canada, an institution that was unsuccessful and bought by the Bank of Montreal in 1831. In 1820 he was in Montreal, selling insurance and dry goods, and owned shares in a steamboat called Car of Commerce, which travelled between Montreal and Quebec City. He was also a director for the newly built Montreal General Hospital.

=== Publishing career ===
In 1827, Armour was appointed to the office of the king's printer for Montreal. Later that year he used his children's inheritance from his deceased wife to purchase and invest in the Montreal Gazette. In 1828, he transferred ownership of the newspaper to his children as collateral while he repaid the money, and continued to operate the company. Ownership was transferred back to Armour when the debt was repaid. The Gazette aligned with the Tory political ideology, printing merchant complaints about the Constitutional Act 1791 and an increase of immigrants from Britain to Canada.

In 1828, Armour published editions of The Montreal almanack, or Lower Canada register, a paper that he created. That year he also helped organise British North America's first Mechanics' institute. In 1831, he joined with his son, Andrew Harvie, to form a publishing firm called Andrew H. Armour and Company. Armour was dismissed as the king's printer in 1832. Harvie dissolved his partnership with his father in 1835 to form a new firm with Harvie's brother-in-law and bought Armour's share of the Gazette.

=== Dry goods career ===
Armour continued to run a dry goods firm called Robert Armour and Company and in 1843 established a second firm with William Whiteford called Armour, Whiteford and Company. He was also a director for the Montreal Gas Light Company, the Montreal Fire Assurance Company, the City Bank of Montreal and the Montreal Provident and Savings Bank. In 1843 Armour was also translating documents for the Canadian government from French to English. He probably retired sometime in the 1850s.

== Personal life and death ==
Armour married Elizabeth Harvie in 1806. They had five children.

In 1815, Armour became the treasurer of the St Gabriel Street Church, a Presbyterian church, and became an elder of the church in 1819. When the church split in 1832, Armour went with Edward Black to create St Paul's Church.

Armour died on April 16, 1857, in Montreal.
