= Armour, Dole & Co. =

- Company type: Private
- Industry: Agriculture
- Founded: 1860; 165 years ago in Chicago, Illinois, USA
- Founders: George Armour, George W. Dole
- Defunct: 1884
- Fate: Acquired by Armour and Company (no relation)

Armour, Dole & Co. was a Chicago-based grain company that was founded in the 1860s, with George Armour as a principal.

== History ==
In the 1850s, Chicago foods trade business rivals George Armour and George W. Dole joined forces in the grain trade, forming the roots of Armour, Dole, & Co. The company became a leading player in the city's grain market, eventually building 10,000,000 bushels worth of grain storage in the city. The two business men had already operated grain elevators in Chicago before forming their partnership prior to their partnership.

After George W. Dole died in 1860, Armour joined with Charles Sydney Dole (a nephew of George W. Dole) and James Henry Doyle and Wesley Munger, together running Armour, Dole & Co. The company operated grain elevators at the depot of the CBQ with a capacity of 850,000 bushels

Between 1860 and 1867, the company built five grain elevators next to the Chicago, Burlington, and Quincy railyards (between Halsted Street and Loomis Street). These alone had a capacity of 850,000 bushels. After the American Civil War, Armour, Dole & Co. remained among the city's leading grain warehousers. Their elevators had a combined capacity of 2.1 million bushels in 1871. While several other operators' grain elevators burned during the Great Chicago Fire in 1871, Armour & Dole's grain elevators were unscathed by the conflagration. In 1872, the company announced plans for a million-bushel facility on the South Branch of the Chicago River. By the early 1880s, the company's facilities had grown to hold 6.3 million bushels.
