= 1883 in rail transport =

This article lists events related to rail transport that occurred in 1883.

== Events ==
=== January events ===
- January 10 – The Columbus, Chicago and Indiana Central Railway enters bankruptcy and is sold at foreclosure.
- January 12 – The second transcontinental railroad line in North America is completed as the Southern Pacific Railroad tracks from Los Angeles, California, meet the Galveston, Harrisburg and San Antonio at the Pecos River. The golden spike is driven by Col. Tom Pierce, the GH&SA president.
- January 29 – Narrow gauge Bridgton and Saco River Railroad opens to Bridgton, Maine.

=== February events ===
- February – Central Pacific Railroad completes construction of the largest locomotive in the world for its time, El Gobernador.
- February 23 – The Malta Railway, a metre gauge railway, opens between Valletta and Mdina.

=== March events ===
- March 30 – Construction on the Denver and Rio Grande Railroad reaches Salt Lake City, Utah.

=== May events ===
- May 5 – Construction of the Swanage Railway in England begins.

=== June events ===
- June 5 – The first Express d'Orient is operated between Paris and Vienna.

=== August events ===
- August
  - The Toledo, Cincinnati and St. Louis Railroad enters receivership.
  - The Atlantic and Pacific Railroad, later to become part of the Atchison, Topeka and Santa Fe Railroad, building westward from Albuquerque, New Mexico, reaches Needles, California.
- August 4 – Volk's Electric Railway, the first of its kind in Britain, opens at Brighton.
- August 11 – The California Southern Railroad receives a court order in its favor ordering the Southern Pacific Railroad (SP) to allow it to cross SP tracks at Colton, California.
- August 18 – Construction on the Canadian Pacific Railway reaches Calgary, Alberta.

=== September events ===
- September 5 – Narrow gauge Monson Railroad opens to Monson, Maine.
- September 8 – Northern Pacific Railway completes its connection to the Pacific coast in Washington Territory with a final spike ceremony at Gold Creek, Montana.
- September 13 – A month after a frog war with the Southern Pacific Railroad in Colton, California, the first California Southern Railroad train arrives in San Bernardino.
- September 28 – Formal opening of first electrified section of Giant's Causeway Tramway in Ireland, utilising hydroelectricity.

=== October events ===
- October 3–9 – Russian writer Ivan Turgenev's body is returned by train from Paris Gare du Nord to Saint Petersburg Varshavsky railway station with crowds turning out to honor him.
- October 4 – The first ever Express d'Orient passenger train service leaves Paris for Constantinople (now Istanbul) in the Ottoman Empire (Turkey), by way of Munich, Vienna, Budapest, Bucharest, Giurgiu, then, with passengers crossing the Danube by boat, a second train from Rustchuk to Varna, and from there by boat Espero to Constantinople. The train is officially renamed Orient Express in 1891.
- October 30 – Two Clan na Gael dynamite bombs explode in the London Underground.

=== November events ===
- November 18 – Standard time zones introduced on American and Canadian railroads, as agreed by the General Time Convention.

=== December events ===
- December 28 – Boston and Maine Railroad leases the Eastern Railroad in Massachusetts.

=== Unknown date events ===
- The National Railway Appliance Exhibition is held in Chicago, Illinois.
- William Henry Vanderbilt resigns from the presidency of the New York Central system and appoints his heirs to chairmanship positions in the system's constituent railroad companies. James H. Rutter succeeds Vanderbilt as president.
- Franklin B. Gowen retires from the presidency of the Philadelphia and Reading Railroad.

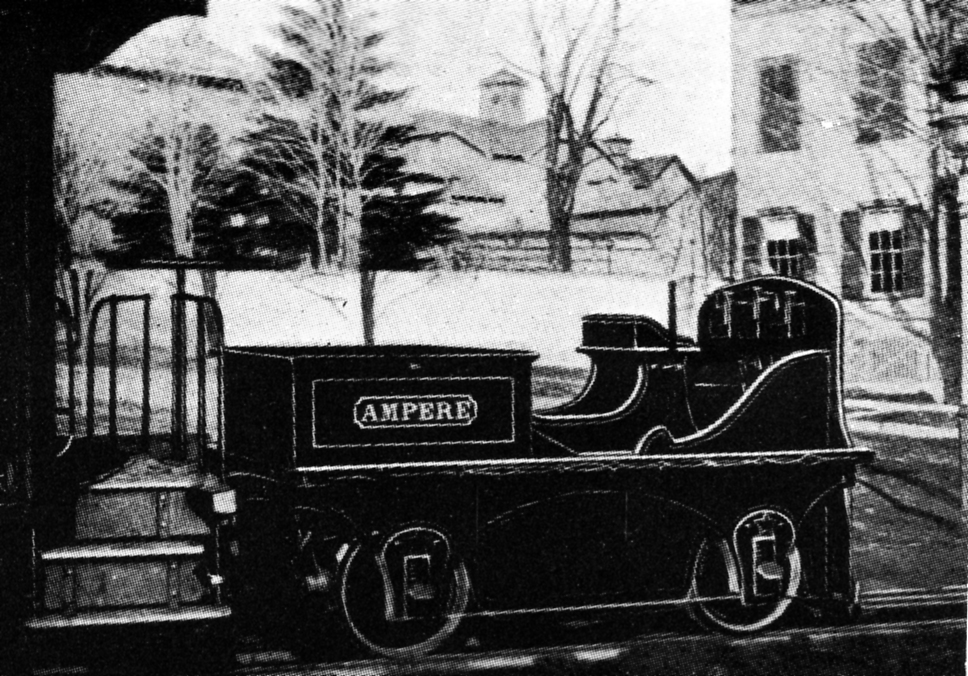
Experimental electric locomotive Ampère, built by Leo Daft in 1883

- First electric railways in North America: experimental lines at Toronto International Exhibition and by Leo Daft in Newark, New Jersey.
- Philip Armour founds Armour Refrigerator Line, as a subsidiary of his meatpacking firm Armour and Company, to operate refrigerator cars that will carry Armour meat products.
- The Colorado Midland Railway is incorporated.
- Chicago, Burlington and Quincy Railroad fully acquires the Hannibal and St. Joseph Railroad.

== Births ==
=== January births ===
- January 14 – William Valentine Wood, president of the London, Midland and Scottish Railway 1941-8 (d. 1959).

=== December births ===
- December 27 – Cyrus S. Eaton, president of the Chesapeake and Ohio Railway in the 1950s (d. 1979).

== Deaths ==
=== January deaths ===
- January 13 – Webster Wagner, founder of Wagner Palace Car Company, dies (b. 1817).

=== July deaths ===
- July 23 – Ginery Twichell, president of the Boston and Worcester Railroad beginning in 1857, president of the Atchison, Topeka and Santa Fe Railway 1870–1873 (b. 1811).
- July 24 – Thomas Swann, president of Baltimore and Ohio Railroad 1847–1853, dies (b. 1809).

=== October deaths ===
- October 4 – Henry Farnam, president of the Chicago, Rock Island and Pacific Railroad 1854–1863 (b. 1803).

=== Unknown date deaths ===
- William Swinburne, American locomotive designer and builder (b. 1805).
