= Herman Ossian Armour =

American businessman and philanthropist

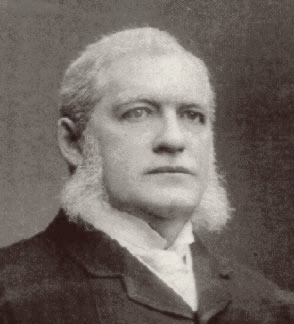
- Born: March 7, 1837; Stockbridge, New York, U.S.
- Died: September 8, 1901 (aged 64); New York City, U.S.
- Spouses: Mary Jacks (m. 1862–1870) Jane Livingston (m. 1887–1901)
- Children: 2
- Parents: Danforth Armour (1799 - 1873) (father); Juliana Brooks (1799 - 1879) (mother)
- Relatives: Philip Danforth Armour (brother); J. Ogden Armour (nephew); Alice de Janzé (great niece)

Herman Ossian Armour (March 7, 1837 – September 8, 1901) was an American businessman and philanthropist who with his brother, Philip Danforth Armour, co-founded the meatpacking firm of Armour & Company, which would exist as the nation's largest such company for much of the twentieth century.

Born the seventh of eight children in Stockbridge, New York, his parents were Methodists of English and Scottish ancestry. In 1865, Armour established the New York syndicate of Armour Meats under the name Armour, Plankinton & Co. This move was prompted by a series of restrictive laws regarding lines of credit in effect throughout most Midwestern states at the time. American forebear of the Armour family, Scotsman James Armour was among the earliest to settle in the newly established British colony of New Jersey, arriving just three years after its establishment in 1664, though settlers from Holland, Germany, Sweden, and France had been living in the area since 1614 in the former New Netherland and New Sweden (Nya Sverige) colonies. Armour died on September 8, 1901 at his New York City home and was laid to rest at the family mausoleum in Woodlawn Cemetery.

Armour was a delegate to the 1892 Republican National Convention and a presidential elector in the 1896 presidential election.

== See also ==
- Gustavus Franklin Swift
- The Four Hundred
