= Stockbridge, New York =

- Town
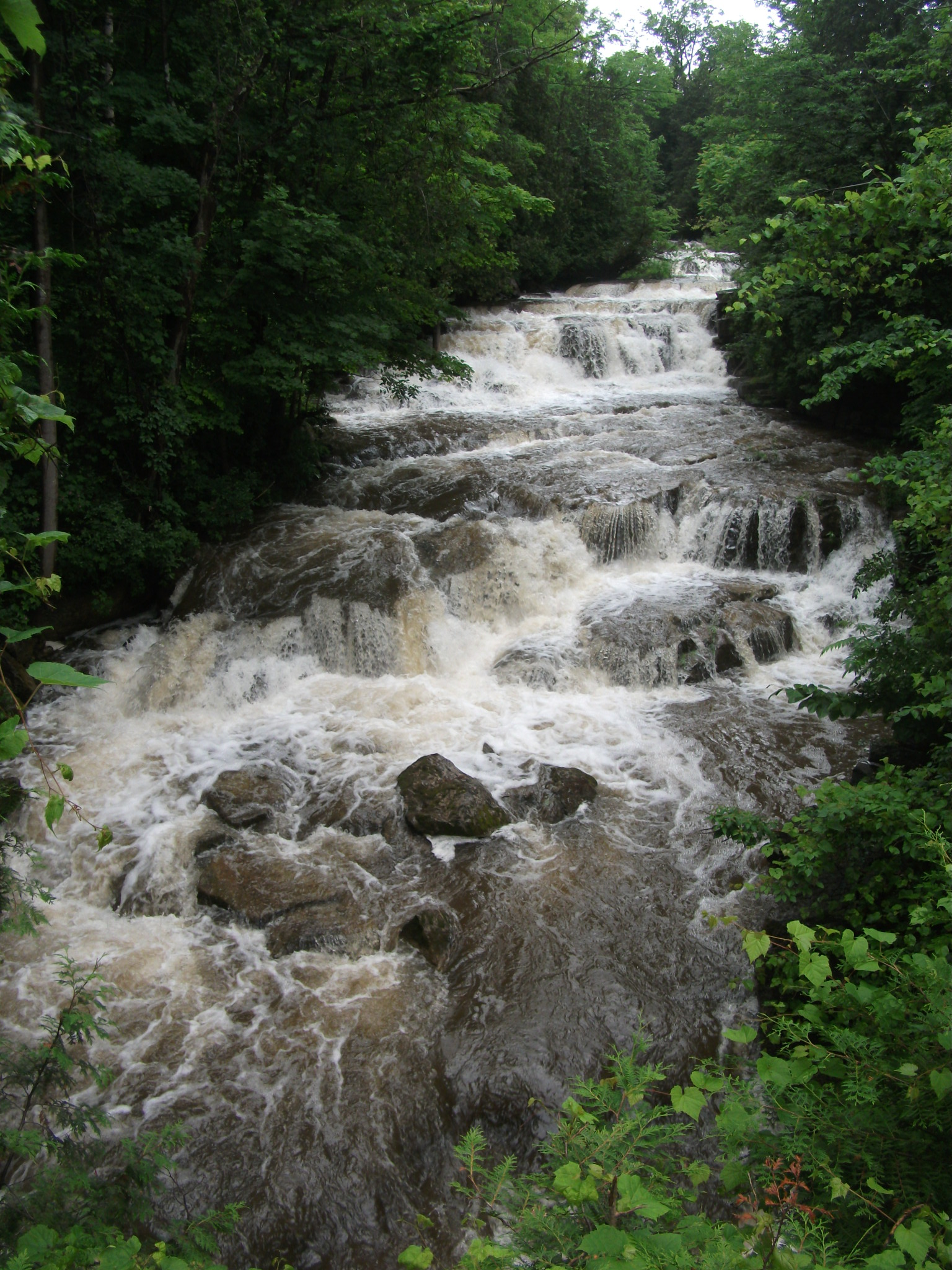
- Stockbridge Falls, June 2011

- Location within New York Location within the United States
- Coordinates: 42°59′N 75°35′W
- Country: United States
- State: New York
- County: Madison

Government
  - Type: Town Council
  - Town Supervisor: Alexander R. Stepanski (R)
  - Town Council: Members' List: • Roy E. Meeker (D); • Kenneth Frost (R); • Roland C. Shea Sr. (R); • James Strain (R)

Area
  - Total: 31.53 sq mi (81.66 km^{2})
  - Land: 31.53 sq mi (81.66 km^{2})
  - Water: 0 sq mi (0.00 km^{2})
- Elevation: 633 ft (193 m)

Population (2020)
  - Total: 1,972
  - Density: 62.5/sq mi (24.1/km^{2})
- Time zone: UTC-5 (Eastern (EST))
  - Summer (DST): UTC-4 (EDT)
- ZIP Codes: 13409 (Munnsville); 13402 (Madison); 13421 (Oneida)
- Area code: 315
- FIPS code: 36-053-71399
- GNIS feature ID: 0979527

Stockbridge is a town in Madison County, New York, United States. The population was 1,972 at the 2020 census, down from 2,103 in 2010. The name is derived from a group of Native Americans.

== History ==
The land surrounding where Stockbridge would be established was lived upon by "Stockbridge Indians" (as local settlers would refer to them), who had been relocated already to the New Stockbridge Indian Territory during the latter half of the 18th century, being told that this land was to be reserved for future tribal generations. The Stockbridge, refugees mainly of adjoining tribes in New York who had settled in the "praying town" of Stockbridge, Massachusetts, accepted an invitation of the Oneida people to live and share on their reservation in New York. Subsequent disagreements with White settlers caused many Stockbridge Indians to relocate to Indiana and later to Wisconsin, where they became the Stockbridge–Munsee Band of the Mohican Nation.

The town was settled in 1791 by pioneers from New England. The town was formed in 1836 from parts of four other towns: Augusta, Lenox, Smithfield and Vernon.

Stockbridge is the birthplace of meatpacking industrialist Philip Danforth Armour and his brother Herman Ossian Armour.

== Geography ==
Stockbridge sits along the eastern border of Madison County, with Oneida County to the east and north. The village of Munnsville is in the center of the town. New York State Route 46 crosses the town, passing through Munnsville and leading north 9 miles (14 km) to Oneida and south 11 miles (18 km) to Hamilton.

According to the U.S. Census Bureau, the town of Stockbridge has a total area of 31.5 square miles (82 km^{2}), all of it recorded as land. Oneida Creek, a tributary of Oneida Lake, flows northward through the center of town. The creek drops over Stockbridge Falls southwest of Munnsville.

== Demographics ==
Historical population
Census	Pop.	Note	%±
1840	2,320		—
1850	2,081		−10.3%
1860	2,068		−0.6%
1870	1,847		−10.7%
1880	2,023		9.5%
1890	1,845		−8.8%
1900	1,622		−12.1%
1910	1,485		−8.4%
1920	1,413		−4.8%
1930	1,369		−3.1%
1940	1,258		−8.1%
1950	1,537		22.2%
1960	1,574		2.4%
1970	1,711		8.7%
1980	1,947		13.8%
1990	1,968		1.1%
2000	2,080		5.7%
2010	2,103		1.1%
2020	1,972		−6.2%
U.S. Decennial Census

As of the census of 2000, there were 2,080 people, 739 households, and 571 families residing in the town. The population density was 65.7 inhabitants per square mile (25.4/km^{2}). There were 802 housing units at an average density of 25.3 per square mile (9.8/km^{2}). The racial makeup of the town was 96.63% White, 0.38% African American, 0.91% Native American, 0.29% Asian, 0.24% from other races, and 1.54% from two or more races. Hispanic or Latino of any race were 0.82% of the population.

There were 739 households, out of which 37.9% had children under the age of 18 living with them, 60.4% were married couples living together, 10.7% had a female householder with no husband present, and 22.6% were non-families. 17.9% of all households were made up of individuals, and 8.7% had someone living alone who was 65 years of age or older. The average household size was 2.81 and the average family size was 3.14.

In the town, the population was spread out, with 29.5% under the age of 18, 8.1% from 18 to 24, 29.6% from 25 to 44, 22.1% from 45 to 64, and 10.8% who were 65 years of age or older. The median age was 35 years. For every 100 females, there were 101.7 males. For every 100 females age 18 and over, there were 98.8 males.

The median income for a household in the town was $37,700, and the median income for a family was $41,250. Males had a median income of $30,701 versus $21,712 for females. The per capita income for the town was $15,856. About 9.9% of families and 12.9% of the population were below the poverty line, including 13.9% of those under age 18 and 12.3% of those age 65 or over.

== Communities and locations in Stockbridge ==
- Bridges Corners – A location in the southeastern part of the town.
- Five Chimneys Corner – A hamlet by the northern town line.
- Munns – A hamlet northeast of Munnsville. It was formerly called "Munnsyule."
- Munnsville – The village of Munnsville on Route 46.
- Stockbridge – The hamlet of Stockbridge on Route 46, north of Munnsville.
- Stockbridge Falls – A waterfall located southwest of Munnsville.
- Valley Mills – A hamlet northeast of Stockbridge village.
