= Munnsville, New York =

- Village
- Location within New York Location within the United States
- Coordinates: 42°58′36″N 75°35′18″W
- Country: United States
- State: New York
- County: Madison
- Town: Stockbridge

Area
  - Total: 0.88 sq mi (2.27 km^{2})
  - Land: 0.88 sq mi (2.27 km^{2})
  - Water: 0 sq mi (0.00 km^{2})
- Elevation: 659 ft (201 m)

Population (2020)
  - Total: 454
  - Density: 518.5/sq mi (200.19/km^{2})
- Time zone: UTC-5 (Eastern (EST))
  - Summer (DST): UTC-4 (EDT)
- ZIP Code: 13409
- Area code: 315
- FIPS code: 36-49220
- GNIS feature ID: 2391001

Munnsville is a village in the town of Stockbridge in Madison County, New York, United States. The population was 454 at the 2020 census. The village is named for an early settler, Asa Munn, and is located on New York State Route 46.

== History ==
Asa Munn opened a mercantile business in the community circa 1817.

In 1990 the village received national media attention and interviews by Connie Chung when a local dairy farmer, Delbert Ward, allegedly murdered his brother William Ward by suffocation. Delbert was found not guilty at trial. In 1992, this incident was examined in the documentary Brother's Keeper.

Munnsville became a popular racing location for skateboarding because of the Madison County Gravity Festival, which began in 2002. Skateboarders from all over North America and Europe descend on the village for the last weekend of July and race their skateboards at speeds up to 60 miles per hour (95 km/h).

The former Munnsville depot of the defunct (March 29, 1957) New York, Ontario & Western Railway is now a private residence, occupied by NYO&W historian and author John Taibi.

== Geography ==
Munnsville is located in eastern Madison County at 42°58′36″N 75°35′18″W (42.976597, -75.588236), in the center of the town of Stockbridge. New York State Route 46 passes through the village as Main Street, leading north 8 miles (13 km) to Oneida. The village of Hamilton is 11 miles (18 km) to the south via NY 46 and NY 12B.

According to the U.S. Census Bureau, the village of Munnsville has a total area of 0.88 square miles (2.28 km^{2}), all of it recorded as land. Oneida Creek passes through the center of the village, flowing northwards toward Oneida Lake at the northern edge of Madison County. The creek flows through the center of the Stockbridge Valley, with the valley sides rising 600 feet (180 m) to the west of Munnsville and more than 900 feet (270 m) to the east. Oneida Creek flows over Stockbridge Falls 2 miles (3 km) southwest of Munnsville as it enters the valley.

== Demographics ==
Historical population
Census	Pop.	Note	%±
1870	313		—
1880	329		5.1%
1920	377		—
1930	345		−8.5%
1940	357		3.5%
1950	412		15.4%
1960	391		−5.1%
1970	435		11.3%
1980	499		14.7%
1990	438		−12.2%
2000	437		−0.2%
2010	474		8.5%
2020	454		−4.2%
U.S. Decennial Census

As of the census of 2000, there were 437 people, 166 households, and 118 families residing in the village. The population density was 506.6 inhabitants per square mile (195.6/km^{2}). There were 176 housing units at an average density of 204.0 per square mile (78.8/km^{2}). The racial makeup of the village was 98.40% White, 0.46% African American, 0.23% Native American, and 0.92% from two or more races. Hispanic or Latino of any race were 0.69% of the population.

There were 166 households, out of which 34.3% had children under the age of 18 living with them, 53.0% were married couples living together, 12.7% had a female householder with no husband present, and 28.9% were non-families. 22.9% of all households were made up of individuals, and 12.7% had someone living alone who was 65 years of age or older. The average household size was 2.60 and the average family size was 3.04.

In the village, the population was spread out, with 26.5% under the age of 18, 8.5% from 18 to 24, 30.2% from 25 to 44, 23.1% from 45 to 64, and 11.7% who were 65 years of age or older. The median age was 36 years. For every 100 females, there were 92.5 males. For every 100 females age 18 and over, there were 93.4 males.

The median income for a household in the village was $35,000, and the median income for a family was $36,250. Males had a median income of $35,417 versus $21,250 for females. The per capita income for the village was $16,657. About 9.7% of families and 14.8% of the population were below the poverty line, including 15.2% of those under age 18 and 16.1% of those age 65 or over.

== Notable people ==
Munnsville was the final home of poet Hayden Carruth.

Munnsville is the birthplace of Bill Horr, who won silver and bronze at the 1908 Olympics.
