= Stockbridge Falls =

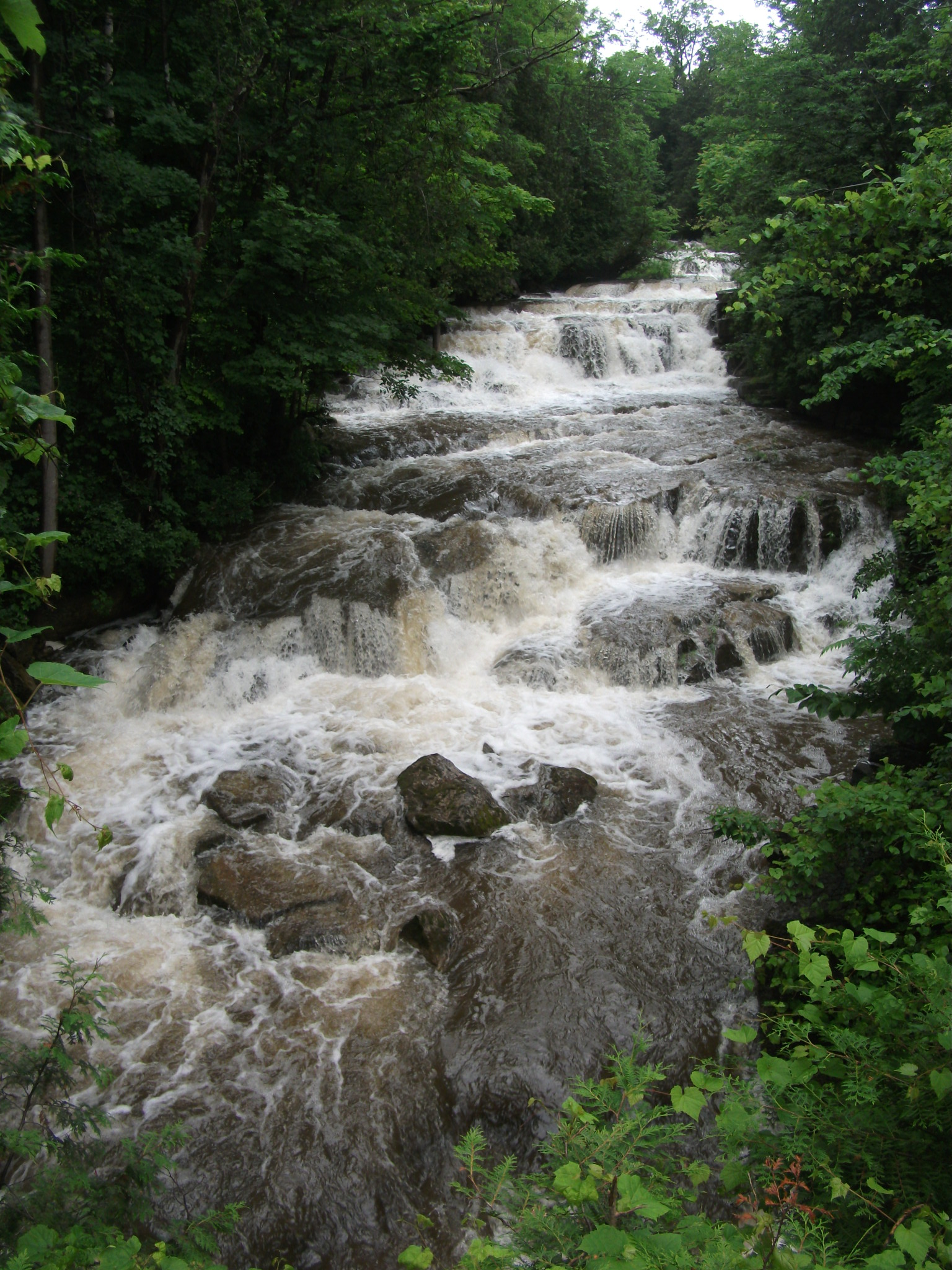
- Stockbridge Falls in July 2011

- Location within New York
- Coordinates: 42°57′04″N 75°36′28″W
- Elevation: 938 ft (286 m)
- Watercourse: Oneida Creek

Stockbridge Falls is a waterfall located on Oneida Creek southwest of Munnsville, New York.

== Description ==
Stockbridge Falls is a series of waterfalls in Madison County, near Stockbridge, New York, that extend roughly 1 mile (1.6 km). Over that span, Oneida Creek falls around 300 feet (91 m).

Most of the land surrounding the waterfall is privately owned, but it can be viewed from a local road.

== History ==
In the 20th century, the waterfall was a popular site to visit. The Syracuse Herald-Journal reported in 1906 that it was "one of the most beautiful spots in Madison County" and popular among photographers. By the 1930s, there was "considerable" construction around the falls, as individuals constructed homes and camps.
