= Andrew Watson Armour III =

- Born: October 22, 1908; Chicago, Illinois, U.S.
- Died: December 27, 1991 (aged 83); Lake Forest, Illinois, U.S.
- Education: Princeton University (1933)
- Parent: Andrew Watson Armour II

Andrew Watson "Butch" Armour III (October 22, 1908 – December 27, 1991) was a member of the prominent Armour family of meatpacking fame (Armour and Company), a company president, and notable philanthropist who, together with his wife Sarah Wood Armour, gave millions of dollars to Princeton University, St. Mark's School, Chicago's Field Museum of Natural History, and other charitable causes.

== Biography ==
'Butch' Armour was born in 1908 in Chicago, Illinois into vast wealth, later moving to Lake Forest, Illinois, where most of the Armour heirs lived. He attended St. Mark's School, then went to Princeton University, dropping out in his junior year. Armour worked for his family's company for a decade, then joined the Huck Manufacturing Co., eventually rising to the position of president. He also served on numerous boards.

According to Princeton University's website, Armour gave nearly six million dollars to the university, funding the Armour Centennial Fellowship, the Armour Faculty Support Fund, and The A. Watson Armour III and Sarah Wood Armour Fund for Music. He gave millions more to St. Mark's School, where the athletic cage and an endowed teaching position is named in his honor. Armour was also a major contributor for many years to Chicago's Field Museum of Natural History, where the A. Watson Armour III Spring Symposia are named in his honor.

Princeton University's A. Watson Armour III university professorship of Slavic Languages and Literature is endowed in his honor.
