= Allen Hoey =

American journalist

- Born: October 21, 1952; Kingston, New York, U.S.
- Died: June 16, 2010 (aged 57)
- Education: Syracuse University (BA, MA)
- Occupations: Poet; novelist; literary critic
- Children: 2

Allen Hoey (October 21, 1952 – June 16, 2010) was an American poet, novelist, and literary critic who received numerous honors during his lifetime, including a Pulitzer Prize nomination for his 2008 collection of poems Country Music.

== Life ==
Allen Hoey was born in Kingston, New York, and raised in the mid-Hudson River Valley. He moved to northern New York to do his undergraduate work, then relocated to Syracuse, New York to complete his graduate work at Syracuse University where he studied with Hayden Carruth. He received both a Masters (1980) and a Doctor of Arts (1984) in English (Creative Writing). In 1985 he took a teaching position at Ithaca College and moved to Ithaca, New York in 1986. In 1990 he took a teaching position at Bucks County Community College where he taught writing, literature, and Buddhism. In 1994 he received the precepts and formalized his commitment to Rinzai Zen Buddhist practice. Hoey has two sons by his first marriage, Owen (1980) and Stephen (1984). He died on June 16, 2010. He was a resident of Solebury, Pennsylvania just outside New Hope, Pennsylvania.

== Works ==
Hoey has written five full-length collections of poetry and three novels. His first collection, A Fire in the Cold House of Being, was selected by Galway Kinnell as winner of the 1985 Camden Poetry Award. This book was published in 1987 and was followed by What Persists in 1992 and two collections in 2005, Provençal Light and The Precincts of Paradise. In 2006 he published a novel, Chasing the Dragon. He received a Pennsylvania Council of the Arts literature fellowship, placing his poetry and criticism in many prominent literary journals, including The American Poetry Review, The Hudson Review, Poetry, and The Southern Review. His poem "A Thousand Prostrations" was included in Essential Zen, and another poem, "Essay on Snow," was included in The Best American Spiritual Writing of 2004. Hoey's second novel, Voices Beyond the Dead, a more politically oriented book, was released in the summer of 2007, and his fifth collection of poems, Country Music, was published in spring 2008.

Hoey's subjects include nature, his children, love, jazz, and spirituality. Regardless of the subject, his poems come from what Hoey has described as an "erotics of loss," exploring the evanescent and fleeting quality of life.

Of his first collection, A Fire in the Cold House of Being, Hayden Carruth noted: "The directness of Allen Hoey’s poems amounts at times almost to a kind of existential obduracy, the smack of a fist in the palm that means no more bravery, the job is being. Being in the world. When you put this together with Hoey’s marvelous vocabulary and his exacting rhythmic and tonal demands on our language, you get what no academic poetry can ever attain, real pertinence. Nowadays, all of us are reading for our lives, I think. These poems are what we need." Similar praise came from Robert McDowell in a review published in The Hudson Review: "Allen Hoey’s first full-length collection...contains more compassion, diversity, and skill than the fifth book or the tenth book by most older poets. Ranging from free verse to formal structures but never straying far from an anchoring pentameter or tetrameter line, Hoey’s subtle lyricism sounds most like the speech of the straightforward, wry upstate New York and New England folks he prefers to write about…. Hoey seems to know that at the core of the storyteller’s gift is the ability to subordinate one’s ego for the sake of hearing the stories of others. Not an easy thing to do, but the memorable story in poetry always begins there."

Poet David Dooley remarked about his second collection of poems, What Persists: "Allen Hoey's What Persists takes a leap beyond his own fine first book. Already in A Fire in the Cold House of Being Hoey demonstrated intelligence, skill with both meter and free verse, a sure sense of poetic shape, and a talent for natural description. Perhaps the two areas in which Hoey has grown the most are technical virtuosity and emotional depth. Not many poets can claim either attribute; fewer still can manage both, so that the technical skill serves as a tool for the exploration of emotion.... Poets who can adroitly handle the stanza form of Yeats' The Wild Swans at Coole (as in "Coole Park," the final poem in What Persists) usually please us by their finesse, not their power. What Persists offers both finesse and power. With this outstanding second book, Allen Hoey belongs on anyone's short list of the best American poets under the age of sixty."

During the 1980s, Hoey worked as publisher, editor, and printer for Tamarack Editions, a small press that specialized in fine, handset limited editions. Among the works published by Tamarack were Hayden Carruth's The Mythology of Dark and Light and Mother, as well as Kochan by Jack Gilbert.

Prior to his death, Hoey was at work on a series of detective novels featuring the character Dan Flannigan and his friend Otis Beaudrieux. Hoey cites his primary influences as writers in the hard-boiled school, particularly Raymond Chandler and James Crumley. The novels are largely set in Bucks County, Pennsylvania, with some taking place in Central and Northern New York. The first of these novels, On the Demon's Trail, was published in March, 2009.

Including Hayden Carruth and Jack Gilbert, among Hoey's other influences on his writing include Jim Harrison and Kenneth Rexroth.

== Bibliography ==
Poetry collections

- A Fire in the Cold House of Being (1987)
- What Persists (1992)
- Provençal Light & Other Poems (2005)
- The Precincts of Paradise (2005)
- Country Music (2008) (nominated for the Pulitzer Prize)
- Once Upon a Time at Blanche's (2009)

Novels

- Chasing the Dragon: A Novel about Jazz (2006)
- Voices Beyond the Dead (2007)
- On the Demon's Trail (2009)
