= Hayden Carruth =

American poet and literary critic (1921–2008)

- Born: 3 August 1921; Waterbury
- Died: 29 September 2008 (aged 87); Munnsville
- Occupations: Poet, writer
- Awards: Guggenheim Fellowship (1965); National Book Award for Poetry (1996); Shelley Memorial Award (1979); National Book Critics Circle Award for Poetry (1992); Ruth Lilly Poetry Prize (1990)

Hayden Carruth (August 3, 1921 – September 29, 2008) was an American poet, literary critic and anthologist. He taught at Syracuse University.

== Life ==
Hayden Carruth was born in Waterbury, Connecticut and grew up in Woodbury, Connecticut. He graduated from Pleasantville High School in Pleasantville, New York with the class of 1939 as vice president of the senior class; he was credited with the "prettiest hair." He received his undergraduate degree in journalism from the University of North Carolina at Chapel Hill in 1943 and an M.A. from the University of Chicago in 1948. While institutionalized in White Plains, New York from 1953 to 1954, he befriended and subsequently mentored Gordon Lish throughout his adolescence. He lived in Johnson, Vermont for many years. From 1977 to 1988, he was the poetry editor of Harper's Magazine.

After teaching at Johnson State College (poet-in-residence; 1972–1974) and the University of Vermont (adjunct professor; 1975–1978), Carruth was a tenured professor of English at Syracuse University in the graduate creative writing program beginning in 1979; in this capacity, he taught and mentored many younger poets (including Brooks Haxton and Allen Hoey) before taking emeritus status in 1991. He resided with his wife, fellow poet Joe-Anne McLaughlin Carruth, near the small central New York village of Munnsville. He wrote for over sixty years. Carruth died from complications following a series of strokes.

== Early life ==
Hayden Carruth was the son of Gorton Veeder Carruth a journalist and newspaper editor, and Margery Carruth. His interest in poetry started early due to his father.

== Works ==
Carruth wrote more than 30 books of poetry, four books of literary criticism, essays, a novel and two poetry anthologies. Prior to his affiliation with Harper's, he served as editor-in-chief of Poetry (1949–1950) and as advisory editor of The Hudson Review for twenty years. He was awarded a Guggenheim and the NEA fellowships.

In 1992 he was awarded the National Book Critics Circle Award for his Collected Shorter Poems and in 1996 the National Book Award in poetry for his Scrambled Eggs and Whiskey. Shortly after the debut of Scrambled Eggs and Whiskey, he also won the $50,000 Lannan Literary Award. His later titles include the 2001 collection of poems Doctor Jazz and a 70-minute audio CD of him reading selections from Scrambled Eggs and Whiskey and Collected Shorter Poems. His Last Poems (Copper Canyon Press, 2012) combines poems written toward the end of his life with the concluding poems from twenty-six of his previous volumes. Other awards with which he was honored included the Carl Sandburg Award, the Lenore Marshall Poetry Prize, the Paterson Poetry Prize, the 1990 Ruth Lilly Poetry Prize, the Vermont Governor's Medal and the Whiting Award.

Noted for the breadth of his linguistic and formal resources, influenced by jazz and the blues, Carruth's poems are informed by his political radicalism and sense of cultural responsibility. Among his influences, Carruth particularly admired 18th century poet Alexander Pope, lauding "Pope's rationalism and pandeism with which he wrote the greatest mock-epic in English literature"

Many of Carruth's best-known poems are about the people and places of northern Vermont, as well as rural poverty and hardship, addressing loneliness, insanity, and death. One of his most celebrated poems is "Emergency Haying".

== Published works ==
- The Crow and the Heart (NY: The Macmillan Company, The Macmillan Poets, Paperback, 1959).
- The Norfolk Poems (Iowa City, IA: Prairie Press, 1962)
- Appendix A (1963): a novel about adultery.
- Nothing for Tigers: Poems 1959–1964 (NY: The Macmillan Company, 1965)
- The Clay Hill Anthology (Iowa City, IA: Prairie Press, 1970)
- For You—Poems (NY: New Directions Publishing Corporation, 1970)
- From Snow and Rock, from Chaos (NY: New Directions Publishing Corporation, 1973)
- Dark World (Santa Cruz, Calif: Kayak, 1974)
- The Bloomingdale Papers (Athens, GA: The University of Georgia Press, Contemporary Poetry Series, Paperback, 1974), Illustrations by Albert Christ-Janer
- Brothers, I Loved You All: Poems 1969–1977 (Riverdale-on-Hudson, NY: The Sheep Meadow Press, 1978)
- The Sleeping Beauty (1982)
- Working Papers: Selected Essays and Reviews (Athens, GA: The University of Georgia Press, 1982), Edited by Judith Weissman
- If You Call This Cry a Song (Woodstock, VT: Countryman Press, 1983)
- Effluences from the Sacred Caves: More Selected Essays and Reviews (Ann Arbor, MI: University of Michigan Press, 1983)
- The Selected Poetry of Hayden Carruth (NY: Macmillan/Simon & Schuster, 1985), Foreword by Galway Kinnell
- Asphalt Georgics (NY: New Directions Publishing Corporation, 1985)
- The Oldest Killed Lake in North America: Poems 1979–1981 (Grenada, MS: Salt-Works Press, Paperback, July 1985)
- Lighter Than Air Craft (Lewisburg, PA: Bucknell University/The Press of Appletree Alley, 1985)
- Sitting In: Selected Writings on Jazz, Blues, & Related Topics (Iowa City, IA: University of Iowa Press, Hardcover, 1986)
- Sonnets (Lewisburg, PA: The Press of Appletree Alley, 1989), Illustrated by Barnard Taylor
- Tell Me Again How the White Heron Rises and Flies Across the Nacreous River at Twilight Toward the Distant Islands (NY: New Directions Publishing Corporation, October 1989)
- The Sleeping Beauty (Port Townsend, WA: Copper Canyon Press, 1990)
- Collected Shorter Poems: 1946–1991 (Port Townsend, WA: Copper Canyon Press, 1992)
- Suicides and Jazzers (Ann Arbor, MI: University of Michigan Press, Poets on Poetry Series, 1992)
- Collected Longer Poems (Port Townsend, WA: Copper Canyon Press, 1994)
- Selected Essays & Reviews (Port Townsend, WA: Copper Canyon Press, 1996)
- Scrambled Eggs & Whiskey: Poems, 1991–1995 (Port Townsend, WA: Copper Canyon Press, 1996) —winner of the National Book Award for Poetry
- Reluctantly: Autobiographical Essays (1998)
- Beside the Shadblow Tree: A Memoir of James Laughlin (Port Townsend, WA: Copper Canyon Press, 1999)
- Hayden Carruth: A Listener's Guide (audio CD) 2000
- Doctor Jazz (Port Townsend, WA: Copper Canyon Press, 2001)
- Letters to Jane (Port Townsend, WA: Copper Canyon Press, 2004)
- Toward the Distant Islands: New and Selected Poems (Port Townsend, WA: Copper Canyon Press, 2006)
- A Vision of Now (The Sewanee Review), 2009) — published posthumously
- Last Poems (Port Townsend, WA: Copper Canyon Press, 2012)

Editor

- The Voice That Is Great within Us (1970): an influential anthology of American poetry.
