= Philip Danforth Armour =

American meatpacking industrialist (1832 – 1901)

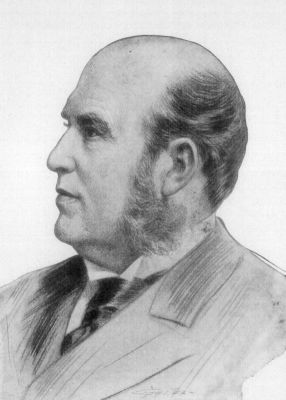
- Born: May 16, 1832; Stockbridge, New York, U.S.
- Died: January 6, 1901 (aged 68); Chicago, Illinois, U.S.
- Burial place: Graceland Cemetery
- Spouse: Malvina Bell Ogden
- Children: J. Ogden Armour (1863–1927); Philip Danforth Armour Jr. (1869–1900)
- Relatives: Herman Ossian Armour (brother); Alice de Janzé (great niece)

Philip Danforth Armour Sr. (May 16, 1832 – January 6, 1901) was an American meatpacking industrialist who founded the Chicago-based firm of Armour and Company. Born on a farm in upstate New York, he initially gained financial success when he made $8,000 during the California gold rush from 1852 to 1856 (equivalent to $287,000 in 2025). He later opened a wholesale soap business in Cincinnati, then moved it to Milwaukee.

During the American Civil War, Armour capitalized on the opportunity to sell meat to the Union army, making millions in the process. In 1875, he moved his base to Chicago. His innovations included bringing live hogs to the metropolis for slaughter, inventing an assembly line system for the disassembly of hogs, canning the product, economy of scale and efficiency in detail. He systematically utilized waste products, boasting that he made use of "everything but the squeal". The introduction of refrigerated rail cars opened a national market for him and competitors such as Gustavus Swift. Armour expanded into banking and speculation on the futures market for pork and wheat by 1900, his plants employed 15,000 workers; his own wealth was in the range of $50 million (~$1.55 billion in 2024). The urgent Army need for meat during the Spanish–American War of 1898 led to highly publicized complaints about "embalmed beef." Armour retired from business in 1899 and devoted himself to philanthropy in the Chicago area, including low-cost housing for industrial workers and the major institution of higher education, the Armour Institute of Technology (now part of Illinois Institute of Technology).

== Life and career ==
Armour was born in Stockbridge, New York, to Danforth Armour and Juliana Ann Brooks. He was one of eight children and grew up on his family's farm. Armour was descended from colonial settlers of Scottish and English origin, with his surname originating in Scotland. He was educated at Cazenovia Academy in New York until the school expelled him for taking a ride in a buggy. Among his first jobs was that of driver on upstate New York's Chenango Canal which ran through Madison County at that time and would have been a busy thoroughfare. At age 19, Armour left New York with about 30 other people for California, joining the California gold rush. They walked most of the way from New York to California. Before the journey, Armour "had received several hundred dollars from his parents," making him, for the most part, "the financier of the party," according to biographer Edward N. Wentworth. In California, Armour started a business employing out-of-work miners to construct sluices, which controlled the waters that flowed through the mined rivers. In only a few years, Armour had turned his business into a profitable enterprise, earning himself about $8,000 by the time he had turned 24.

With his sizable fortune in hand, Armour then moved to Milwaukee, Wisconsin, starting a wholesale grocery business. Armour formed business partnerships with Frederick Miles in the grain business in 1859. He worked with Miles for three years before he partnered with John Plankinton in the meatpacking industry, creating the company Plankinton, Armour & Company. Armour helped Plankinton start up "a new plant on the Menominee River so that the firm could handle government pork contracts." They experienced prompt success through the distribution of meats, produce, and grains to westward-moving settlers and fortune-seekers. It was also during this period when Armour married Malvina Belle Ogden in 1862. Armour demonstrated his uncanny ability as a young businessman by taking advantage of changing meat prices during and after the Civil War. According to biographer Deborah S. Ing, "the most important business coup of Armour's early career occurred near the end of the Civil War when he predicted heavy Confederate losses and thus the dropping of pork prices…he made contracts with buyers at $40 per barrel before prices plummeted to $18 when the war ended in a Union victory. This deal netted him a profit of $22 per barrel or a total of $1 million to $2 million." Armour's savvy decision elevated the status of Plankinton, Armour & Co., allowing the firm to expand into other cities.

Later with his brother, Herman, he again entered the grain business and built several meat packing plants in the Menomonee Valley. After individually prospering in three different regions, Philip, Herman and Joseph reconvened in 1867 to form the flagship Armour & Company in Chicago, which packed hogs exclusively for the first eight years of its existence. The company became the world's largest food processing and chemical manufacturing enterprise. It was the first company to produce canned meat and one of the first to employ an assembly line in its factories.

In the winter of 1879–1880, Armour traveled to Wyandotte County, Kansas, after becoming disturbed to hear that emancipated blacks from the deep South had arrived there unprepared for the midwestern winter. Armour returned to Chicago and raised funds for the stranded Exodusters, reporting, "I talked with a great many of them and was surprised at their intelligence. I asked them where they thought they were going. They said only North to escape persecution. . . . They had no idea that they were going to a land of plenty or idleness, but simply to a land of freedom." In all, Armour raised $1,200 from Chicago businesses ($200 from Armour and Company, $200 from the unrelated Armour, Dole & Co., $200 from Field, Leiter & Co., $100 from N.K. Fairbank & Co., and $50 each from ten others).

In order to get his meat products to market Armour followed the lead of rival Gustavus Swift when he established the Armour Refrigerator Line in 1883. Armour's endeavor became the largest private refrigerator car fleet in the U.S., which by 1900 listed over 12,000 units on its roster, all built in Armour's car plant. The General American Transportation Corporation would assume ownership of the line in 1932.

In the late 1880s, he was solicited by Peter Demens to invest in his Orange Belt Railway running across central Florida, and one of the depots was named in his honor. In 1900, while terminally ill he wintered in Southern California, probably due to his association with Demens, and his son Philip Jr. came to visit, caught pneumonia and suddenly died on January 29. The next winter Armour was too ill to travel to California, and he died in Chicago.

His meatpacking plants pioneered new principles of large-scale organization and refrigeration to the industry. Armour implemented the assembly line in order to speed up production, and he was one of the first to reduce the tremendous waste when slaughtering of hogs by refining and selling waste products. His biggest concern was ensuring that every part of the animal was made useful, "thus, out of meatpacking came auxiliary industries such as glue, fertilizer, margarine, lard, [and] gelatin." Armour famously declared that he made use of "everything but the squeal". By developing these profitable manufacturing innovations and expanding the reach of his company, Armour & Co. became one of the largest meatpacking firms in America by the 1890s. It earned an estimated $110 million in 1893 and established Armour's position as one of the great industrialists of the Gilded Age.

== Labor issues ==
Since the end of the Civil War, labor activists in Chicago had been fighting for powerful labor unions that would negotiate the eight-hour day and higher wages. At a time when the living wage for a five-member family was $15.40 per week, the workers at Armour & Company only earned about $9.50 per week. After Armour's butchers had publicly called for better pay and improved job security in the early 1880s, Armour kicked out the union workers and blacklisted the leaders of the strike. In the weeks before the Haymarket bombing of May 4, 1886, Armour had even encouraged his colleagues to equip a militia to suppress future labor actions. In the book Death in the Haymarket, historian James Green notes that the supplies included "a good machine gun, to be used by them in case of trouble". Over the course of his career, Armour had broken three major strikes that had directly concerned his factories, blacklisting all of the union leaders involved. The New York Times emphasized in its reporting how greatly Armour "cares for his labor" without any sense of irony. "Although his workers lived and worked in squalid conditions," the PBS series American Experience reports, "Armour was known as a philanthropist".

== Embalmed beef scandal ==
The company's reputation was tarnished further in 1898, when Major General Nelson A. Miles, Commanding General of the United States Army, claimed that the major meatpacking companies of Chicago—including Armour's—were sending chemically-treated meat to soldiers fighting in the Spanish–American War. An investigation followed, but no definite verdict was reached. Skeptics would claim that Armour simply bribed the panel while Armour would defend his innocence for the rest of his life. Even so, the damage was done. The evidence that was found provided fodder for the muckraking novel by Upton Sinclair entitled The Jungle, which was published in February 1906 and became a bestseller. Armour's reputation never recovered from the 1898–1899 scandal.

== Death and legacy ==
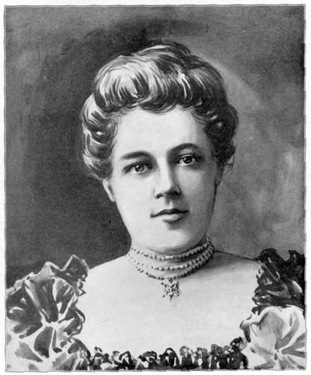
Malvina Belle Ogden, Armour's wife

Armour died at age 69 on January 6, 1901, of pneumonia at his Chicago home. He was survived by his wife, Malvina Belle Ogden whom he had married in 1862, and by his son J. Ogden Armour. His family call him "P. D."

In 1893, Armour donated $1 million to found the Armour Institute of Technology (a privately endowed coeducational college), which merged with the Lewis Institute to become Illinois Institute of Technology (IIT) in 1940.

Armour Square Park and the surrounding neighborhood of Armour Square on Chicago's South Side are named in honor of him. The Armour brothers Joseph and Philip founded the Armour Mission, an educational and healthcare center. Armour, South Dakota, was named for him in 1885, and Armourdale, Kansas, (now the district of Armourdale in Kansas City, Kansas) in 1881. To acknowledge his investment in the Orange Belt Railroad, in 1889 a depot was named "Armour" near St. Petersburg, Florida. Streets in Cudahy, Wisconsin, (a Milwaukee suburb founded by meat packing magnate Patrick Cudahy) as well as Oconomowoc, Wisconsin, where the Armour family had a summer estate, also bear his name. Philip D. Armour Elementary School in South Chicago, and streets of north Redondo Beach, California, are named after prominent American businessmen of the industrial revolution. Armour Lane is one of them. The Union Pacific Railroad uses Armour Yellow as one of its official colors, the same hue used by Armour refrigerated cars in the early 20th century.

== See also ==
- Hormel
- Andrew Watson Armour III

== Footnotes ==
Preceded by Creator	President of Armour and Company; 1867–1901	Succeeded by J. Ogden Armour
