= Armour Square Park =

Park in Chicago, Illinois, United States

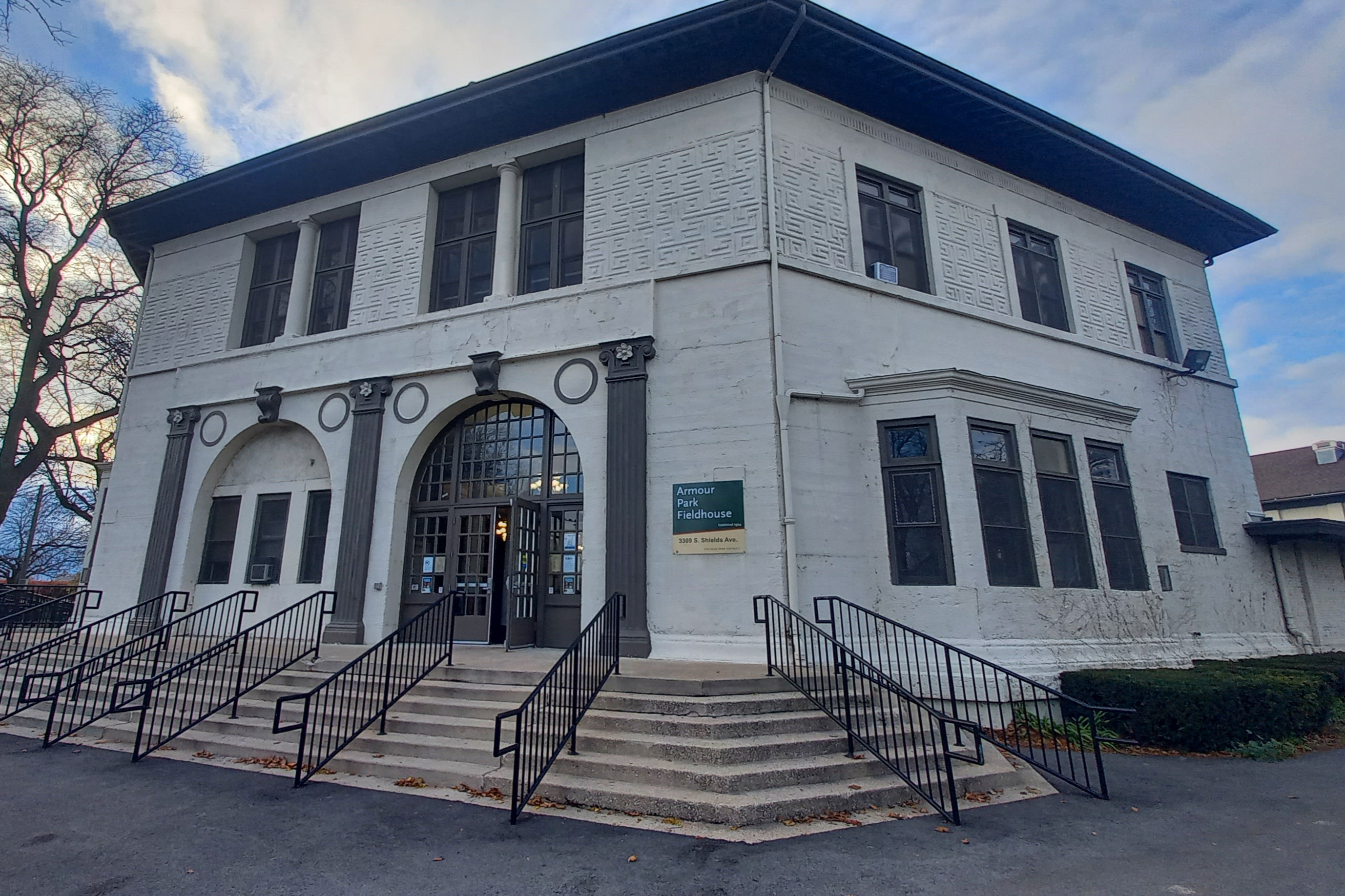
- Armour Square Park fieldhouse
- Interactive map of Armour Square Park
- Type: Urban park
- Location: Bounded by 33rd Street, 34th Street, Wells Street, and Shields Avenue, Chicago, Illinois
- Coordinates: 41°50′1″N 87°38′2″W
- Opened: March 1905; 121 years ago
- Designer: D.H. Burnham & Company; Olmsted Brothers
- Etymology: Philip Danforth Armour
- Armour Square
- U.S. National Register of Historic Places
- U.S. Historic district
- Architectural style: Beaux Arts
- MPS: Chicago Park District MPS
- NRHP reference No.: 03000789
- Added to NRHP: August 19, 2003

Armour (Philip) Square Park, also known as Armour Square or Park No. 3, is a park in Chicago, Illinois featuring Beaux Arts architecture, designed by D.H. Burnham and the Olmsted Brothers. The park was opened in March 1905, at a cost of $220,000. It was named after Philip Danforth Armour, philanthropist and captain of industry.
