= Armour Refrigerator Line =

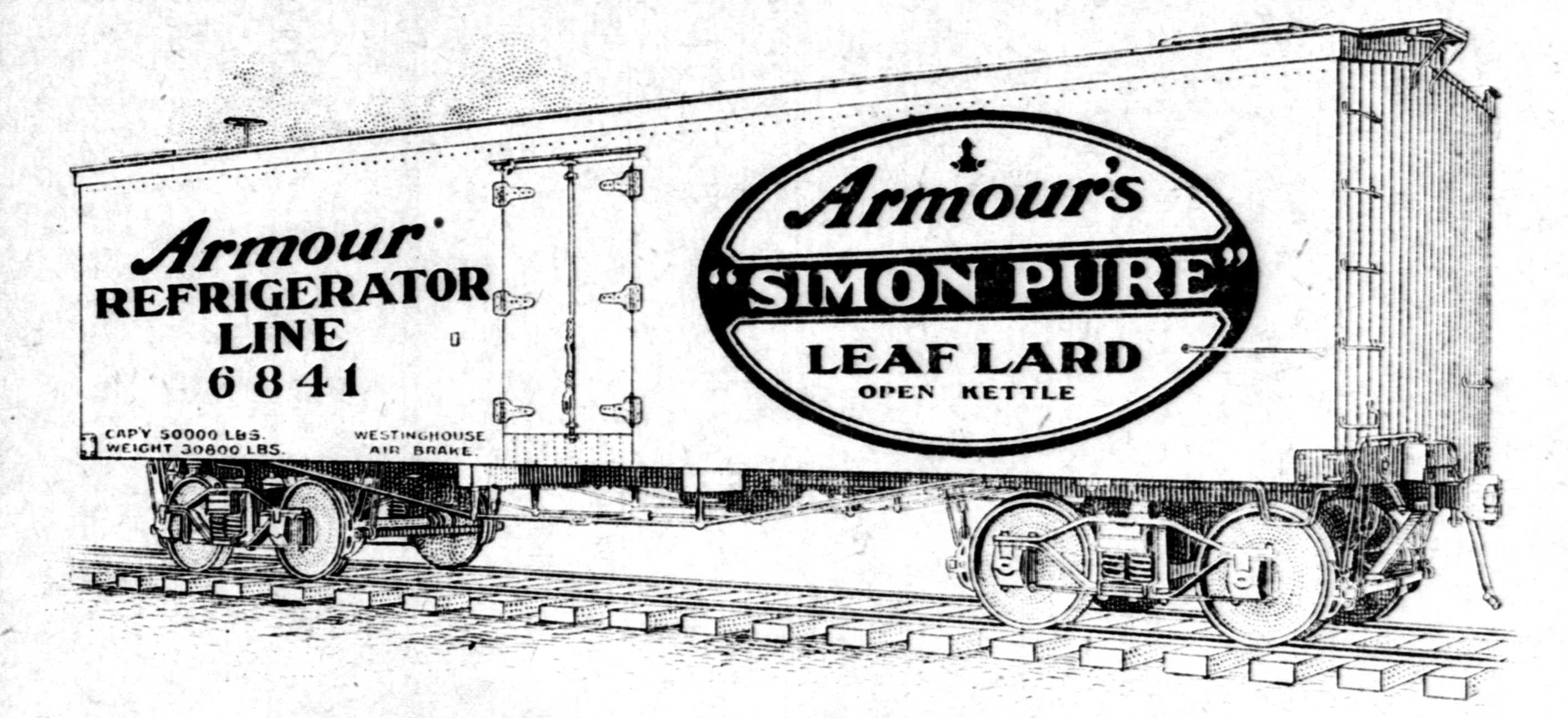
Car of the Line, shown circa 1911

The Armour Refrigerator Line (ARL, one of the Armour Car Lines) was a private refrigerator car line established in 1883 by Chicago meat packer Philip Armour, the founder of Armour and Company.

To get his products to market, Armour followed the lead of rivals George Hammond and Gustavus Swift when he established the Armour Refrigerator Line in 1883. Armour's endeavor soon became the largest private refrigerator car fleet in America. By 1900, the company listed over 12,000 units on its roster (one-third of all the privately owned cars in the country), all built in Armour's own car plant.

One of the Armour Car Lines' subsidiaries was dedicated to produce hauling. In 1919 the Federal Trade Commission ordered the company's sale for antitrust reasons. On March 18 of the following year the new entity, to be known as Fruit Growers Express (FGE), would take with it 4,280 pieces of rolling stock, repairs shops at Alexandria, Virginia and Jacksonville, Florida, and numerous ice plants and other facilities scattered throughout the East Coast.

Armour Car Lines Roster, 1900–1960
Year	1900	1910	1920	1930	1940	1950	1960
Fleet size	12,000	—	5,088	5,681	5,412	4,198	1,974
