= Oneida Creek =

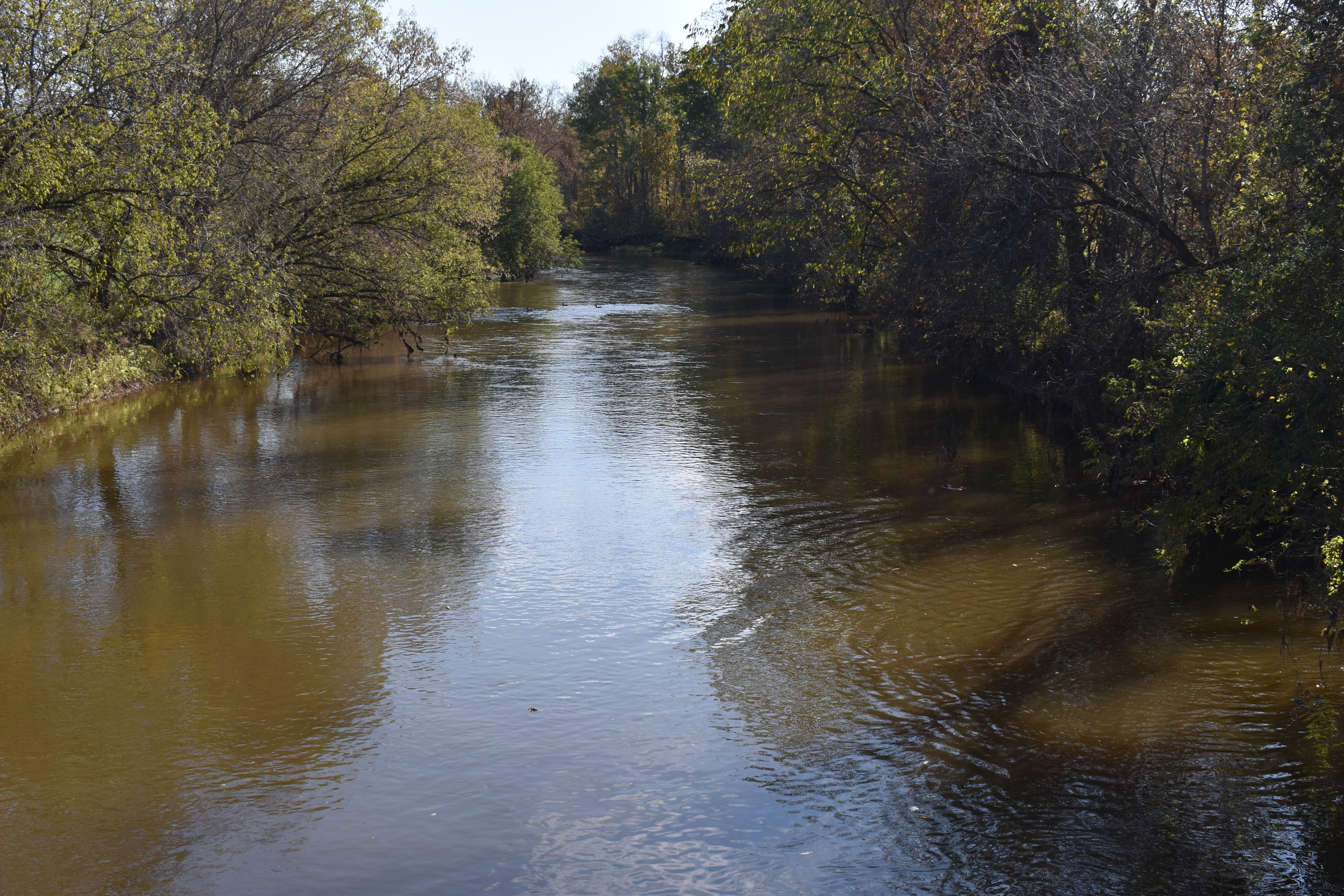
- Oneida Creek upstream of Swallow Bridge Road

- Location of the mouth of Oneida Creek in New York State Oneida Creek (the United States)

Location
- Country: United States
- State: New York
- Counties: Madison, Oneida
- Cities: Oneida, Sherrill

Physical characteristics
- Source
  - location: Town of Smithfield, Madison County
  - coordinates: 42°59′01″N 75°40′46″W
- Mouth: Oneida Lake
  - location: South Bay, Town of Lenox, Madison/Oneida county border
  - coordinates: 43°09′52″N 75°44′17″W
- Discharge
  - location: Oneida
  - average: 175 cu ft/s (5.0 m^{3}/s)
  - minimum: 9.5 cu ft/s (0.27 m^{3}/s) (September 6, 1999)
  - maximum: 11,400 cu ft/s (320 m^{3}/s) (June 28, 2013)

Basin features
- Waterfalls: Stockbridge Falls

Oneida Creek is a small river in New York in the United States. The creek enters the southeastern corner of Oneida Lake at a location known as South Bay, a bay of the lake. The name is derived from the Oneida tribe of the Iroquois. Stockbridge Falls is located on Oneida Creek.

== Course ==
Oneida Creek rises in the Town of Smithfield. The cities of Oneida and Sherrill are located along the lower part of the creek. The creek forms part of the boundary between Madison and Oneida counties before entering Oneida Lake near the community of South Bay in the Town of Lenox, located just south of the mouth of the creek. Verona Beach State Park is located north of the mouth.

== Hydrology ==
The flow of the creek near the City of Oneida averages about 175 cu ft/s (5.0 m^{3}/s).

== History ==
The region of the river is known for the historic Oneida Community of the 19th century. In the past the Erie Canal was closely associated with the creek prior to the canal being moved farther north.

== See also ==
- List of rivers in New York
