= Armour and Company =

Former American company

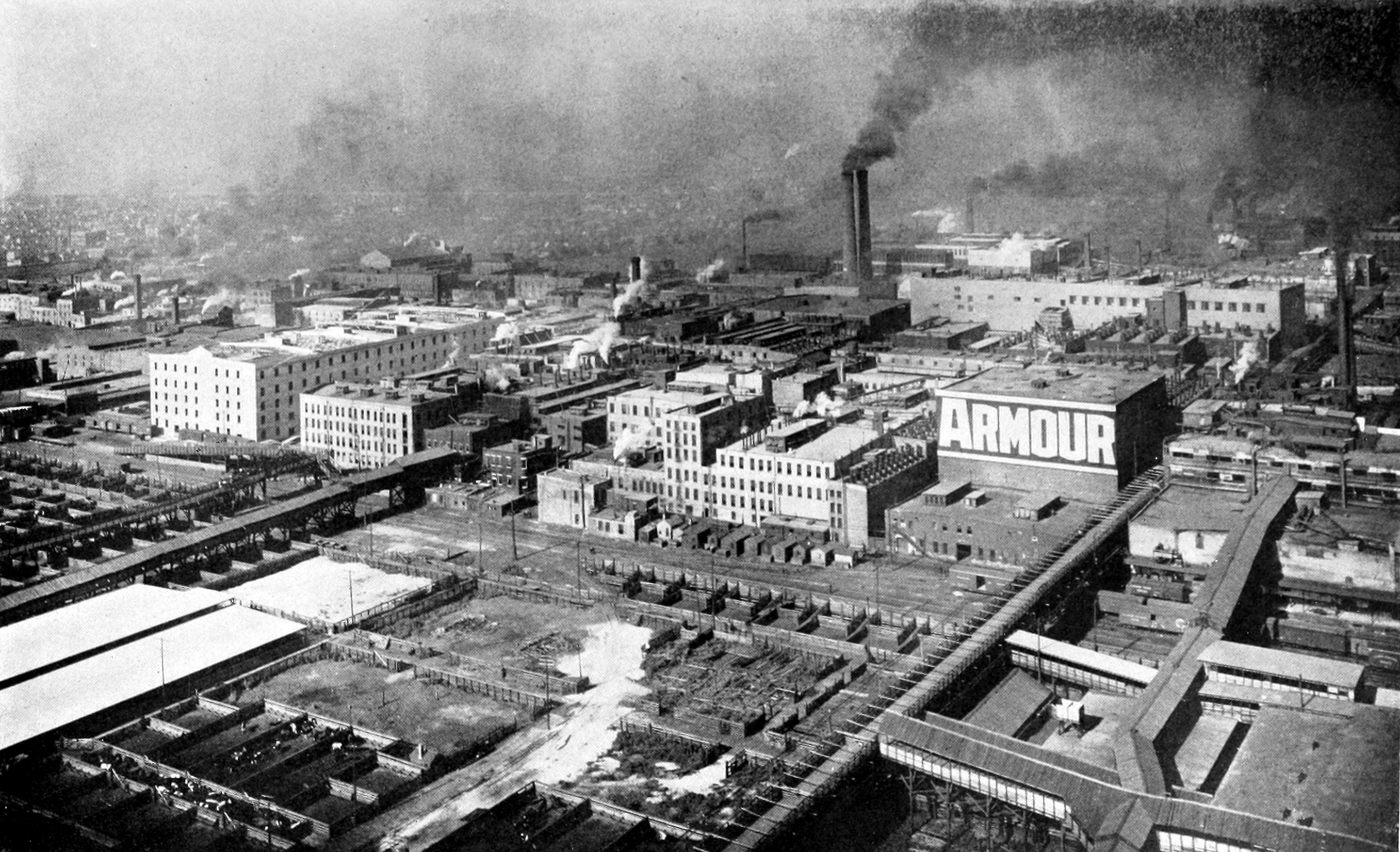
- View of Armour & Company's plant and stock yards from a balloon, c. 1910
- Industry: Meatpacking, consumer products, pharmaceuticals
- Founded: 1867; 159 years ago in Chicago
- Founder: Philip Danforth Armour
- Defunct: 1983
- Fate: Sold to ConAgra
- Headquarters: Chicago, Illinois, United States
- Area served: United States
- Products: Processed meat, canned food, soap, pharmaceuticals
- Owner: Philip Danforth Armour family (1863–1920); Frederick H. Prince (1920–1969); The Greyhound Corporation (1970–1983)

Armour (brand)
- Product type: Processed meat
- Current owner: Smithfield Foods
- Country: United States
- Markets: United States
- Previous owners: Armour and Company (1863–1983), ConAgra (1983–2006)
- Website: armourmeats.com

Armour Star (brand)
- Product type: Canned food
- Current owner: Pinnacle Foods
- Country: United States
- Markets: United States
- Previous owners: Armour and Company (1944–1983), The Dial Corporation (1983–2006)
- Tagline: Any Time is Armour Time
- Website: armour-star.com

Armour & Company was an American company and was one of the five leading firms in the meat packing industry. It was founded in Chicago, in 1863, by the Armour brothers led by Philip Danforth Armour. By 1880, the company had become Chicago's most important business and had helped make Chicago and its Union Stock Yards the center of America's meatpacking industry. During the same period, its facility in Omaha, Nebraska, boomed, making the city's meatpacking industry the largest in the nation by 1959. In connection with its meatpacking operations, the company also ventured into pharmaceuticals (Armour Pharmaceuticals) and soap manufacturing, introducing Dial soap in 1948.

Presently, the Armour food brands are split between Smithfield Foods (for refrigerated meat, Armour Meats) and ConAgra Brands (for canned shelf-stable meat products, Armour Star). The Armour pharmaceutical brand is owned by Forest Laboratories. Dial soap is now owned by Henkel.

== History ==
=== 1863–1970 ===
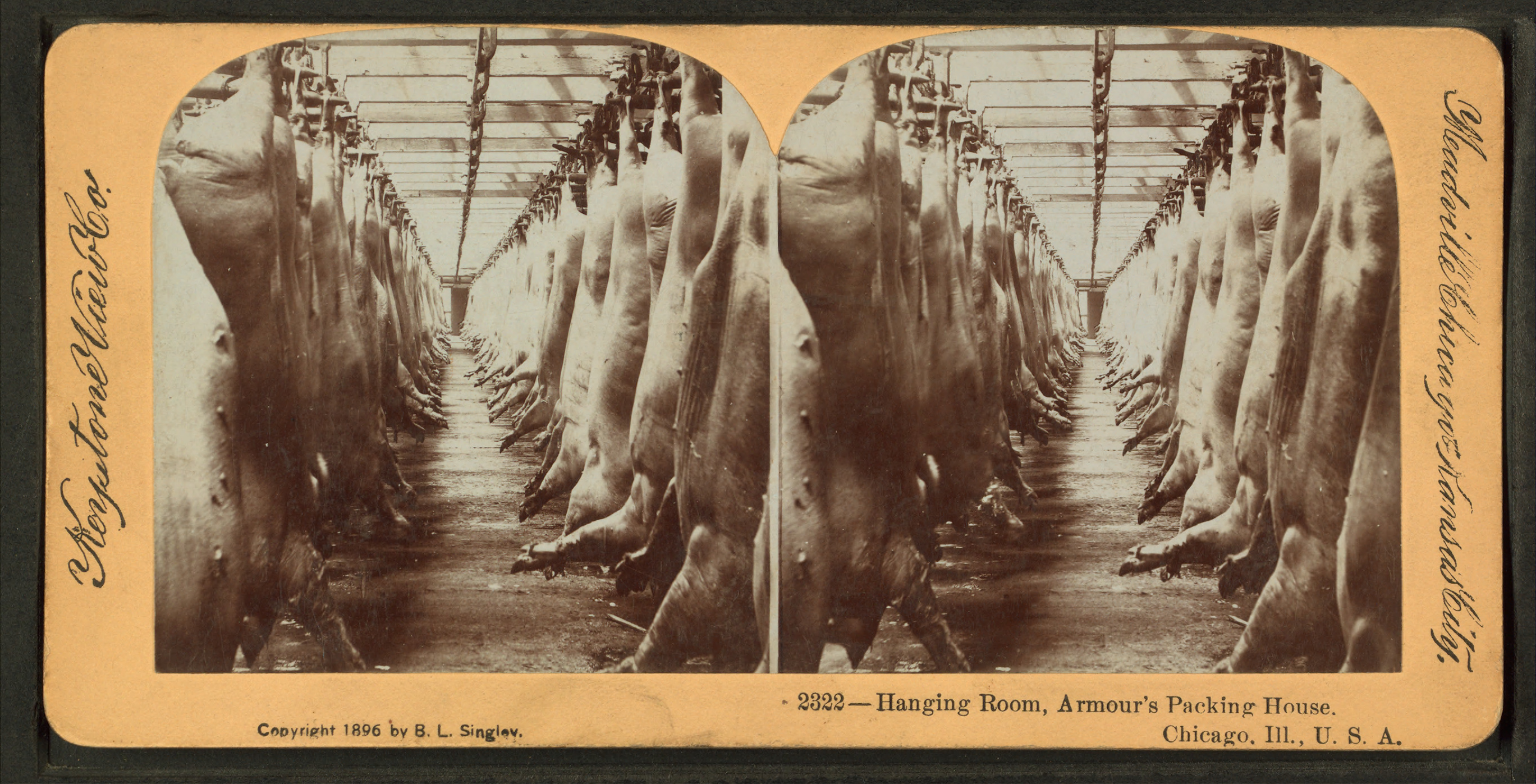
Hanging room, Armour's packing house, Chicago, 1896

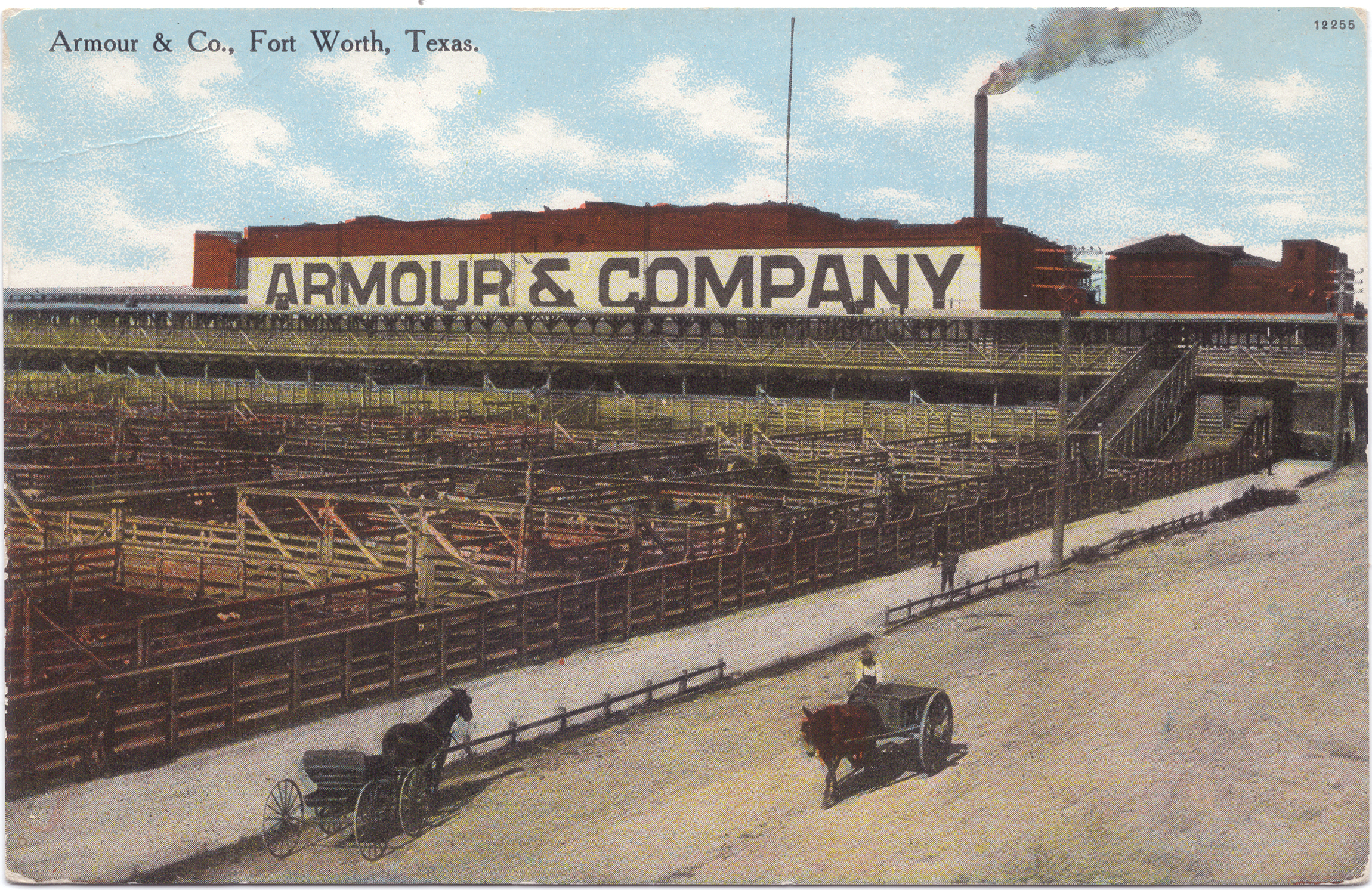
Postcard of the Armour Packing Plant in Fort Worth, undated

Armour and Company had its roots in Milwaukee, where in 1863 Philip D. Armour joined with John Plankinton (the founder of the Layton and Plankinton Packing Company in 1852) to establish Plankinton, Armour and Company. Together, the partners expanded Plankinton's Milwaukee meat packing operation and established branches in Chicago and Kansas City and an exporting house in New York City. Armour and Plankinton dissolved their partnership in 1884 with the Milwaukee operation eventually becoming the Cudahy Packing Company.

In addition to meats, Armour sold many types of consumer products made from animals in its early years, including glue, oil, fertilizer, hairbrushes, buttons, oleomargarine, and drugs, made from slaughterhouse byproducts. Armour operated in an environment without labor unions, health inspections, or government regulation. Accidents were commonplace. Armour was notorious for the low pay it offered its line workers. It fought unionization by banning known union activists and breaking strikes in 1904 and 1921 by employing African Americans and new immigrants as strikebreakers. The company did not become fully unionized until the late 1930s when the meatpacking union succeeded in creating an interracial industrial union as part of the Congress of Industrial Organizations.

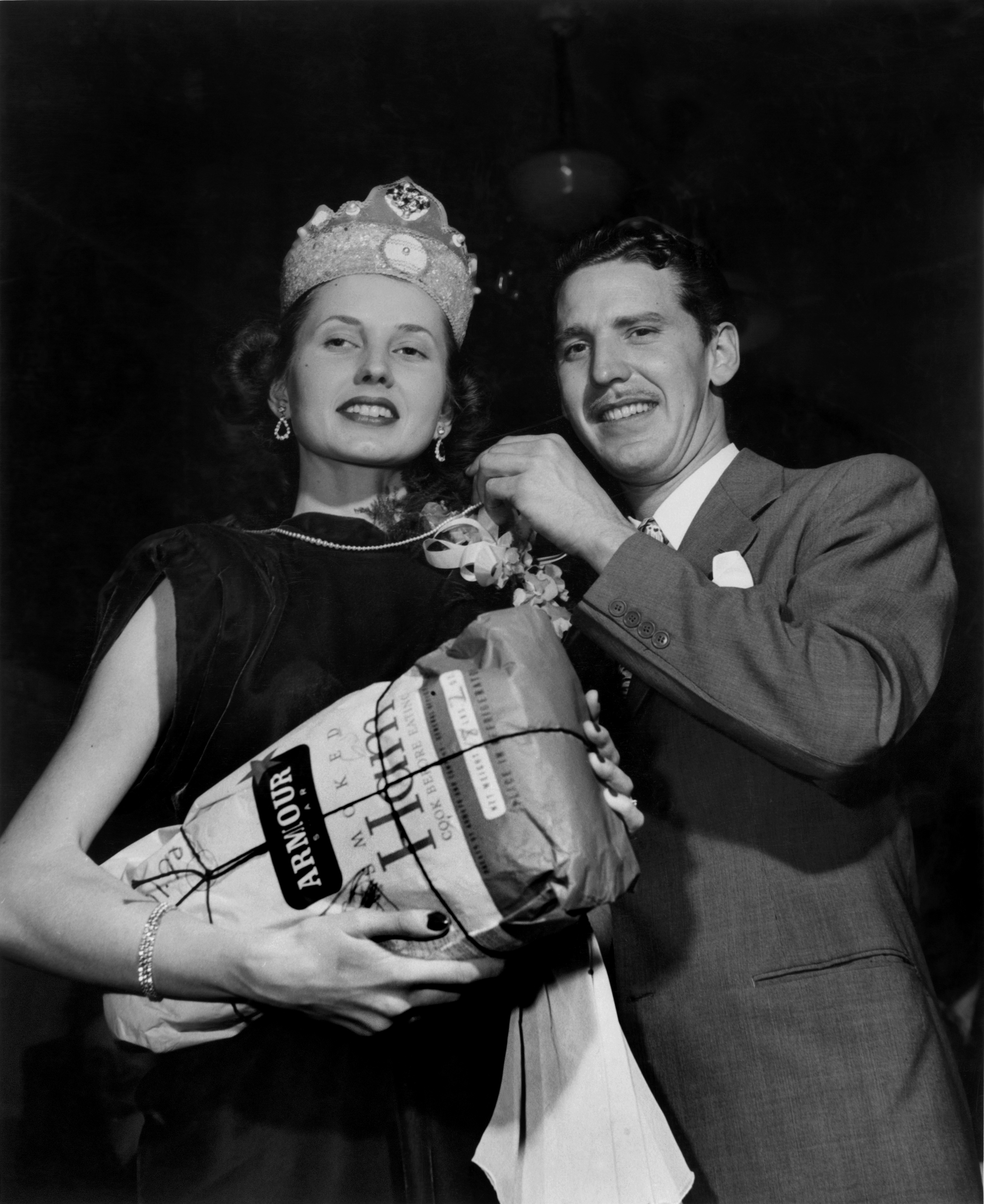
Miss Oak Ridge Tennessee 1947 wins an Armour smoked ham

During the Spanish–American War (1898), Armour sold 500,000 pounds (230,000 kg) of beef to the US Army. An army inspector tested the meat two months later and found that 751 cases were rotten and had contributed to the food poisoning of thousands of soldiers.

In the first decade of the 20th century, a young Dale Carnegie, representing the South Omaha sales region, became the company's highest-selling salesman, an experience he drew on in his best-selling book, How to Win Friends and Influence People.

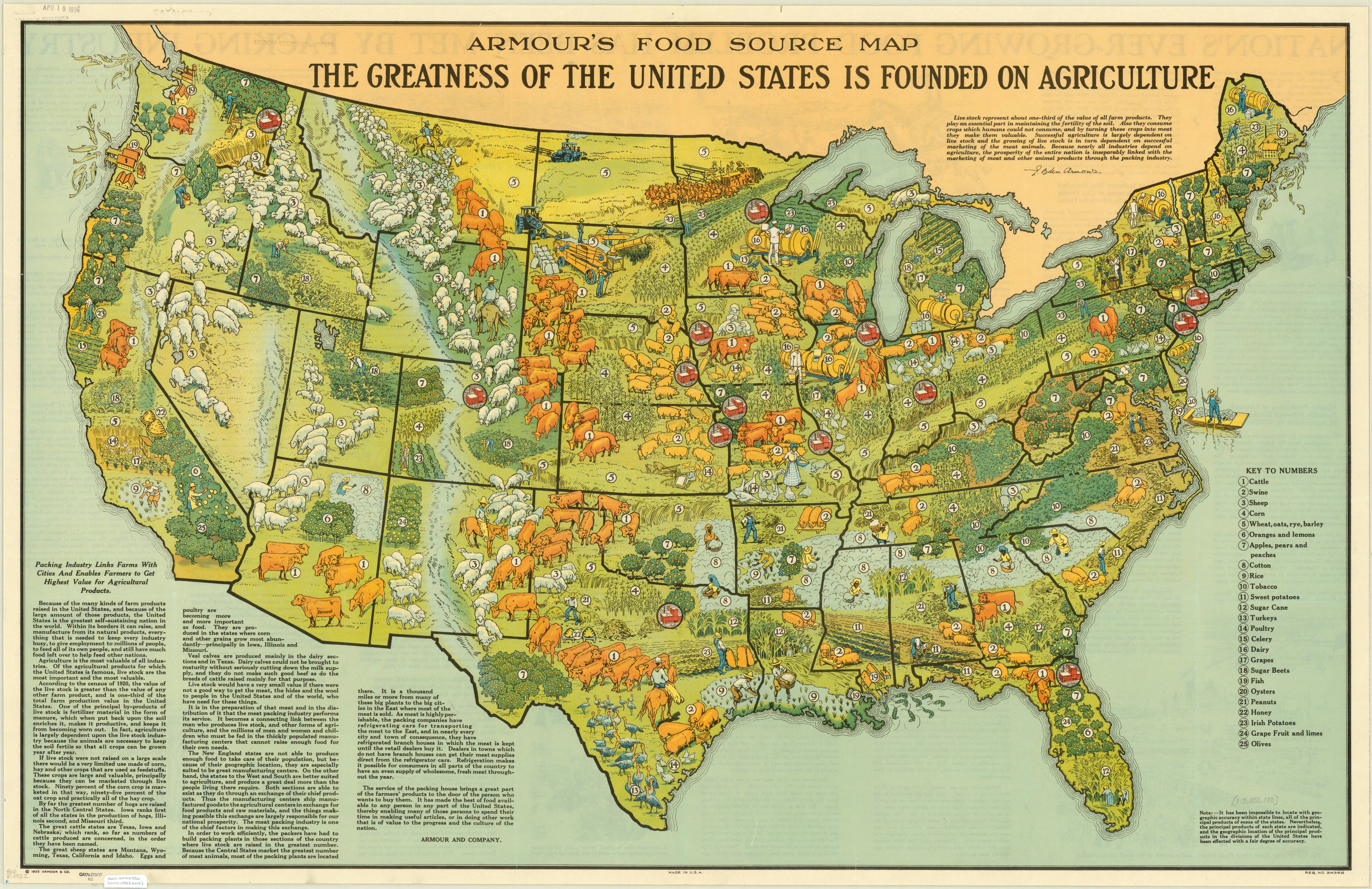
Armour's Food Source Map : The Greatness of the United States Is Founded on Agriculture, 1922

In the early 1920s, Armour encountered financial troubles and the family sold its majority interest to financier Frederick H. Prince. The firm retained its position as one of the largest American firms through the Great Depression and the sharp increase in demand during World War II. During this period, it expanded its operations across the United States; at its peak, the company employed just under 50,000 people.

In 1948, Armour, which had made soap for years as a byproduct of the meatpacking process, developed a deodorant soap by adding the germicidal agent AT-7 to soap. This limited body odor by reducing bacteria on the skin. The new soap was named Dial because of its 24-hour protection against the odor-causing bacteria. Armour introduced the soap with a full-page advertisement using scented ink in the Chicago Tribune. During the 1950s, Dial became the best-selling deodorant soap in the US. The company adopted the slogan "Aren't you glad you use Dial? Don't you wish everybody did?" in 1953. In the 1960s, the Dial brand was expanded to include deodorants and shaving creams. Because of the popularity and strong sales of Dial brand, fueled by magazine, radio, and television advertising, Armour's consumer-products business was incorporated as Armour-Dial, Inc. in 1967.

In 1958, William Wood-Prince, a cousin of Frederick H. Prince, became president of Armour and Company.

=== 1970–1985 ===
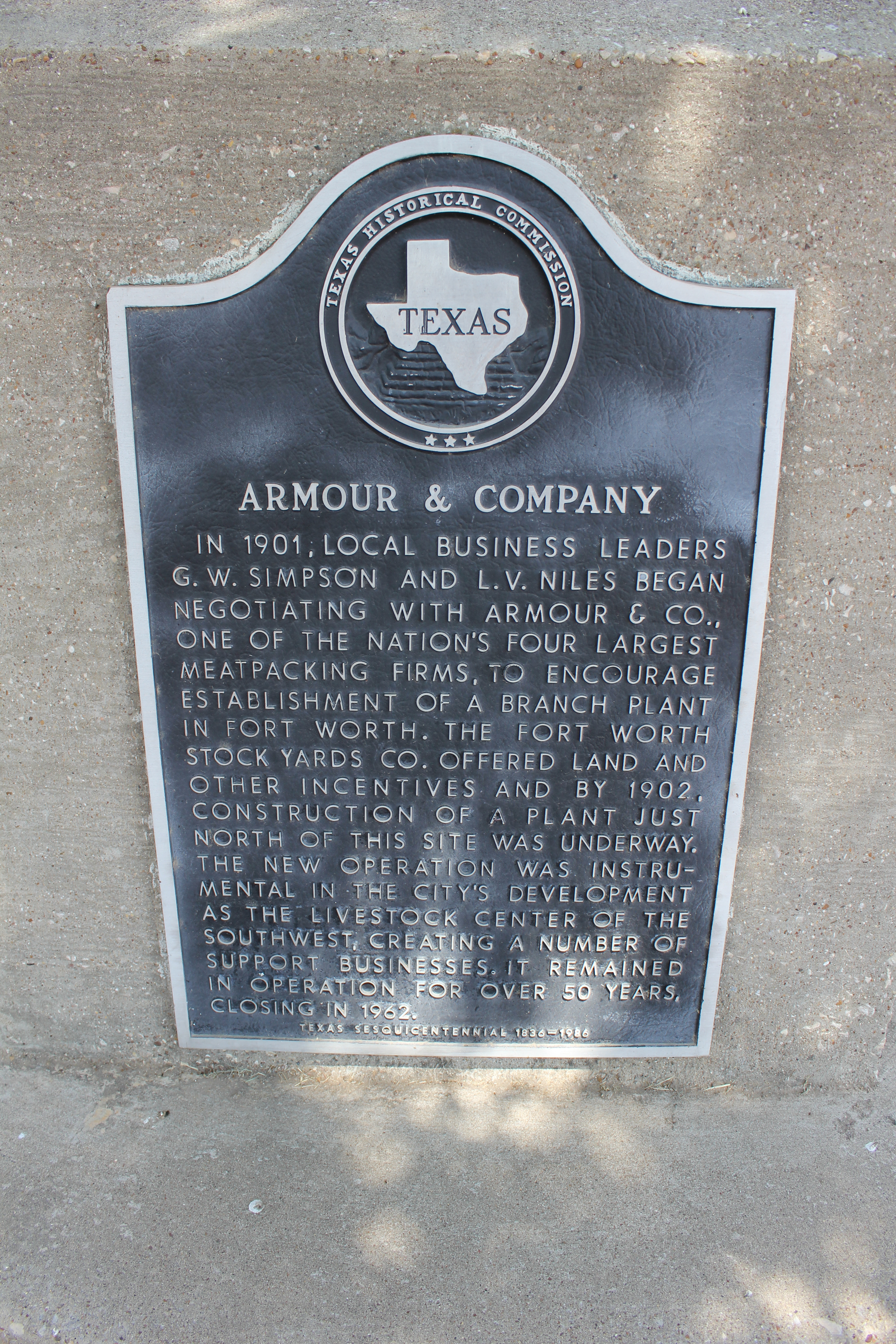
Armour and Company historical marker in Fort Worth, Texas; the company closed its operations there in 1962

In 1970, Armour and Company was acquired by Chicago-based bus company Greyhound Corporation after a hostile takeover attempt by General Host Corporation a year before. Prior to the hostile takeover bid by General Host, the company had originally planned to merge with Gulf and Western Industries in 1968.

In 1971, Greyhound relocated Armour's headquarters from Chicago to Phoenix, Arizona, to a new $83-million building. Rock icon Stevie Nicks' father, Jess Nicks, who was a Greyhound executive, became president of Armour.

In 1978, Greyhound sold Armour Pharmaceuticals to Revlon. Revlon sold its drug unit in 1985 to Rorer (later known as Rhône-Poulenc Rorer). Forest Laboratories acquired the rights to Armour Thyroid from Rhone-Poulenc Rorer in 1991. The remaining assets of Armour Pharmaceuticals are now part of CSL Behring. Armour's Factor VIII product "Factorate" was widely reported as infecting thousands of hemophiliacs worldwide with HIV during the 1980s; there have also been allegations that the firm suppressed evidence showing the product was defective. As a result, there have been lawsuits, inquiries and criminal charges.

Greyhound's rapid diversification and frequent unit restructurings led to erratic profitability. In 1981, John W. Teets was appointed chairman of Greyhound and began selling unprofitable subsidiaries. After meat packers struck at the Armour plants in the early-1980s, Teets shut 29 facilities and sold Armour Food Company to ConAgra in 1983 but kept the Armour Star canned meat business. Armour-Dial continued to manufacture the canned meat products using the Armour Star trademark under license from ConAgra.

=== 1985–2000 ===
In 1985, Greyhound acquired the household products business of Purex Industries, Inc. in 1985 and combined it with Armour-Dial to form The Dial Corporation.

In late 1995, parent company Greyhound (renamed The Dial Corp in 1991) announced its intention to spin off the Dial consumer-products business. Afterwards, Dial's former parent company was renamed Viad Corp, consisting of the service businesses. The Dial consumer business was reborn as the new Dial Corporation, relocating its corporate offices to Scottsdale, Arizona, adjacent to its long-time research and development facility. Under new CEO Malcolm Jozoff, a former P&G executive, the new Dial Corporation underwent major layoffs in the fall of 1996 and a series of financially disastrous acquisitions the following four years. In 2000, Jozoff was replaced by Herbert Baum with a mandate from the board of directors to find a suitable buyer for the company.

=== 2000–present ===
Dial was acquired by Henkel KGaA of Düsseldorf, Germany in March 2004. The food business of Dial, including Armour Star canned meats, was sold to Pinnacle Foods in March 2006. In 2007 Pinnacle Foods was acquired by the Blackstone Group, a New York City-based private equity firm. Conagra acquired Pinnacle Foods for $10.9 billion in 2018.

In July 2006, ConAgra sold most of their refrigerated meats businesses, including the Armour brand, to Smithfield Foods.

== See also ==
- Treet
- Armour Refrigerator Line
- Desiccated thyroid extract (Armour Thyroid)
- Lester Pearson, former Canadian Prime Minister and Nobel Peace Prize winner, worked at Armour meat plant in Chicago.
