= Quinney =

Quinney is a surname. Notable people with the surname include:

- Electa Quinney (1798–1885), Mohican educator
- Gage Quinney (born 1995), Canadian-American ice hockey player
- Jeff Quinney (born 1978), American golfer
- John Wannuaucon Quinney (1797–1855), Mahican (also Stockbridge) diplomat
- Ken Quinney (born 1965), Canadian ice hockey player
- Peter Quinney (born 1986), Canadian football player
- Richard Quinney (born 1934), American sociologist, writer, and photographer
- Robert Quinney (born 1976), English organist and choir director

== See also ==
- Quinney, Wisconsin
- Joe Quinney Winter Sports Center
- S.J. Quinney College of Law
- Quinneys
