= Stockbridge =

Stockbridge may refer to:

== Places ==
=== United Kingdom ===
- Stockbridge, Edinburgh, a district of Edinburgh, Scotland
- Stockbridge, Hampshire
- Stockbridge, West Sussex
- Stockbridge Anticline, one of a series of parallel east–west trending folds in the Cretaceous chalk of Hampshire
- Stockbridge Village, Liverpool
- Stockbridge (UK Parliament constituency)

=== United States ===
- Stockbridge, Georgia
- Stockbridge, Massachusetts
- Stockbridge, Michigan
- Stockbridge Township, Michigan
- Stockbridge, New York
- Stockbridge, Vermont
- Stockbridge, Wisconsin
- Stockbridge (town), Wisconsin
- Stockbridge Bowl, artificially impounded body of water north of Stockbridge, Massachusetts
- Stockbridge Falls, a waterfall located on Oneida Creek southwest of Munnsville, New York

== Structures ==
- Stockbridge Casino, a historic building in Stockbridge, Massachusetts
- Stockbridge House, historic building in Colorado Springs, Colorado, a.k.a. Amarillo Motel
- Stockbridge High School, a high school in Stockbridge, Georgia, Henry County School District
- Stockbridge Indian Cemetery, a cemetery north of Stockbridge, Wisconsin
- Stockbridge public library, Edinburgh
- Stockbridge Racecourse, a horse racing venue in Hampshire, England which closed in 1898
- Stockbridge School, a "progressive" co-educational boarding school for adolescents near Stockbridge, Massachusetts, 1948–1976
- Stockbridge School of Agriculture, at the University of Massachusetts Amherst
- Stockbridge War Memorial, a First World War memorial in the town of Stockbridge in Hampshire in southern England

== People ==
- Francis B. Stockbridge (1826–1894), U.S. Senator from Michigan
- Levi Stockbridge (1820–1904), farmer and scientist from Hadley, Massachusetts
- Nellie Stockbridge (1868–1965), early Idaho frontier mining district photographer
- Richard Stockbridge, distinguished professor of Mathematics at the University of Wisconsin-Milwaukee
- Robert Stockbridge, a fictional character TV show Upstairs, Downstairs
- Sara Stockbridge (born 1966), English model, actress, and author
- William Stockbridge (1782–1850), American merchant and ship owner

== Other uses ==
- Stockbridge damper, a device for suppressing wind-induced vibration on power lines
- Stockbridge Indians, a Native American tribe
- Stockbridge Mission Station, Eagletown, Oklahoma
- Stockbridge Capital Group, a private-equity estate investment company based in San Francisco

== See also ==
- Sockbridge
- Stocksbridge
