= Electa Quinney =

American teacher (c. 1798 – 1885)

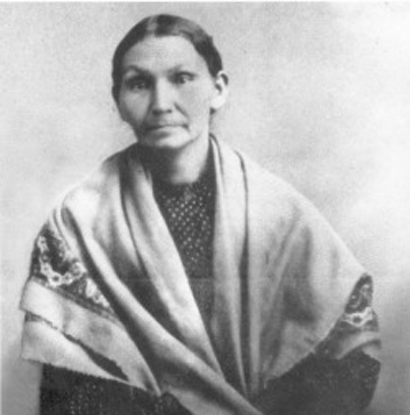
- Quinney around age 60
- Born: Electa Quinney c. 1798; Clinton, New York
- Died: 1885; Stockbridge, Wisconsin
- Other names: Electa W. Quinney, Electa W. Adams, Electa W. Candy
- Citizenship: American
- Occupation: teacher
- Years active: 1821–1844
- Known for: first woman to teach in what would become Wisconsin

Electa Quinney (Mahican name: Wuh-weh-wee-nee-meew Quan-au-kaunt) (c. 1798 – 1885) was a Mohican and member of the Stockbridge-Munsee Community. She founded one of the first schools in what would become Wisconsin and was the first woman to teach in a public school in the territory which would be Wisconsin.

== Early life ==
Electa Quinney was born around 1798 (Note: Numerous birth dates are given for Quinney. McBride places the year around 1798, Saemann cites circa 1807, and the 1902 Inter Ocean newspaper article states her tombstone showed 1810. If indeed she taught from 1821, the 1807 date would make her 14 years old and the 1810 date would make her 11. Credence is given to the earliest date based on Davidson which was published in 1893, "...she died about 8 years ago..." and then in the footnote, she was born about 87 years ago. (1893–8 = 1885 which confirms other death dates, and if she was 87 years old at death 1885–87 = 1798).) in Clinton, New York, into the Housatonic or Stockbridge tribe. She was schooled at a Quaker school on Long Island, New York, where she spent four years, and in Clinton at the Clinton Female Seminary, which opened in 1814. Later she studied for six years at the women's seminary in Cornwall, Connecticut. She was the sister of John Wannuaucon Quinney who led her tribe west when they relocated from New York to the Menominee lands. Her father was probably Joseph Quinney, a sachem of the tribe while her mother, Margaret, was the daughter of David Nau-nau-neek-nuk who was also a Stockbridge sachem. Quinney's name in her native Mahican language was Wuh-weh-wee-nee-meew Quan-au-kaunt.

== Career ==
Upon completing her education around 1821, Quinney taught at a mission school in New York for six years. She relocated west around 1827 and by 1828 had established a school at Statesburg, near Grande Kawkawlin. Quinney taught between forty and fifty students at her school, which was the first public school in Wisconsin making her the first woman school teacher in the Wisconsin part of Michigan Territory. She taught four classes in a log school house, which was connected with a Presbyterian mission. Though most of her students were Indian, they studied in English and she used standard texts to teach arithmetic, geography, language, oration, penmanship and spelling.

In 1832, the Methodists re-established contact with the Oneida Nation after their relocation to Wisconsin. Their first missionary, Daniel Adams, a Canadian Mohawk established a mission school near Green Bay, at which Quinney became the first teacher that same year. Around 1835, Quinney and Adams married and moved to Missouri where they had three sons: Alexander (born 1838), Daniel (born 1840) and John C. Adams (born 1843), who would become a politician and who fought for the overturn of the 1871 Stockbridge-Munsee constitution until 1893 when his efforts finally succeeded. Daniel's mission was with the Seneca Indians, who occupied a tract on the Neosho River in the Missouri Territory and were later moved to a section of the Cherokee Reservation in the northernmost corner of Indian Territory working the Seneca Circuit. Daniel died in 1843, but Adams continued working for the Methodist Mission Service.

Adams married a second time with a Cherokee newspaper editor, John Walker Candy, whose Cherokee name was Dâguwadâ. His first wife was Mary Ann Watie, sister of Stand Watie. He had begun his career as a printer in New Echota, Georgia first serving as an apprentice on the Cherokee Phoenix. John came to the Cherokee Nation in Indian Territory one year prior to the removal to establish the printing office at the Union Mission. In 1840, he printed the earliest volume of Choctaw laws and helped relocate the press to Park Hill, where he printed the 1842 Cherokee Constitution and Laws. John and Adams married on Christmas day in 1845 in the Seneca lands and he remained with the Union Mission press until 1847. John then worked at the Cherokee Advocate when it was established in Tahlequah. In 1855 he became the printer for the Baptist Mission Press. By 1860, the couple had returned to Wisconsin and were living in Stockbridge, though John's 1868 death occurred near Webbers Falls, Indian Territory. In 1880, she was living in Stockbridge with her son John.

Quinney died in 1885 in Stockbridge, Wisconsin. She is buried in the Stockbridge Indian Cemetery, which is on the National Register of Historic Places. As of 1993, her stone was missing, however as of 2022, a headstone for her sits in the cemetery. Posthumously, the Electa Quinney Institute for American Indian Education at the University of Wisconsin–Milwaukee was named in her honor. Additionally, a statue of Quinney sits in a park in Kaukauna.

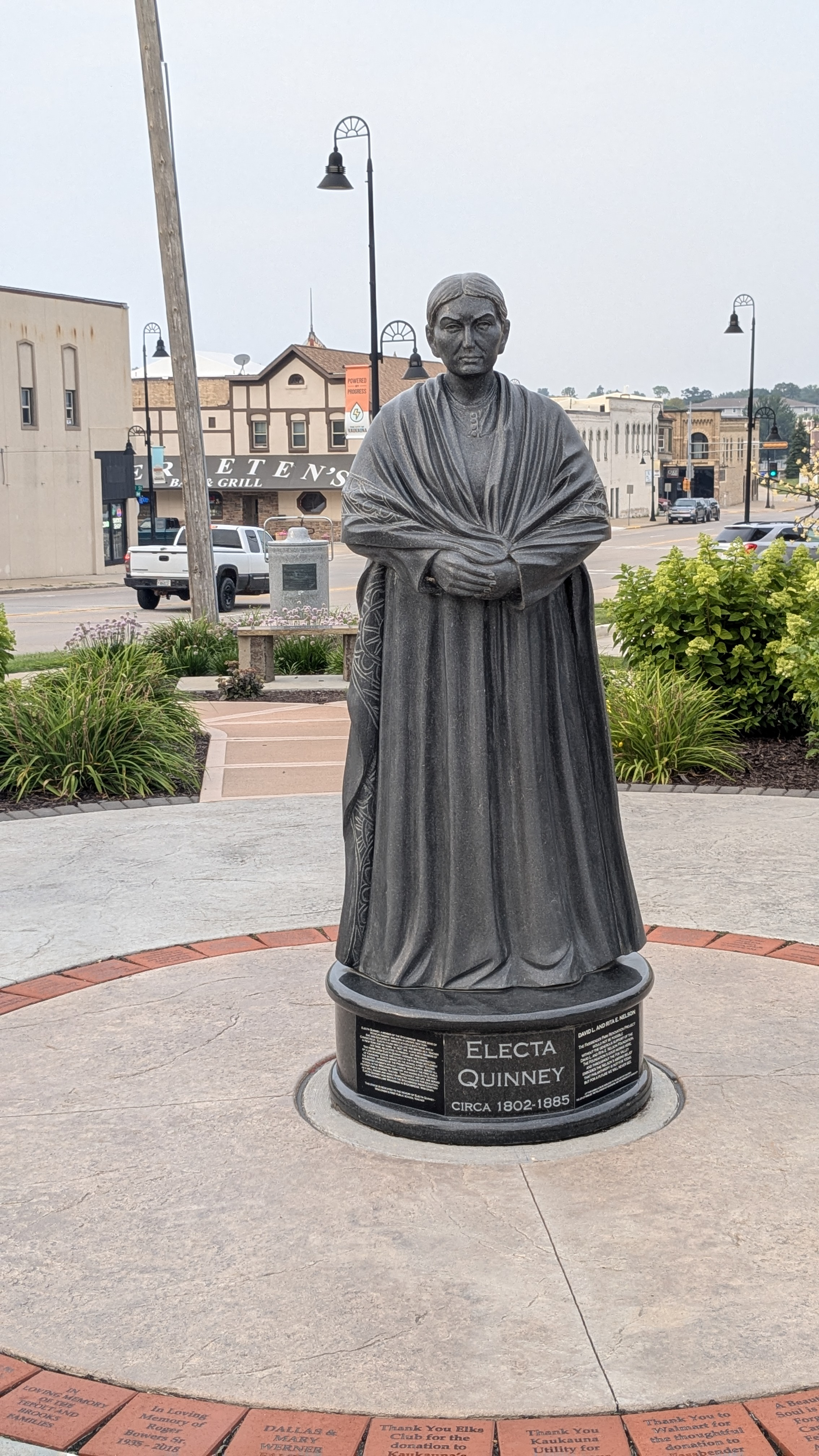
Electa Quinney Statue in Kaukauna

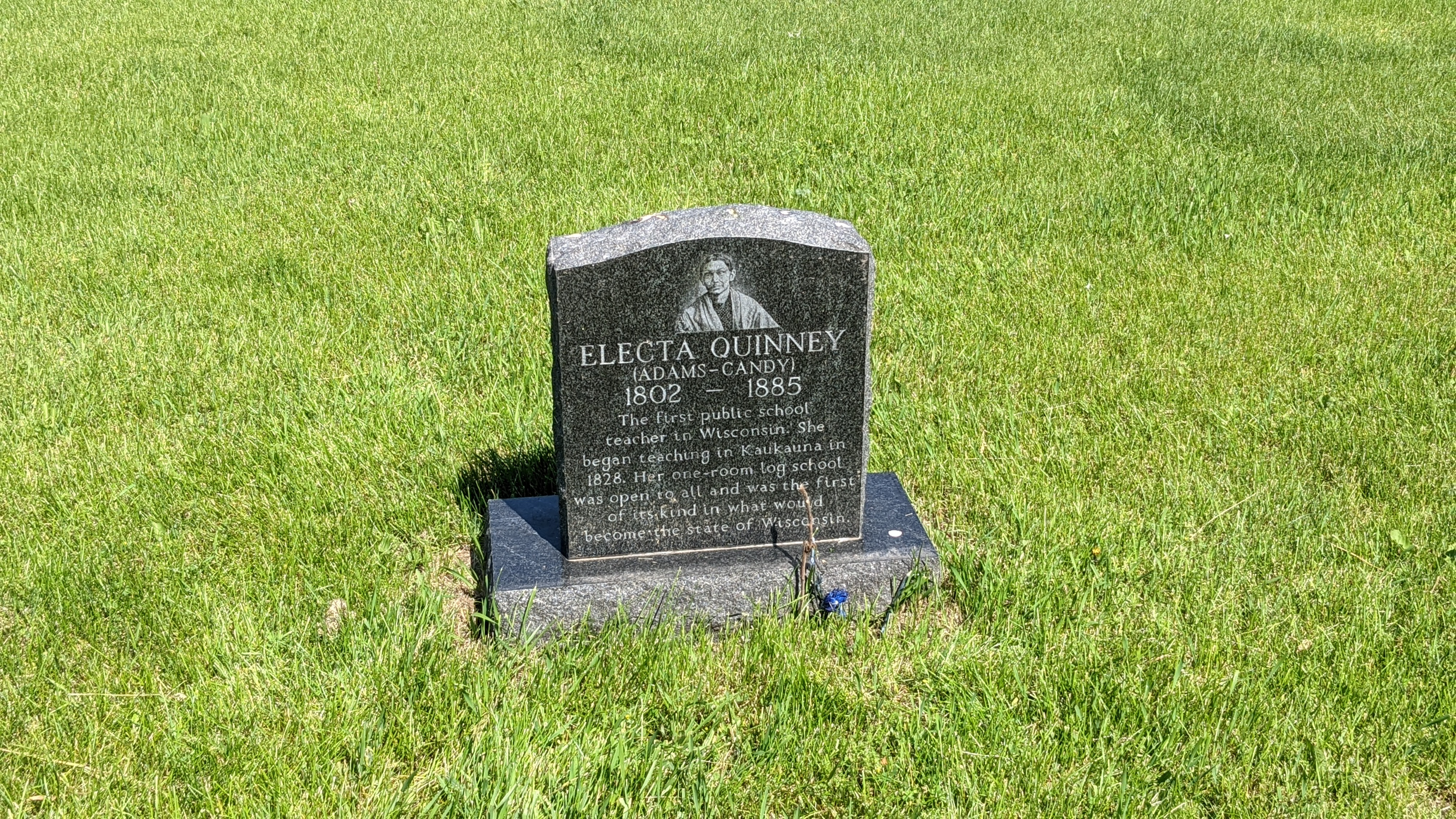
Electa Quinney's Headstone in Stockbridge Indian Cemetery
