= Kloten, Wisconsin =

- Unincorporated community
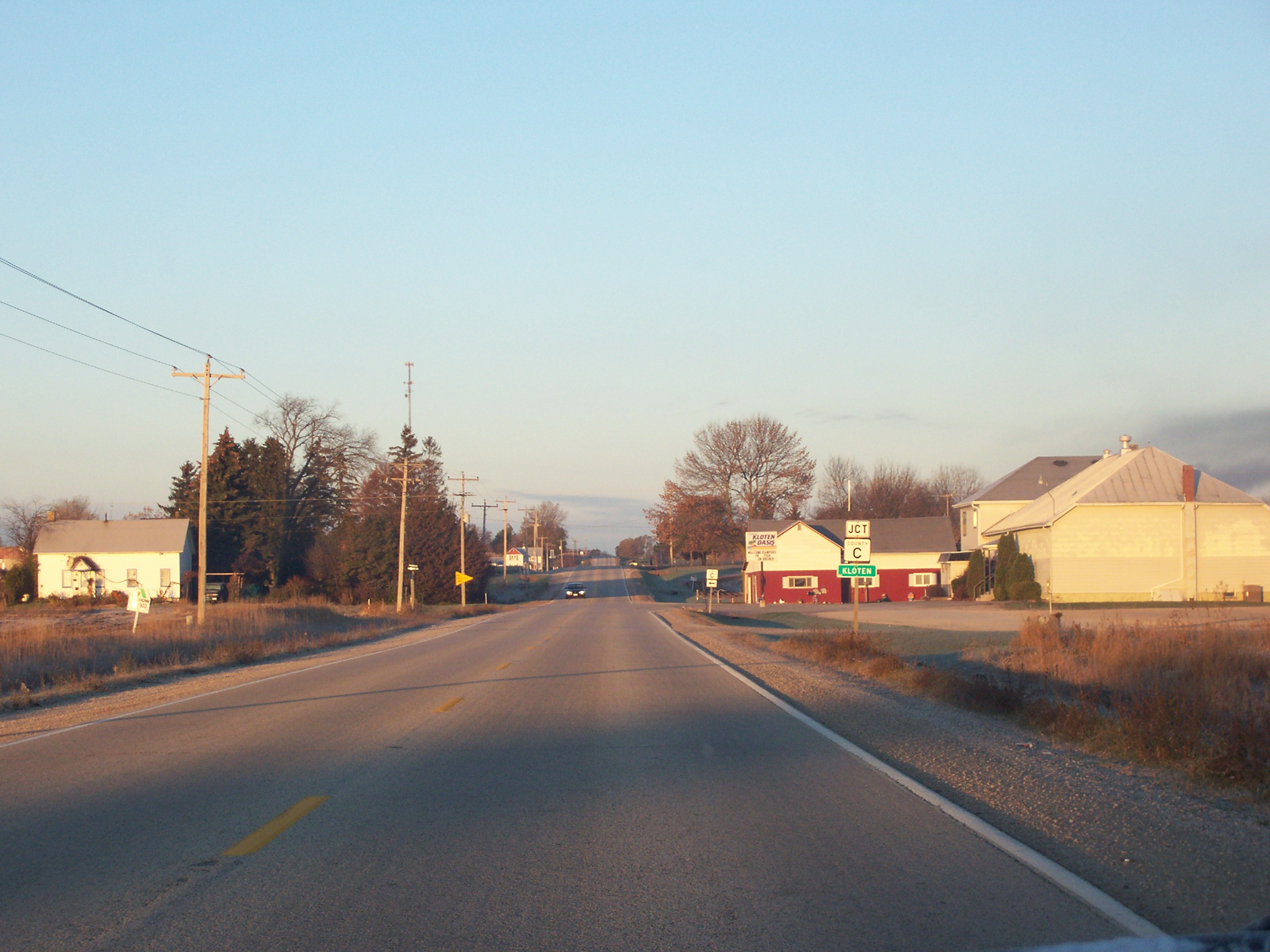
- Looking west at Kloten

- Location within the state of Wisconsin
- Coordinates: 44°2′5″N 88°15′57″W
- Country: United States
- State: Wisconsin
- County: Calumet
- Town: Stockbridge
- Time zone: UTC-6 (Central (CST))
  - Summer (DST): UTC-5 (CDT)
- Area code: 920

Kloten, Wisconsin is an unincorporated community in the town of Stockbridge in Calumet County, Wisconsin, United States. The community is located at the intersection of County Highways F and C, approximately 3 miles (5 km) east of Lake Winnebago and 5 miles (8 km) west of Chilton.

Kloten is named after Kloten, Switzerland.

== Notable people ==
- Ty Bodden, Wisconsin legislator

== Images ==
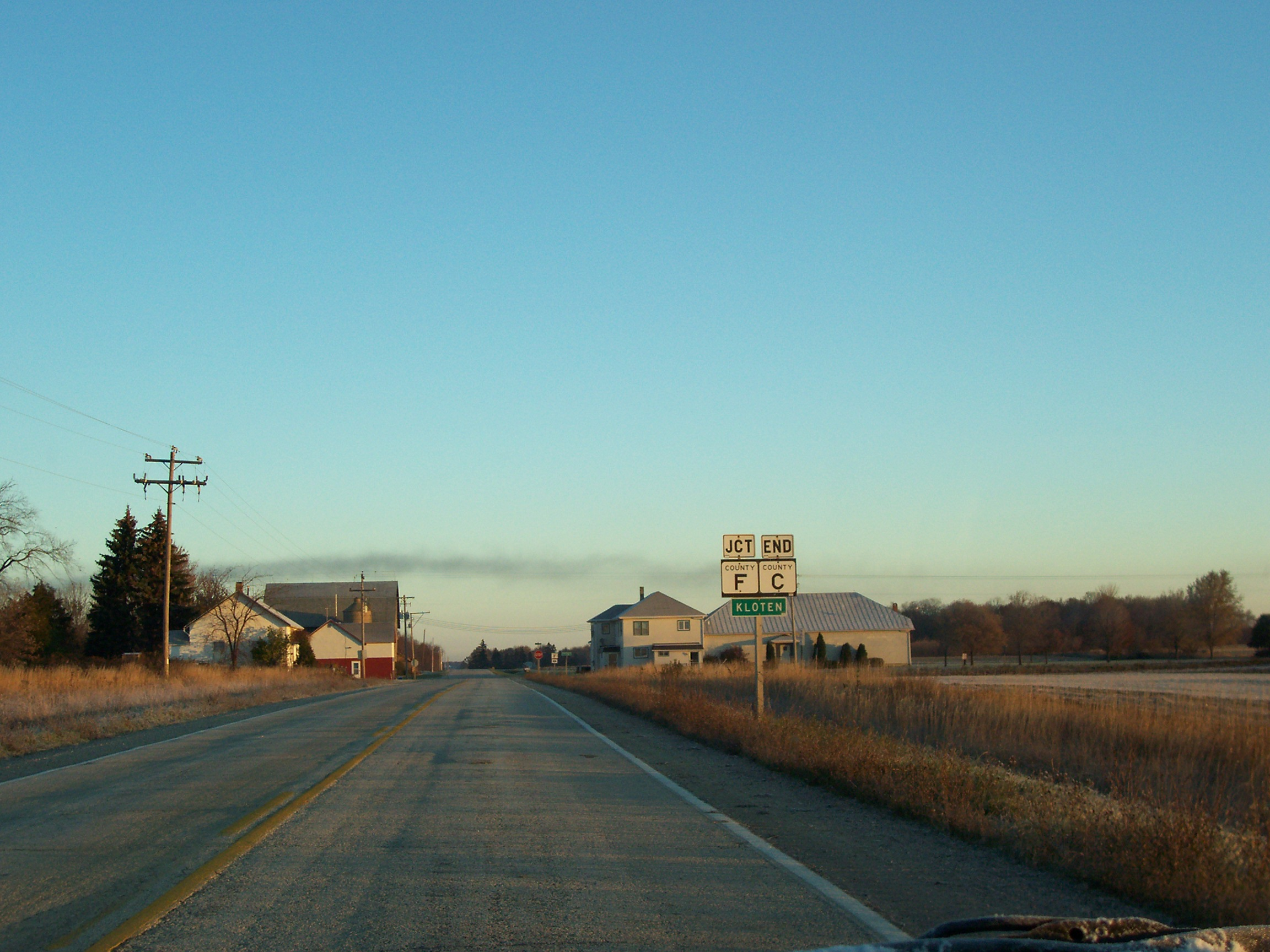
Looking north at Kloten

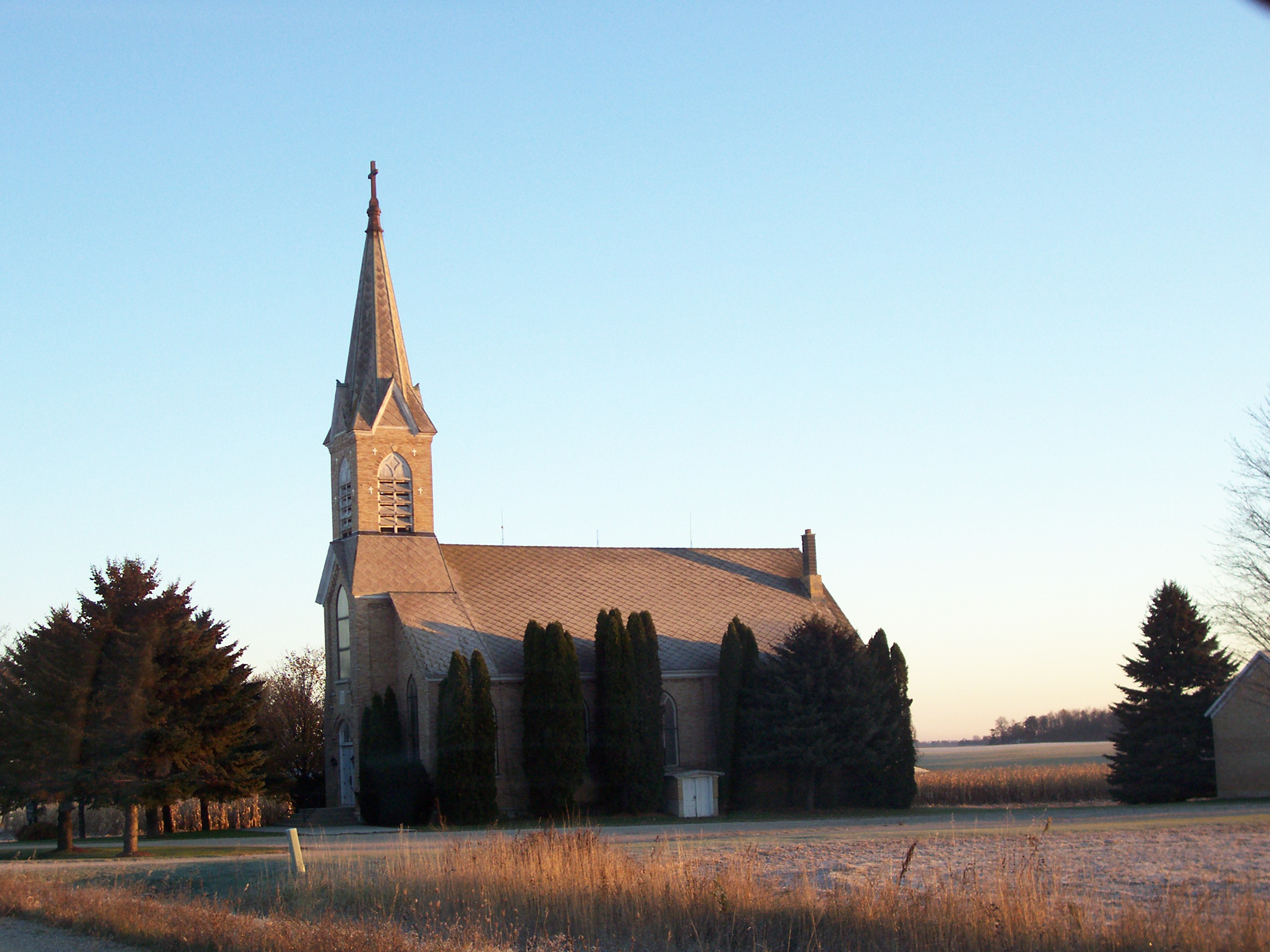
former St. Elizabeth's Church (closed)
