= William Reader (politician) =

American politician

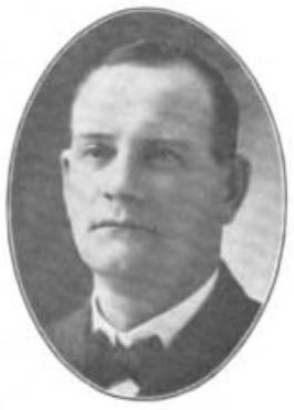

Member of the Wisconsin State Assembly
- In office 1908–1914
- Constituency: Florence, Forest, and Langlade Counties

Personal details
- Born: May 16, 1864 Town of Stockbridge, Wisconsin
- Died: 1935 (aged 70–71)
- Party: Republican
- Spouse: Mary McCabe (m. 1891)
- Children: 4
- Occupation: Farmer, politician

William Reader (May 16, 1864 – 1935) was a member of the Wisconsin State Assembly.

== Biography ==
Reader was born on May 16, 1864, in Stockbridge, Wisconsin. He moved with his parents to Langlade County, Wisconsin, in 1882. Pursuits he followed there include farming and the retail clothing business.

In 1891, Reader married Mary McCabe (1872–1944). They had four children. Reader and others of his family were Roman Catholics. His fraternal affiliations included the Catholic Order of Foresters.

Reader was assaulted in 1916; his attacker chewed Reader's thumb badly and gangrene set in, requiring amputation of the thumb.

== Political career ==
Reader was a member of the Assembly during the 1909 and 1910 sessions. Additionally, he was Chairman (similar to Mayor) of Peck, Wisconsin, and Register of Deeds of Langlade County. He was a Republican.
