= Stockbridge Indian Cemetery =

Historic site in Calumet County, Wisconsin

- U.S. National Register of Historic Places
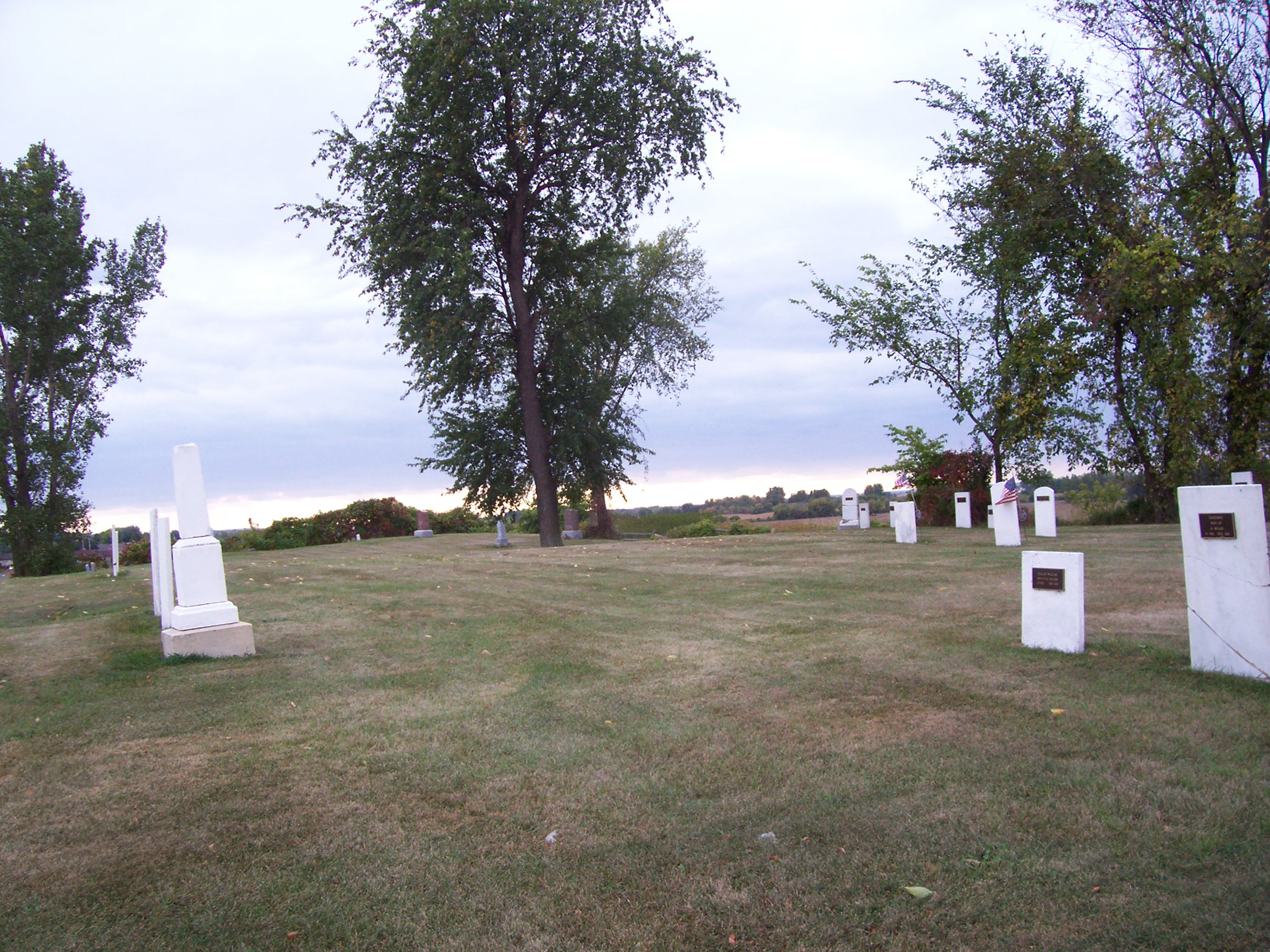
- Looking south at the cemetery
- Location: Moore Road, Stockbridge, Wisconsin
- Coordinates: 44°4′56″N 88°18′3″W
- Built: 1834
- NRHP reference No.: 80000111
- Added to NRHP: October 20, 1980

The Stockbridge Indian Cemetery is a cemetery north of Stockbridge, Wisconsin. It is located on Moore Road just west of Wisconsin Highway 55. The cemetery was established in 1834 after the Stockbridge Indians moved to the community. It was listed on the National Register of Historic Places in 1980.

The Stockbridge initially lived in New York and Massachusetts, but were forced by the federal government to come to Wisconsin. They were largely Christianized farmers and the Indian Commissioners hoped that this acculturation would rub off on the neighboring Indians here. Chief John Metoxin, whose stone is in the cemetery, led them through this movement.

But here again white farmers wanted their land, and in the 1840s the government pushed them to dissolve the tribe or sell their land and move west. After debate within the tribe, they decided to stay together. John Quinney (who is also buried in the cemetery) traveled to Washington repeatedly, arguing for the Stockbridge, and finally obtained the right for them to stay in Wisconsin. Many of them moved to Shawano County, and their descendants live in the Stockbridge-Munsee Community there.

The cemetery is all that remains of the community at Stockbridge.

== Notable interments ==
The cemetery contains interments of Stockbridge Indians. Notable grave sites include:

- John Wannuaucon Quinney, Stockbridge diplomat, wrote the Stockbridge nation's constitution
- Electa Quinney, John's sister, was the first public school teacher in Wisconsin

== Images ==
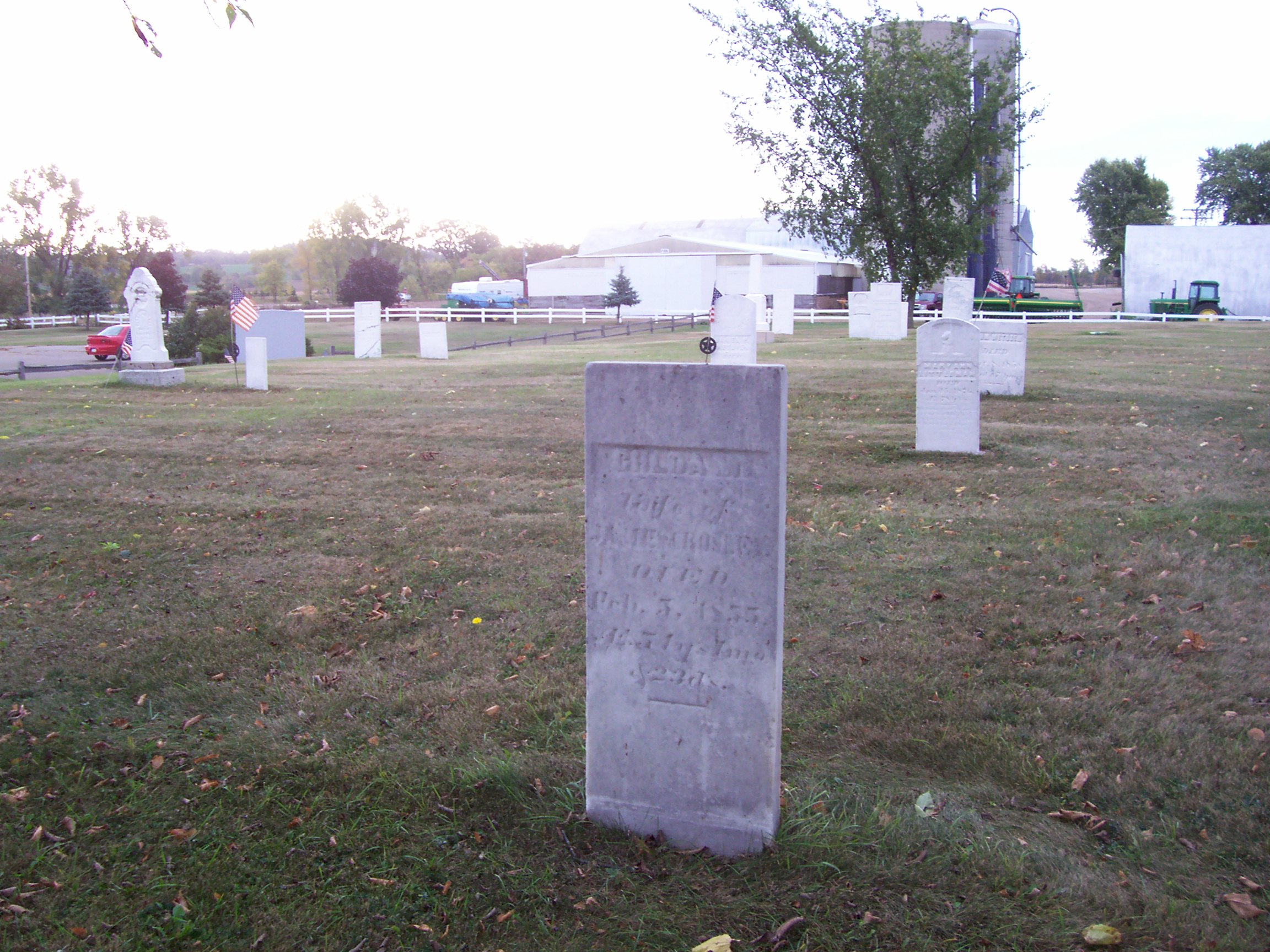
Looking east

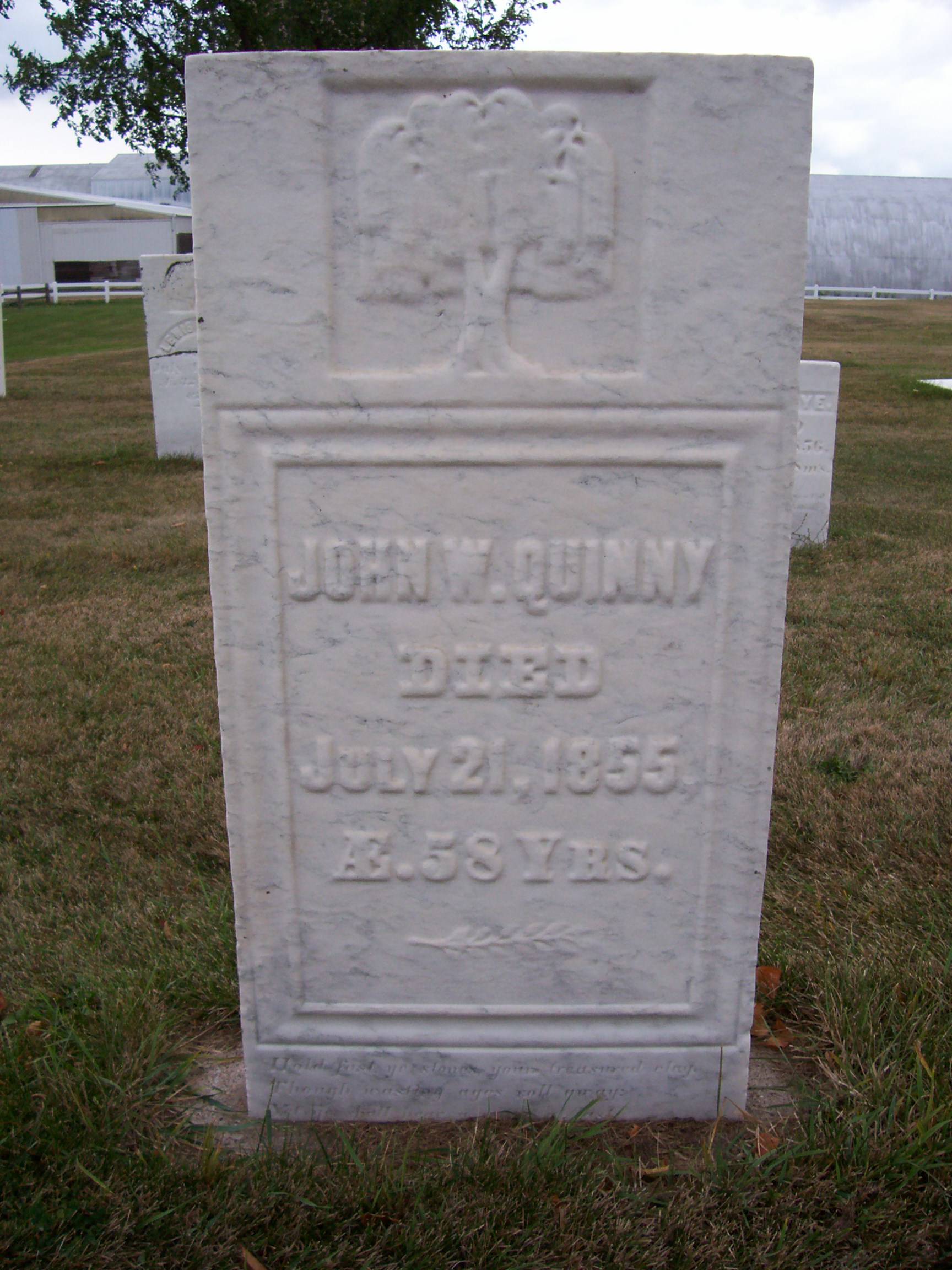
John Wannuaucon Quinney headstone
