= Stockbridge, Wisconsin =

- Village
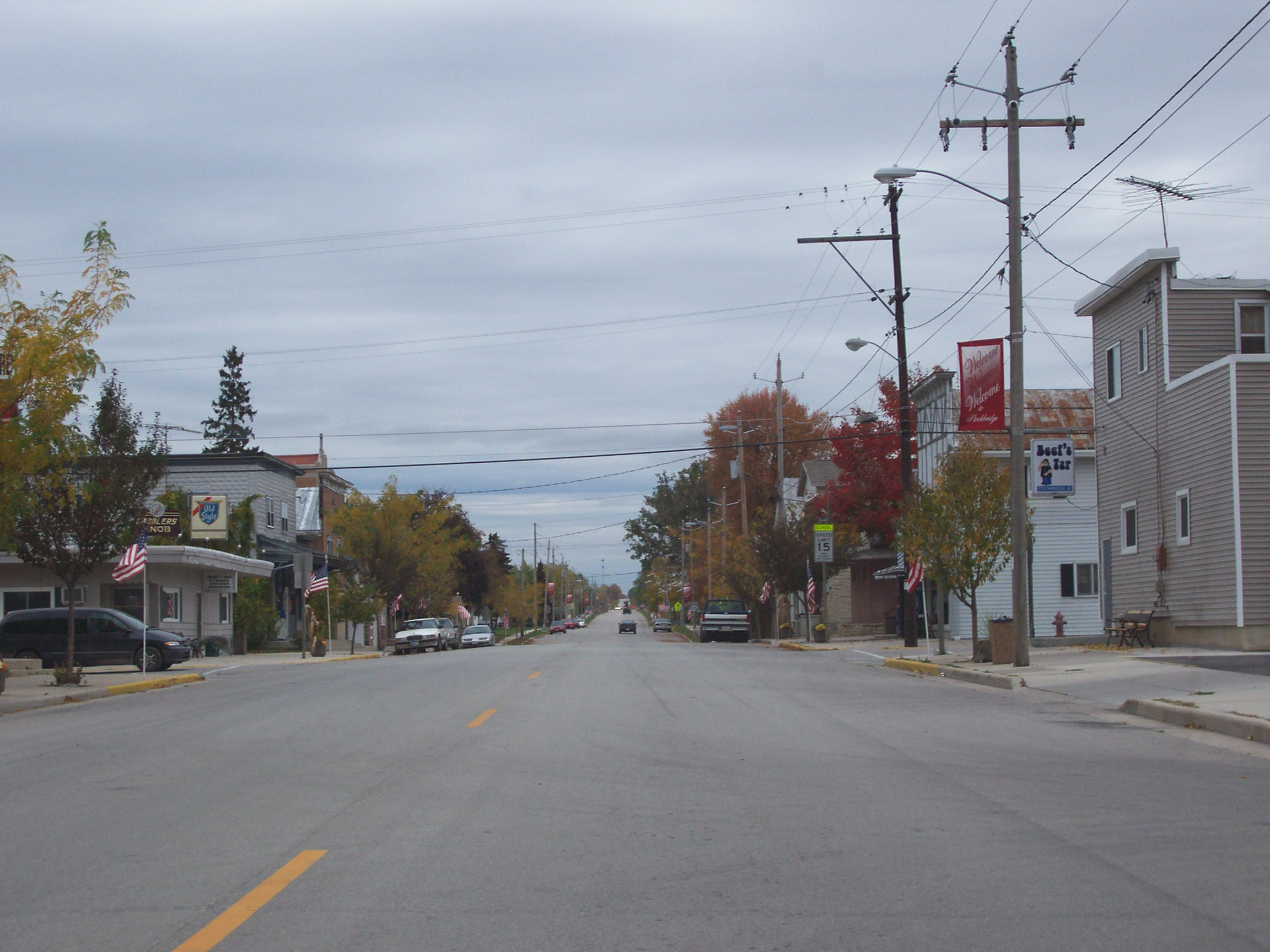
- Along WIS 55 in downtown Stockbridge
- Nickname: The Sturgeon Capital of the World
- Location of Stockbridge in Calumet County, Wisconsin.
- Coordinates: 44°3′36″N 88°16′58″W
- Country: United States
- State: Wisconsin
- County: Calumet

Area
  - Total: 3.25 sq mi (8.43 km^{2})
  - Land: 3.25 sq mi (8.41 km^{2})
  - Water: 0.0077 sq mi (0.02 km^{2})
- Elevation: 771 ft (235 m)

Population (2020)
  - Total: 678
  - Density: 209/sq mi (80.6/km^{2})
- Time zone: UTC-6 (Central (CST))
  - Summer (DST): UTC-5 (CDT)
- ZIP code: 53088
- Area code: 920
- FIPS code: 55-77425
- GNIS feature ID: 1584227
- Website: Village Website

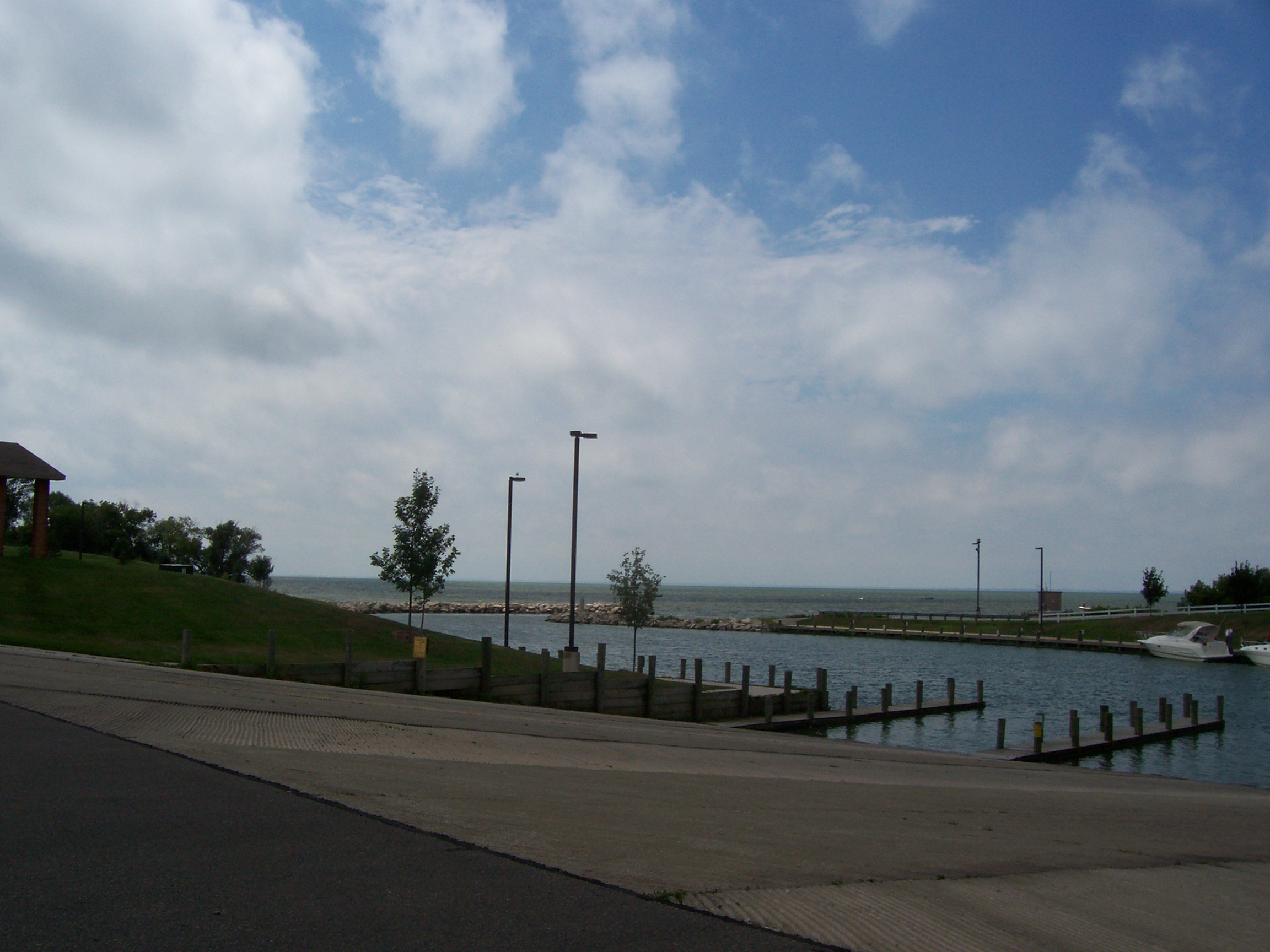
Stockbridge Harbor, Lake Winnebago

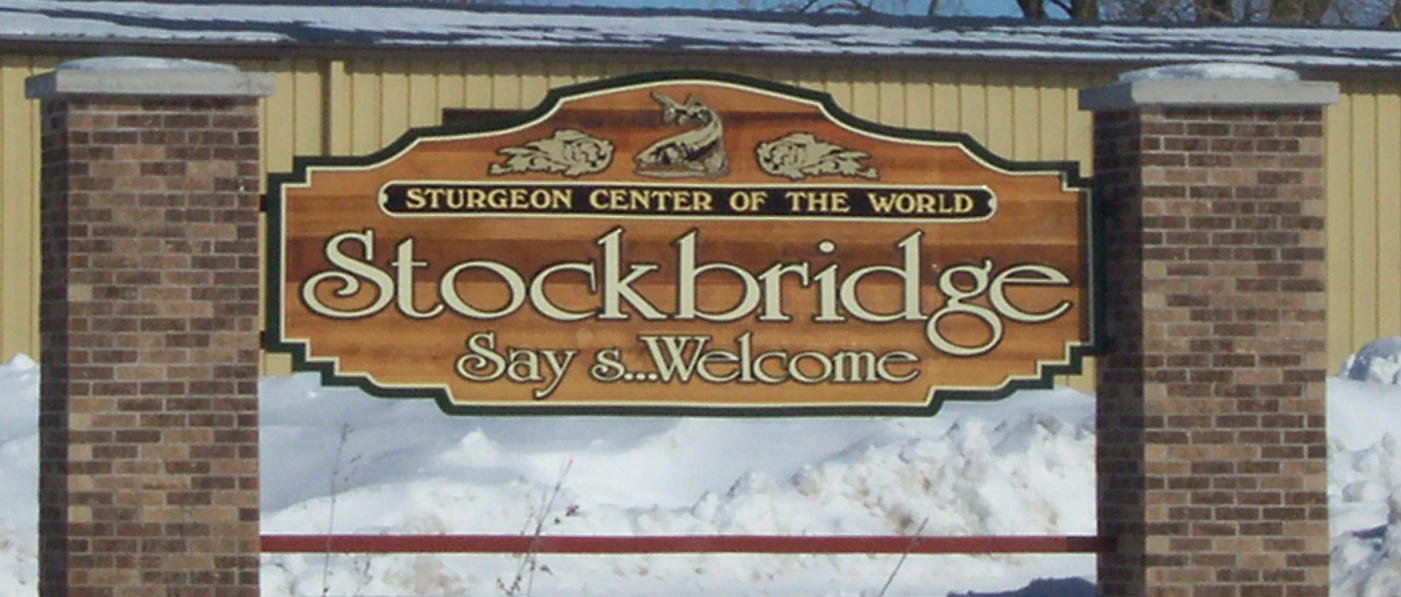
Welcome sign

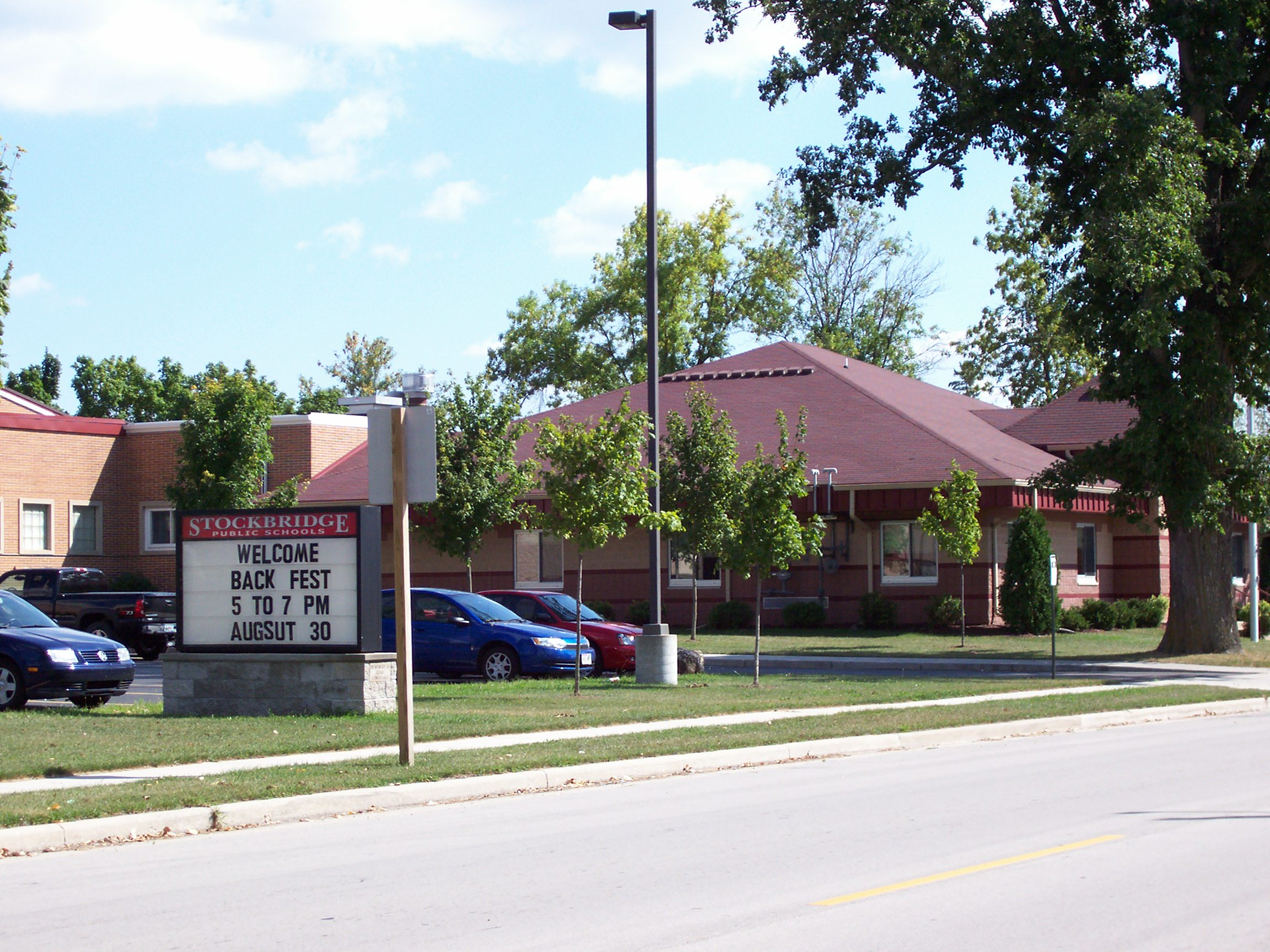
Stockbridge High School

Stockbridge is a village in Calumet County, Wisconsin, United States. The population was 678 at the 2020 census. The village lies within the Town of Stockbridge.

== History ==
Stockbridge is known as "The Sturgeon Capital of the World," and was named after the Stockbridge Indians after they moved here in the 1830s from Stockbridge, New York, where they had settled after being expelled from Stockbridge, Massachusetts.

== Geography ==
Stockbridge is at 44°4′26″N 88°18′57″W (44.074026, -88.316105).

According to the United States Census Bureau, the village has a total area of 3.27 square miles (8.47 km^{2}), of which, 3.26 square miles (8.44 km^{2}) of it is land and 0.01 square miles (0.03 km^{2}) is water.

== Demographics ==
Historical population
Census	Pop.	Note	%±
1910	328		—
1920	387		18.0%
1930	377		−2.6%
1940	386		2.4%
1950	409		6.0%
1960	476		16.4%
1970	582		22.3%
1980	567		−2.6%
1990	579		2.1%
2000	649		12.1%
2010	636		−2.0%
2020	678		6.6%
U.S. Decennial Census

=== 2010 census ===
As of the census of 2010, there were 636 people, 292 households, and 185 families living in the village. The population density was 195.1 inhabitants per square mile (75.3/km^{2}). There were 348 housing units at an average density of 106.7 per square mile (41.2/km^{2}). The racial makeup of the village was 98.7% White, 0.3% Native American, and 0.9% from two or more races. Hispanic or Latino of any race were 0.8% of the population.

There were 292 households, of which 22.3% had children under the age of 18 living with them, 55.5% were married couples living together, 4.1% had a female householder with no husband present, 3.8% had a male householder with no wife present, and 36.6% were non-families. 30.5% of all households were made up of individuals, and 9.6% had someone living alone who was 65 years of age or older. The average household size was 2.18 and the average family size was 2.67.

The median age in the village was 44.8 years. 17.3% of residents were under the age of 18; 7.2% were between the ages of 18 and 24; 25.7% were from 25 to 44; 31.4% were from 45 to 64; and 18.2% were 65 years of age or older. The gender makeup of the village was 51.9% male and 48.1% female.

=== 2000 census ===
As of the census of 2000, there were 649 people, 265 households, and 178 families living in the village. The population density was 196.4 people per square mile (75.9/km^{2}). There were 299 housing units at an average density of 90.5 per square mile (35.0/km^{2}). The racial makeup of the village was 98.77% White, 0.62% Black or African American, 0.15% Native American, 0.15% from other races, and 0.31% from two or more races. 0.15% of the population were Hispanic or Latino of any race.

There were 265 households, out of which 29.8% had children under the age of 18 living with them, 56.6% were married couples living together, 6.4% had a female householder with no husband present, and 32.8% were non-families. 25.7% of all households were made up of individuals, and 9.4% had someone living alone who was 65 years of age or older. The average household size was 2.45 and the average family size was 2.98.

In the village, the population was spread out, with 23.7% under the age of 18, 9.1% from 18 to 24, 29.3% from 25 to 44, 25.7% from 45 to 64, and 12.2% who were 65 years of age or older. The median age was 37 years. For every 100 females, there were 106.0 males. For every 100 females age 18 and over, there were 111.5 males.

The median income for a household in the village was $48,021, and the median income for a family was $56,094. Males had a median income of $38,359 versus $26,375 for females. The per capita income for the village was $21,129. About 1.1% of families and 2.5% of the population were below the poverty line, including none of those under the age of eighteen or sixty-five or over.

== Education ==
Stockbridge High School had 83 students in the 2005–06 school year. As of 2008, 79 students attend the high school. June 2018, the school board approved the return of a soccer program. The high school also has golf, softball, baseball, volleyball, basketball, and other sports. The school's sports teams are known as the Stockbridge Indians. In 2016, the school received a bronze medal when ranked by U.S. News & World Report magazine.

== Historic places ==
Calumet County Park is located 4 miles northeast of the city. The park has effigy mounds.

There are two places in Stockbridge listed on the List of Registered Historic Places in Wisconsin: Stockbridge Harbor and Stockbridge Indian Cemetery.

== Notable people ==
- Lemuel Goodell, Wisconsin legislator
- John Harsh, Wisconsin legislator
- Electa Quinney, educator
- John Wannuaucon Quinney, Stockbridge Indian diplomat, lived in Stockbridge.
- Leopold Strasser, Wisconsin legislator
- Glenn Turner, Wisconsin legislator
- Ty Bodden, Wisconsin legislator
