= Quinney, Wisconsin =

- Unincorporated community
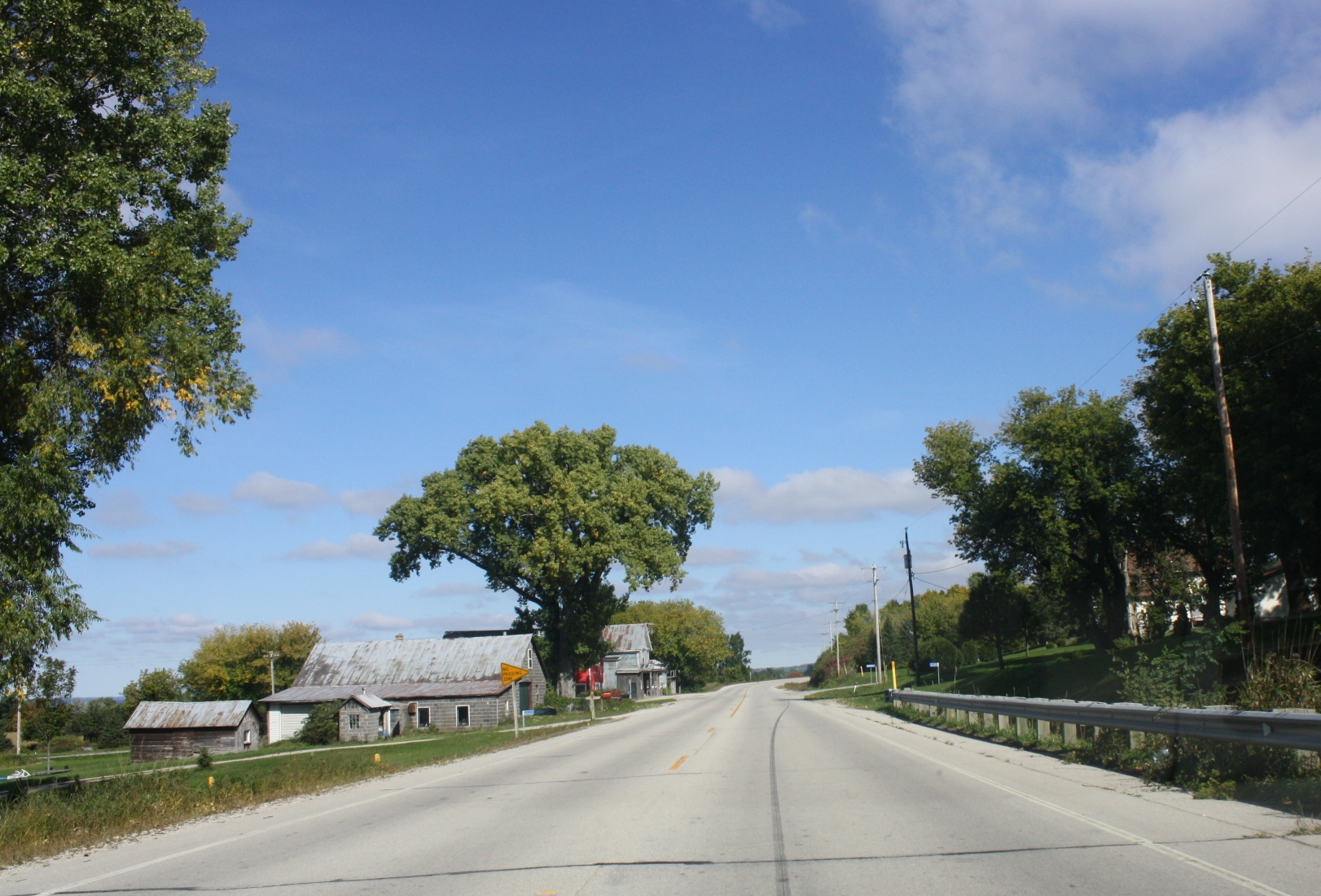
- Looking north at Quinney on WIS 55

- Location within Wisconsin Location within the United States
- Coordinates: 44°00′52″N 88°18′26″W
- Country: United States
- State: Wisconsin
- County: Calumet
- Town: Stockbridge
- Elevation: 869 ft (265 m)
- Time zone: UTC-6 (Central (CST))
  - Summer (DST): UTC-5 (CDT)
- Area code: 920
- GNIS feature ID: 1577782

Quinney is an unincorporated community in the town of Stockbridge, Calumet County, Wisconsin, United States. It is located along Wisconsin Highway 55 approximately one mile (1 km) north of its southern terminus. The Military Ridge Road ran through the community. Quinney was named for Austin E. and John W. Quinney who were two Mohican brothers who led a group of settlers from New York in the 1820s. Quinney was featured as the town of the week on the radio program, Whad'ya Know on 10 August 1985.
