= Quinneys =

Quinneys may refer to:

- Quinneys (novel), by the British writer Horace Annesley Vachell
- Quinneys (play), a stage version
- Quinneys (1919 film), a British film
- Quinneys (1927 film), a British film
