= Richard H. Stockbridge =

Richard Stockbridge
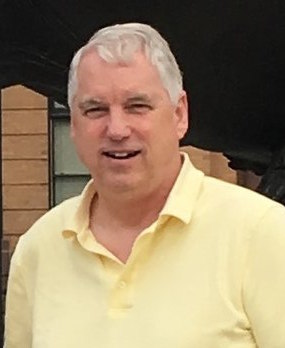
- Stockbridge in 2017.
- Education: University of Wisconsin-Madison, St. Lawrence University
- Known for: Applied Probability, Stochastic Control Theory
- Scientific career
- Fields: Mathematics
- Workplaces: Case Western Reserve University, University of Kentucky, University of Wisconsin-Milwaukee
- Thesis: Time-Average Control of Martingale Problems
- Doctoral advisor: Thomas G. Kurtz

Richard H. Stockbridge is a Distinguished Professor Emeritus of Mathematics at the University of Wisconsin-Milwaukee. His contributions to research primarily involve stochastic control theory, optimal stopping and mathematical finance. Most notably, alongside Professors Thomas G. Kurtz, Kurt Helmes, and Chao Zhu, he developed the methodology of using linear programming to solve stochastic control problems.

== Education ==
Stockbridge obtained his Ph.D. from the University of Wisconsin-Madison under the supervision of Thomas G. Kurtz with a dissertation entitled "Time-Average Control of Martingale Problems". He also holds a master's degree in mathematics from the University of Wisconsin-Madison and attended St. Lawrence University in Canton, New York, for his baccalaureate studies.

== Academic career ==
Following the awarding of his Ph.D., Stockbridge served as an assistant professor in the Department of Mathematics and Statistics at Case Western Reserve University from 1987 to 1988. He then took an assistant professor position at the University of Kentucky from 1988 to 1993, leading to an associate professorship which he held until 2000. Later, Stockbridge began working at the University of Wisconsin-Milwaukee and became a full professor in 2002. In 2018, he was awarded the title of "distinguished professor" by the University of Wisconsin Milwaukee Distinguished Faculty Committee.

Stockbridge has also held various visiting positions, including:

- Visiting Scholar, Heriot Watt University, School of Mathematical and Computer Science, Edinburgh, Scotland, March–August 2016
- Sabbaticant Professor, University of Botswana, Department of Mathematics, July 2008 – January 2009
- Visiting Fellow, Bath University, Department of Mathematical Sciences, Bath, England, January–July 1997
- Visiting Assistant Professor, University of Kentucky, Department of Mathematics, Lexington, Kentucky, 1988–89

== Research ==
Professor Stockbridge's research is focused on developing linear programming techniques in stochastic control. These techniques give an alternative formulation to the traditional dynamic programming framework used in stochastic control problems and have been demonstrated in examples including control of the running maximum of a diffusion, optimal stopping problems, and regime-switching diffusions.

Through the completion of his Ph.D. dissertation, Stockbridge examined the relationship between long-term average stochastic control problems and linear programs spanning the space of stationary distributions for that controlled process, ultimately concluding their equivalence. This dissertation served as a basis for significant work in the field.

Following his graduate studies, Stockbridge helped expand the applications of this equivalence between linear programming and stochastic control to include discounted, first-exit and finite horizon problems.

== Publications ==
Notable publications by Richard Stockbridge include:

- Stockbridge, RH (1990), "Time-Average Control of Martingale Problems: Existence of a Stationary Solution", Annals of Probability, 18: 190–205, doi:10.1214/aop/1176990944
- Stockbridge, RH (1990), "Time-Average Control of Martingale Problems: A Linear Programming Formulation", Annals of Probability, 18: 206–217, doi:10.1214/aop/1176990945
- Heinricher, AC; Stockbridge, RH (1992), "Optimal Control and Replacement with State-dependent Failure Rate", in Duncan, T.; Pasik-Duncan, B. (eds.), Stochastic Theory and Adaptive Control, Lecture Notes in Control and Information Sciences, vol. 184, pp. 240–247, doi:10.1007/BFb0113244, ISBN 978-3-540-55962-7
- Kurtz, TG; Stockbridge, RH (1998), "Existence of Markov Controls and Characterization of Optimal Markov Controls", SIAM Journal on Control and Optimization, 36 (2): 609–653, doi:10.1137/S0363012995295516
- K, Helmes; Röhl, S; Stockbridge, RH (2001), "Computing Moments of the Exit Time Distribution for Markov Processes by Linear Programming", Operations Research, 49 (4): 516–530, doi:10.1287/opre.49.4.516.11221
- Cho, MJ; Stockbridge, RH (2002), "Linear Programming Formulation for Optimal Stopping Problems", SIAM Journal on Control and Optimization, 40 (6): 1965–1982, doi:10.1137/S0363012900377663
- Helmes, KL; Stockbridge, RH (2008), Ethier, SN; Feng, J; Stockbridge, RH (eds.), "Determining the Optimal Control of Singular Stochastic Processes using Linear Programming", IMS Collections, 4: 137–153
- Helmes, KL; Stockbridge, RH (2010), "Construction of the Value Function and Stopping Rules for Optimal Stopping of One-Dimensional Diffusions", Advances in Applied Probability, 42: 158–182, doi:10.1239/aap/1269611148
- Helmes, KL; Stockbridge, RH (2011), "Thinning and Harvesting of Stochastic Forest Models", Journal of Economic Dynamics and Control, 35: 25–39, doi:10.1016/j.jedc.2010.10.007, S2CID 17474105
- Song, Q; Stockbridge, RH; Zhu, C (2011), "On Optimal Harvesting Problems in Random Environments", SIAM Journal on Control and Optimization, 49 (2): 859–889, arXiv:1004.4250, doi:10.1137/100797333, S2CID 8160961
- Dufour, F; Stockbridge, RH (2011), "On the Existence of Strict Optimal Controls for Constrained, Controlled Markov Processes in Continuous-Time", Stochastics, 84 (1): 55–78, doi:10.1080/17442508.2011.580347, S2CID 120856374
- Stockbridge, RH (2014), "Discussion of Dynamic Programming and Linear Programming Approaches to Stochastic Control and Optimal Stopping in Continuous Time", Metrika, 77: 137–162, doi:10.1007/s00184-013-0476-2, S2CID 121104300
- KL, Helmes; Stockbridge, RH; Zhu, C (2015), "A Measure Approach for Continuous Inventory Models: Discounted Cost Criterion", SIAM Journal on Control and Optimization, 53 (4): 2100–2140, doi:10.1137/140972640
- Helmes, KL; Stockbridge, RH; Zhu, C (2017), "Continuous Inventory Models of Diffusion Type: Long-term Average Cost Criterion", Annals of Applied Probability, 27 (3): 1831–1885, arXiv:1510.06656, doi:10.1214/16-AAP1247, S2CID 119175579
