= John Wannuaucon Quinney =

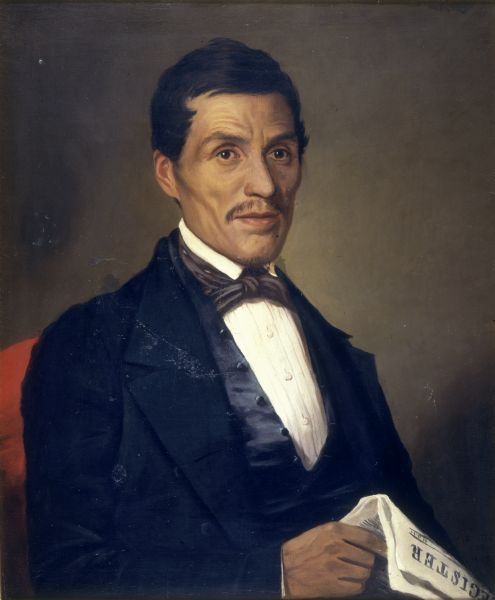
Quinney

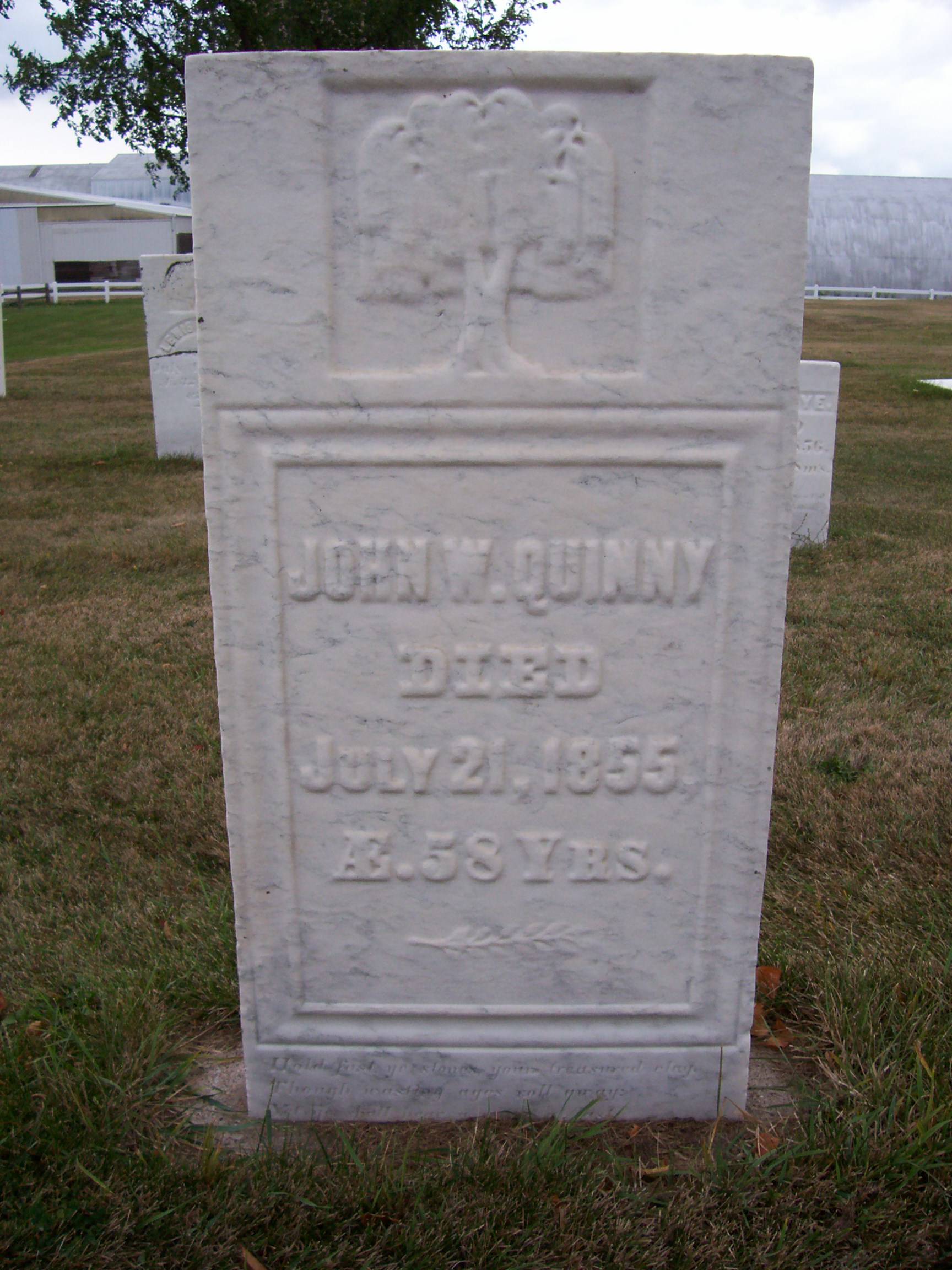
Grave site near Stockbridge, Wisconsin

John Wannuaucon Quinney (c. 1797 – July 21, 1855) was a Mahican (also Stockbridge) diplomat, and was also referred to as "The Dish", a translation of his middle name, this being "a symbolic term for the Mohican (sic) homelands along the Housatonic River".

== Biography ==
He was a native of the Hudson River Valley in Connecticut but lived in several different places, notably Norwich, Connecticut, Stockbridge, Massachusetts, and Oneida, Wisconsin. He promoted native rights and integration into modernity as well as arguing from the standpoint of a small northern native population.

== Representative ==
In 1822, Quinney was one of three agents who went to Green Bay, Wisconsin to purchase land for New York tribe members who wanted to resettle west into Wisconsin. They bought land from the Menominee Indians. Members moved west in one group per year until everyone was moved by 1829. In 1827, Menominee members met with United States Government officials to settle their boundary dispute. The Menominee ended up selling their land to the officials, including the land on the Fox River that they had sold to the Mahican. Quinney represented the Mahican in 1828 and 1830 by attempting to secure a title for the disputed land. The Menominee disowned their sale to the New York tribes. The Stockbridge and Munsee decided to negotiate a treaty with the United States government in 1831. The negotiations concluded in 1832 with these tribes securing two townships on the east shore of Lake Winnebago: Stockbridge, and Brothertown.

He drafted a constitution for the tribe in 1837, ratified by over half of the tribe, which gave up their governance by heredity. Some members of the tribe were reluctant to give up their traditional governance, resulting in conflict in the tribe. They decided to sell half of their land so that some members could move farther west. For the next five years, Quinney represented the tribe before the United States Congress in attempts to settle losses from the numerous relocations. In 1843, the United States Congress made the tribe members United States citizens. Quinney represented some members who wanted a return to tribal status. He helped negotiate an 1848 treaty that said that the tribe could move west if suitable land was found. This had not occurred by 1852, so he asked Congress to grant him title to his home in Stockbridge, Wisconsin since he was too old and frail. His request was granted in 1854 and he became a United States citizen. Quinney died while living at Stockbridge, Wisconsin on July 21, 1855. The next year a treaty was negotiated with the Menominee to purchase the land that resulted in the final solution of a Stockbridge-Munsee Community.

In Quinney's 1852 memorial to the United States Congress, he calls himself "a true Native American", which some scholars believe to be the first use of the term to describe the indigenous people of the Americas.

== Fourth of July Address at Reidsville, New York, 1854 ==
In this address, he states that as he has gotten older he has witnessed the increase of wealth and power of the Europeans while at the same time a decline of his tribe, he believes that their extinction is inevitable. Quinney also speaks of a prophet who foretold the coming of the palefaces. He states that at first there was an impression of astonishment and pity towards these white men which later turned to admiration for their superior intelligence. He states that promises were ruthlessly broken by the white man, even intentionally broken. He also claims the white man gave the Indians Small Pox and Measles along with other diseases to thin their ranks, in addition to promoting feuds amongst the tribes. He makes a claim that if a piece of land were left by a tribe for purposes of hunting, that land would be said to be abandoned and would be taken. He closes his speech by asking for justice for himself along with his tribe, exclaiming at the end, "may the Great Spirit enable me to die in hope."
