= Stockbridge (town), Wisconsin =

Stockbridge, Wisconsin
- Town
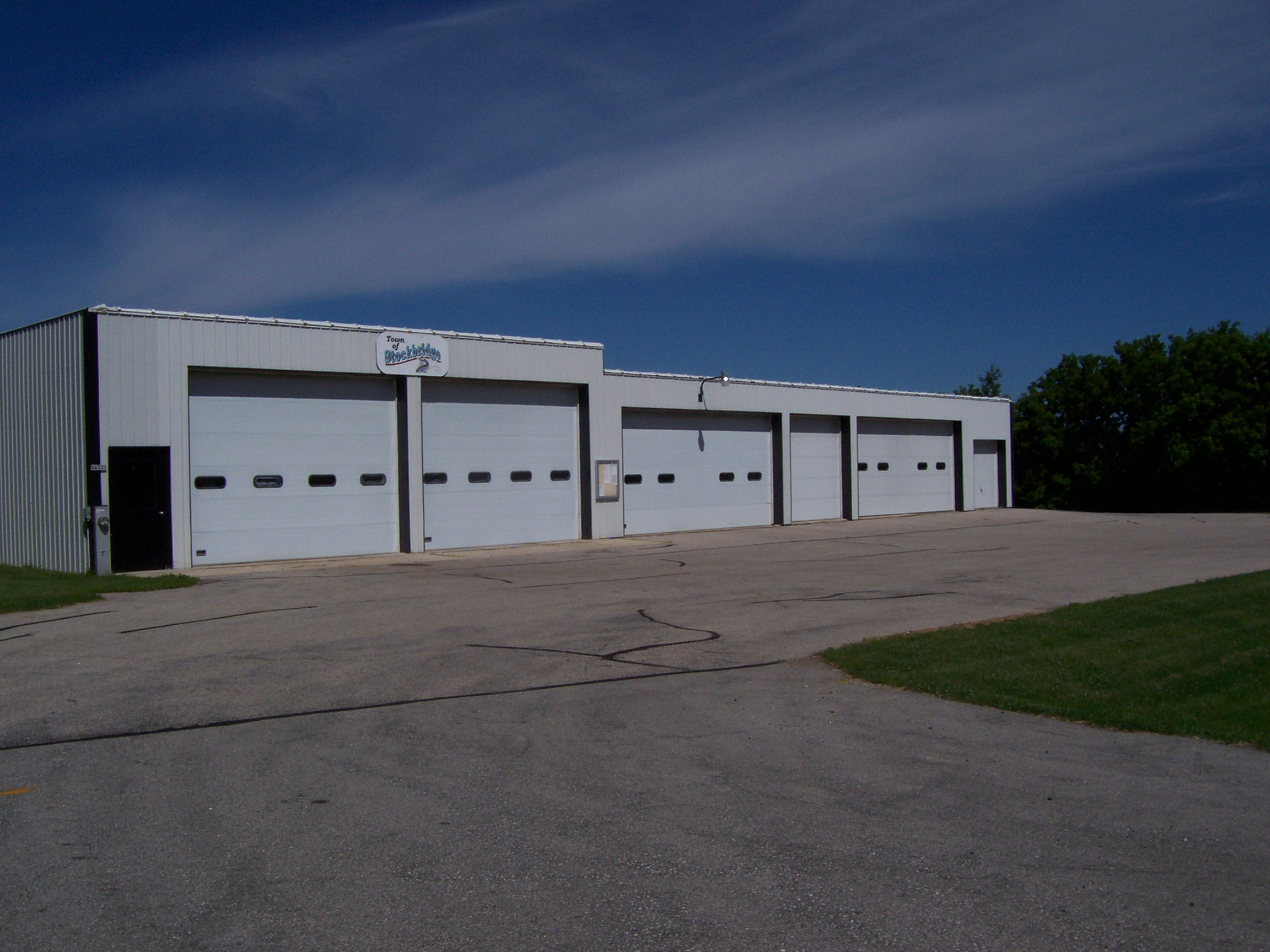
- Stockbridge Town Hall

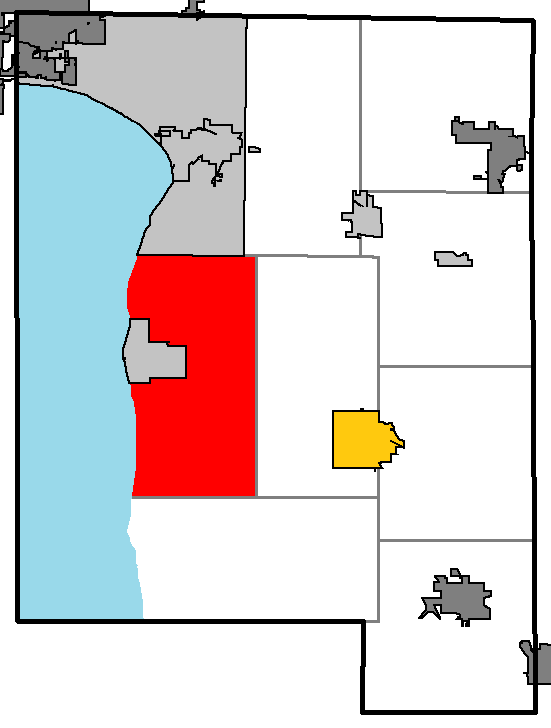
- Location of Stockbridge, within Calumet County
- Coordinates: 44°3′36″N 88°16′58″W
- Country: United States
- State: Wisconsin
- County: Calumet

Area
  - Total: 67.0 sq mi (173.4 km^{2})
  - Land: 33.6 sq mi (87.0 km^{2})
  - Water: 33.4 sq mi (86.4 km^{2})
- Elevation: 771 ft (235 m)

Population (2020)
  - Total: 1,453
  - Density: 43.3/sq mi (16.7/km^{2})
- Time zone: UTC-6 (Central (CST))
  - Summer (DST): UTC-5 (CDT)
- ZIP code: 53088
- Area code: 920
- FIPS code: 55-77425
- GNIS feature ID: 1584227
- Website: townofstockbridge.gov

Stockbridge is a town in Calumet County, Wisconsin. The population was 1,453 at the 2020 census, slightly down from 1,456 at the time of the 2010 census. The village of Stockbridge, and the unincorporated communities of Kloten, Quinney, and Saint Catherines Bay are located within the town.

== Geography ==
Stockbridge is in western Calumet County, on the eastern shore of Lake Winnebago. The village of Stockbridge is slightly north of the center of the town. According to the United States Census Bureau, the town has a total area of 67.0 square miles (173.4 km^{2}), of which 33.6 square miles (87.0 km^{2}) is land and 33.4 square miles (86.4 km^{2}), or 49.84%, is water.

== Demographics ==
As of the census of 2000, there were 1,383 people, 506 households, and 392 families residing in the town. The population density was 41.1 people per square mile (15.9/km^{2}). There were 614 housing units at an average density of 18.3 per square mile (7.1/km^{2}). The racial makeup of the town was 97.18% White, 0.36% Black or African American, 0.65% Native American, 0.80% Asian, 0.07% Pacific Islander, 0.14% from other races, and 0.80% from two or more races. 1.08% of the population were Hispanic or Latino of any race.

There were 506 households, out of which 33.8% had children under the age of 18 living with them, 70.0% were married couples living together, 2.8% had a female householder with no husband present, and 22.5% were non-families. 18.6% of all households were made up of individuals, and 7.9% had someone living alone who was 65 years of age or older. The average household size was 2.73 and the average family size was 3.12.

In the town, the population was spread out, with 25.7% under the age of 18, 7.0% from 18 to 24, 27.3% from 25 to 44, 27.0% from 45 to 64, and 13.0% who were 65 years of age or older. The median age was 40 years. For every 100 females, there were 110.5 males. For every 100 females age 18 and over, there were 114.6 males.

The median income for a household in the town was $55,096, and the median income for a family was $57,768. Males had a median income of $36,447 versus $27,350 for females. The per capita income for the town was $22,392. About 1.7% of families and 2.4% of the population were below the poverty line, including none of those under age 18 and 7.3% of those age 65 or over.

== Notable people ==
- William Reader, member of the Wisconsin State Assembly
- Ty Bodden, member of the Wisconsin State Assembly
