= List of gentlemen's clubs in the United States =

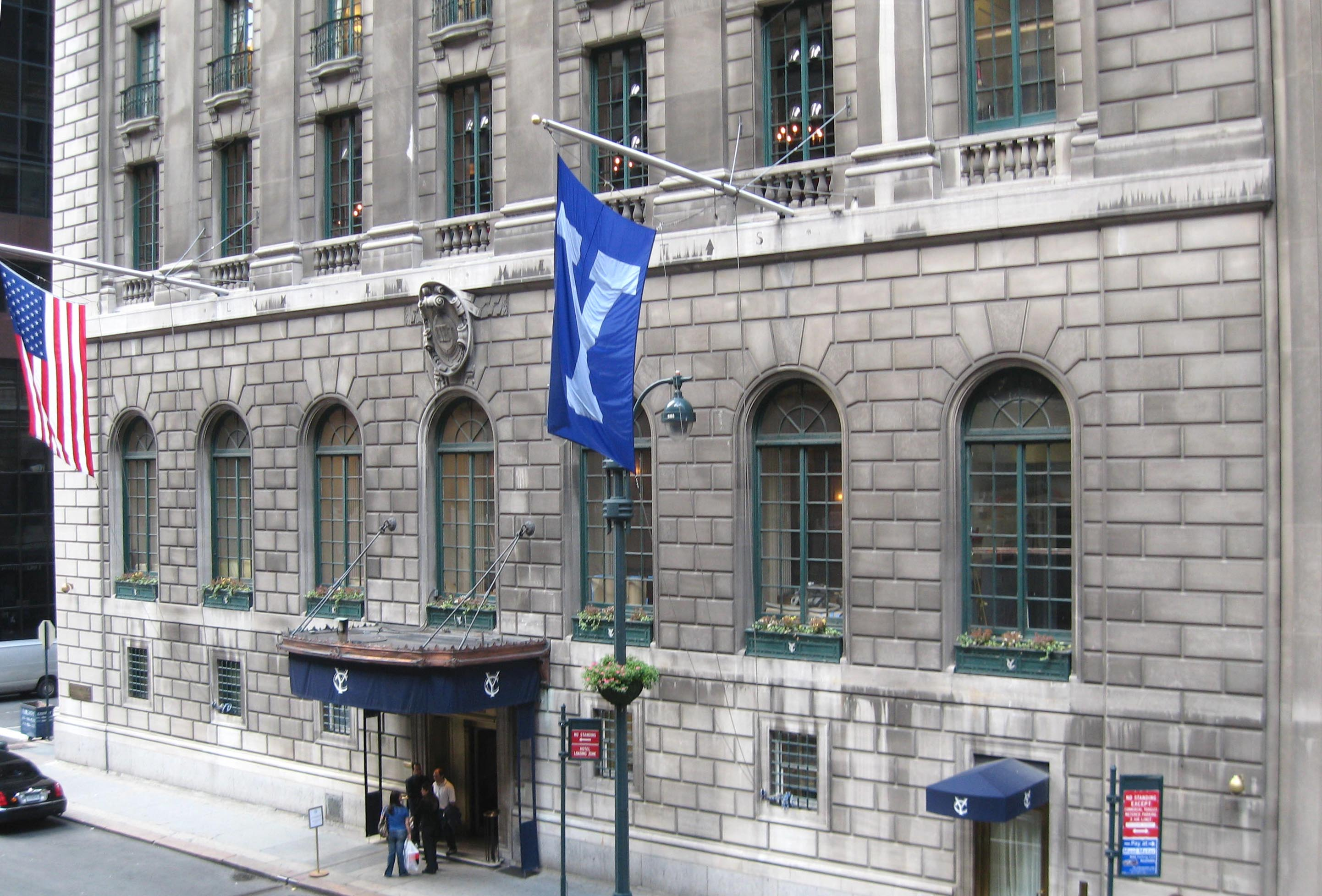
The Yale Club of New York City, founded in 1897, the world's largest gentlemen's club

The following is a list of notable traditional gentlemen's clubs in the United States. For those that have closed, see the List of defunct gentlemen's clubs in the United States.

Historically, these clubs were exclusively for men, but most now admit women.

== On exclusivity and assimilation into the upper class ==
Christopher Doob explains in his book Social Inequality and Social Stratification in U.S. Society:

The most exclusive social clubs are in the oldest cities – Boston, New York City, Philadelphia, and Washington D.C. Others, which are well respected, have developed in such major cities as Pittsburgh, Chicago, and San Francisco. The most exclusive social clubs are two in New York City – the Links and the Knickerbocker (Allen 1987, 25). Personal wealth has never been the sole basis for attaining membership in exclusive clubs. The individual and family must meet the admissions committee's standards for values and behavior. Old money prevails over new money as the Rockefeller family experience suggests. John D. Rockefeller, the family founder and the nation's first billionaire, joined the Union League Club, a fairly respectable but not top-level club; John D. Rockefeller, Jr., belonged to the University Club, a step up from his father; and finally his son John D. Rockefeller, III, reached the pinnacle with his acceptance into the Knickerbocker Club (Baltzell 1989, 340).

E. Digby Baltzell, sociologist of the WASP establishment, explains in his book Philadelphia Gentlemen: The Making of a National Upper Class:

The circulation of elites in America and the assimilation of new men of power and influence into the upper class takes place primarily through the medium of urban clubdom. Aristocracy of birth is replaced by an aristocracy of ballot. Frederick Lewis Allen showed how this process operated in the case of the nine "Lords of Creation" who were listed in the New York Social Register as of 1905: 'The nine men who were listed [in the Social Register] were recorded as belonging to 9.4 clubs apiece,' wrote Allen. 'Though only two of them, J. P. Morgan and Cornelius Vanderbilt III, belonged to the Knickerbocker Club, the citadel of Patrician families (indeed, both already belonged to old prominent families at the time), Stillman and Harriman joined these two in the membership of the almost equally fashionable Union Club; Baker joined these four in the membership of the Metropolitan Club of New York (magnificent, but easier of access to new wealth); John D. Rockefeller, William Rockefeller, and Rogers, along with Morgan and Baker were listed as members of the Union League Club (the stronghold of Republican respectability); seven of the group belonged to the New York Yacht Club. Morgan belonged to nineteen clubs in all; Vanderbilt, to fifteen; Harriman, to fourteen.' Allen then goes on to show how the descendants of these financial giants were assimilated into the upper class: 'By way of footnote, it may be added that although in that year [1905] only two of our ten financiers belonged to the Knickerbocker Club, in 1933 the grandsons of six of them did. The following progress is characteristic: John D. Rockefeller, Union League Club; John D. Rockefeller, Jr., University Club; John D. Rockefeller 3rd, Knickerbocker Club. Thus is the American aristocracy recruited.'

== History ==
The traditional gentlemen's club originated in London (in particular the St James's area) in the 18th century as a successor to coffeehouses. These clubs also continue to operate in the United States. The five oldest existing American clubs are the South River Club in South River, Maryland (c.1690/1700), the Schuylkill Fishing Company in Andalusia, Pennsylvania (1732), the Old Colony Club in Plymouth, Massachusetts (1769), the Philadelphia Club in Philadelphia (1834), and the Union Club of the City of New York in New York City (1836). The Boston Club, of New Orleans, named after the card game and not the city, is the oldest southern club, founded in 1841. The five oldest existing clubs west of the Mississippi River are the Pacific Club in Honolulu (1851), the Pacific-Union Club (1852), Olympic Club (1860), and Concordia-Argonaut Club (1864), all in San Francisco, and the Arlington Club in Portland, Oregon (1867).

== Present day ==
While most major American cities today have at least one gentlemen's club, they are most prevalent in older cities, especially those on the East Coast. As detailed below, only thirteen American cities have five or more such clubs: Atlanta, Boston, Chicago, Cincinnati, Denver, Detroit, Los Angeles, New Orleans, New York City, Philadelphia, Pittsburgh, San Francisco, Seattle, and Washington, D.C. Also as detailed below, New York City contains more than any other American city, including the Yale Club of New York City, the largest traditional gentlemen's club in the world. Throughout the country, though, many clubs have reciprocal relationships with the older clubs in London, with each other, and with other gentlemen's clubs around the world.

A few American gentlemen's clubs maintain separate "city" and "country" clubhouses, essentially functioning as both a traditional gentlemen's club in one location and a country club in another: the Piedmont Driving Club in Atlanta, the Wisconsin Club in Milwaukee, the New York Athletic Club in New York City, the Union League of Philadelphia, the Missouri Athletic Club in St. Louis, and the Olympic Club in San Francisco. Similarly, the Jonathan Club in Los Angeles functions as a traditional gentlemen's club in one location and a beach club in another.

Because the term "gentlemen's club" is commonly used in the United States to refer euphemistically to strip clubs, traditional gentlemen's clubs often are referred to as "men's clubs" or "city clubs" (as opposed to country clubs) or simply as "private social clubs" or just "private clubs". For other meanings and nuances of the word "club", see club.

== Clubs currently operating ==
=== Alabama ===
- Birmingham
  - The Club (1951)
- Mobile
  - The Athelstan Club (1875)
- Tuscaloosa
  - The University Club of the University of Alabama (1944)

=== Alaska ===
- Anchorage
  - The Petroleum Club of Anchorage (1958)

=== Arizona ===
- Tempe
  - The University Club at Arizona State University (1989)
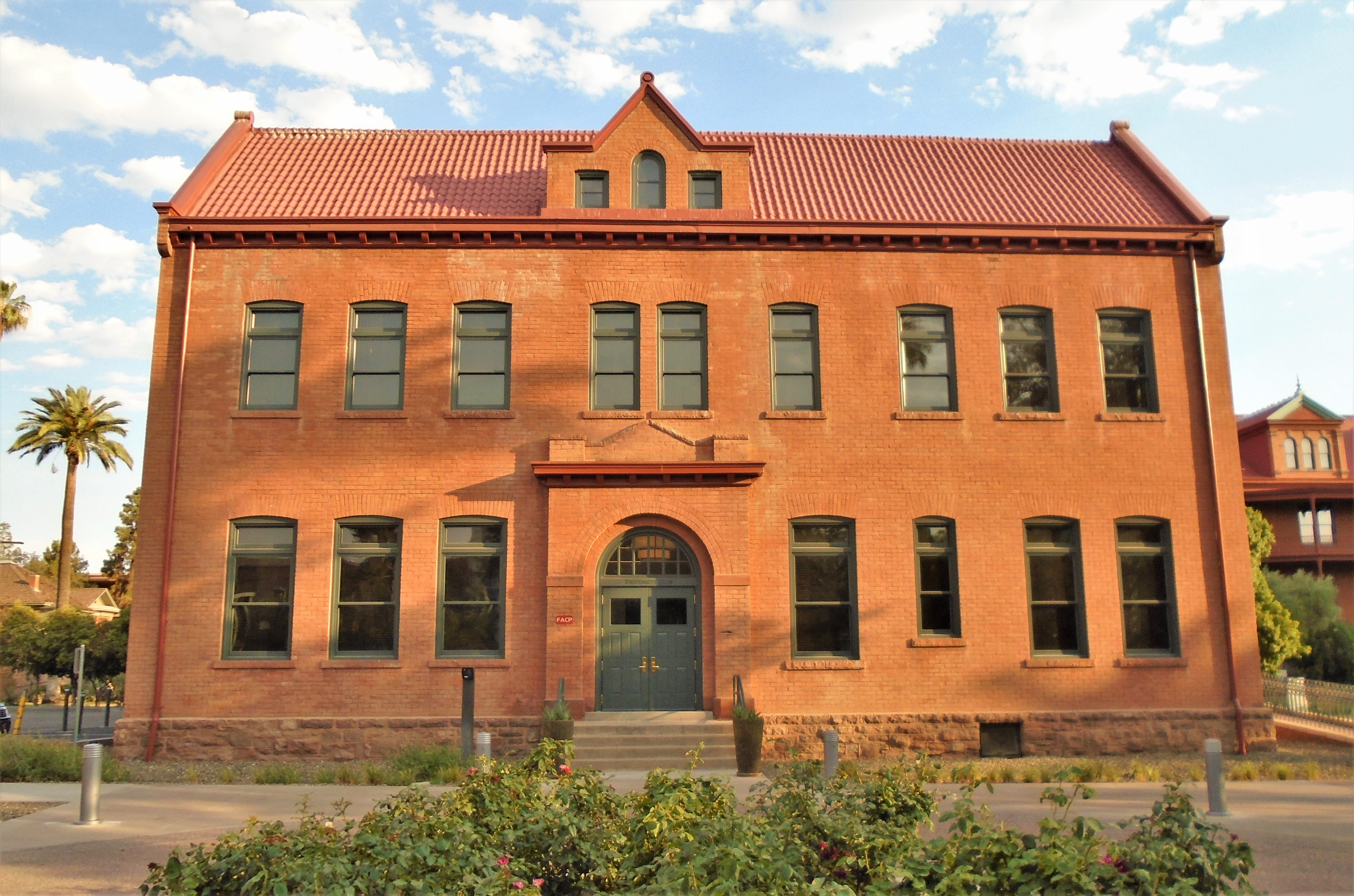
The University Club of Arizona State University
- Tucson
  - The Mountain Oyster Club (1948)

=== California ===
- Bakersfield
  - The Petroleum Club of Bakersfield (1952)
- Berkeley
  - The Berkeley City Club (1927)
  - The Berkeley Faculty Club (1902)
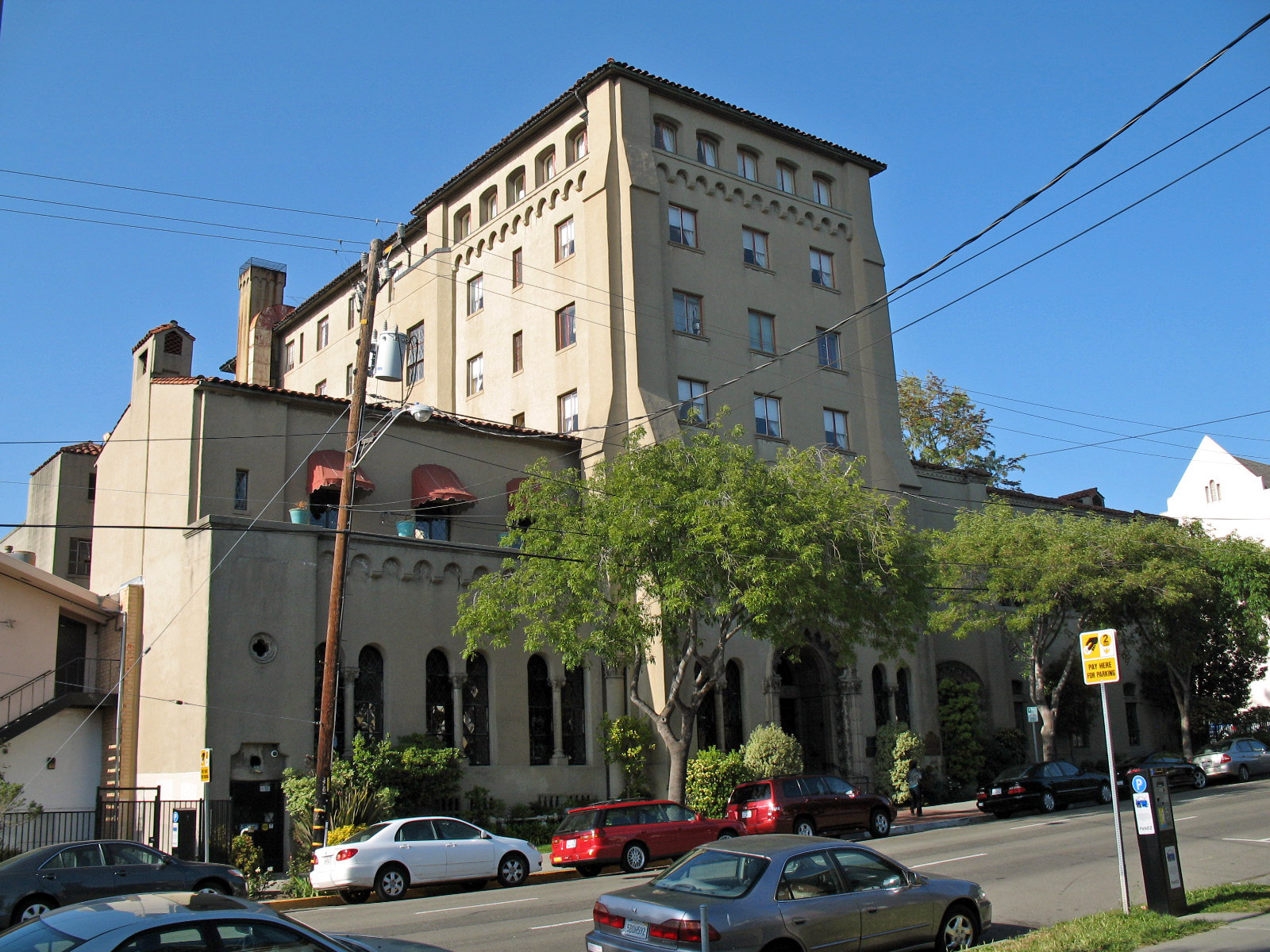
The Berkeley City Club

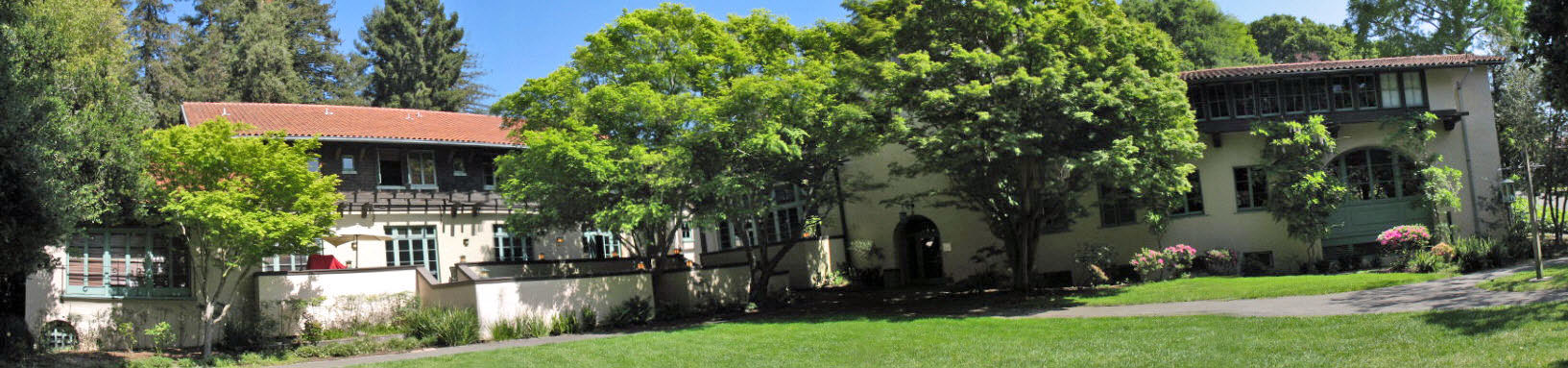
The Berkeley Faculty Club
- Eureka
  - The Ingomar Club (1950)
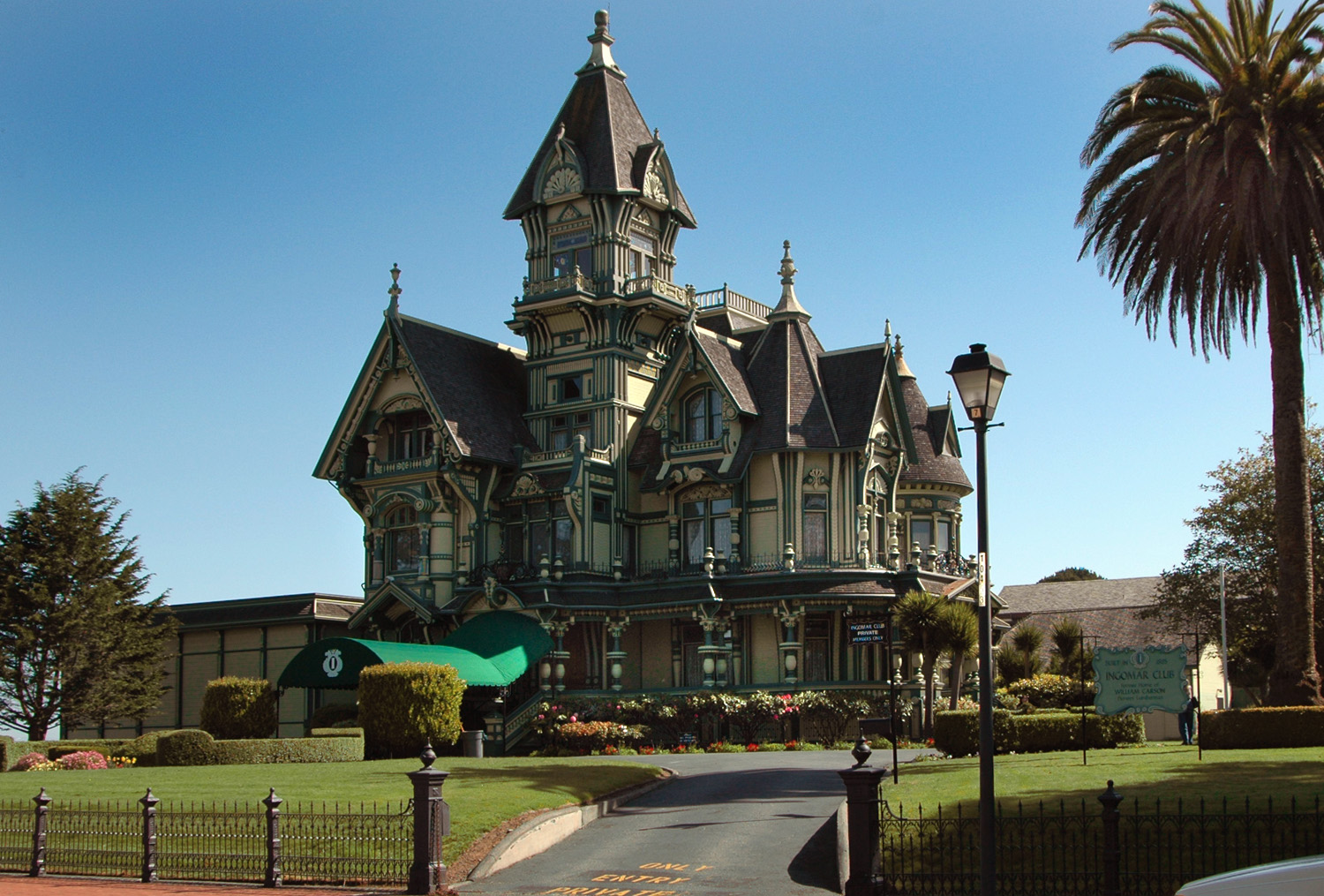
The Ingomar Club
- Los Angeles
  - The Academy of Magical Arts (1952)
  - The California Club (1887)
  - The Jonathan Club (1895)
  - The Los Angeles Athletic Club (1880)
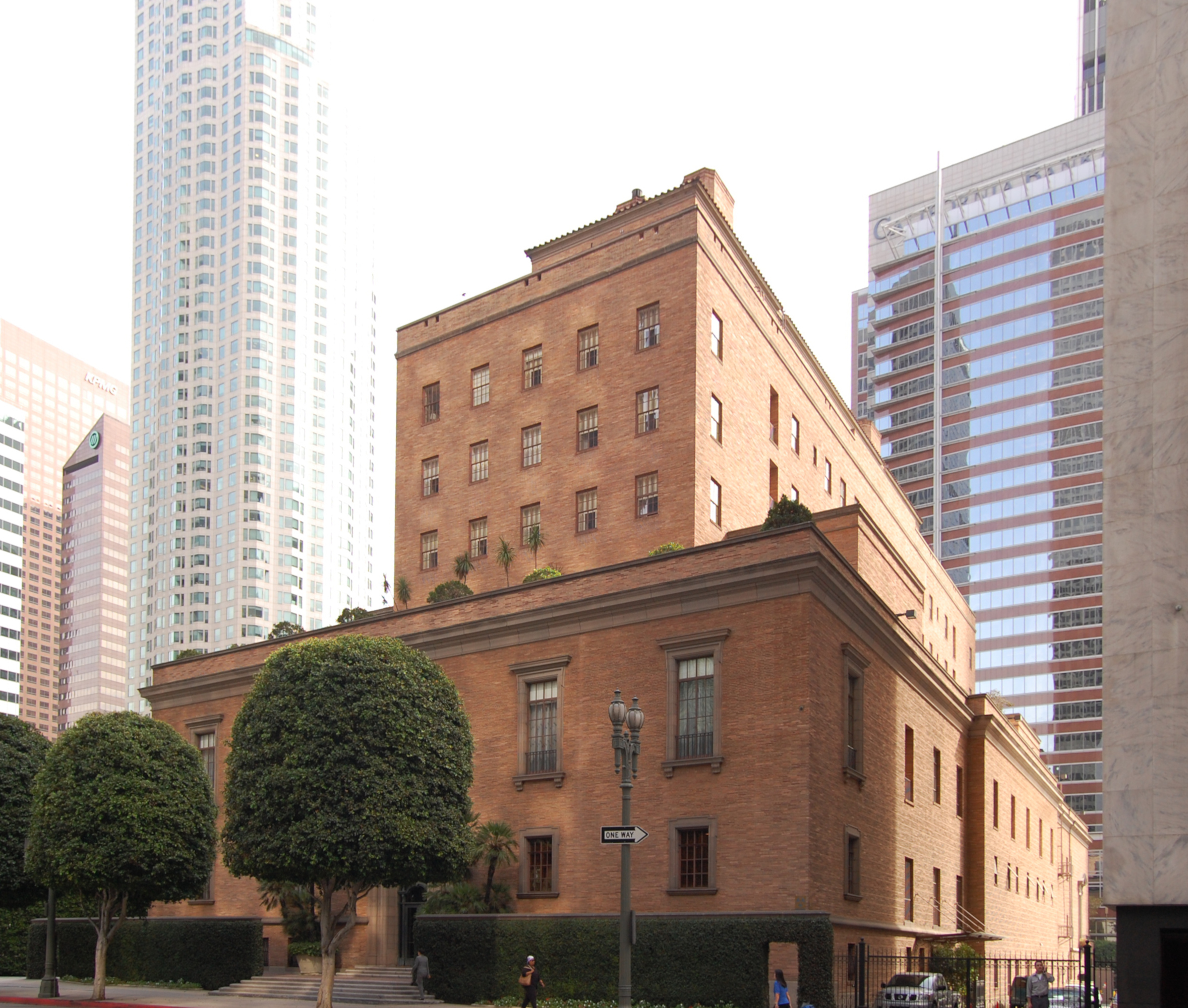
The California Club
- Modesto
  - Old Fisherman's Club
- Monterey
  - Pacheco Club (1957)
- Newport Beach
  - The Pacific Club (1981), which presents the Lott Trophy
- Oakland
  - The Bellevue Club (1929) (Never a gentlemen's club, it was exclusively for women until 1973)
- Palo Alto
  - The Stanford Faculty Club (1908)
  - The University Club of Palo Alto (1952)
- Pasadena
  - The Athenaeum at Caltech (1930)
  - The University Club of Pasadena (1922)
- Sacramento
  - The Sutter Club (1889)
- San Diego
  - The Faculty Club (1975)
  - The University Club of San Diego (1896)
- San Francisco
  - The Bohemian Club (1872), which hosts the Bohemian Grove retreat
  - The Cercle de l'Union ("the French Club") (1905)
  - The City Club of San Francisco (1930), until 1987 called the Pacific Stock Exchange Lunch Club
  - The Concordia-Argonaut Club (1864)
  - The Family (1901), founded by members of the Bohemian Club who left in a dispute
  - The Marines Memorial Club (1946)
  - The Norwegian Club of San Francisco (1898) (women first became full members in 2020)
  - The Olympic Club (1860)
  - The Pacific-Union Club (1852)
  - The University Club of San Francisco (1890)
  - The Villa Taverna (1960)
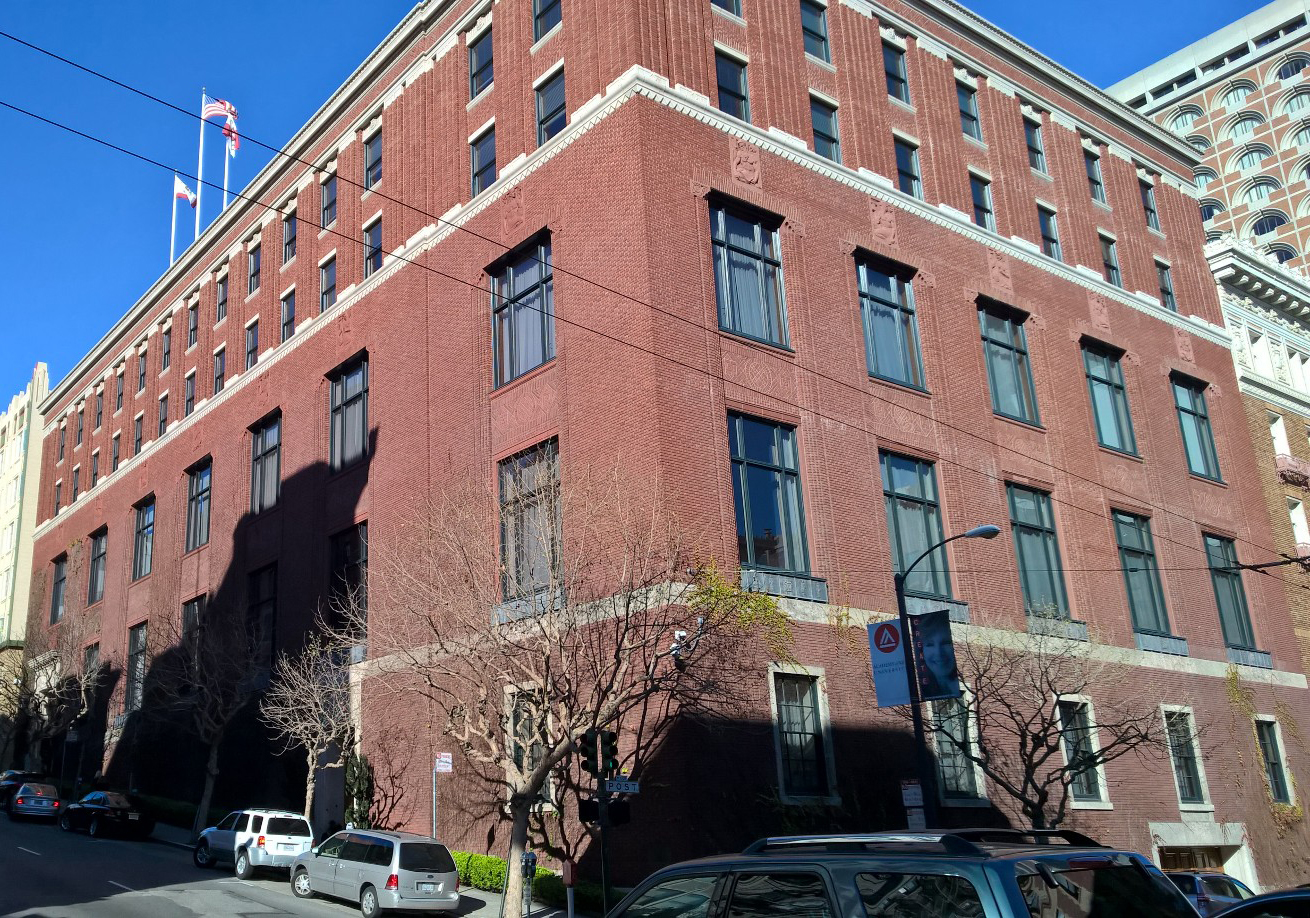
The Bohemian Club

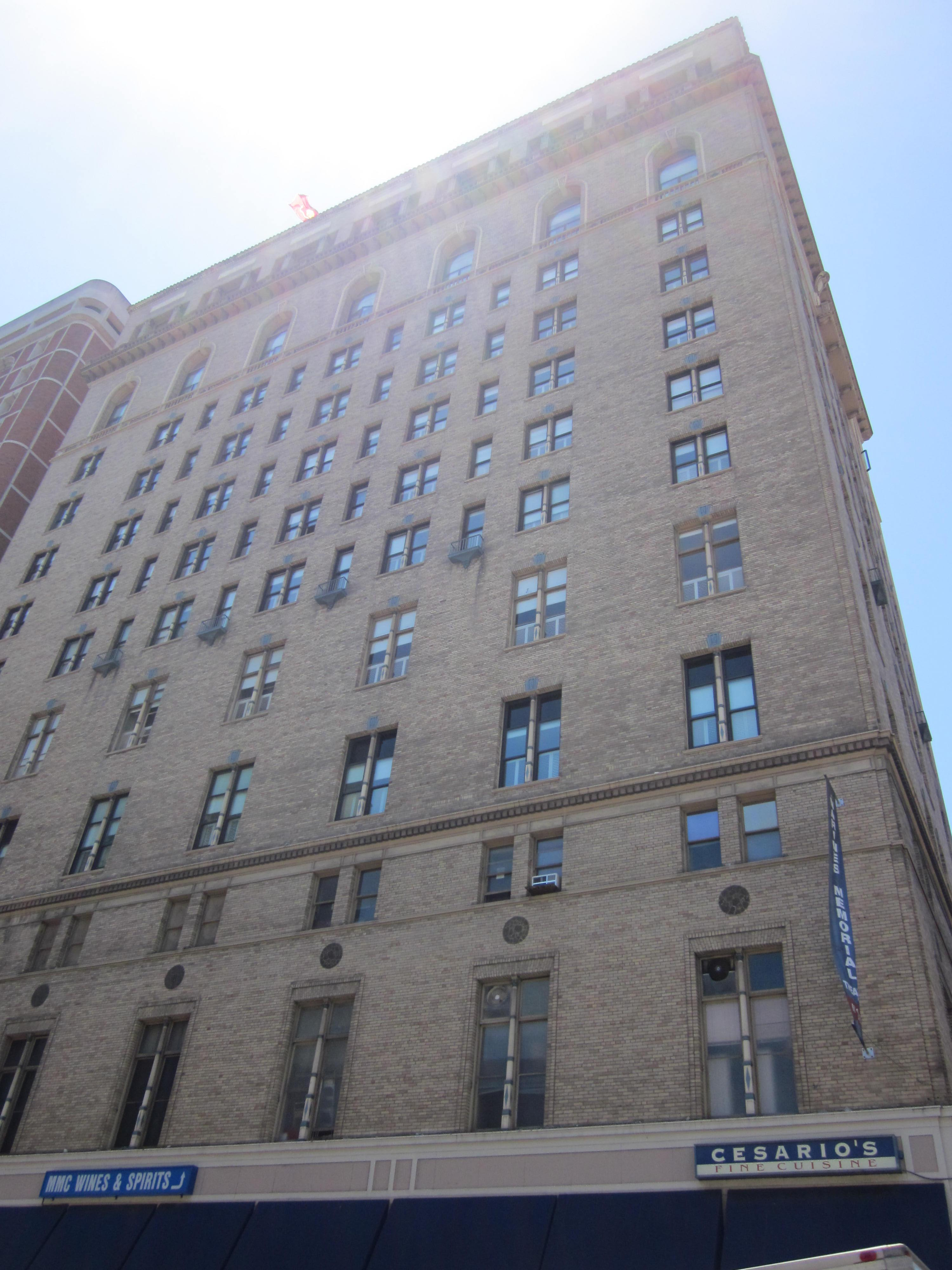
The Marines Memorial Club

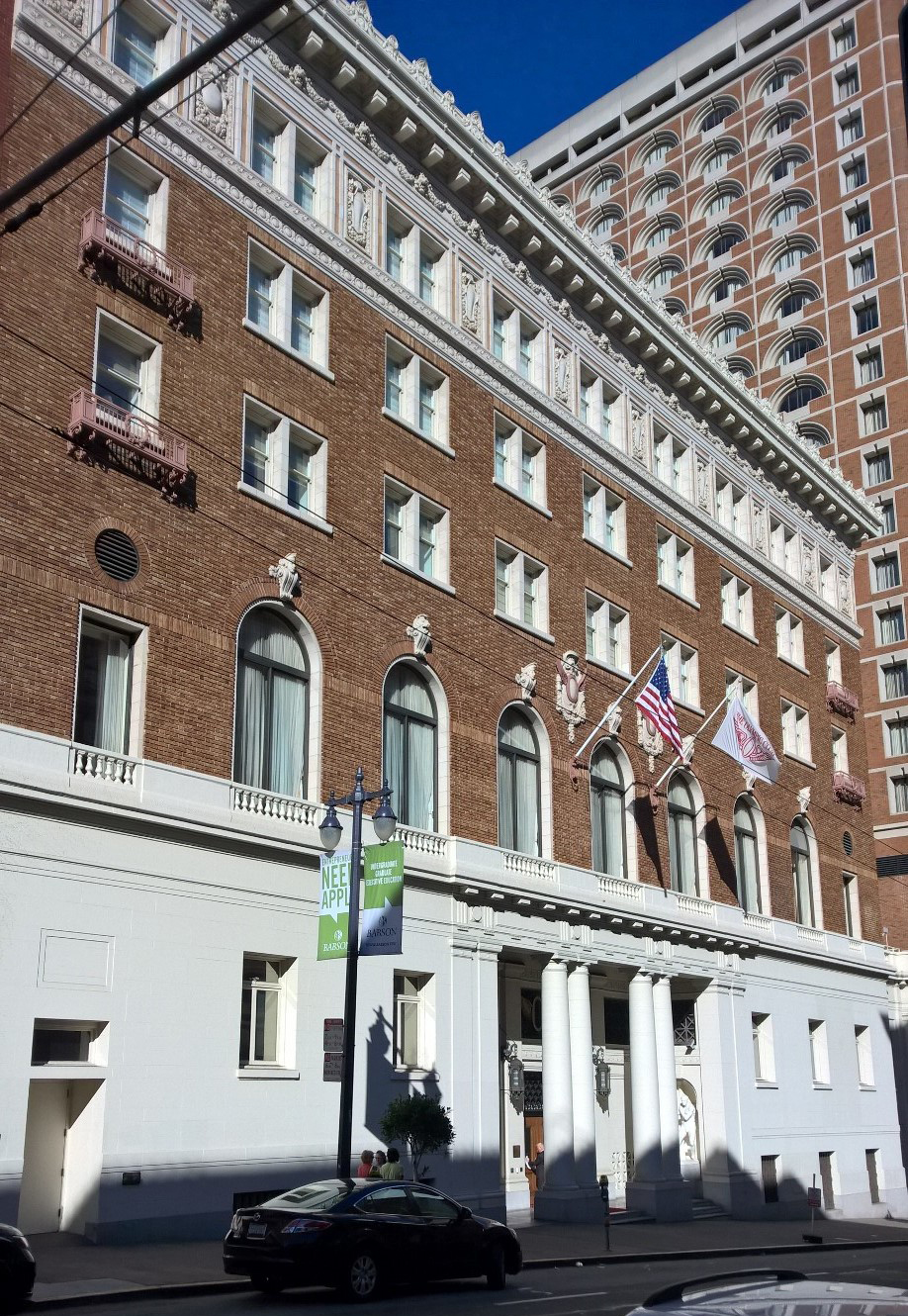
The Olympic Club

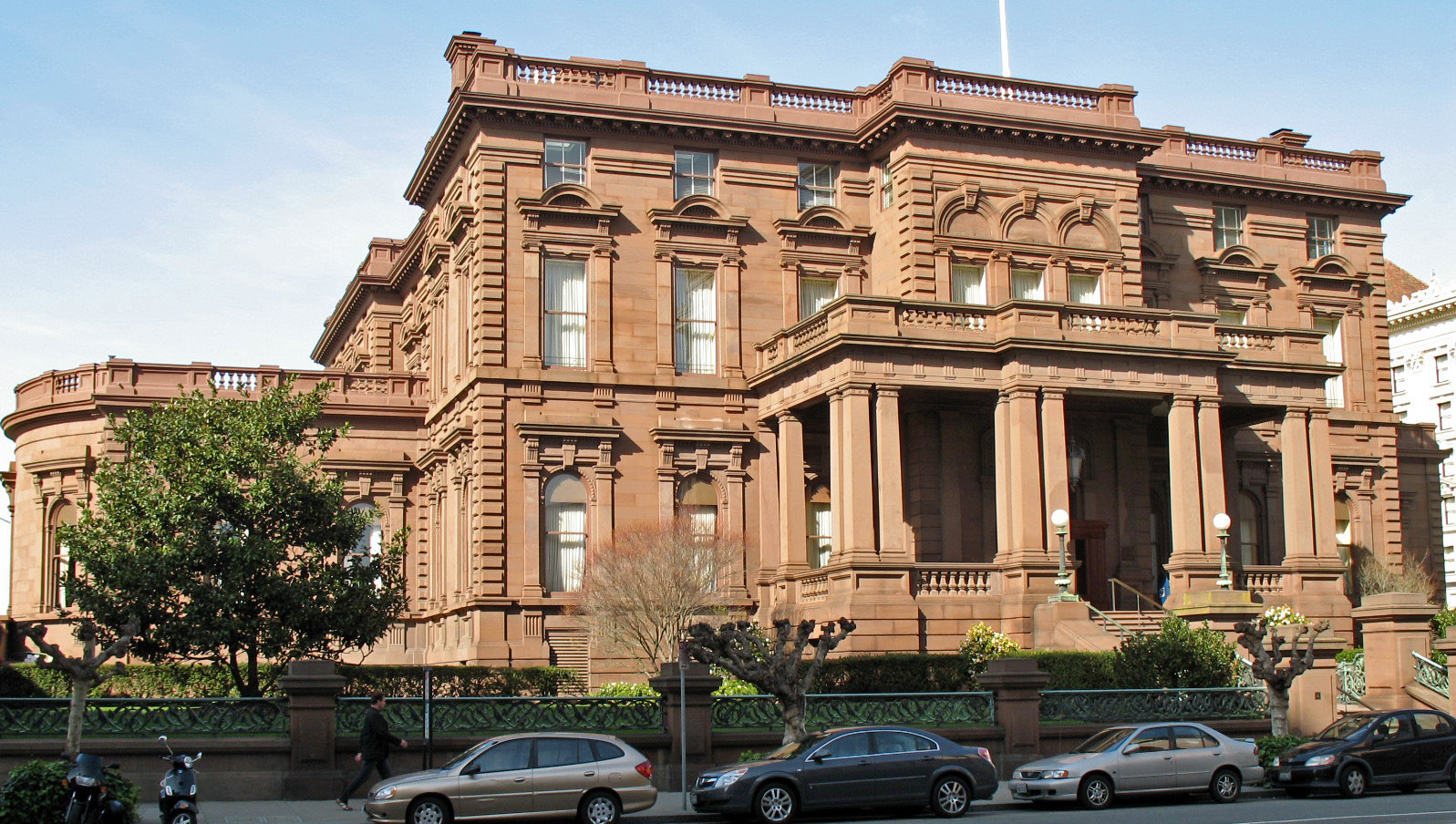
The Pacific-Union Club

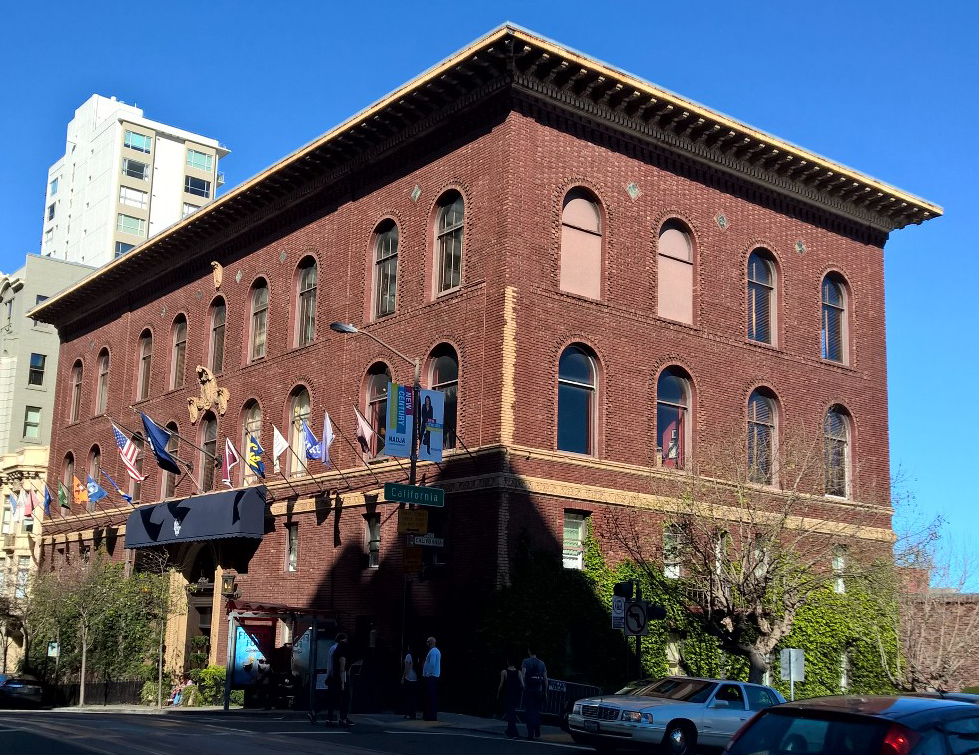
The University Club of San Francisco
- San Jose
  - The Sainte Claire Club (1888)
  - The Silicon Valley Athletic Club (1981), until 2012 called the San Jose Athletic Club
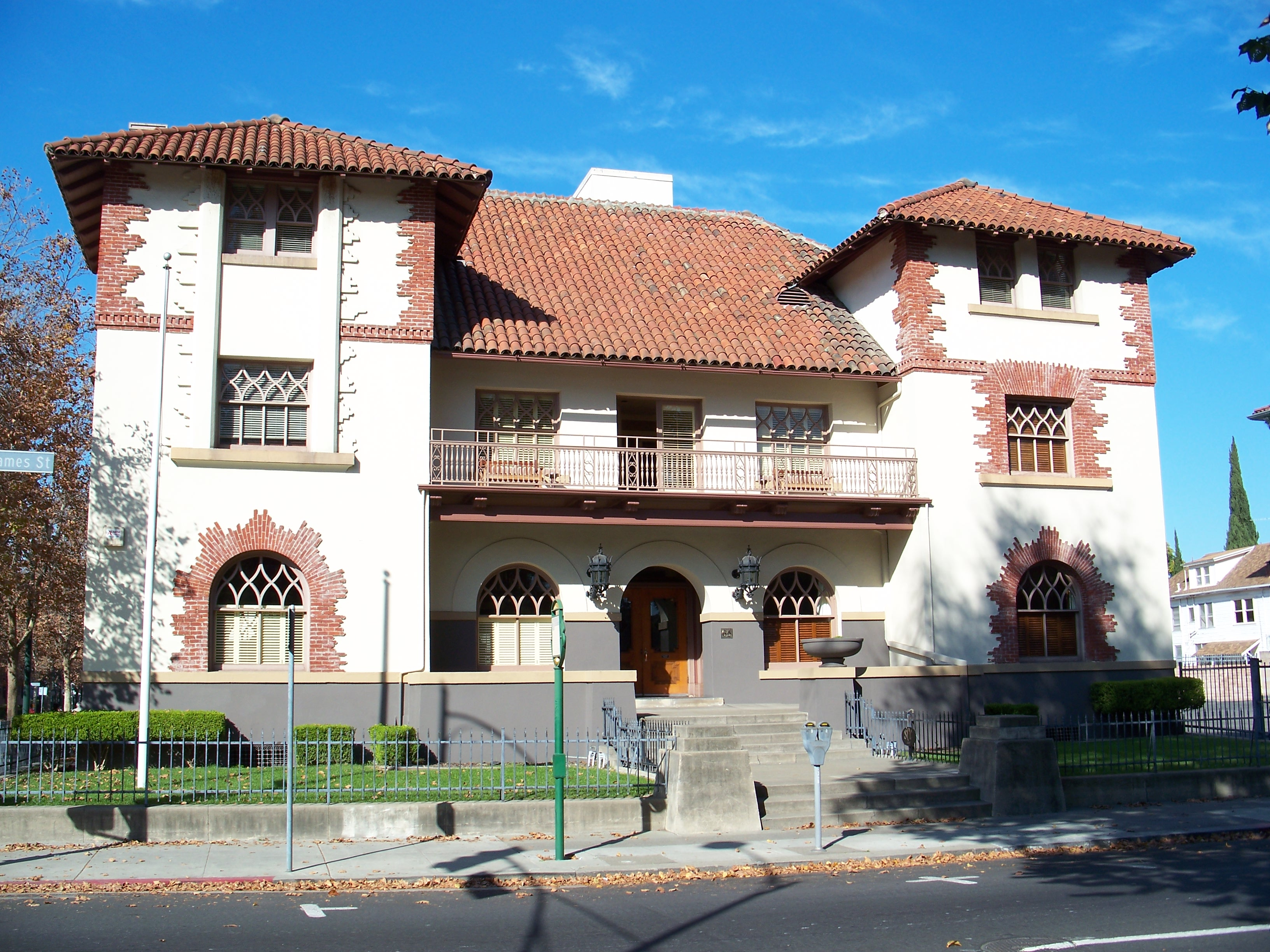
The Sainte Claire Club
- Santa Barbara
  - The Faculty Club (1963)
  - The Santa Barbara Club (1892)
  - The University Club of Santa Barbara (1923)
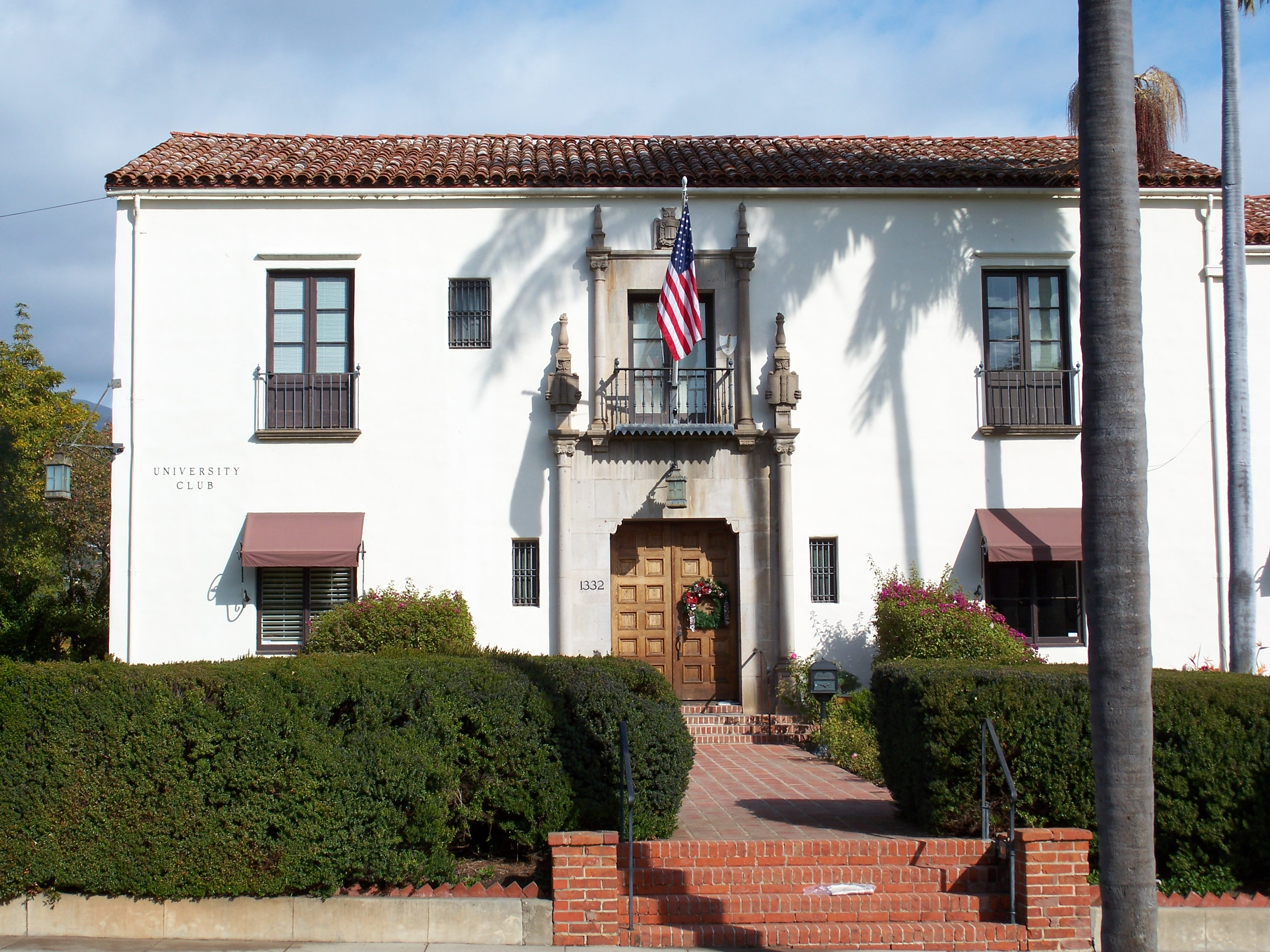
The University Club of Santa Barbara

=== Colorado ===
- Colorado Springs
  - The El Paso Club (1877)
- Denver
  - The Cactus Club (1911)
  - The Denver Athletic Club (1884)
  - The Denver Petroleum Club (1948)
  - The Denver Press Club (1877), the oldest existing press club in the United States
  - The University Club of Denver (1891)
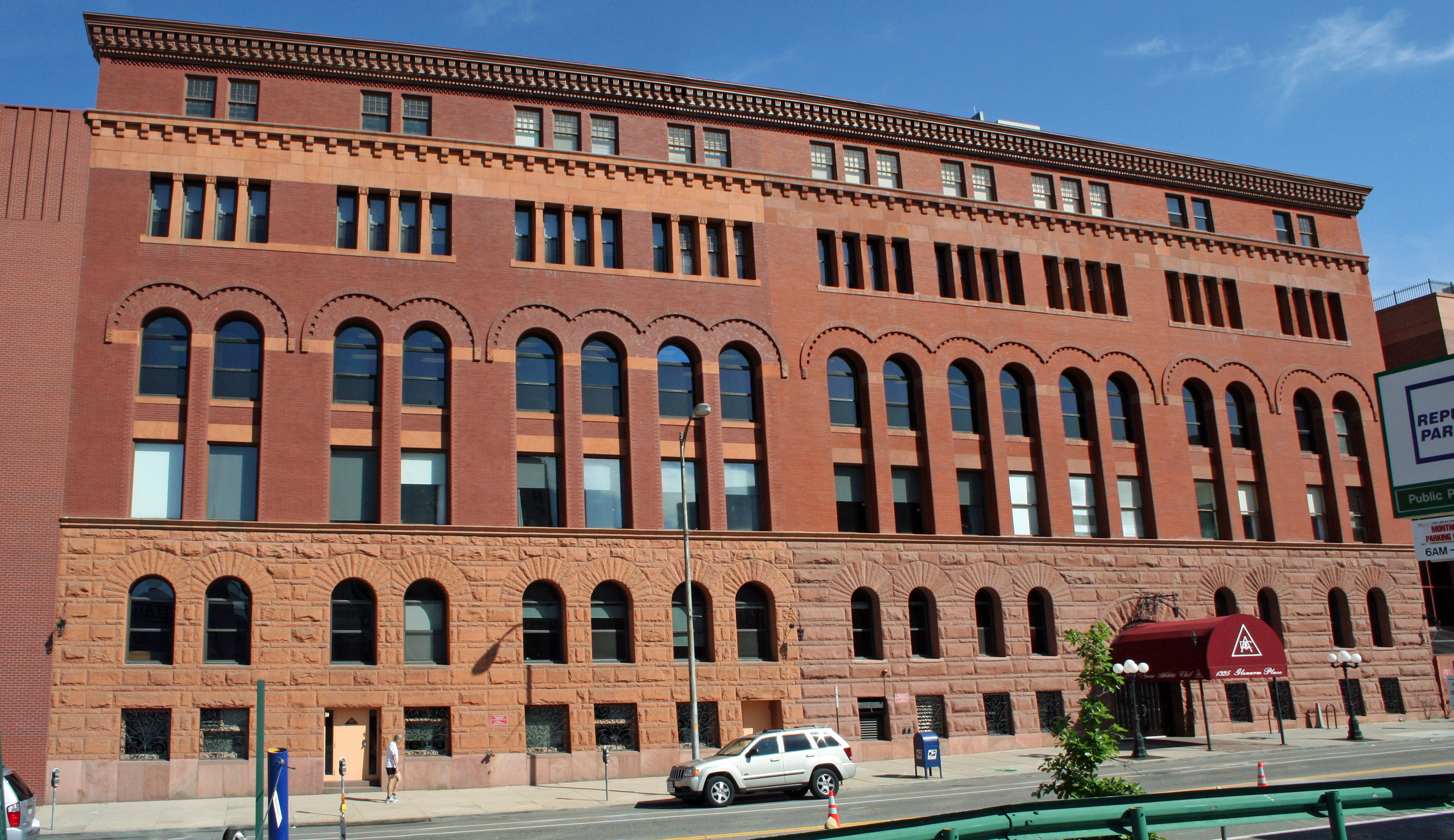
The Denver Athletic Club

=== Connecticut ===
- Greenwich
  - The Field Club (1908)
- Hartford
  - The Hartford Club (1873)
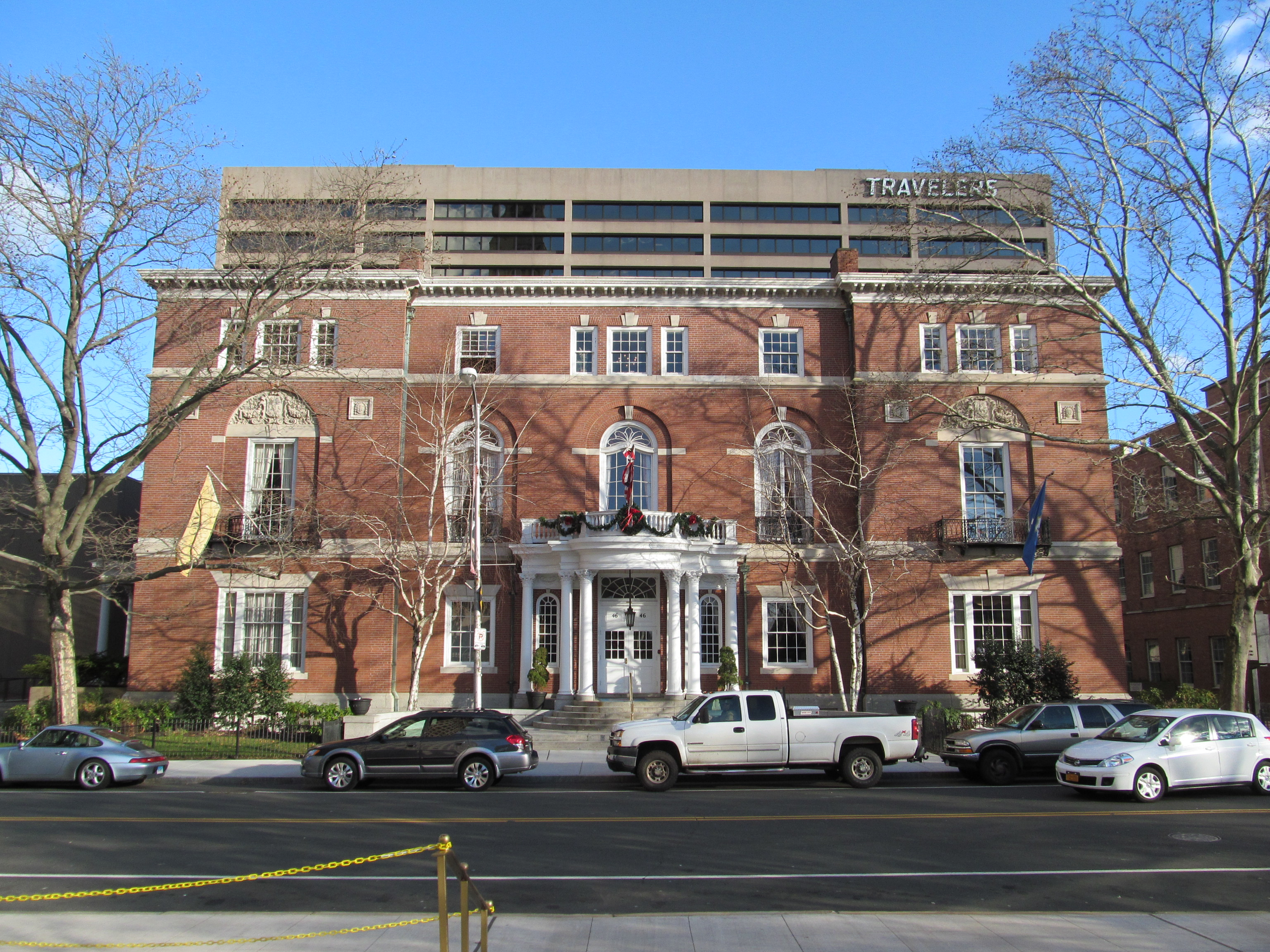
The Hartford Club
- New Haven
  - The Elm City Club (1892)
  - Mory's Association (1849)
  - The New Haven Lawn Club (1891)
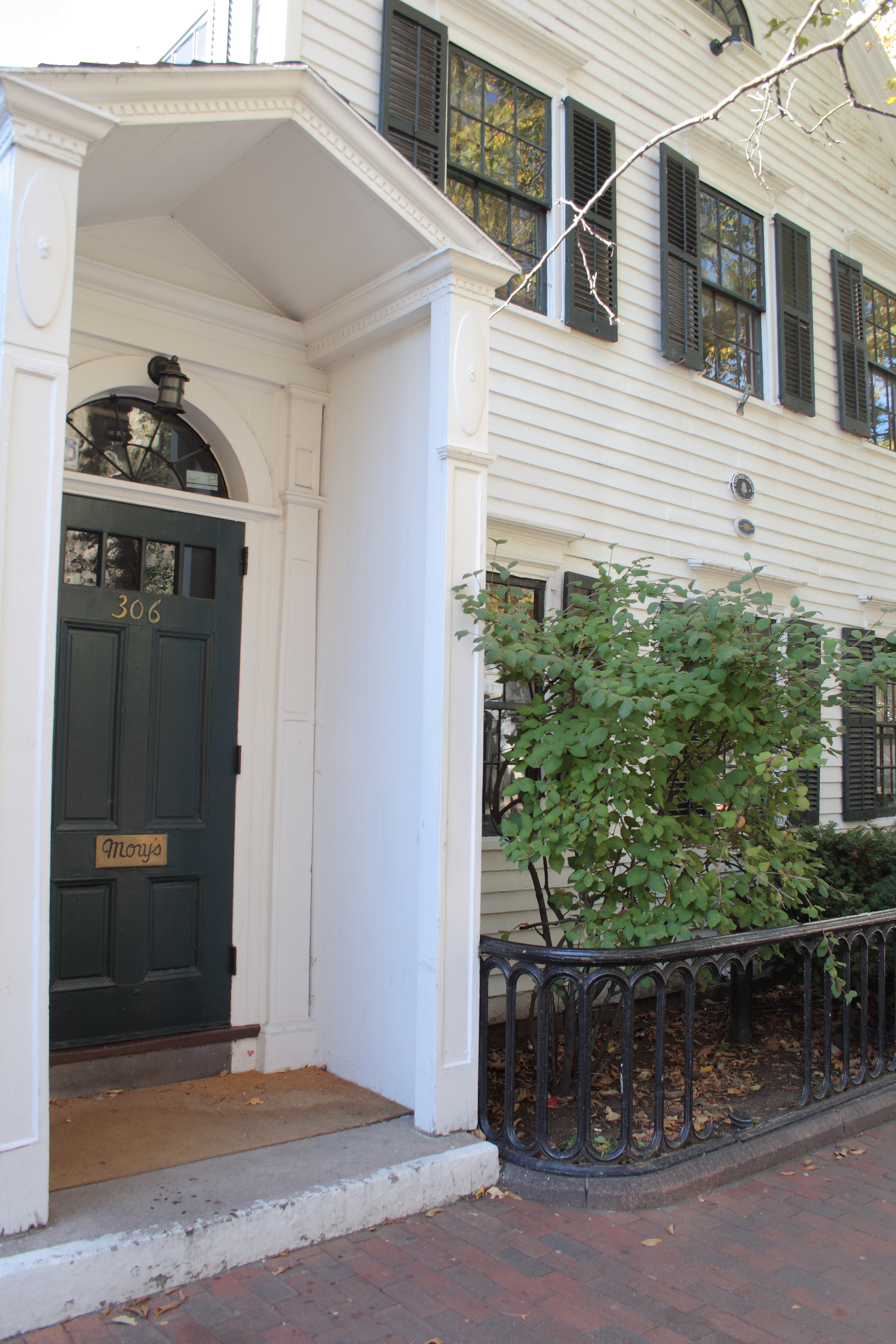
Mory's Association
- New London
  - The Thames Club (1869)

=== Delaware ===
- Wilmington
  - The Wilmington Club (1855)
  - The University and Whist Club (1891)
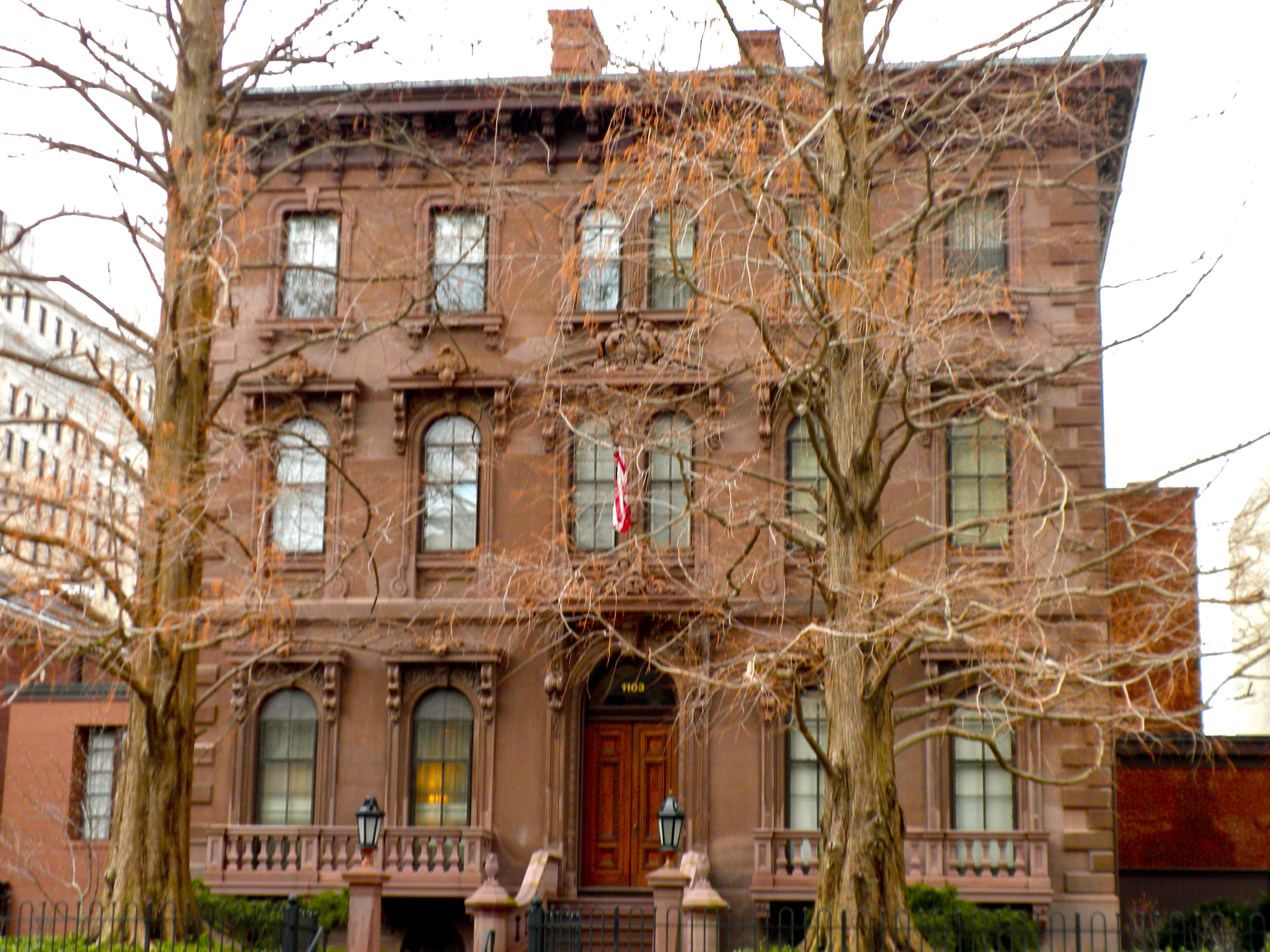
The Wilmington Club

=== District of Columbia ===
- Washington
  - The Alibi Club (1884)
  - The Army and Navy Club (1885)
  - The Arts Club of Washington (1916)
  - The Capitol Hill Club (The National Republican Club) (1951)
  - The Cosmos Club (1878)
  - The George Town Club (1966)
  - The Metropolitan Club (1863)
  - The National Press Club (1908)
  - The Sulgrave Club (1922)
  - The University Club of Washington, DC (1904)
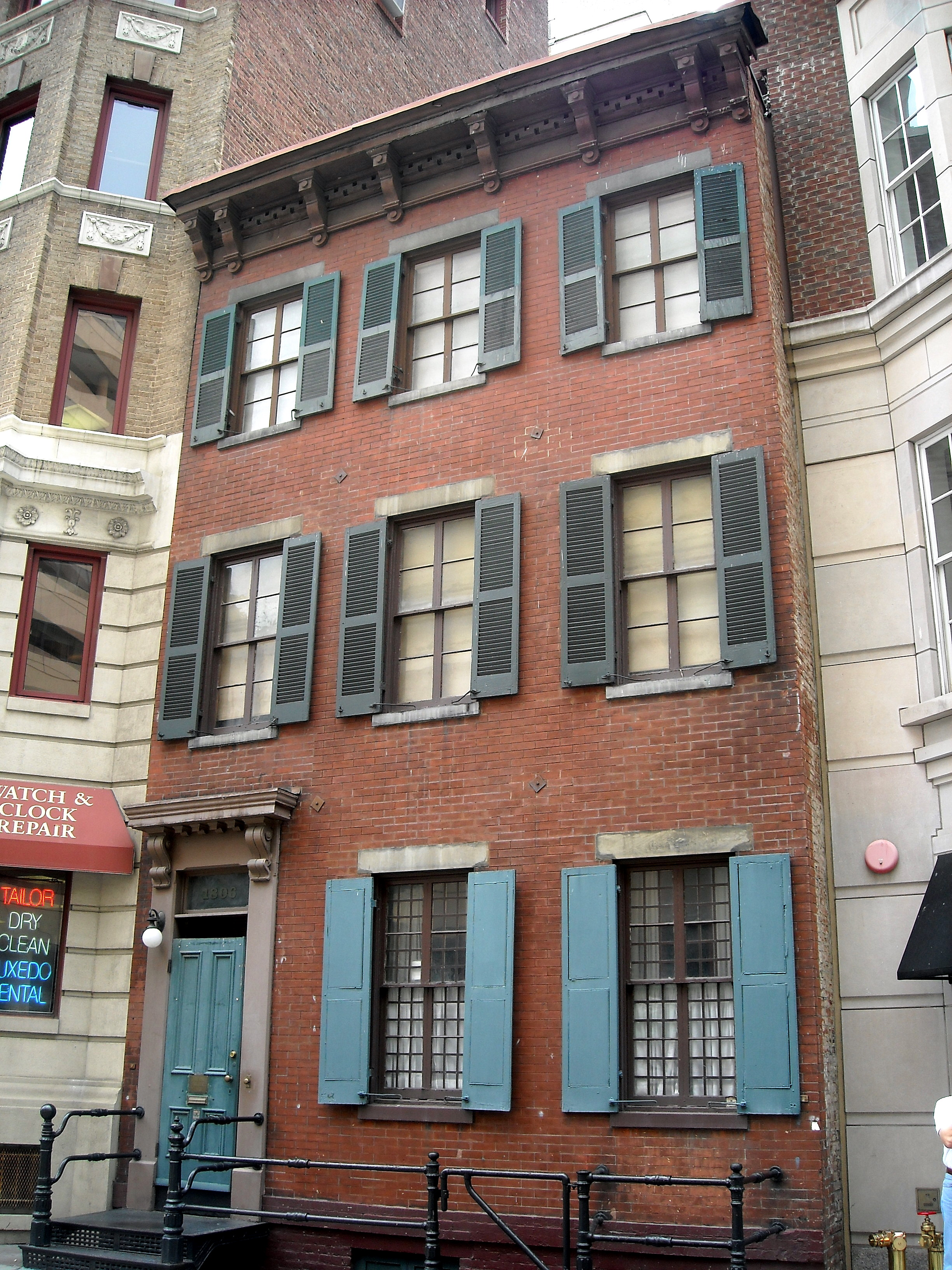
The Alibi Club

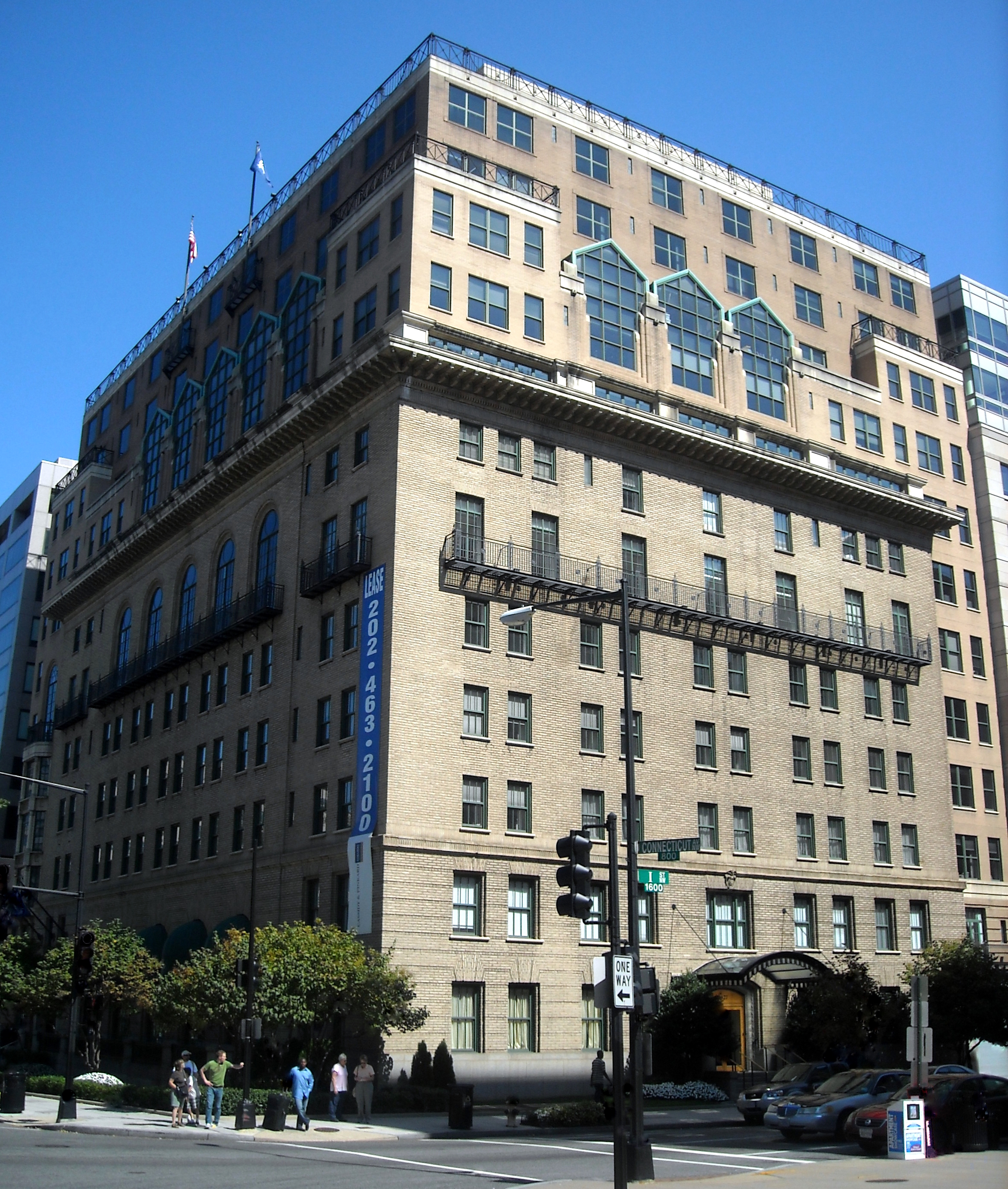
The Army and Navy Club

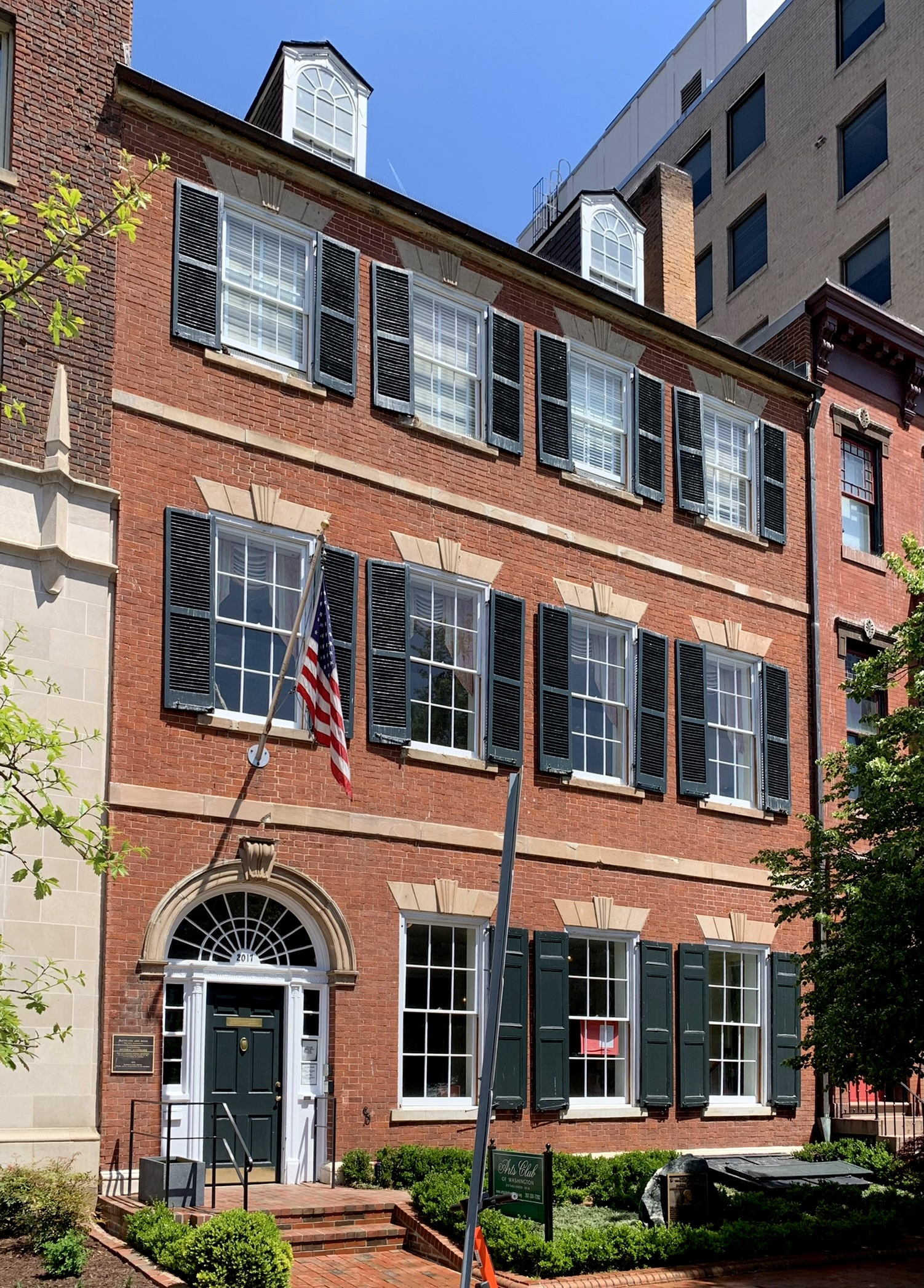
The Arts Club of Washington

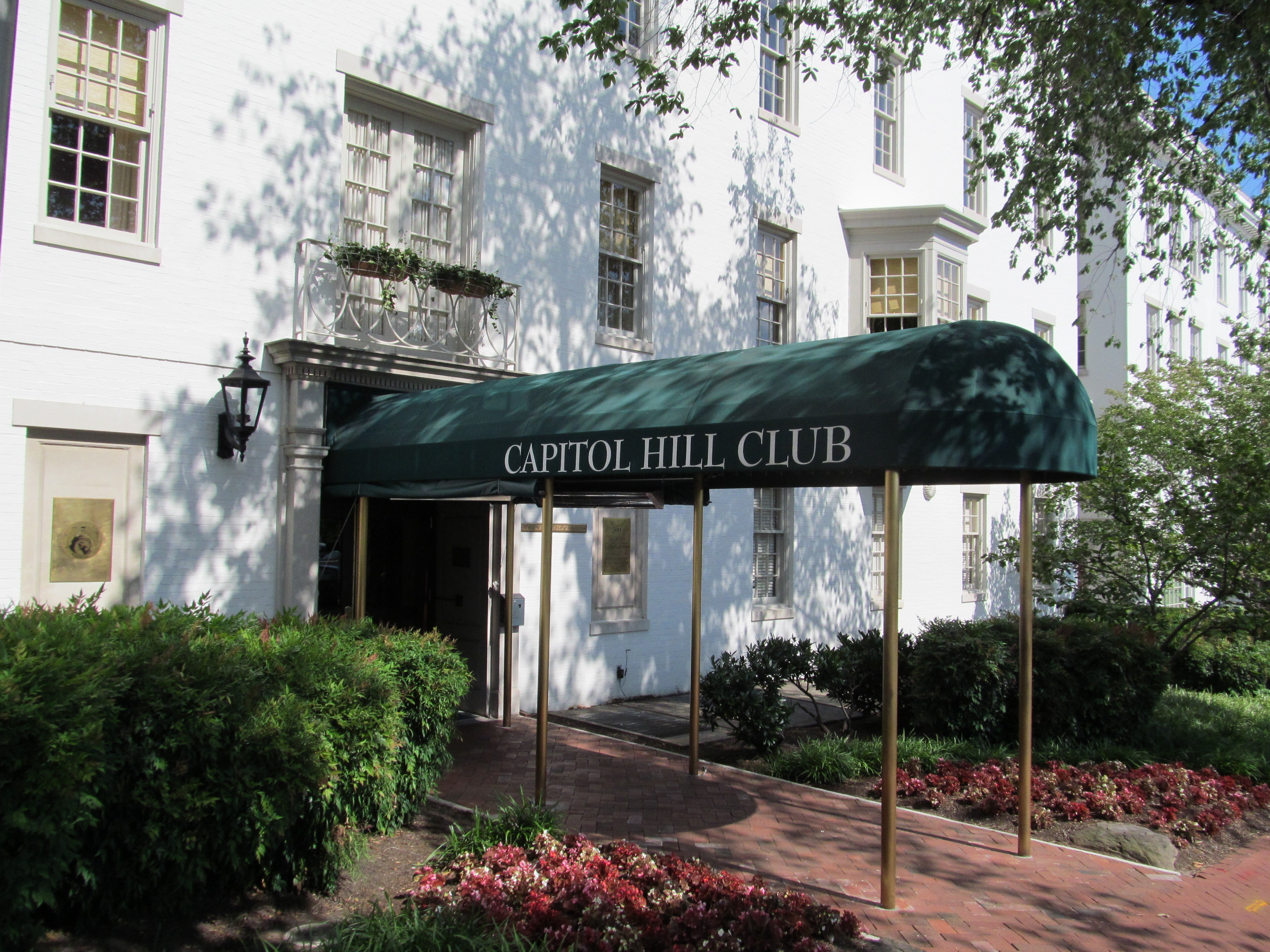
The Capitol Hill Club

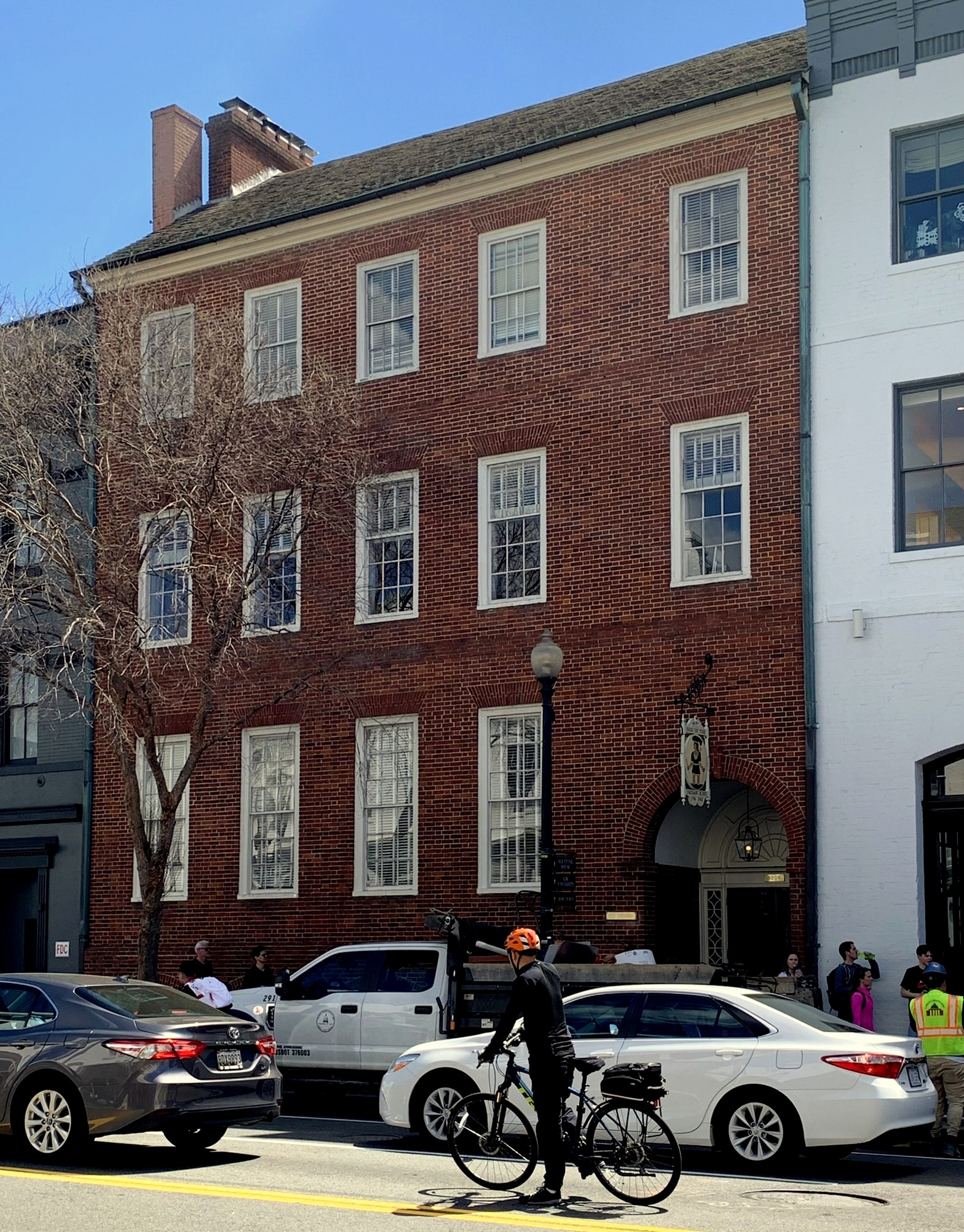
The City Tavern Club

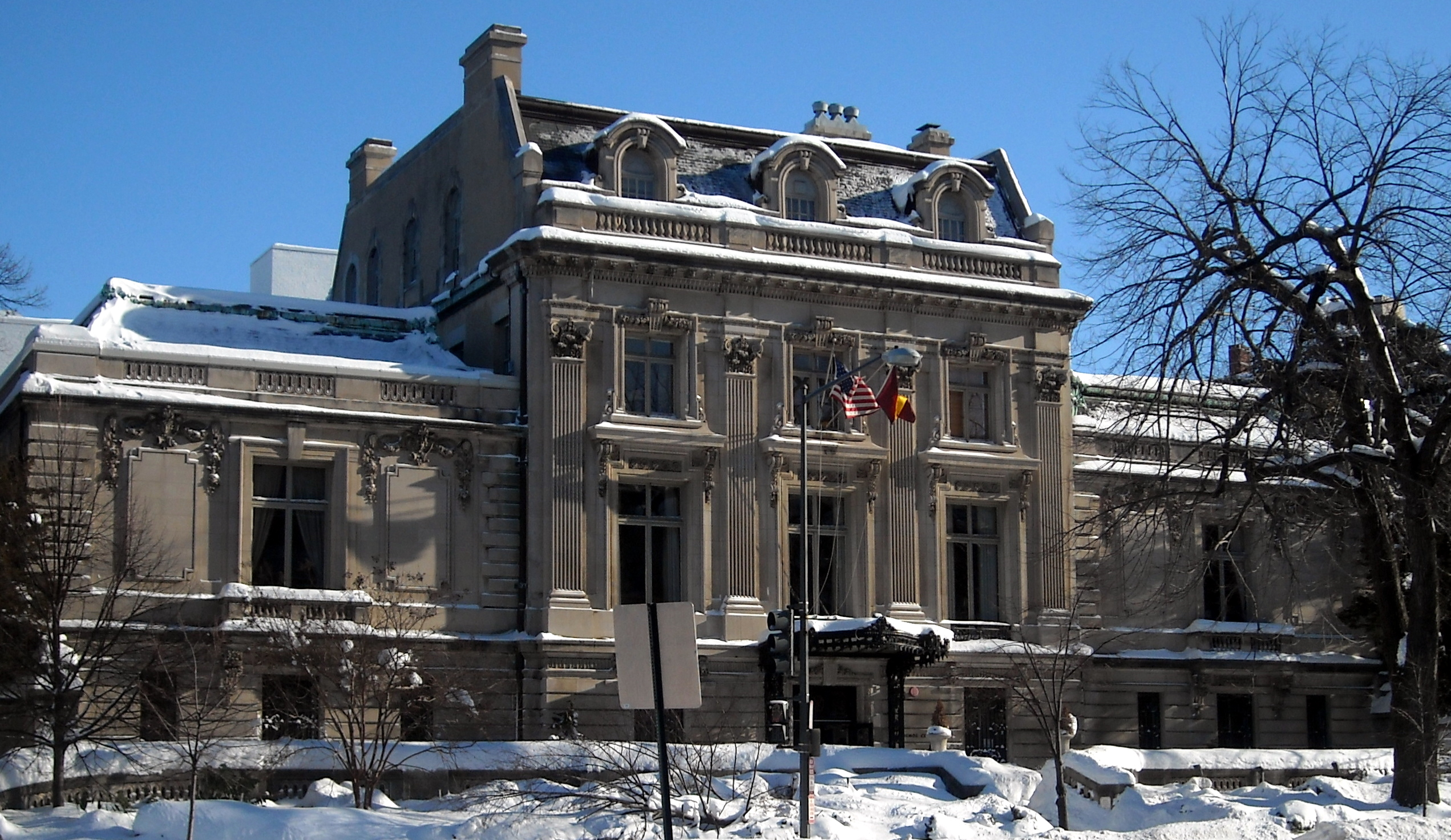
The Cosmos Club

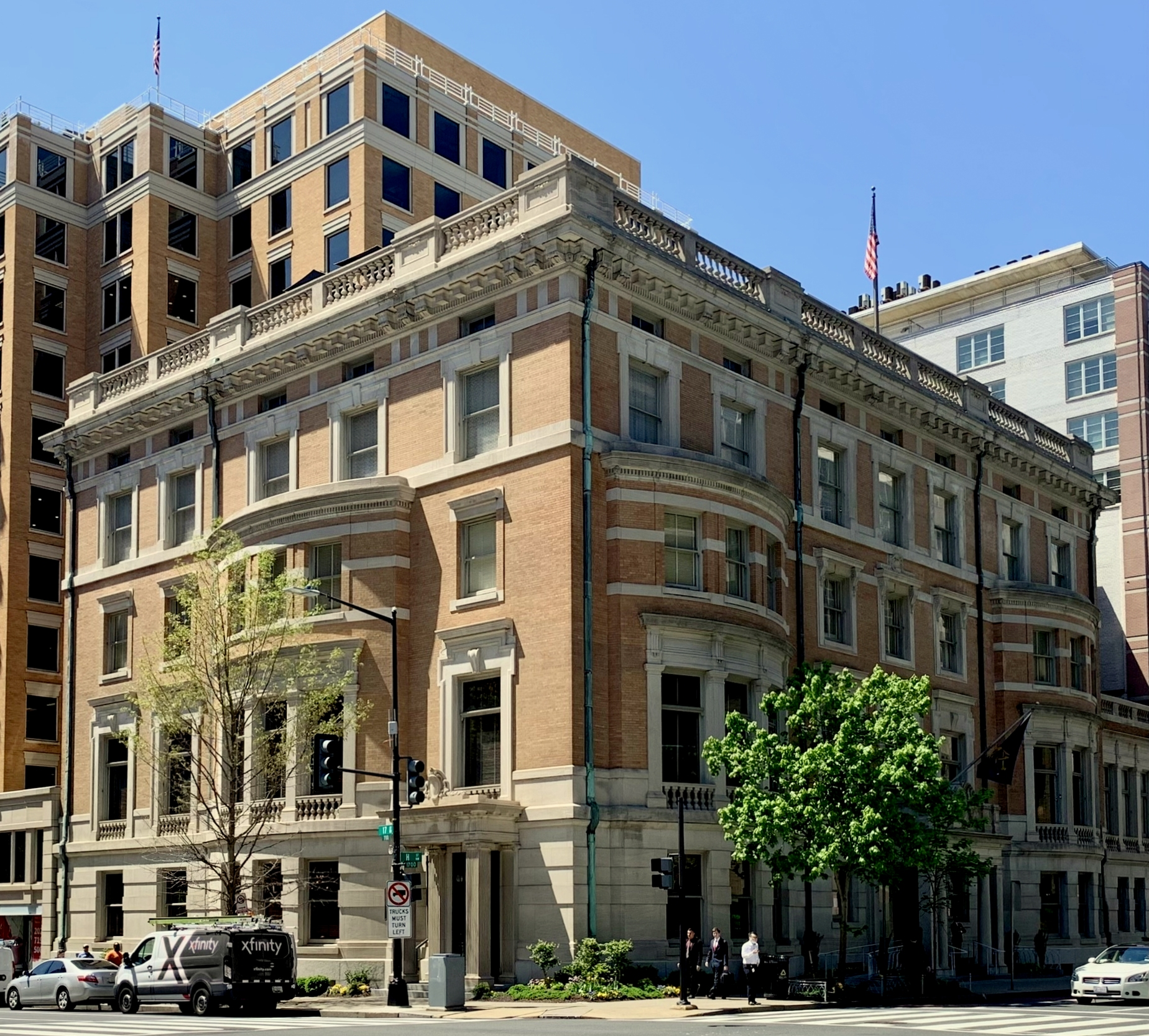
The Metropolitan Club

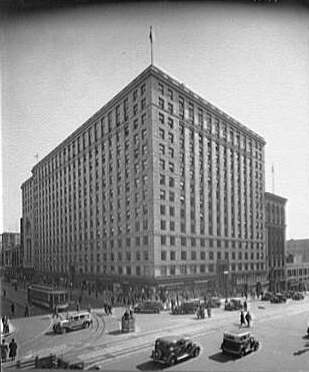
The National Press Club

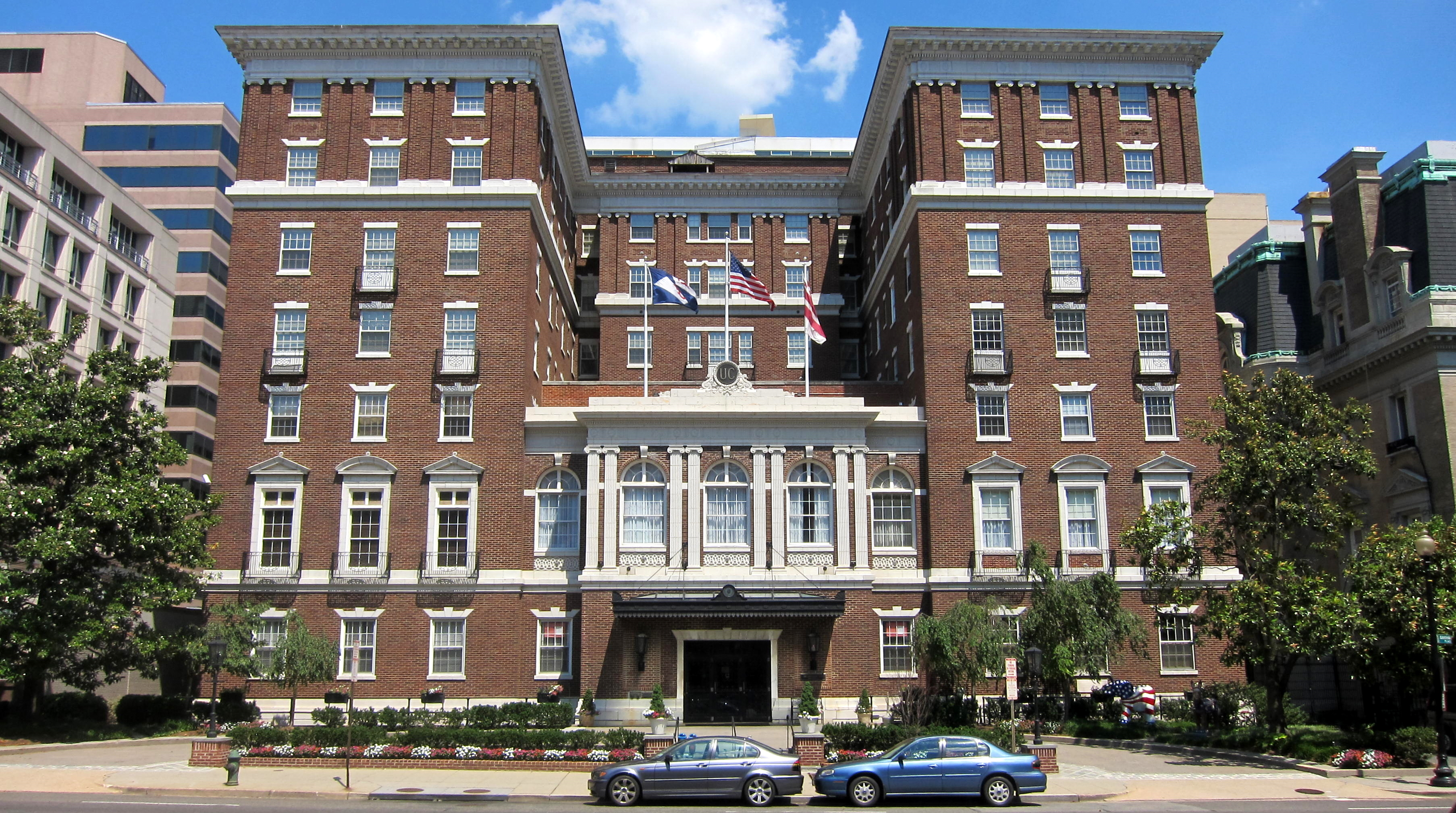
The Racquet Club of Washington (1920–1936); The University Club of Washington, DC (1936–present)

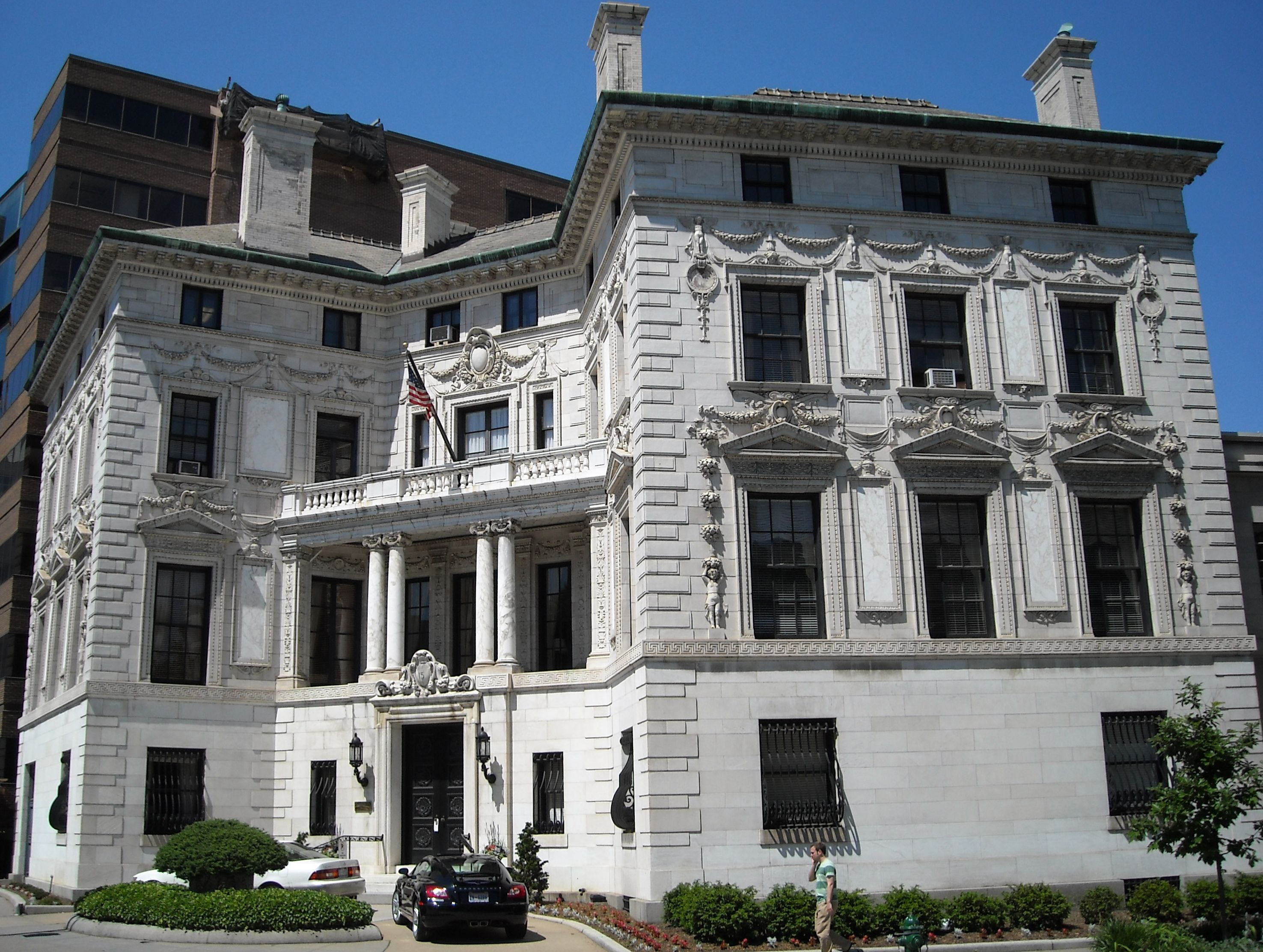
The Washington Club

=== Florida ===
- Jacksonville
  - The River Club of Jacksonville (1954)
- Orlando
  - The Citrus Club (1971)
- Surfside
  - The Surf Club (1930)
- Tallahassee
  - The Governor's Club (1982)
- Tampa
  - The Tampa Club (1982)
  - The University Club of Tampa (1946)

=== Georgia ===
- Atlanta
  - The Buckhead Club (1988)
  - The Burns Club Atlanta (1896)
  - The Capital City Club (1883)
  - The Cherokee Town and Country Club (1956)
  - The Piedmont Driving Club (1887)
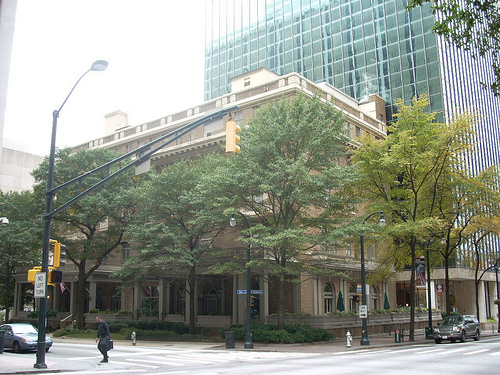
The Capital City Club
- Augusta
  - The Pinnacle Club (1967)
- Savannah
  - The Chatham Club (1968)
  - The Oglethorpe Club (1870)
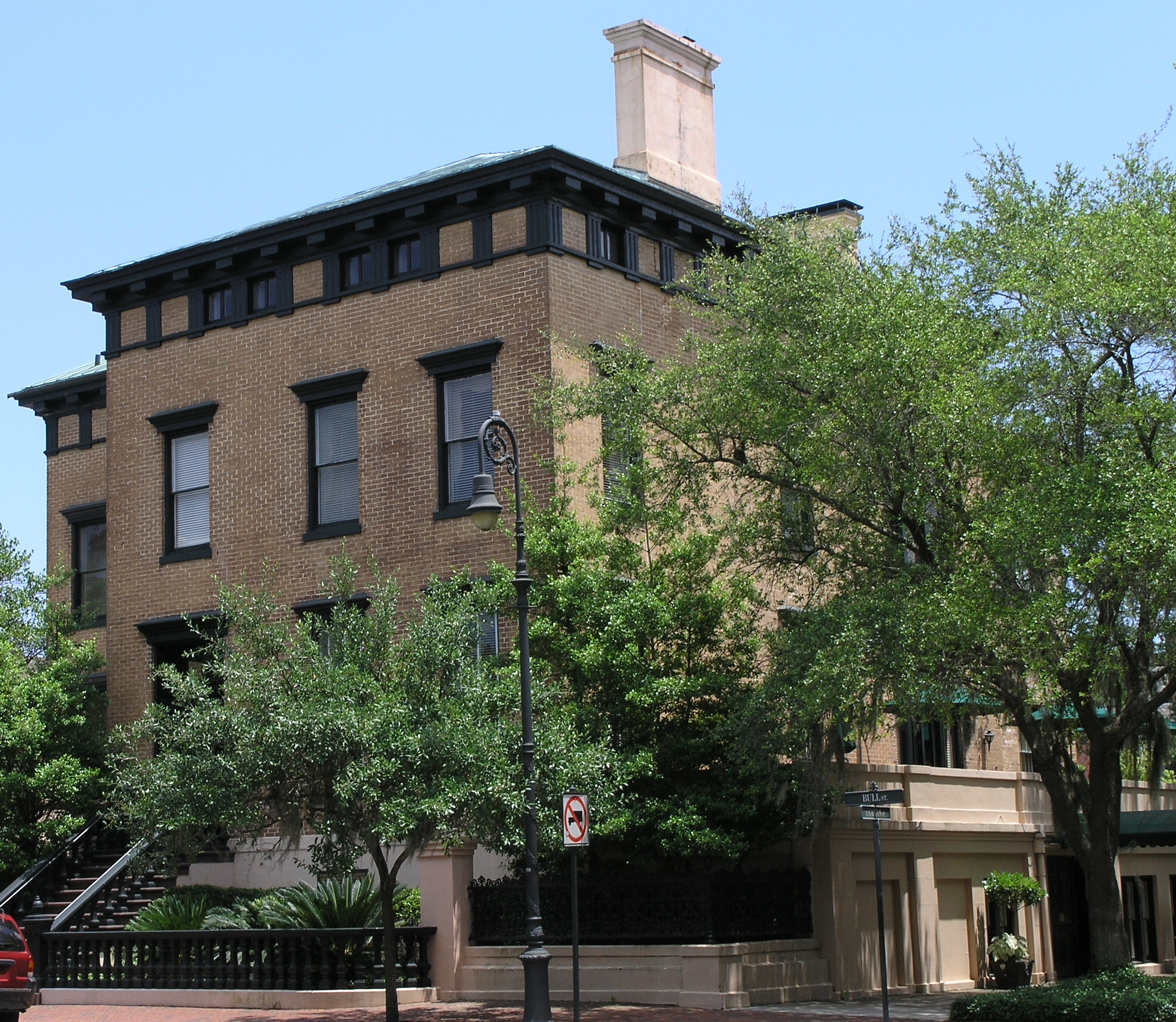
The Oglethorpe Club

=== Hawaii ===
- Honolulu
  - The Pacific Club (1851)
  - Outrigger Canoe Club (1908)

=== Idaho ===
- Boise
  - The Arid Club (1890)

=== Illinois ===
- Chicago
  - The Arts Club of Chicago
  - The Casino Club (1914)
  - The Caxton Club (1895)
  - The Chicago Club (1869)
  - Chicago Yacht Club
  - The Cliff Dwellers Club (1907)
  - Columbia Yacht Club of Chicago
  - The Metropolitan Club
  - The Quadrangle Club (1893)
  - The Racquet Club of Chicago (1923)
  - The Sky-Line Club
  - The Tavern Club
  - The Union League of Chicago (1879)
  - The University Club of Chicago (1887)
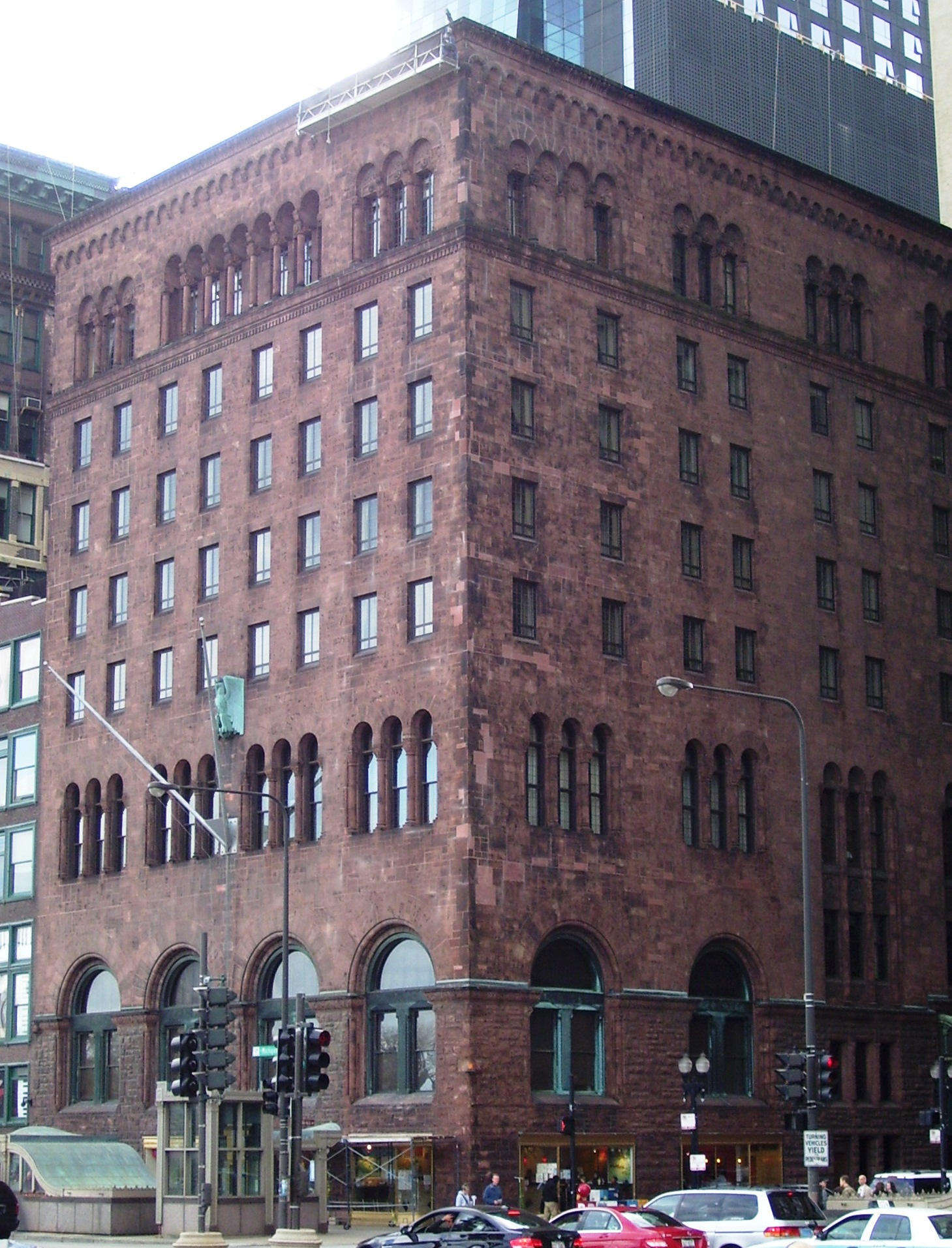
The Chicago Club

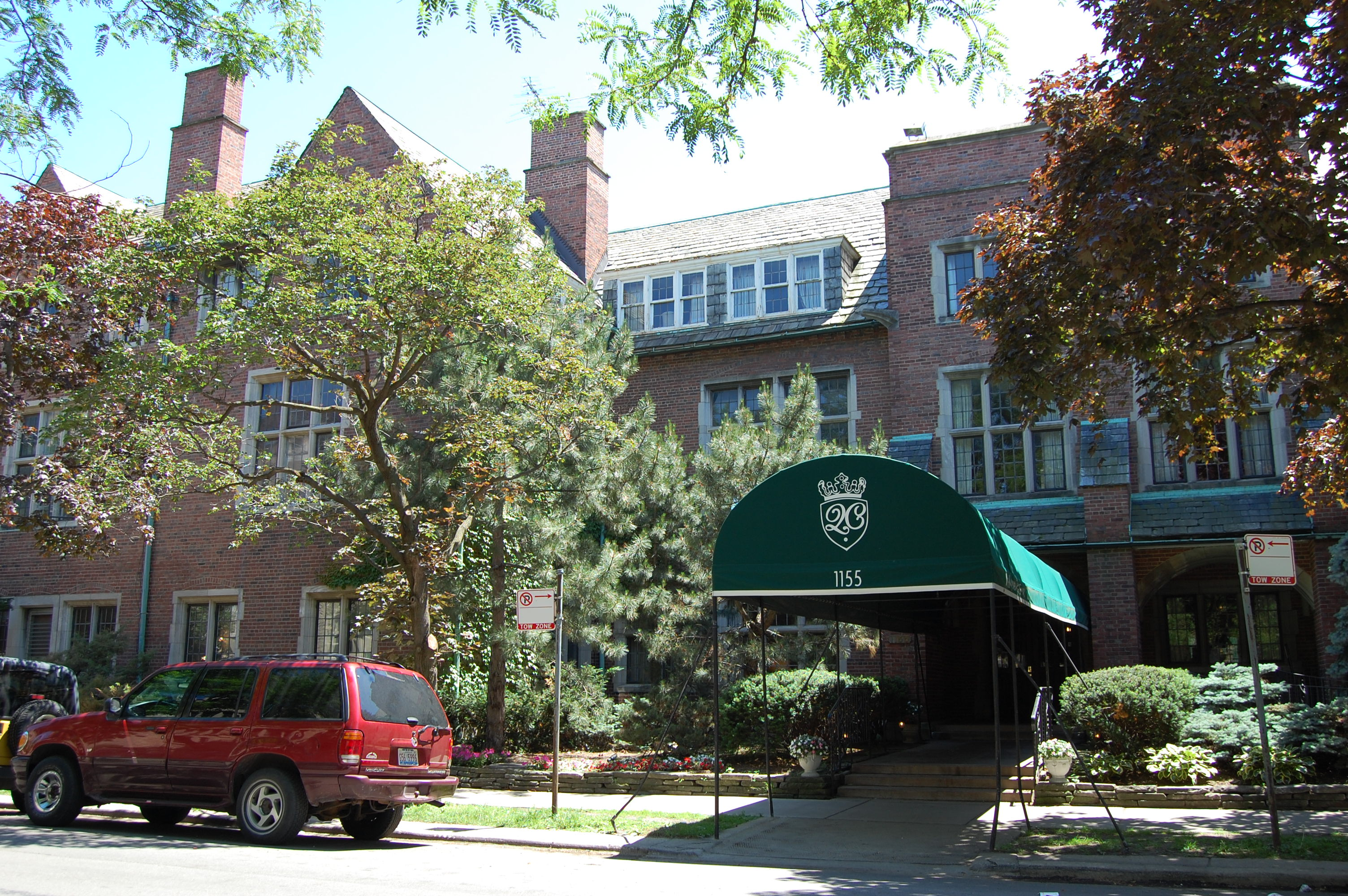
The Quadrangle Club

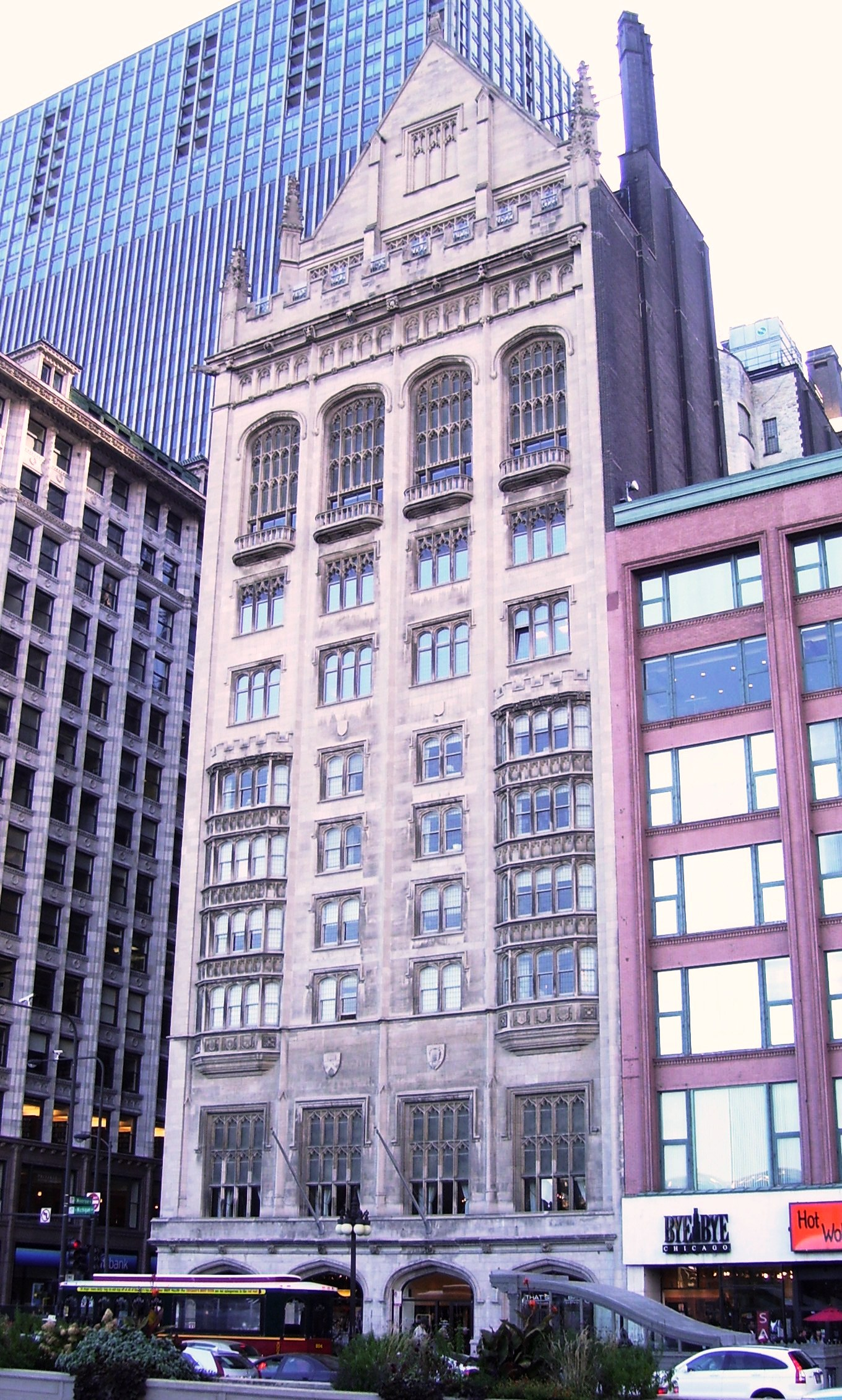
The University Club of Chicago
- Decatur
  - The Decatur Club (1883)
- Oakbrook Terrace
  - The DuPage Club (1984)
- Peoria
  - The Creve Coeur Club (1894)
- Rockford
  - The University Club of Rockford (1911)
- Wilmette
  - The Michigan Shores Club (1904), until 1943 called the Shawnee Club

=== Indiana ===
- Bloomington
  - The University Club of Indiana University (1958)
- Indianapolis
  - The Antelope Club (1947)
  - The Columbia Club (1889)
  - The Indianapolis Press Club (1934–2004), insolvent, but still operates a charitable foundation
  - The University Club of Indianapolis (1893)
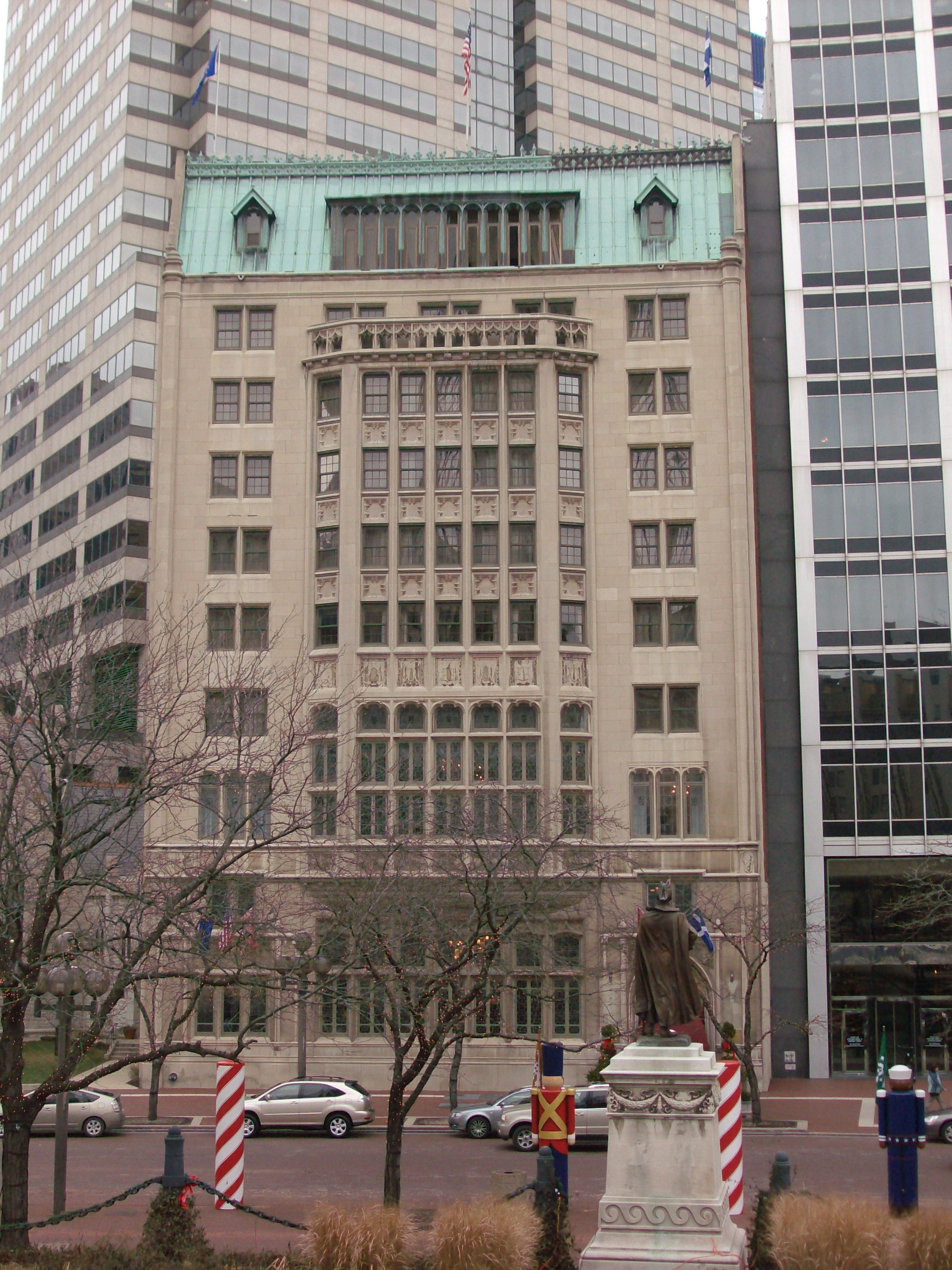
The Columbia Club

=== Iowa ===
- Davenport
  - The Outing Club (1891)
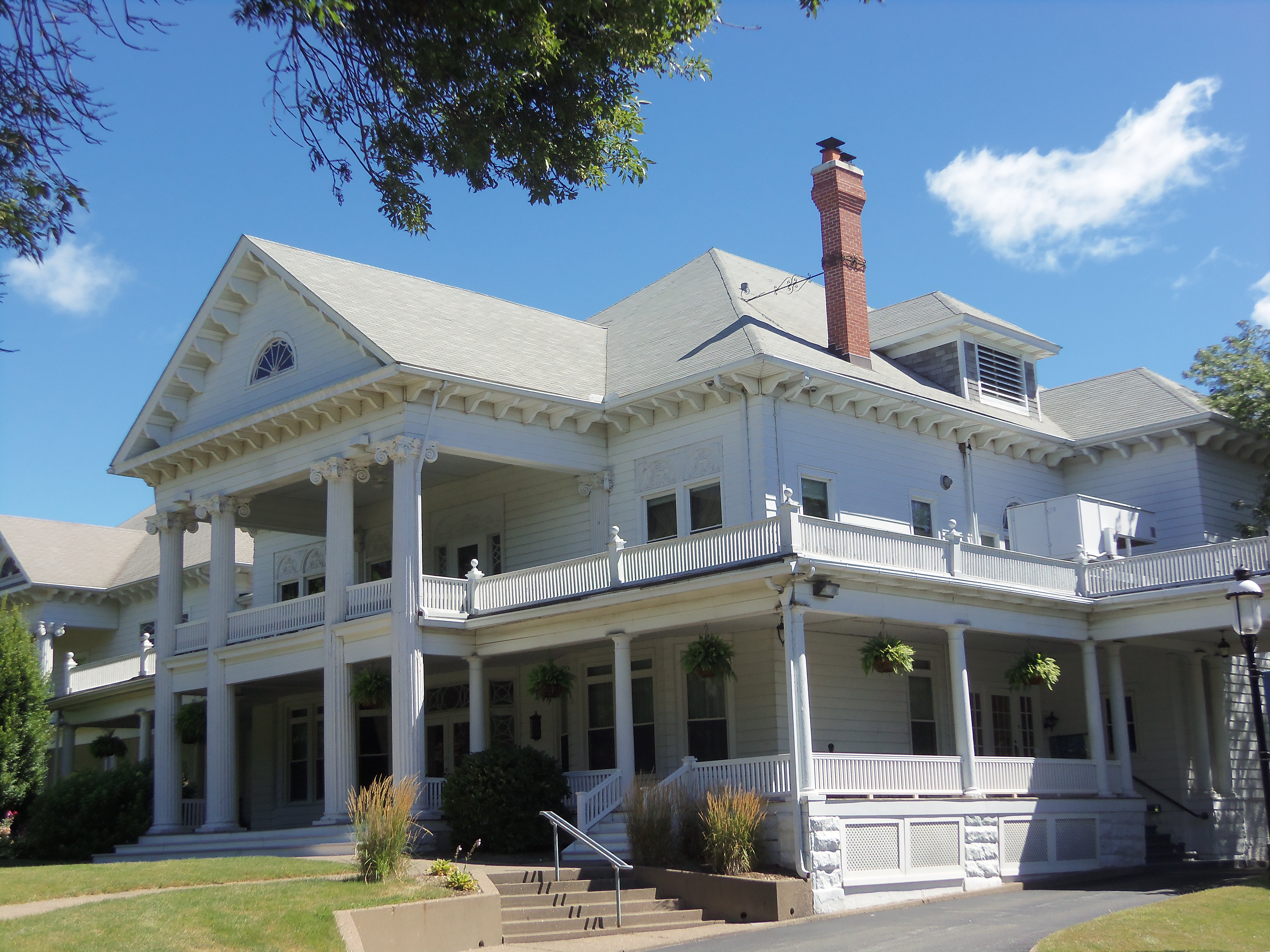
The Outing Club
- Des Moines
  - The Des Moines Embassy Club (1909), formed in 2002 from the merger of the Embassy Club and Des Moines Club

=== Kansas ===
- Kansas City
  - The Kansas City Athletic Club (1887)

=== Kentucky ===
- Lexington
  - The Club at Spindletop Hall (1965)
  - The Lexington Club (1860)
- Louisville
  - The Pendennis Club (1881)
  - The University Club of Louisville (1991)
  - The Louisville Thoroughbred Society (2018)
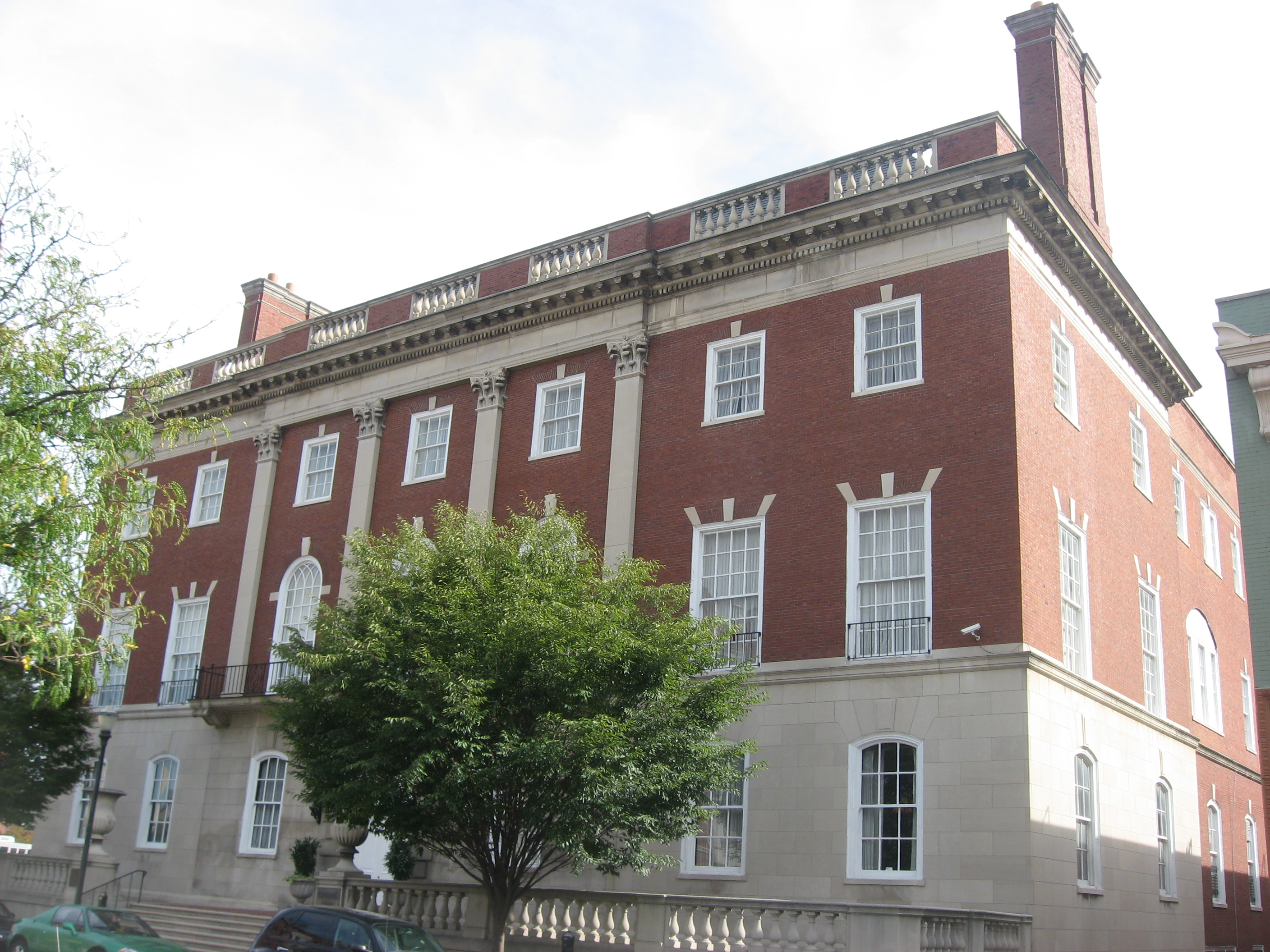
The Pendennis Club

=== Louisiana ===
- Baton Rouge
  - The City Club (1957)
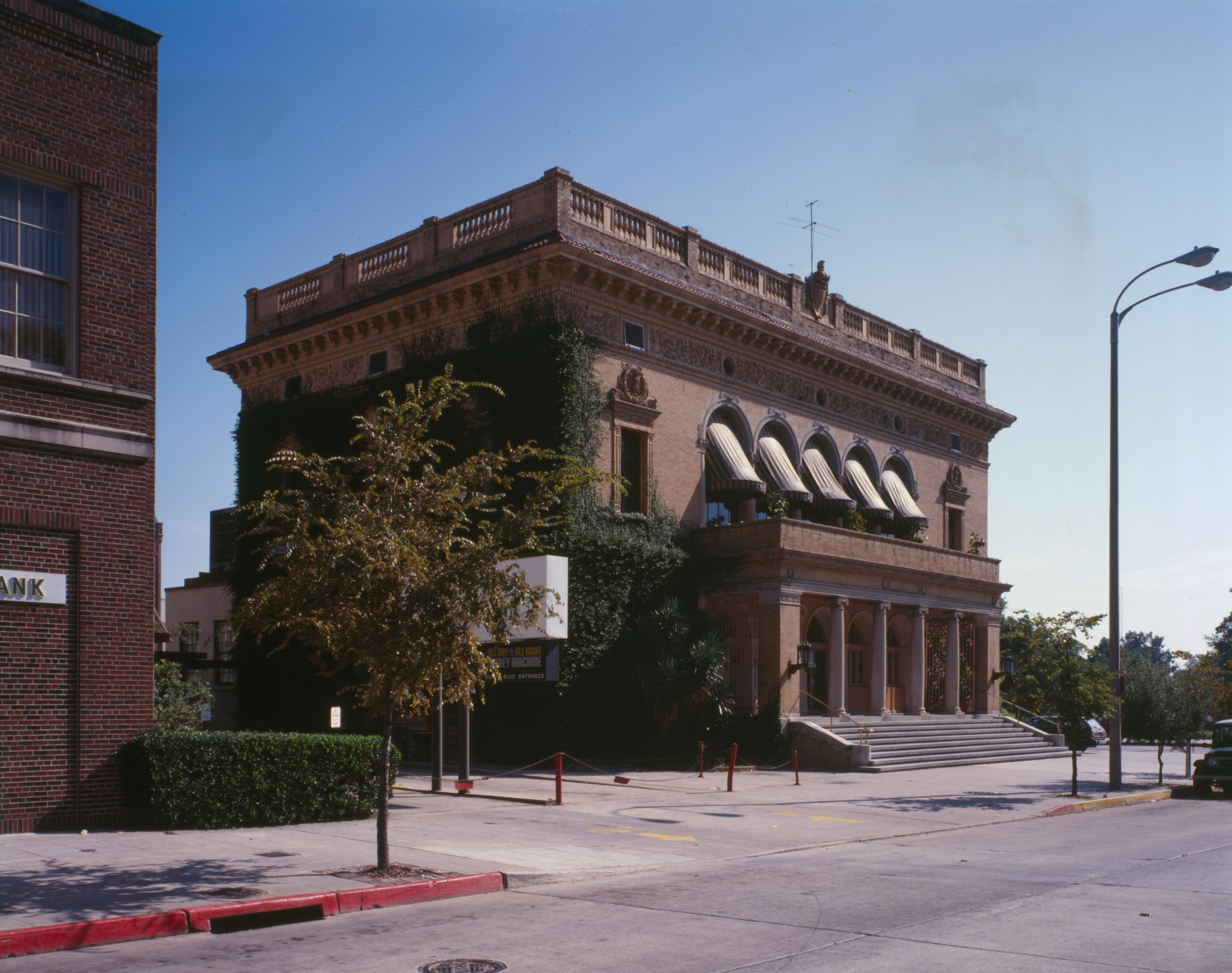
The City Club of Baton Rouge
- Lafayette
  - The Petroleum Club of Lafayette (1953)
- Lake Charles
  - The Pioneer Club (1948)
- Monroe
  - The Lotus Club (1920)
- Morgan City
  - The Petroleum Club of Morgan City (1966)
- New Orleans
  - The Boston Club (1841), oldest in the South.
  - Louisiana Debating and Literary Association (1877)
  - Le Moyne de Bienville Club (1964)
  - The New Orleans Athletic Club (1872)
  - The Pickwick Club (1857)
  - The Round Table Club (1898)
  - The Stratford Club (1897)
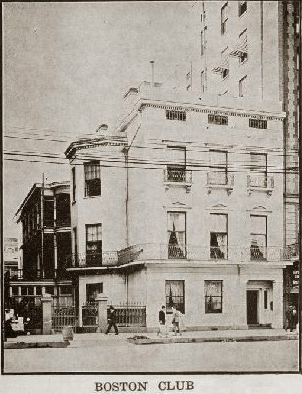
The Boston Club

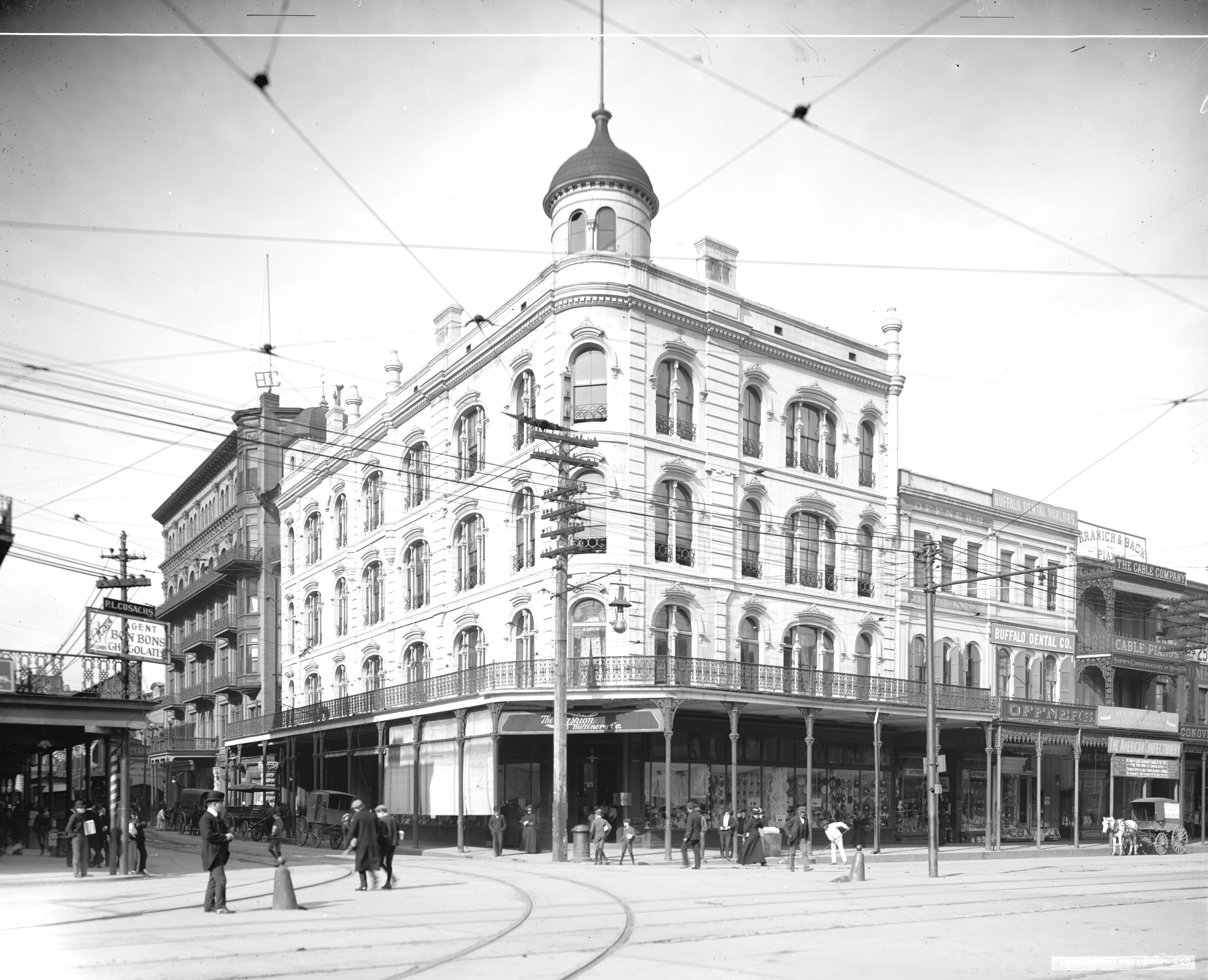
The Chess, Checkers, & Whist Club (1883–1932)

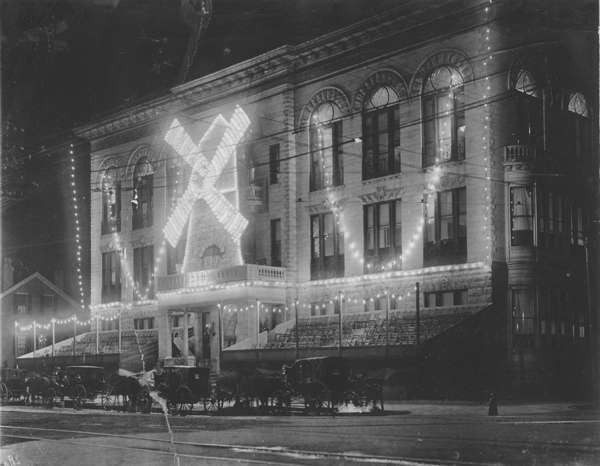
The Harmony Club (1896–1930)
- Shreveport
  - The Petroleum Club of Shreveport (1948)
  - The Shreveport Club (1946)

=== Maine ===
- Portland
  - The Cumberland Club (1877)
  - The Portland Club (1886)
  - The Woodfords Club (1913)
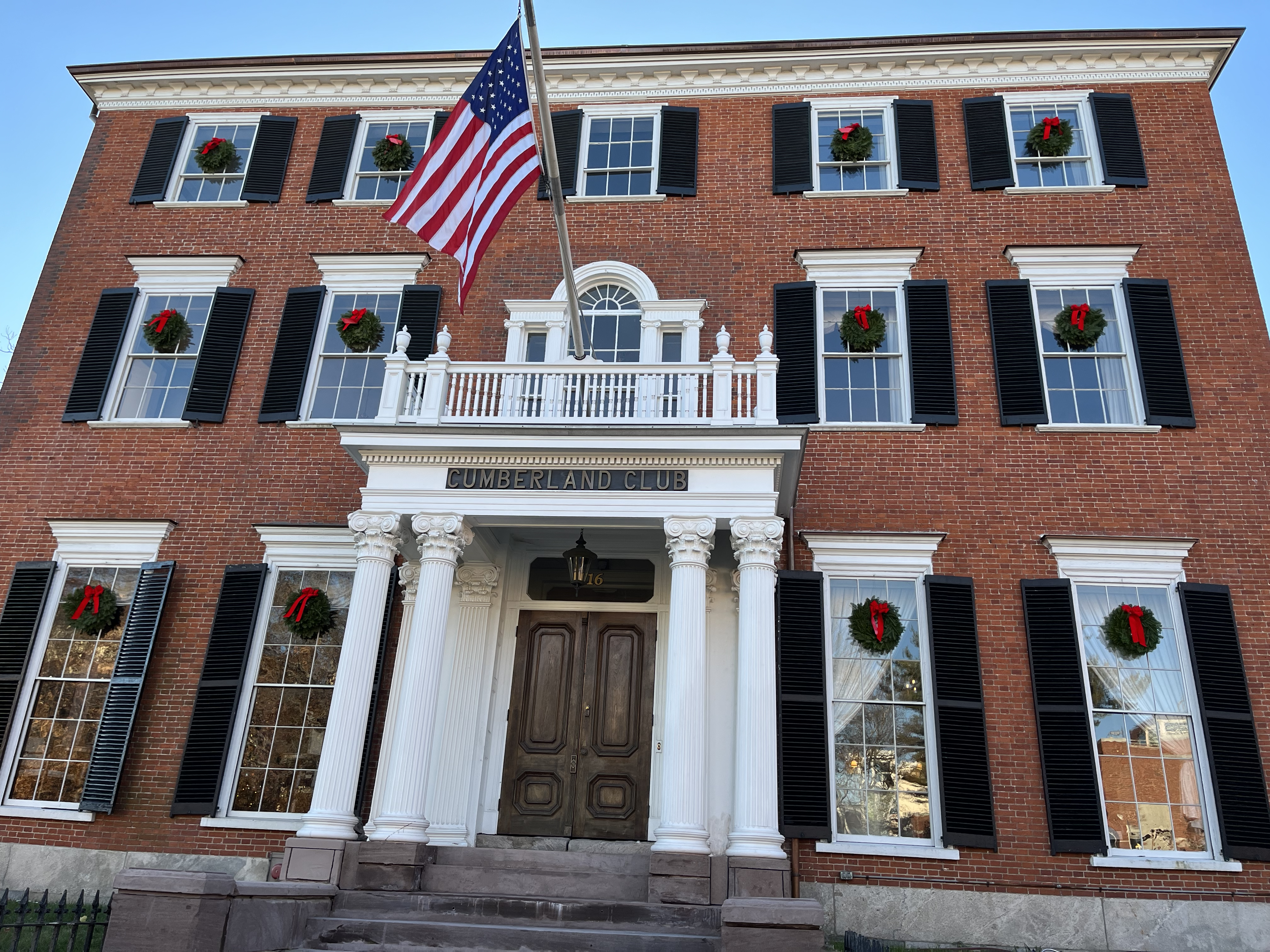
The Cumberland Club

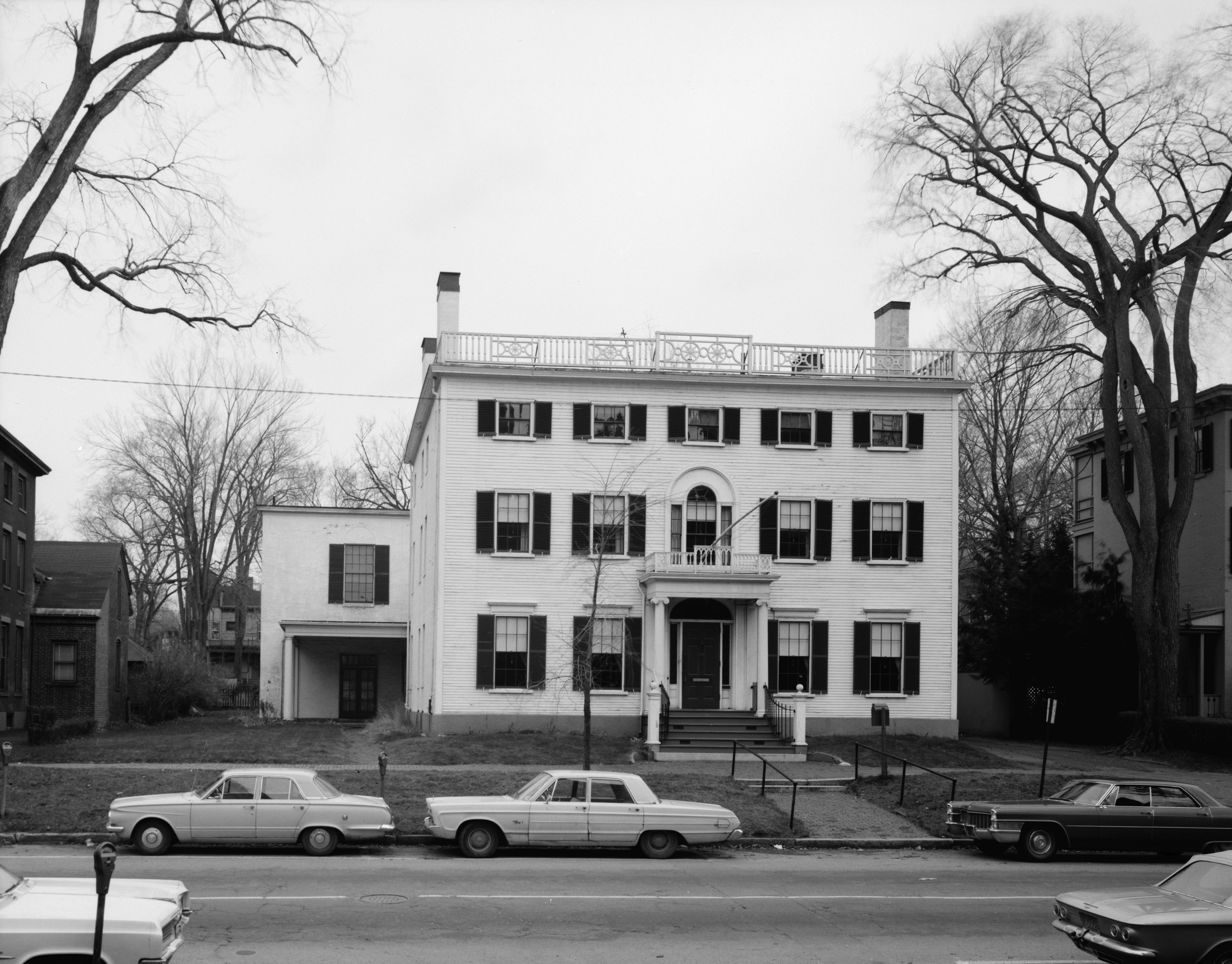
The Portland Club

=== Maryland ===
- Annapolis
  - The Annapolitan Club
- Baltimore
  - The Center Club (1962)
  - The Engineers Club (1905)
  - The Johns Hopkins Club (1899)
  - The Maryland Club (1857)
  - The 14 West Hamilton Street Club (1925)
  - The Hamilton Street Club
  - The Mt. Vernon Club
  - The Woman's Club of Roland Park
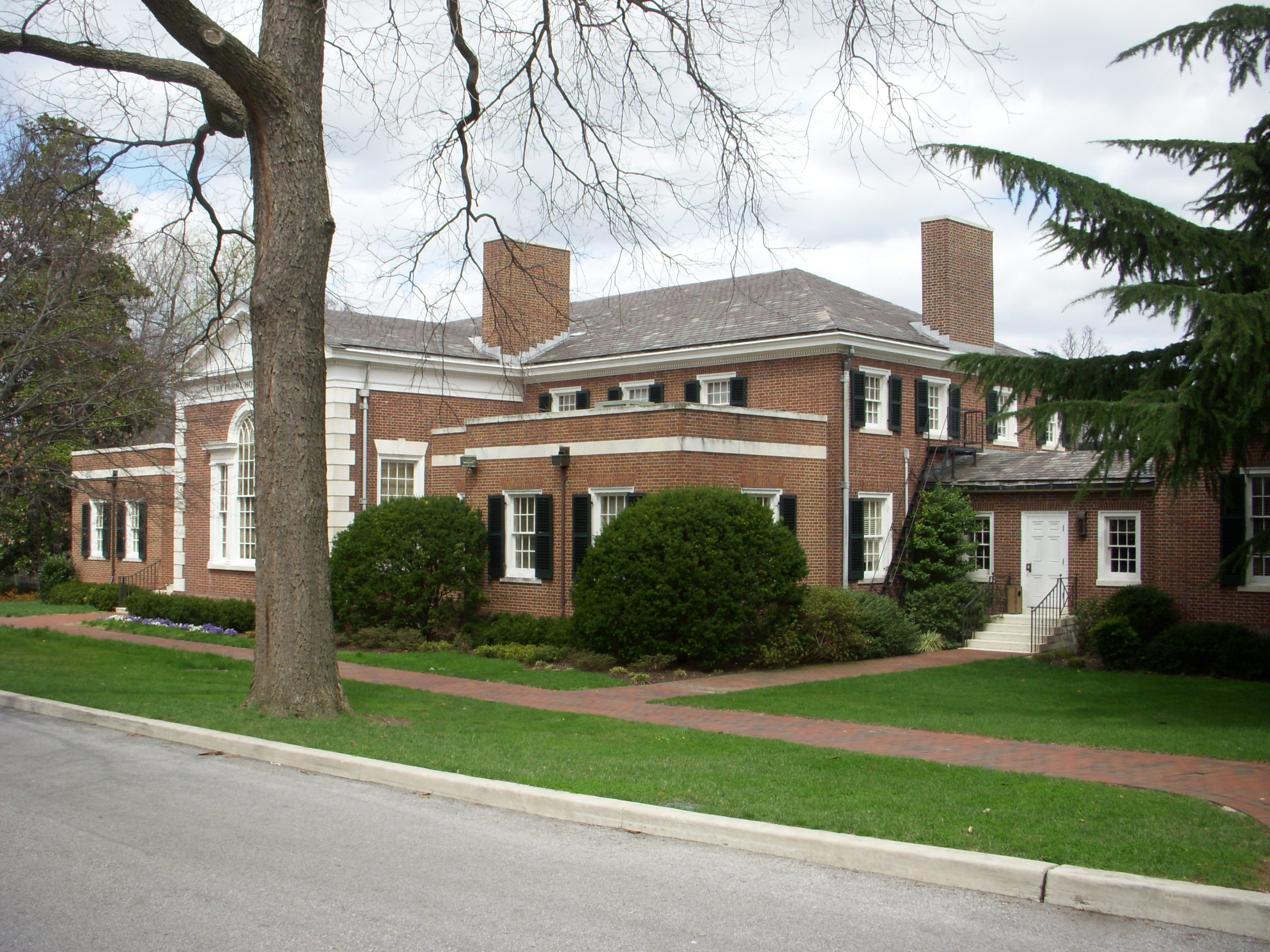
The Johns Hopkins Club
- South River
  - The South River Club (c.1690); oldest existing gentlemen's club in North America
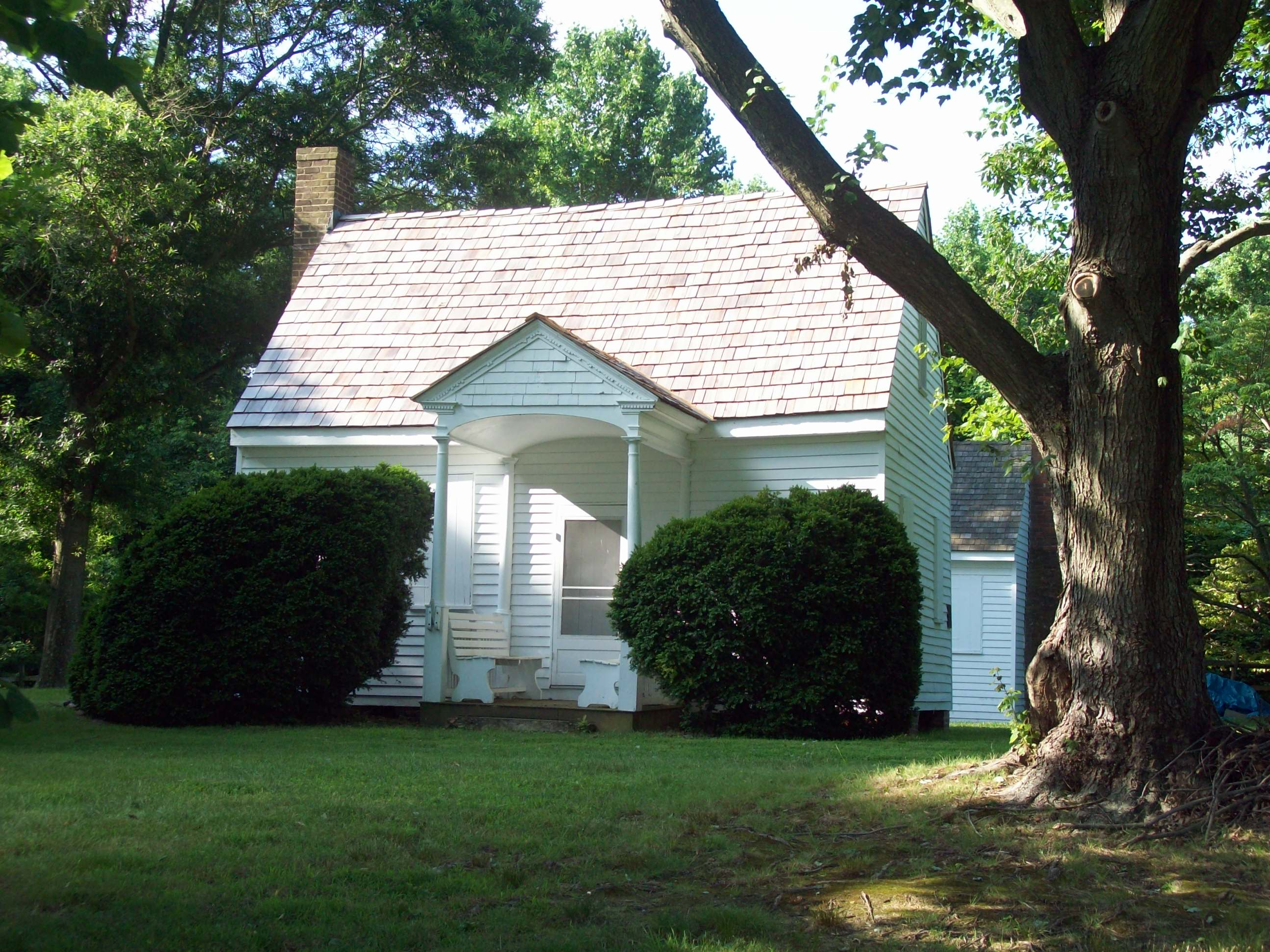
The South River Club

=== Massachusetts ===
- Amherst
  - The University of Massachusetts University Club (1935)
- Andover
  - The Lanam Club (1957)
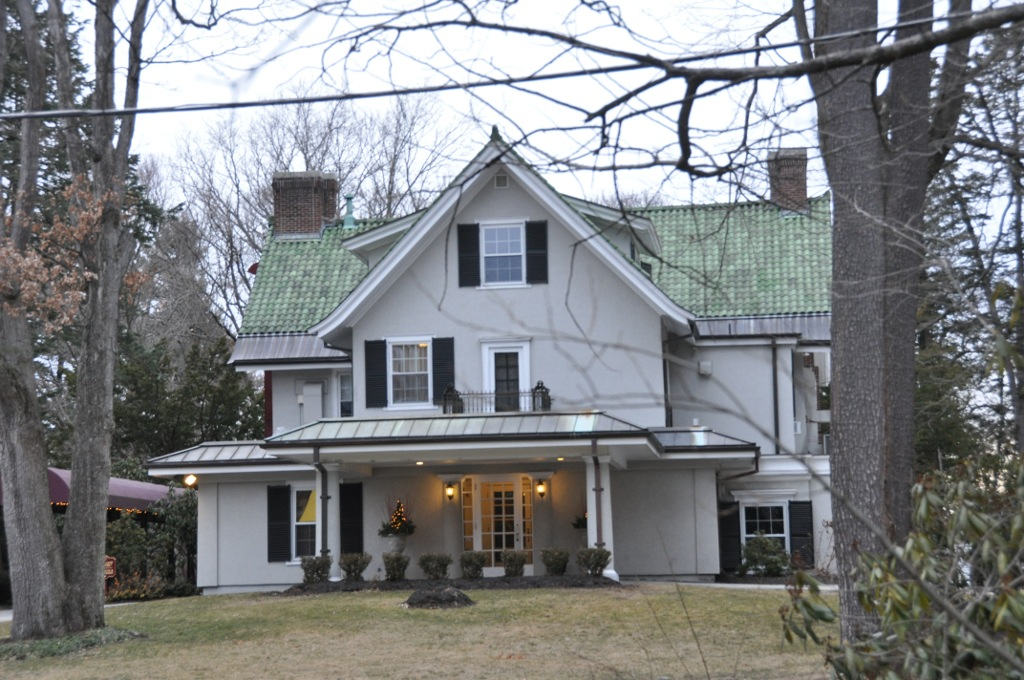
The Lanam Club
- Boston
  - The Algonquin Club (1885)
  - The Badminton & Tennis Club (1908)
  - The Boston College Club (1913)
  - The Club of Odd Volumes (1887)
  - The Harvard Club of Boston (1908)
  - The St. Botolph Club (1880)
  - The Somerset Club (1852)
  - The Tavern Club (1884)
  - The Tennis and Racquet Club (1902)
  - The Union Boat Club (1851)
  - The Union Club of Boston (1863)
  - The University Club of Boston (1891)
  - The Wardroom Club of Boston (1899), Founded in 1899 as a direct result of the Spanish–American War, is based in the old Charlestown Navy Yard
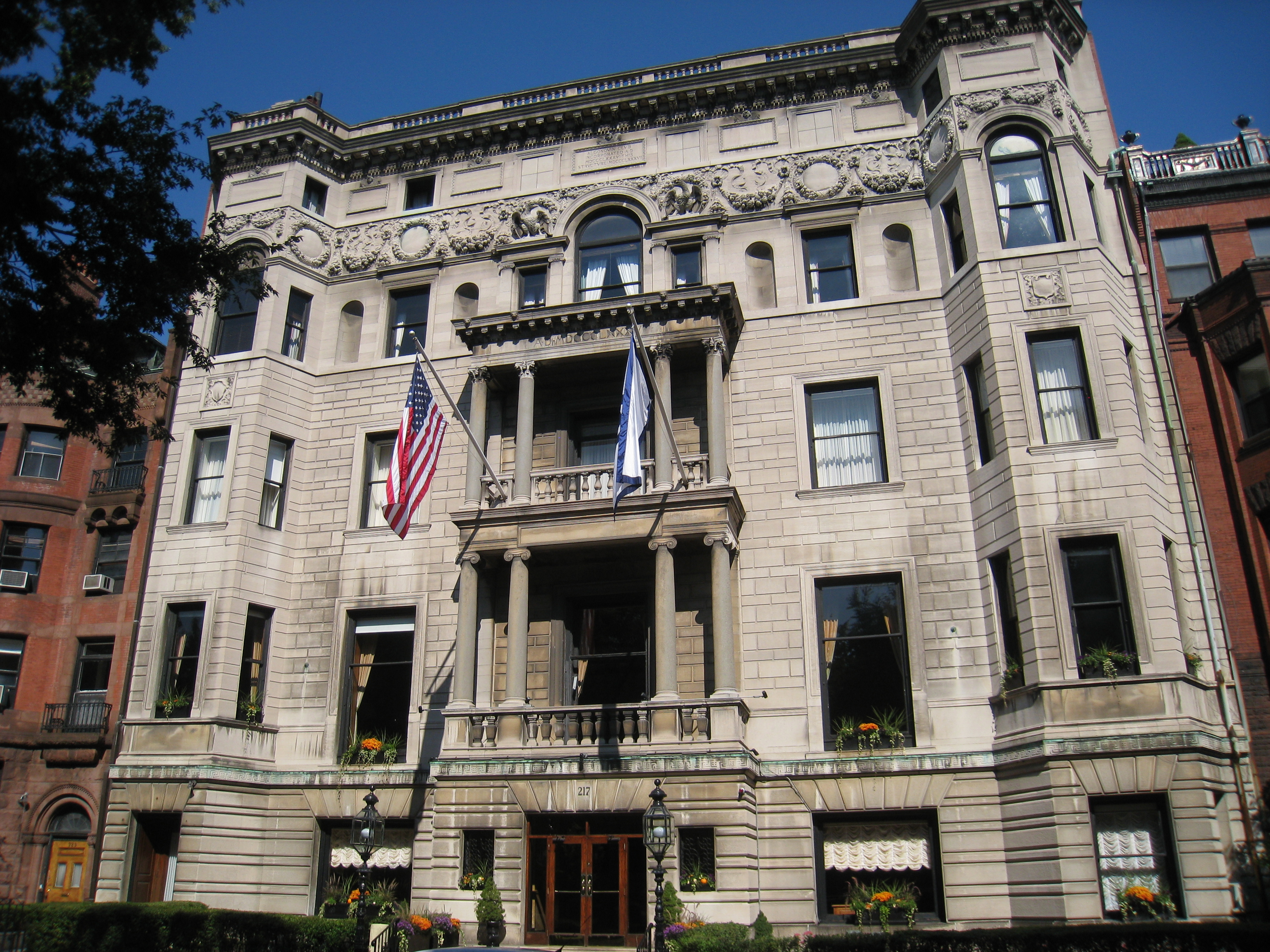
The Algonquin Club

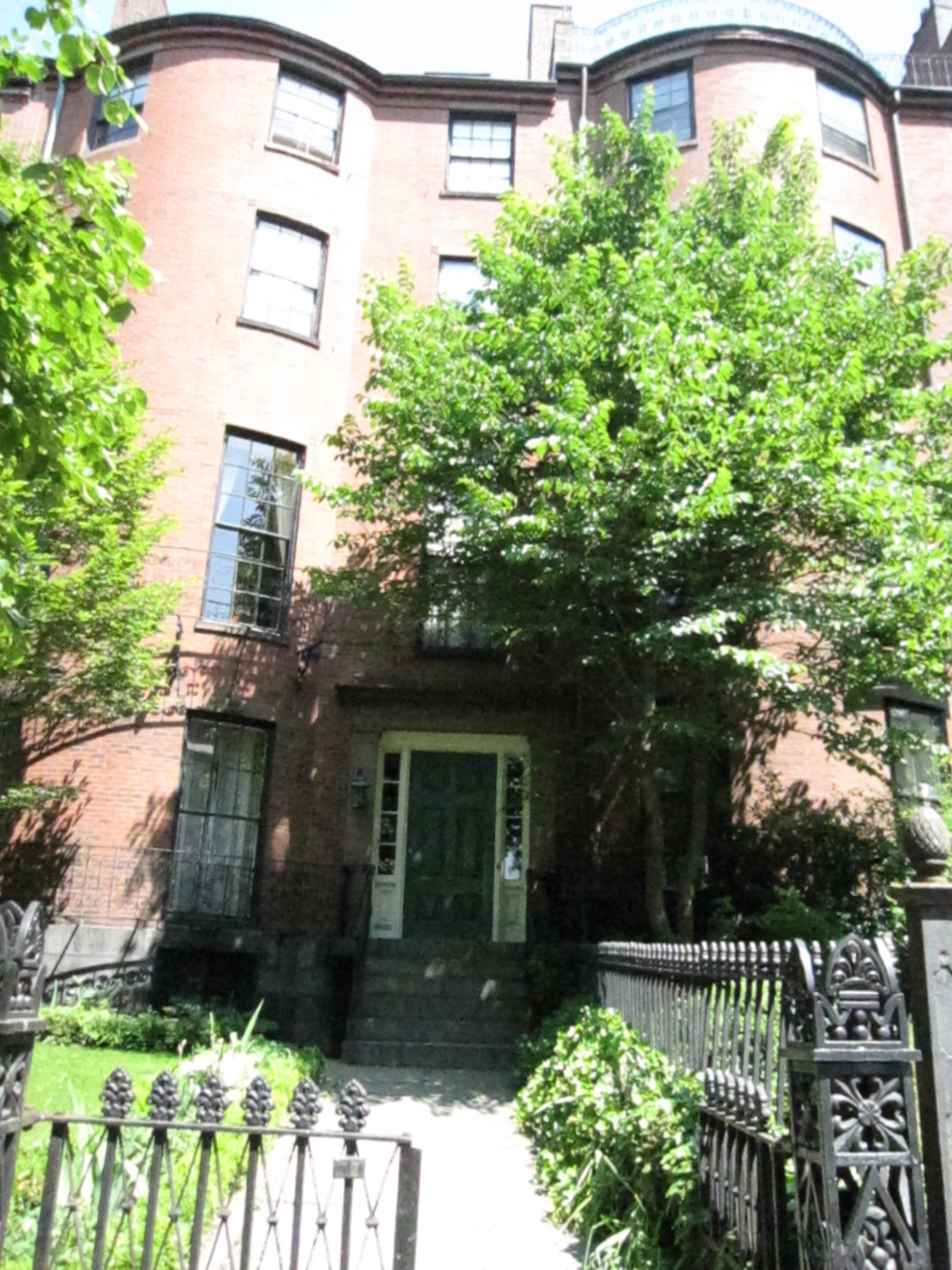
The Club of Odd Volumes

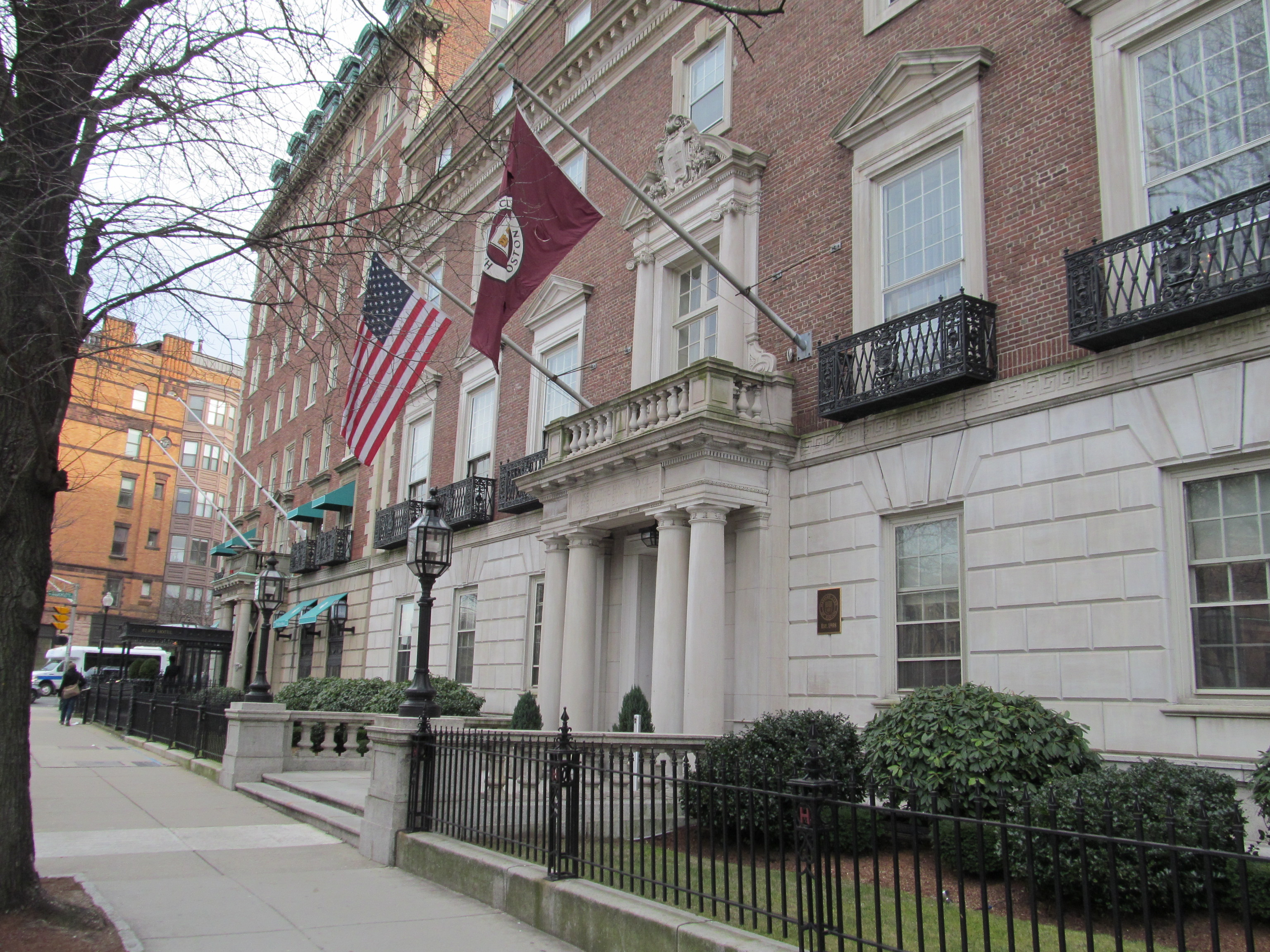
The Harvard Club of Boston

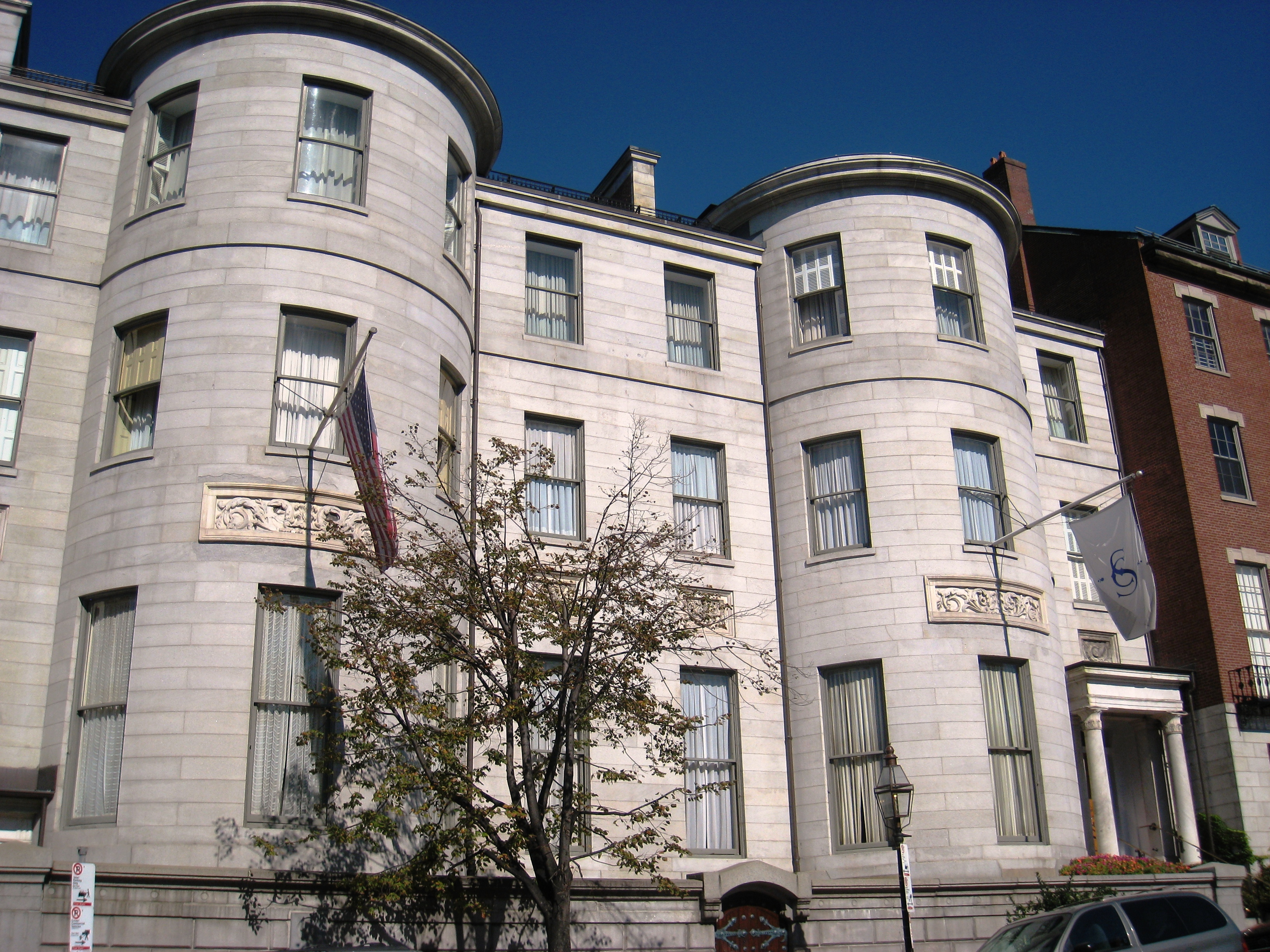
The Somerset Club

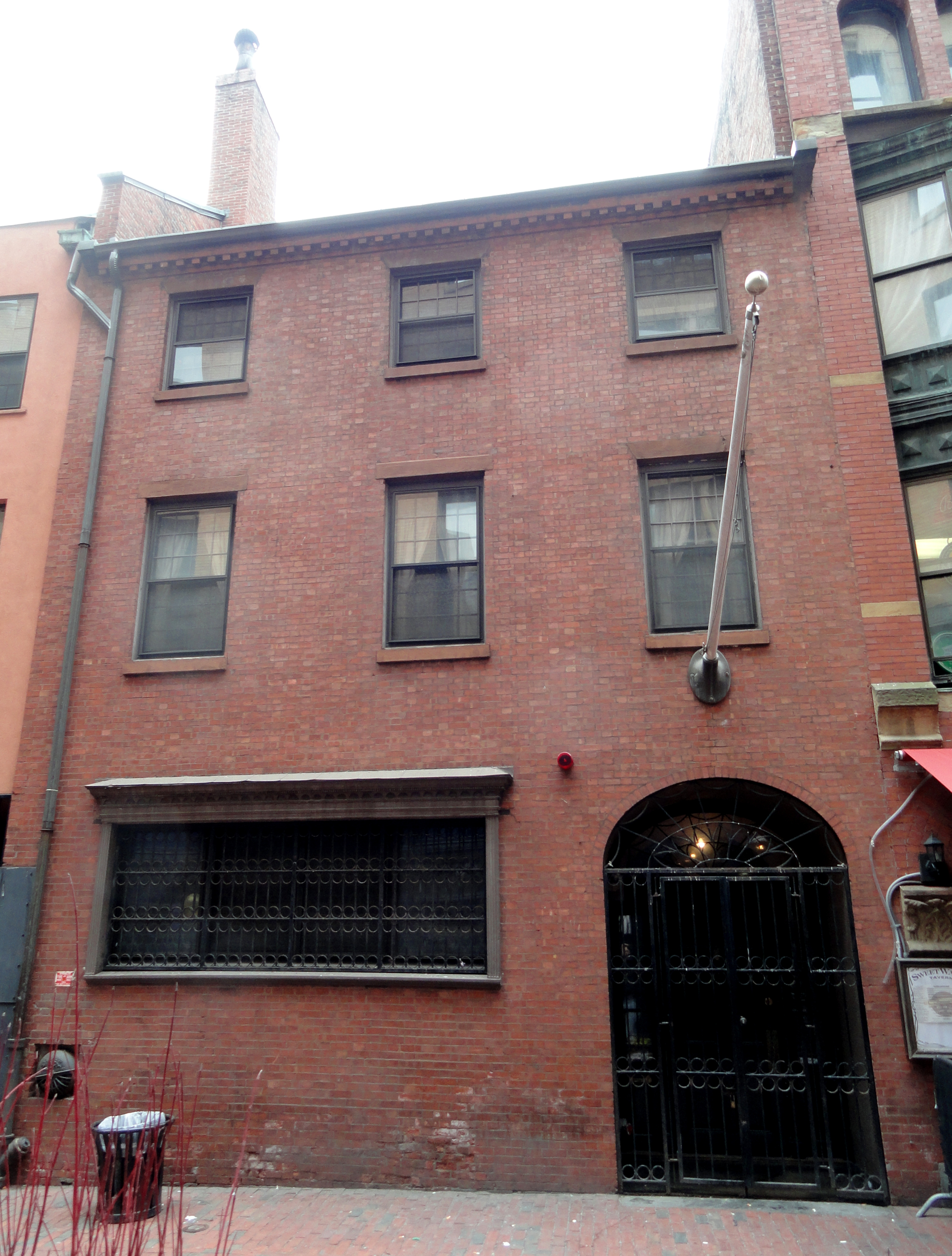
The Tavern Club

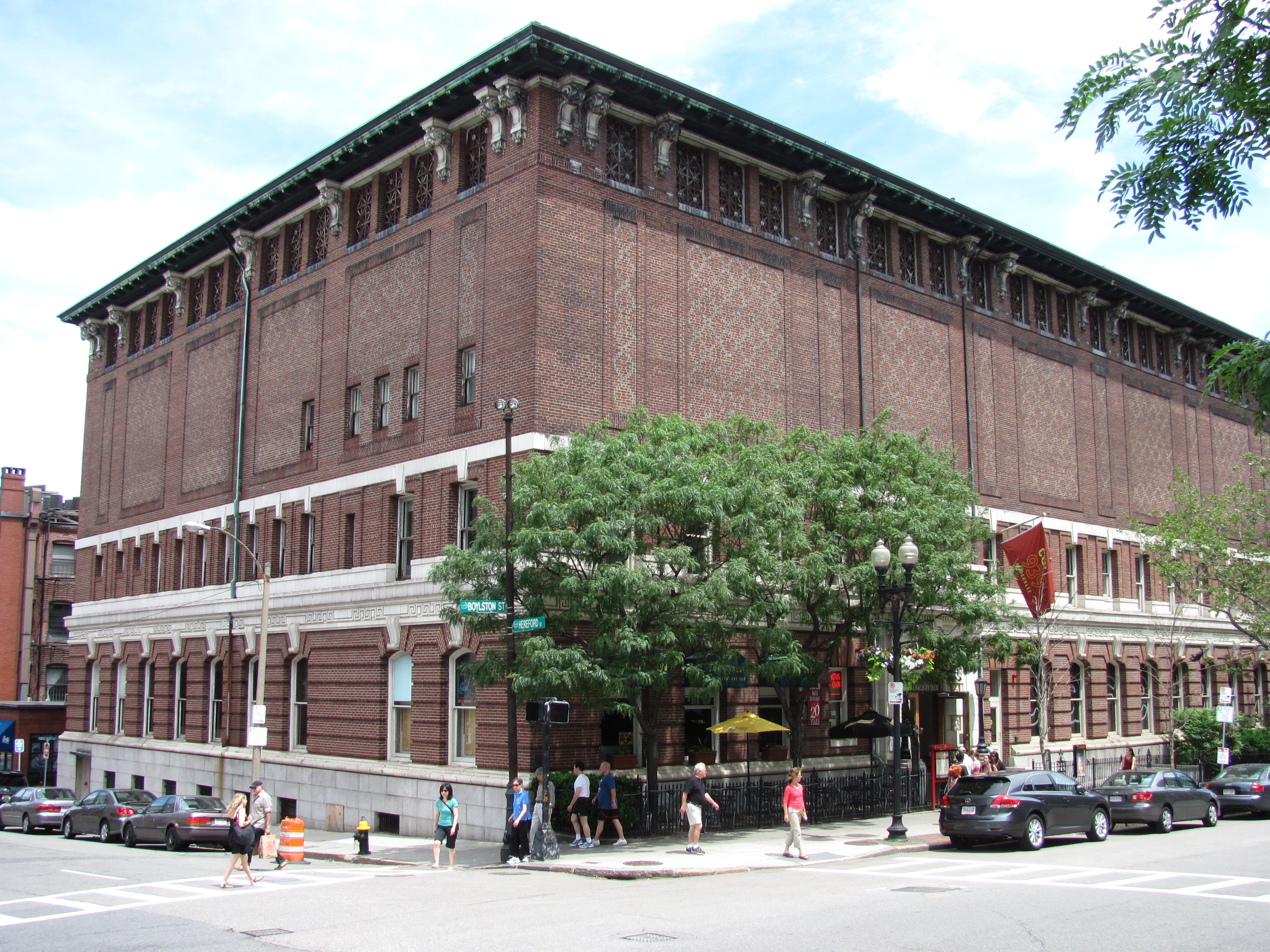
The Tennis and Racquet Club

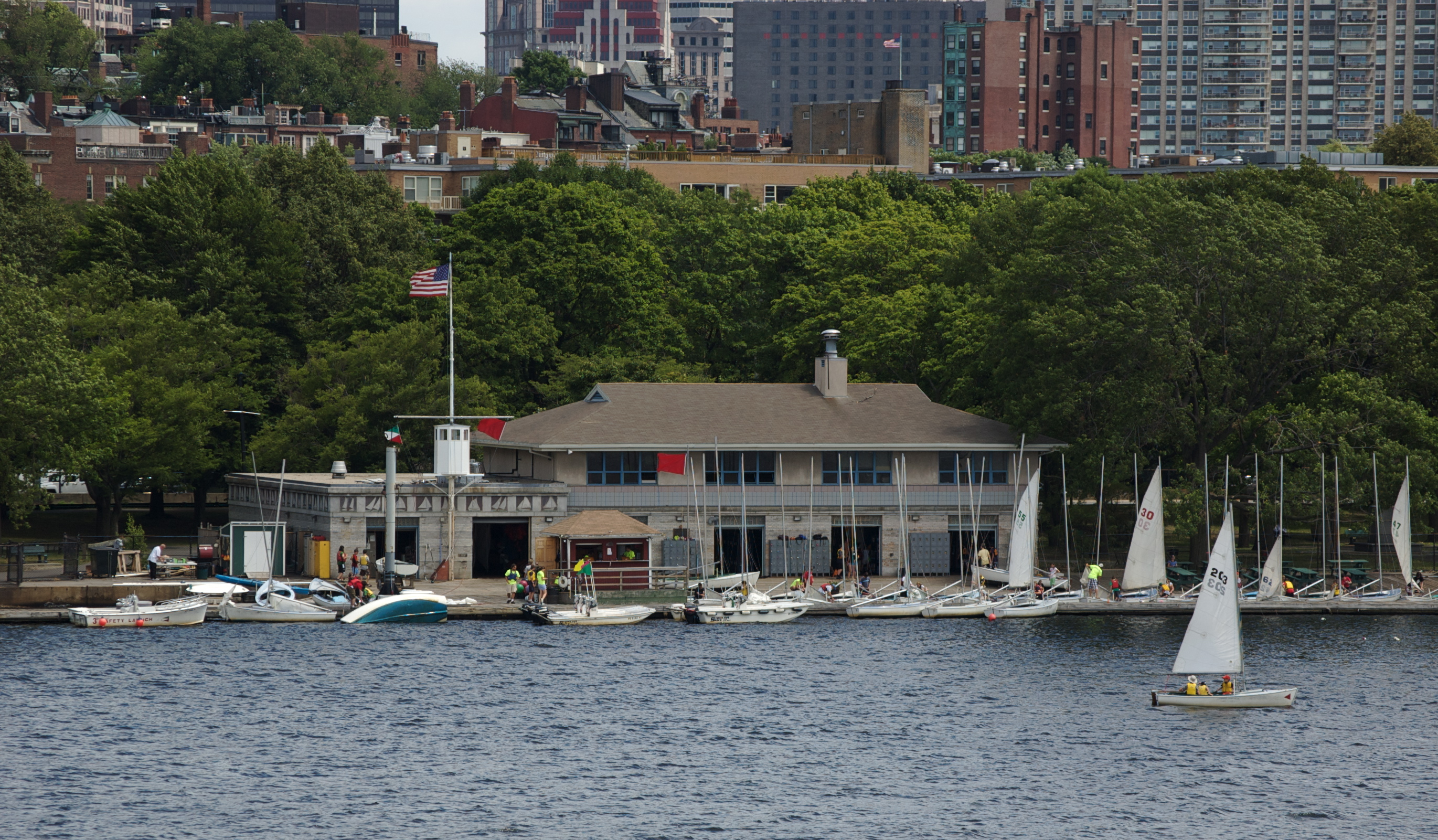
The Union Boat Club

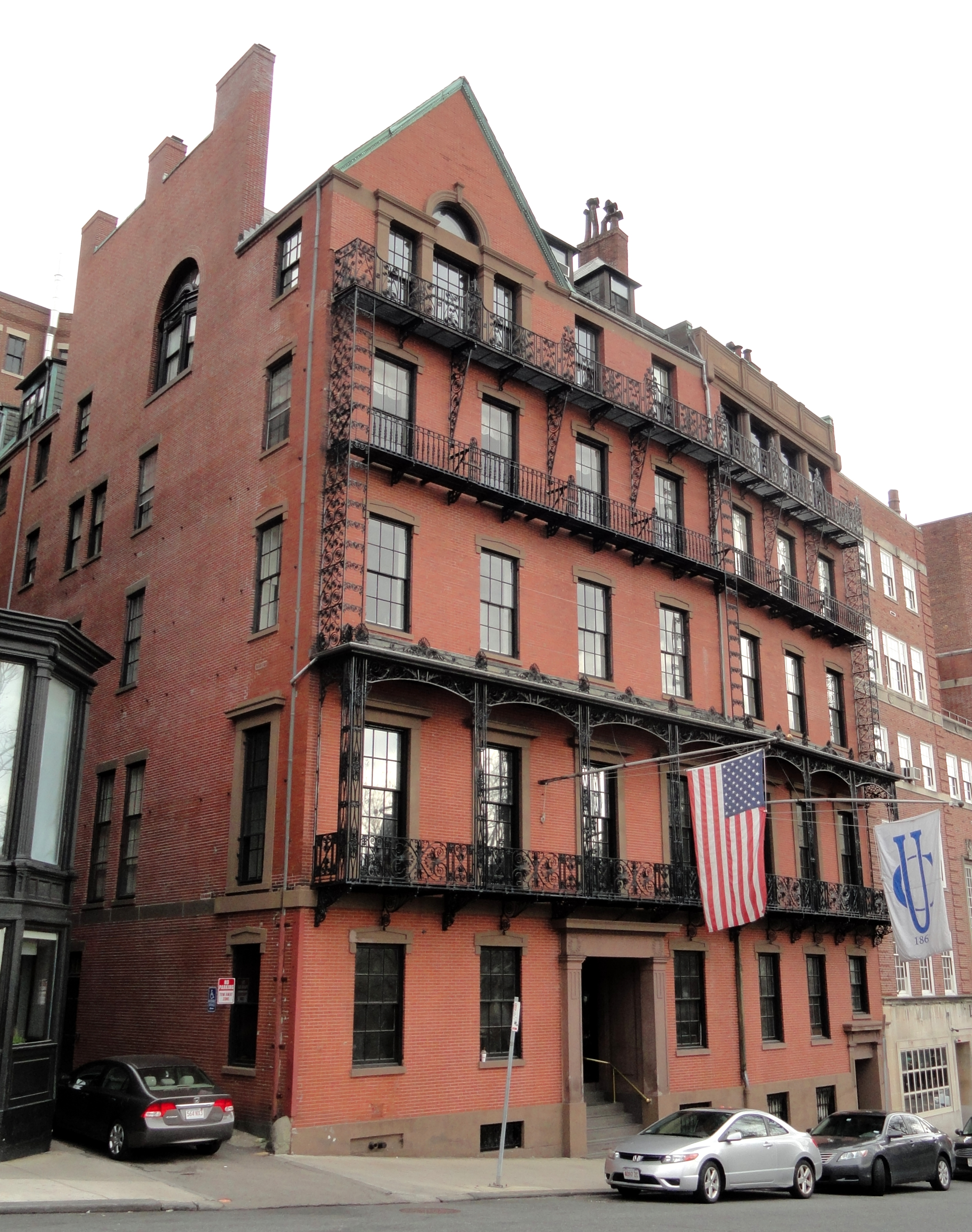
The Union Club of Boston
- Cambridge
  - The Harvard Faculty Club (1920)
- Fitchburg
  - The Fay Club (1910)
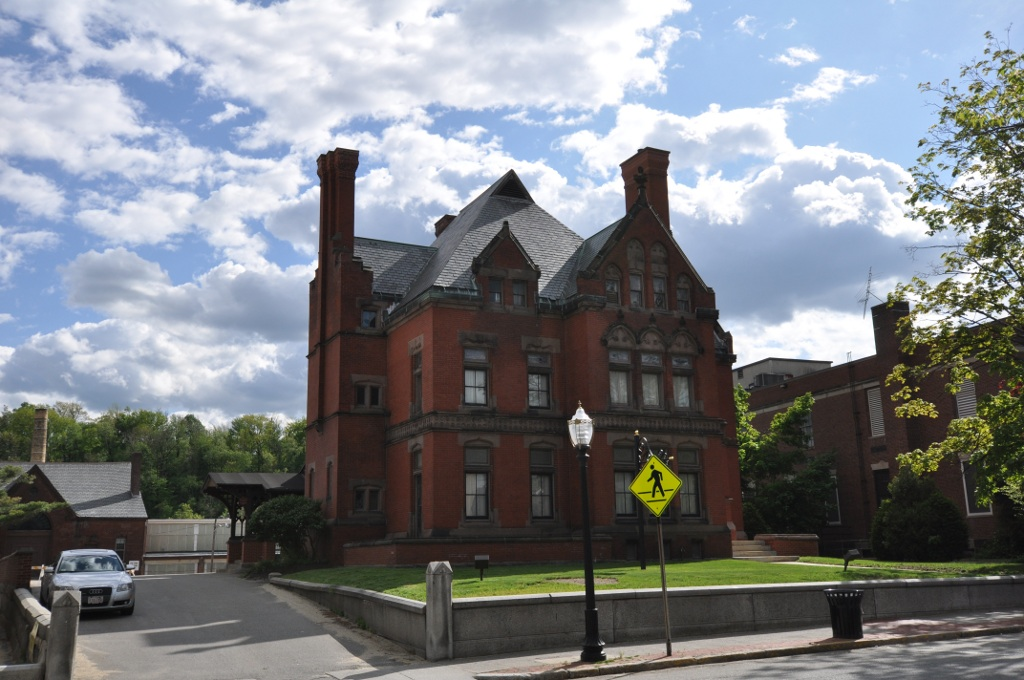
The Fay Club
- Lenox
  - The Lenox Club (1864)
- New Bedford
  - The Wamsutta Club (1866)
- Newburyport
  - The Dalton Club (1898)
- Plymouth
  - The Old Colony Club (1769), third oldest existing gentlemen's club in the United States (behind the South River Club and the Schuylkill Fishing Company)
- Quincy
  - The Neighborhood Club (1916)
- Worcester
  - The Worcester Club (1888)
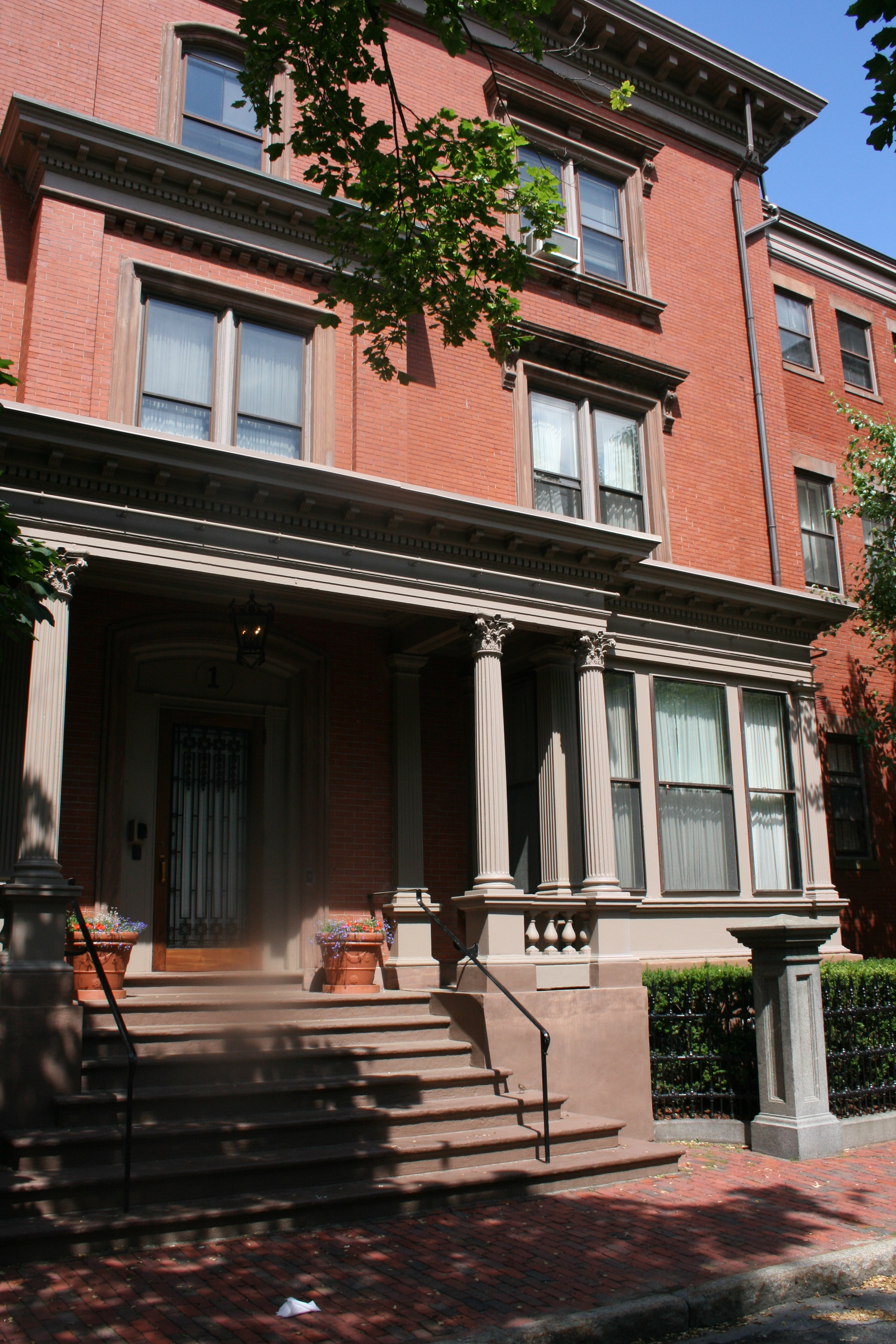
The Worcester Club

=== Michigan ===
- Calumet
  - The Miscowaubik Club (1903)
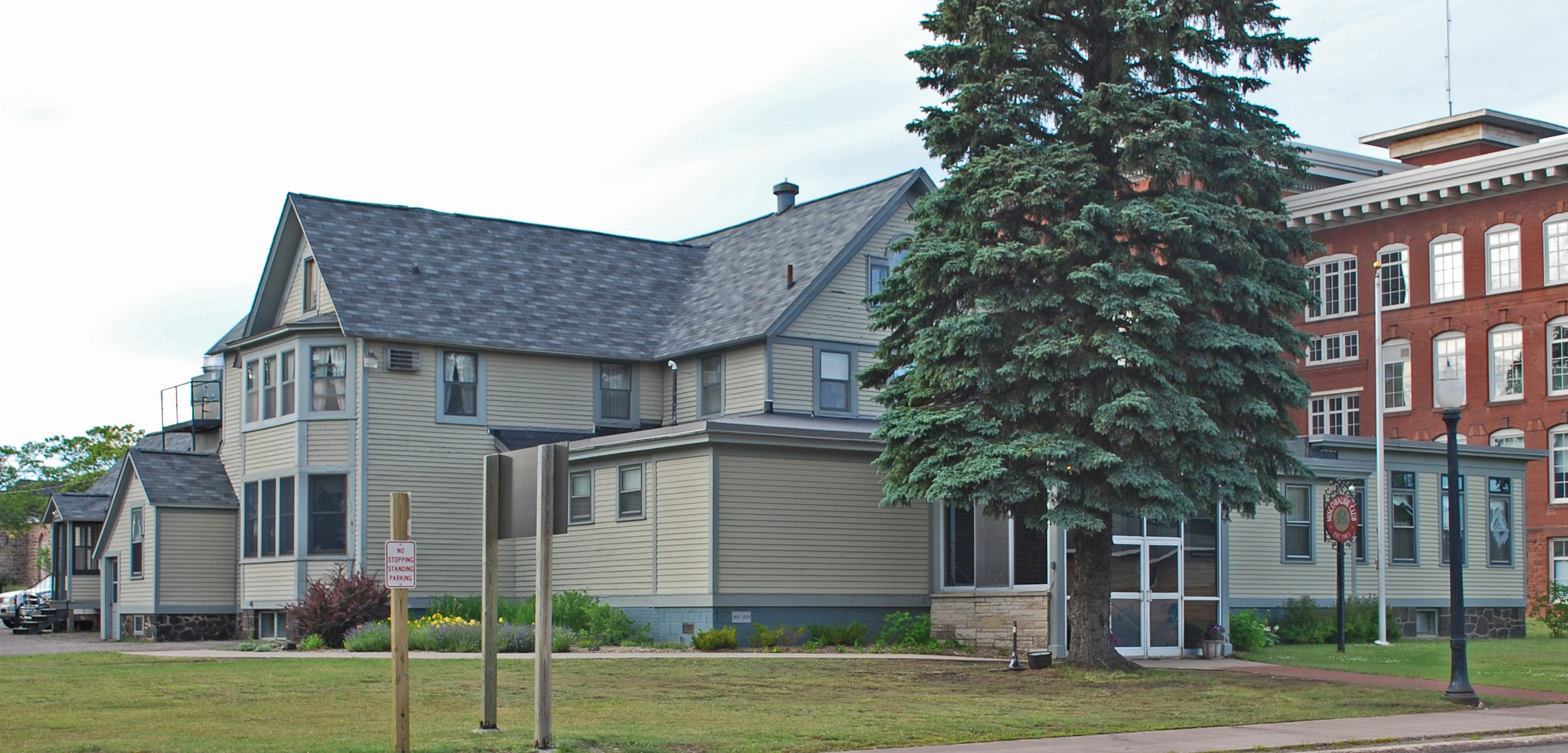
The Miscowaubik Club
- Detroit
  - The Book Club of Detroit (1957)
  - The Detroit Athletic Club (1887)
  - The Detroit Club (1882)
  - The Detroit Racquet Club (1902)
  - The Players (1910)
  - The Yondotega Club (1892)
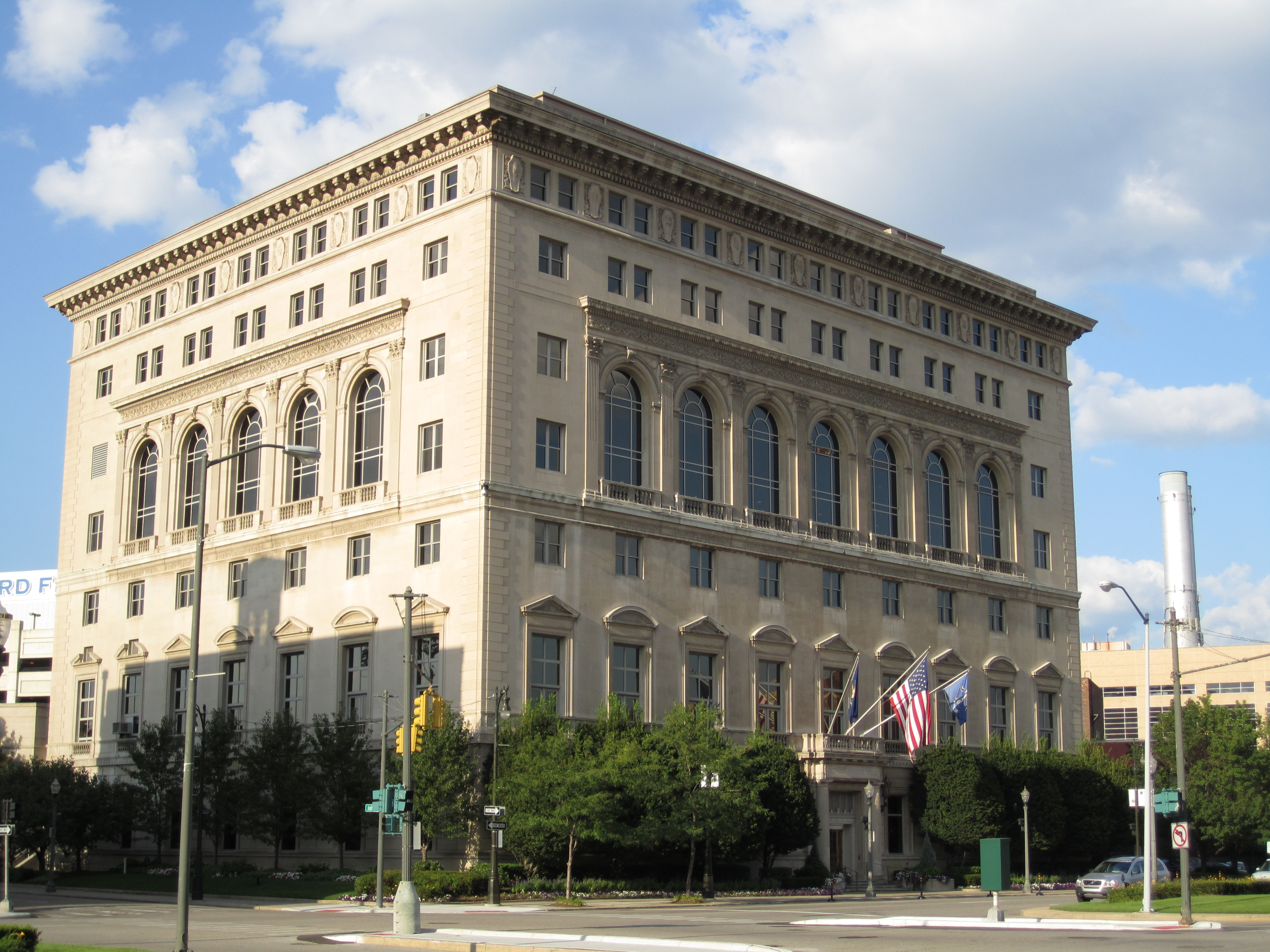
The Detroit Athletic Club

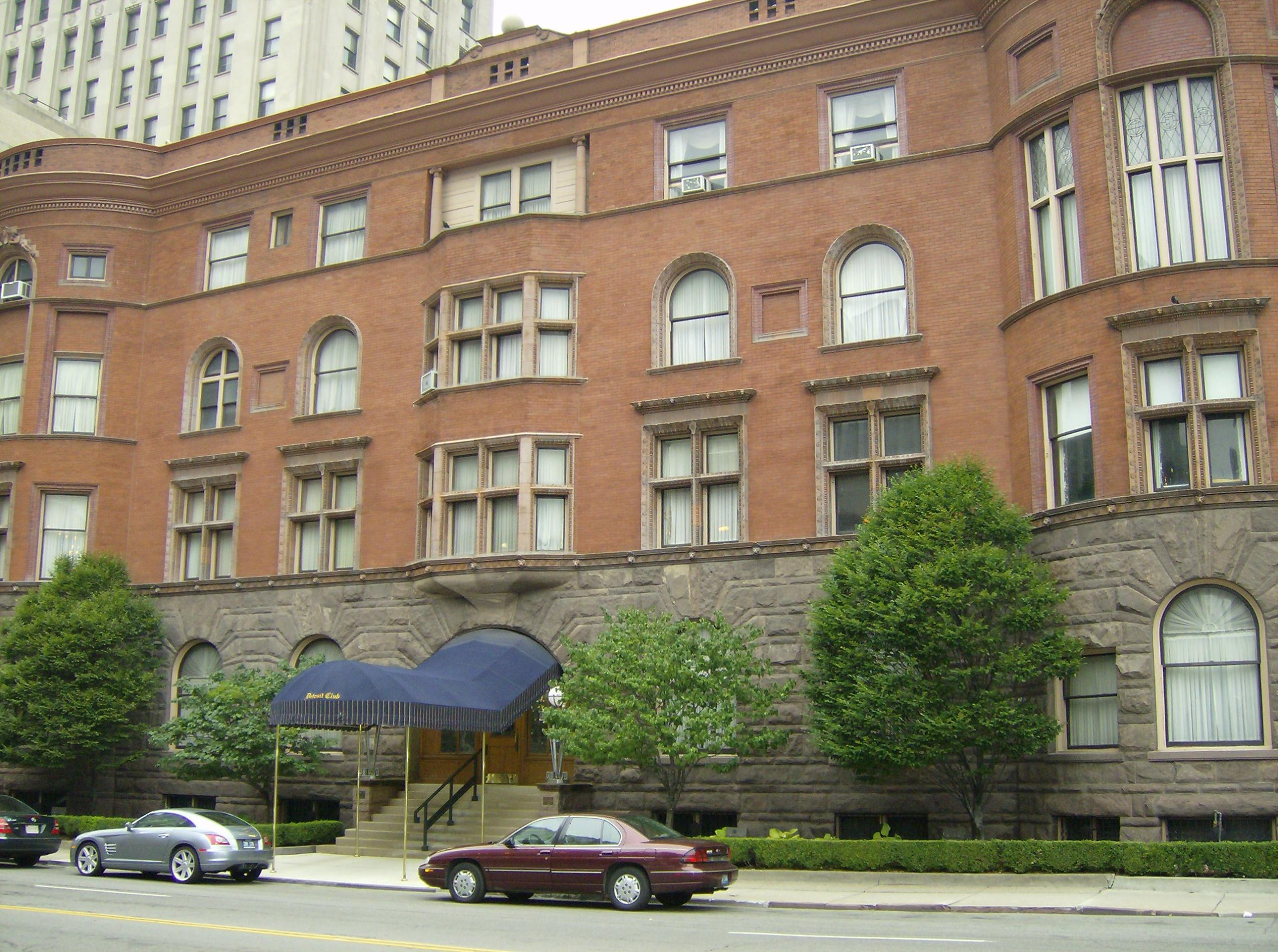
The Detroit Club

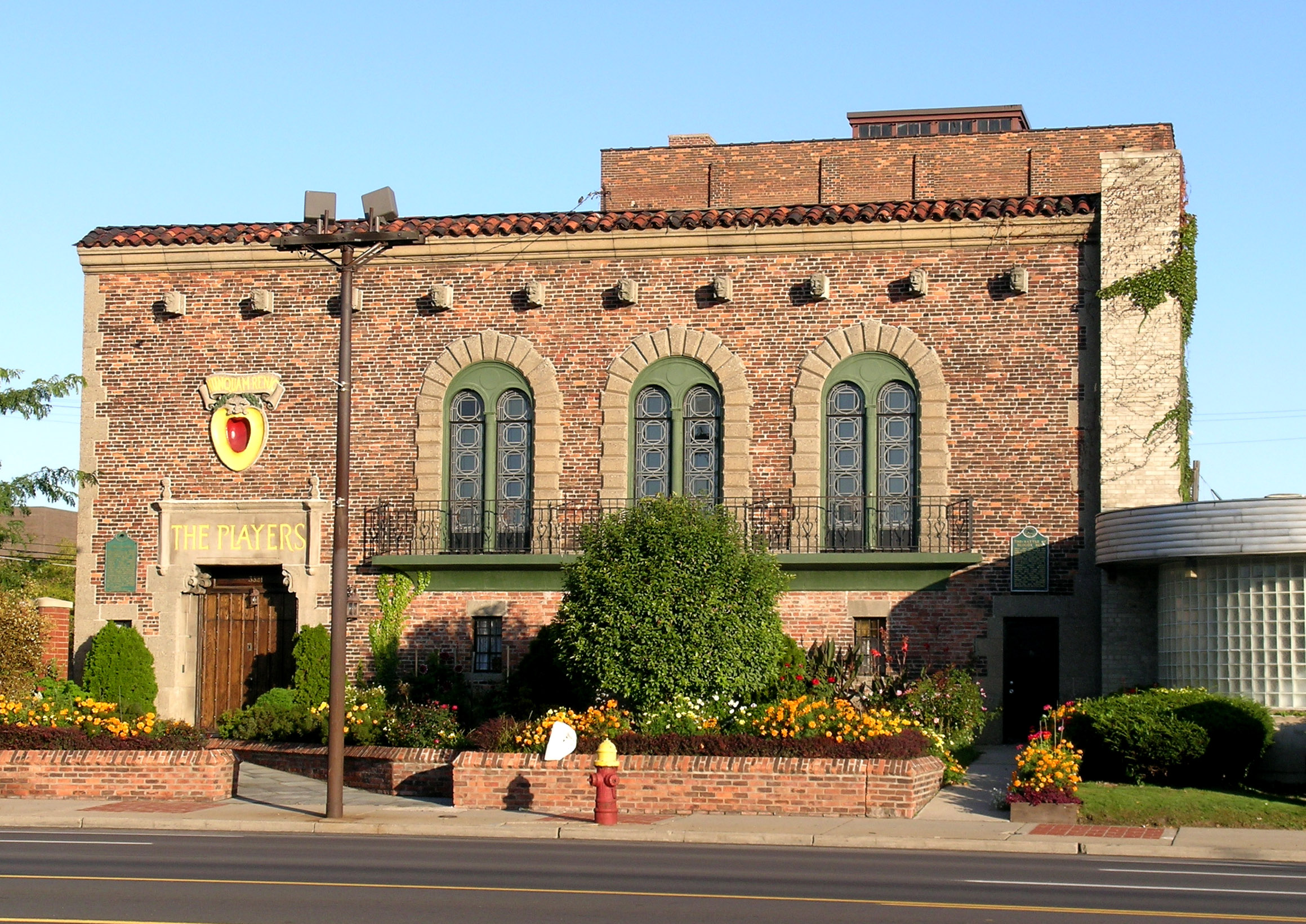
The Players
- East Lansing
  - The University Club of Michigan State University (1962)
- Grand Rapids
  - The University Club of Grand Rapids (1923)
- Iron Mountain
  - The Chippewa Club (1945)
- Kalamazoo
  - The Beacon Club (1947)
  - The Park Club of Kalamazoo(1904)
- Saginaw
  - The Saginaw Club (1889)
- Tecumseh
  - The Tecumseh Club (1863)

=== Minnesota ===
- Duluth
  - Kitchi Gammi Club (1883)
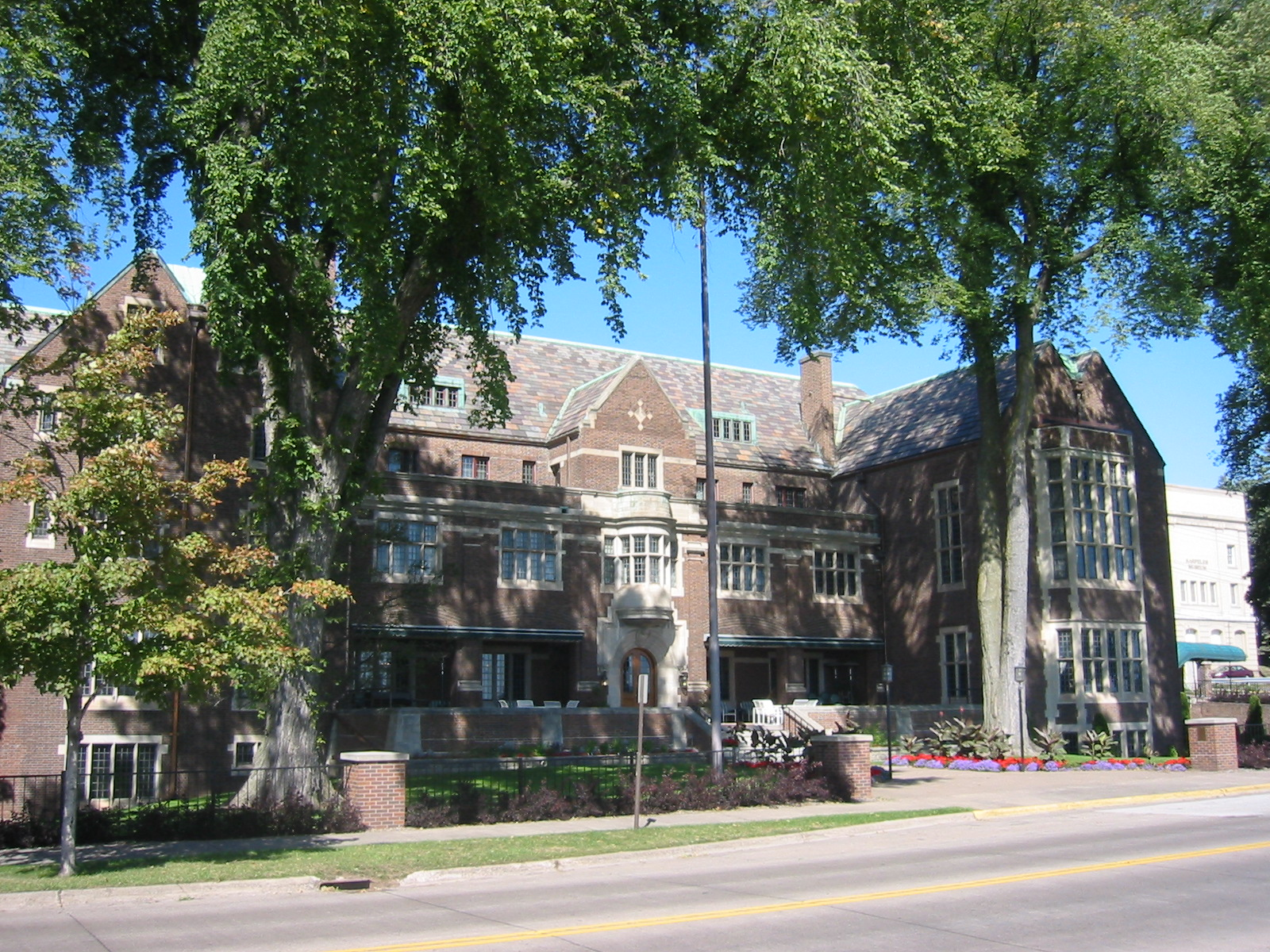
The Kitchi Gammi Club
- Minneapolis
  - The Campus Club (1911)
  - The Minneapolis Club (1883)
- Saint Paul
  - The St. Paul Athletic Club (1917–1991), insolvent
  - The University Club of Saint Paul (1912)
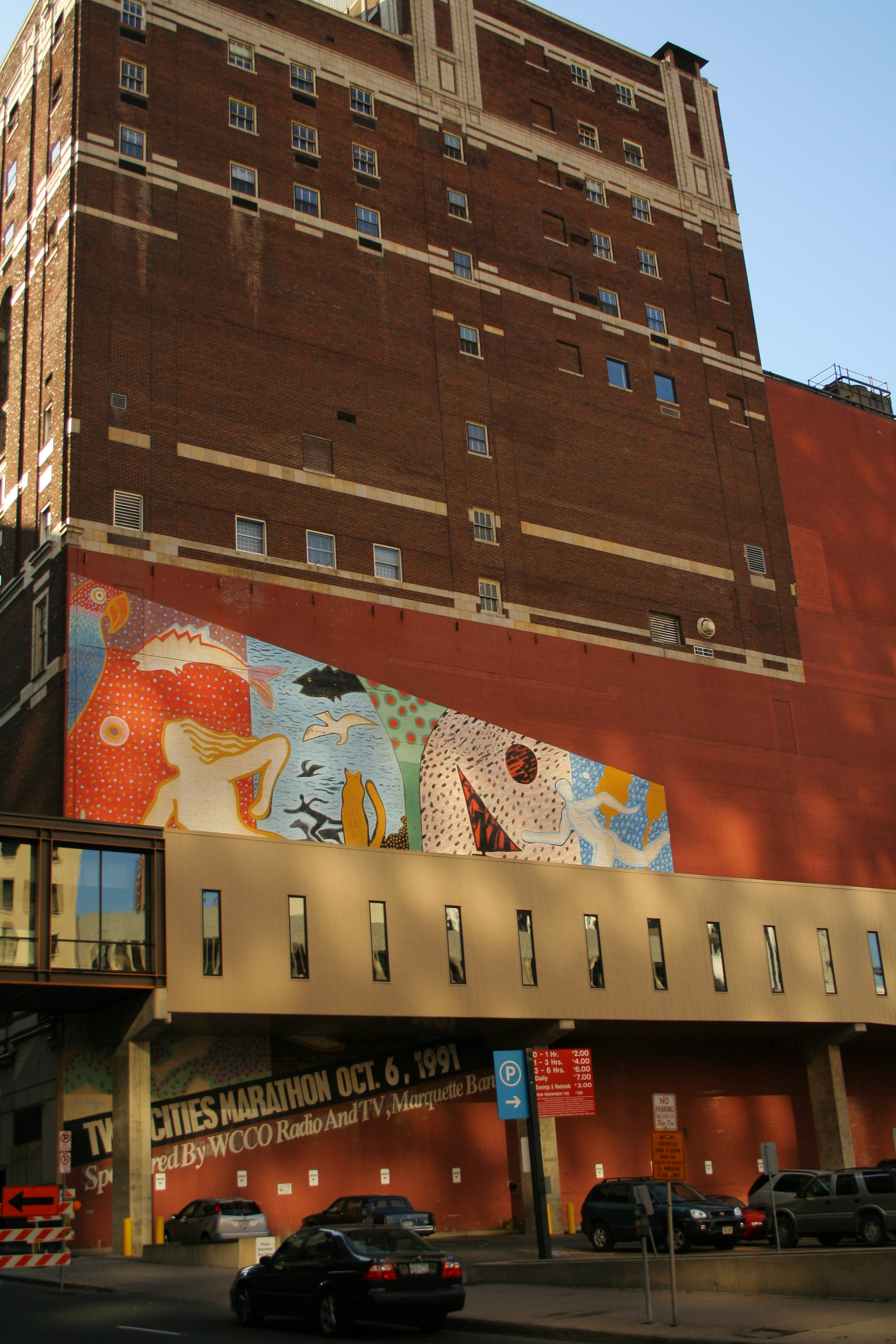
The now-defunct St. Paul Athletic Club

=== Mississippi ===
- Gulfport
  - The Great Southern Club (1988)
- Jackson
  - The Capital Club (1947)

=== Missouri ===
- Clayton
  - The Saint Louis Club (1961)
  - The Whittemore House Club (1969)
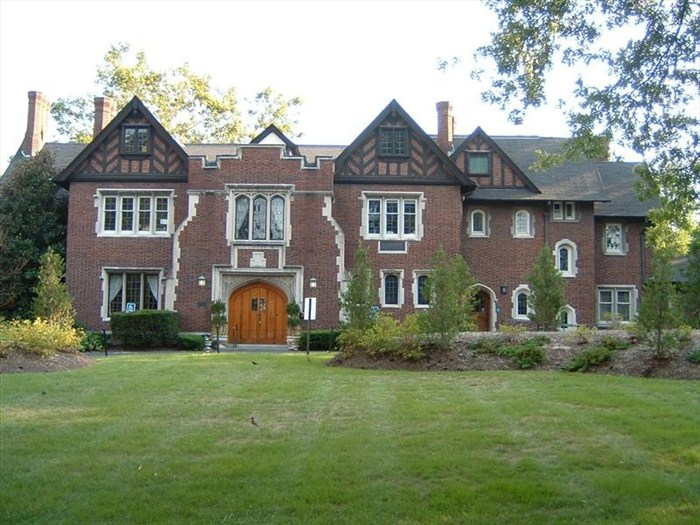
The Whittemore House Club
- Columbia
  - The University Club of Missouri University (1895)
- Kansas City
  - The River Club (1948)
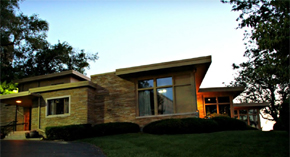
The River Club
- St. Joseph
  - The Benton Club (1887)
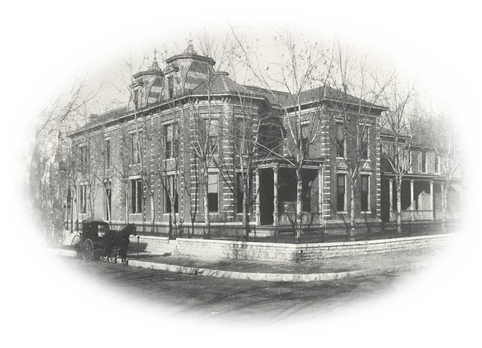
The Benton Club
- St. Louis
  - The Missouri Athletic Club (1903), which awards the Hermann Trophy
  - The Racquet Club of St. Louis (1906), which funded Charles Lindbergh's Spirit of St. Louis
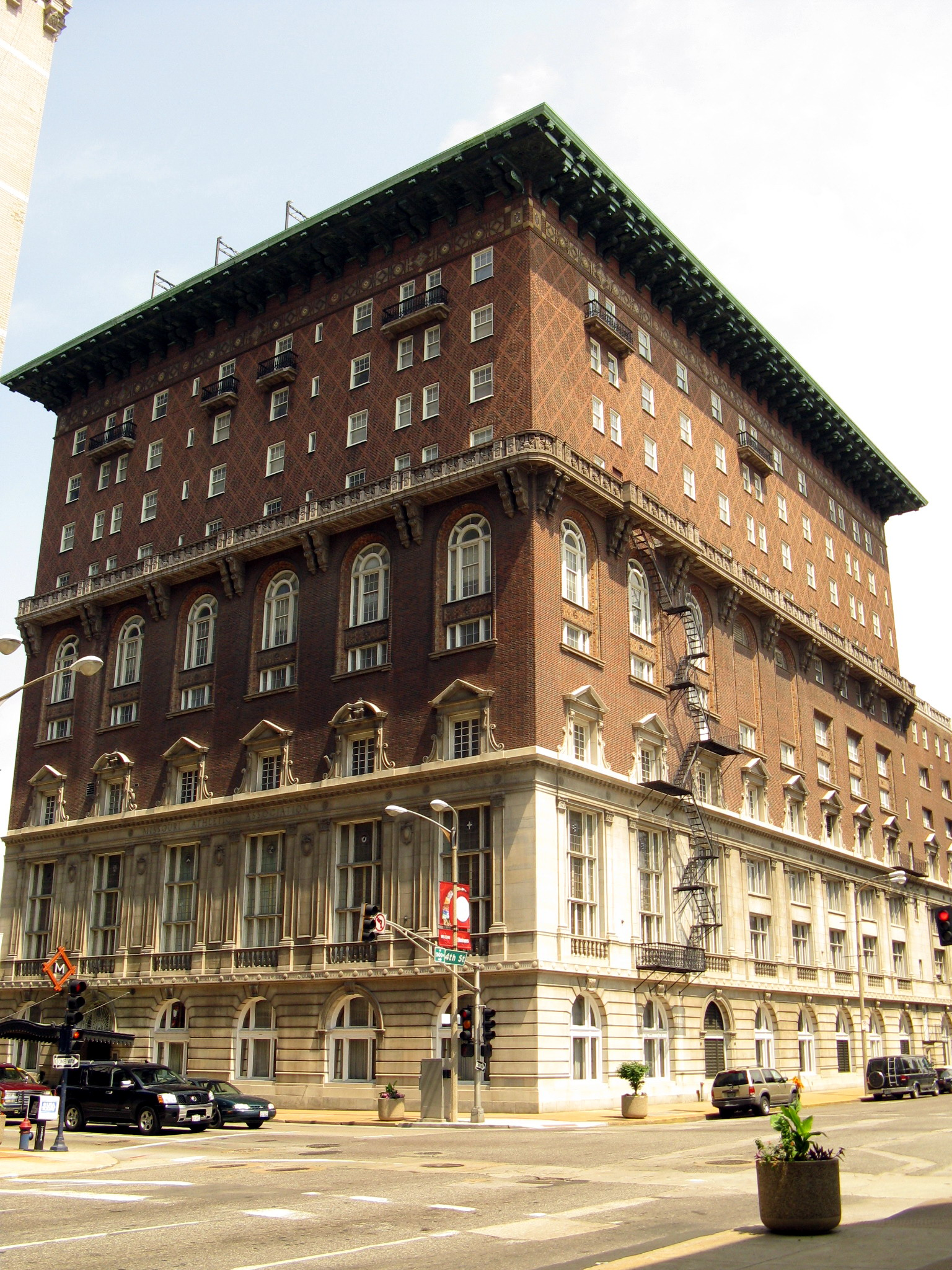
The Missouri Athletic Club

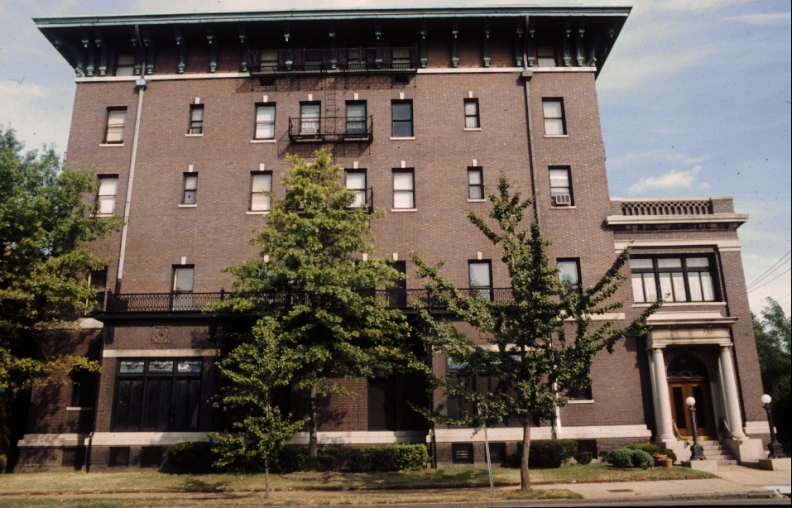
The Racquet Club of St. Louis

=== Montana ===
- Billings
  - The Billings Petroleum Club (1954)

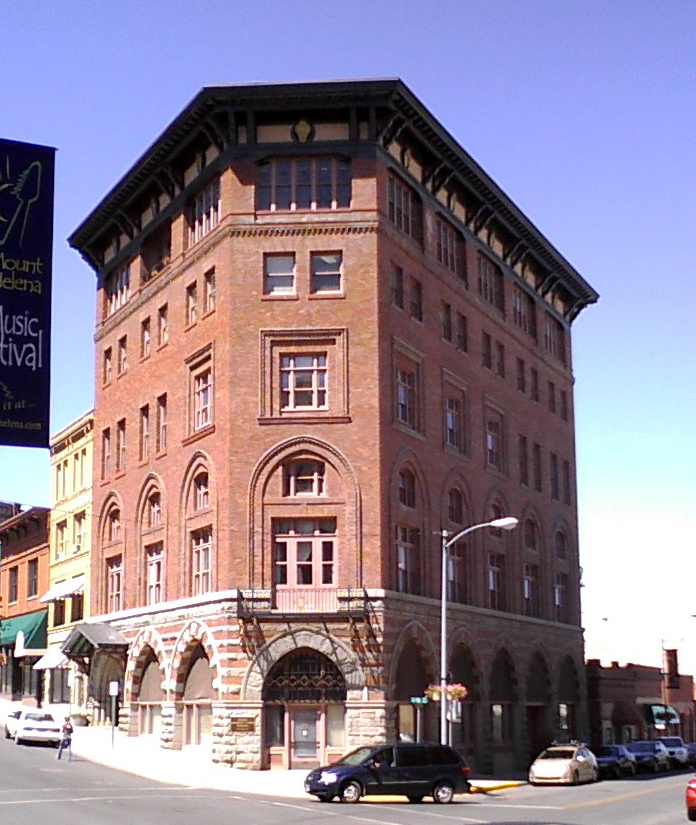
The Montana Club's 1905 building

- Helena
  - Montana Club (1885), Its 1905 new building was designed by noted architect Cass Gilbert with attention to style of traditional London gentlemen's clubs. NRHP-listed within Helena Historic District. Its floor design includes white swastikas.
- Miles City
  - The Miles City Club (1884)

=== Nebraska ===
- Omaha
  - The Omaha Press Club (1955)

=== New Hampshire ===
- Portsmouth
  - The One Hundred Club (2003)
  - The Warwick Club (1892)

=== New Jersey ===
- Florham Park
  - The Park Avenue Club (1894)
- Montclair
  - The Commonwealth Club (1904)
- Morristown
  - The Morristown Club (1884)
- New Brunswick
  - The Rutgers Club (1957)
- Princeton
  - The Nassau Club (1889)
  - The Prospect House Club (1968)
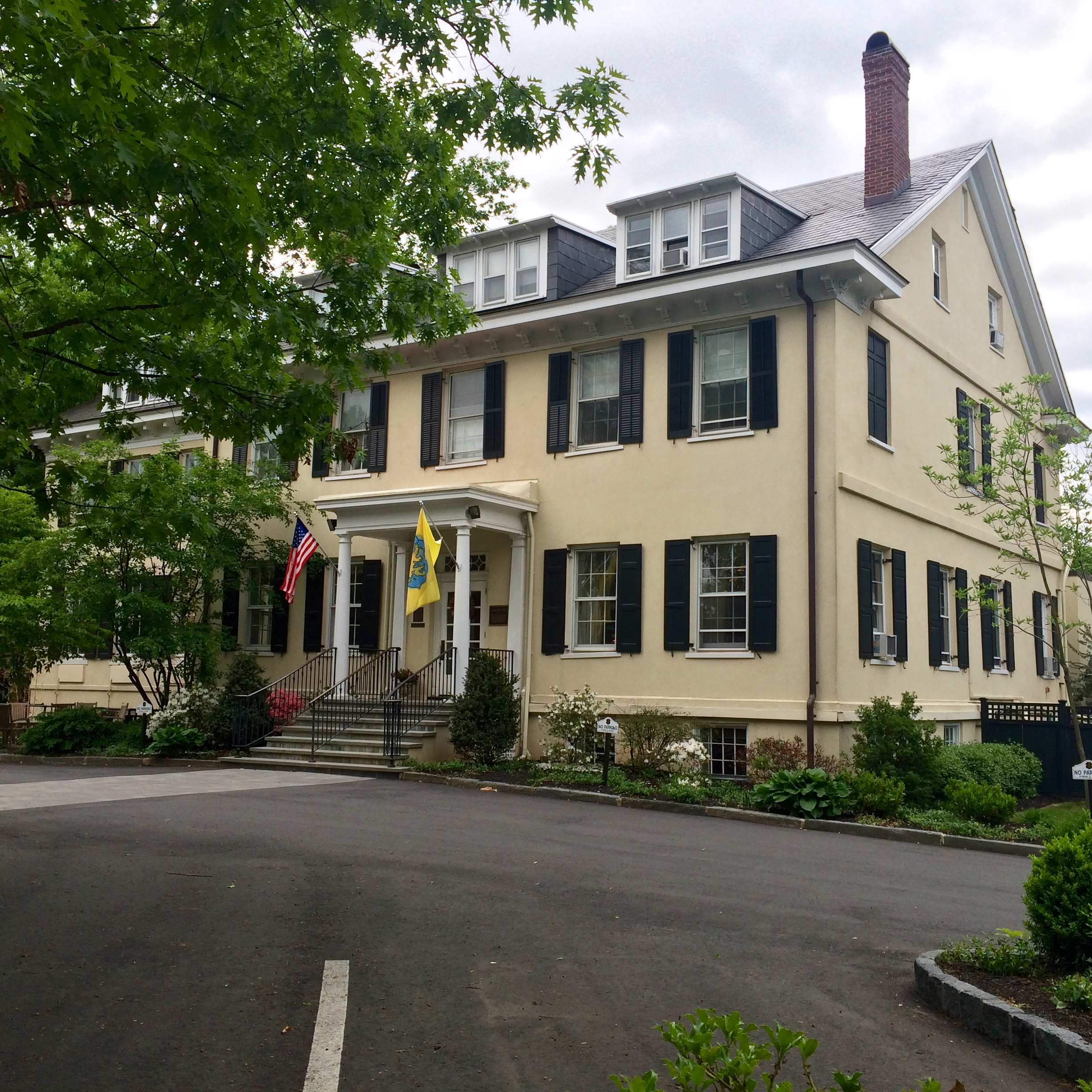
The Nassau Club

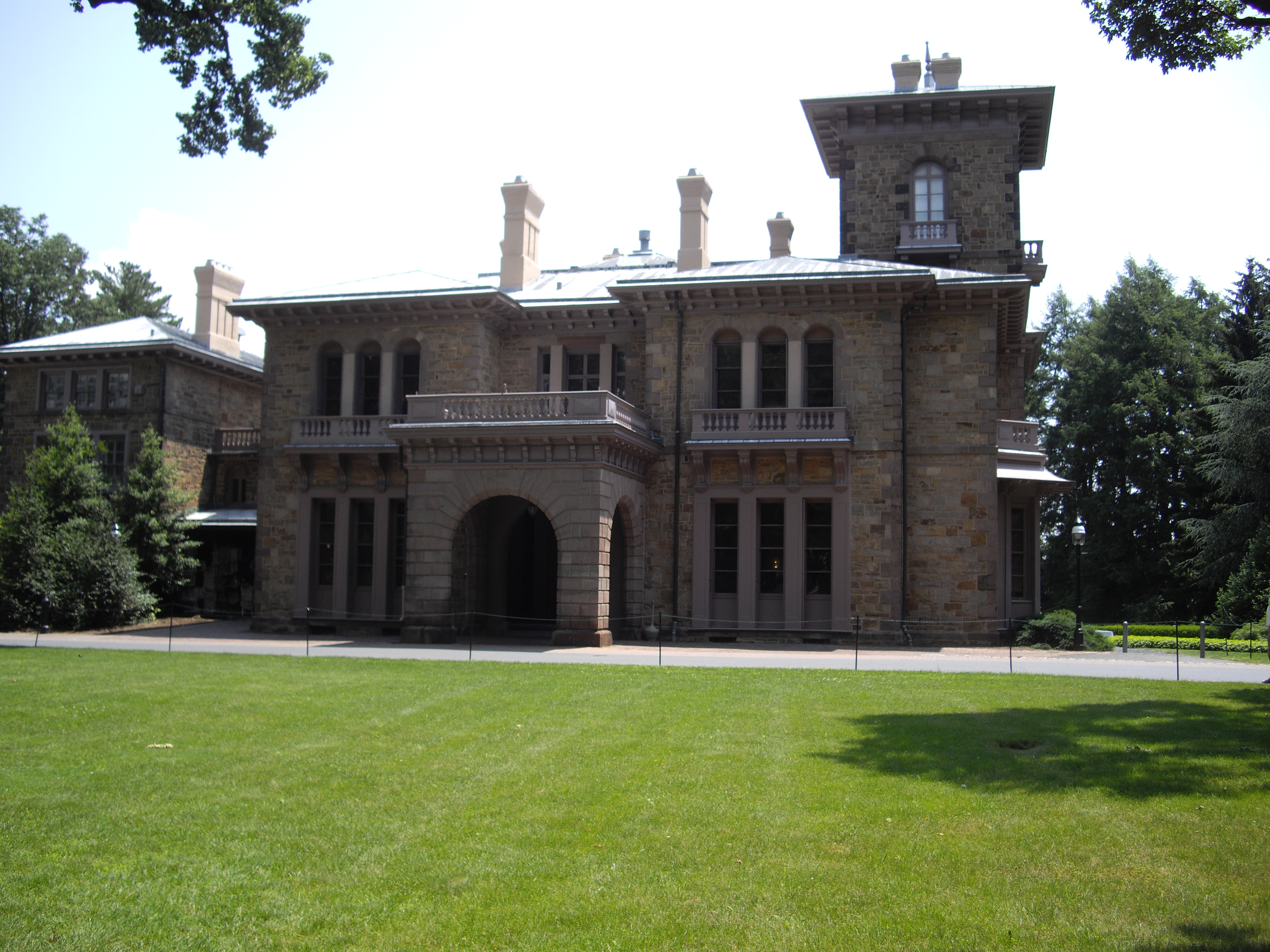
The Prospect House Club

=== New Mexico ===
- Albuquerque
  - The Albuquerque Press Club (1965)

=== New York ===
- Albany
  - The Fort Orange Club (1880)
- Binghamton
  - The Binghamton Club (1880)
- Buffalo
  - The Buffalo Club (1867)
  - The Saturn Club (1885)
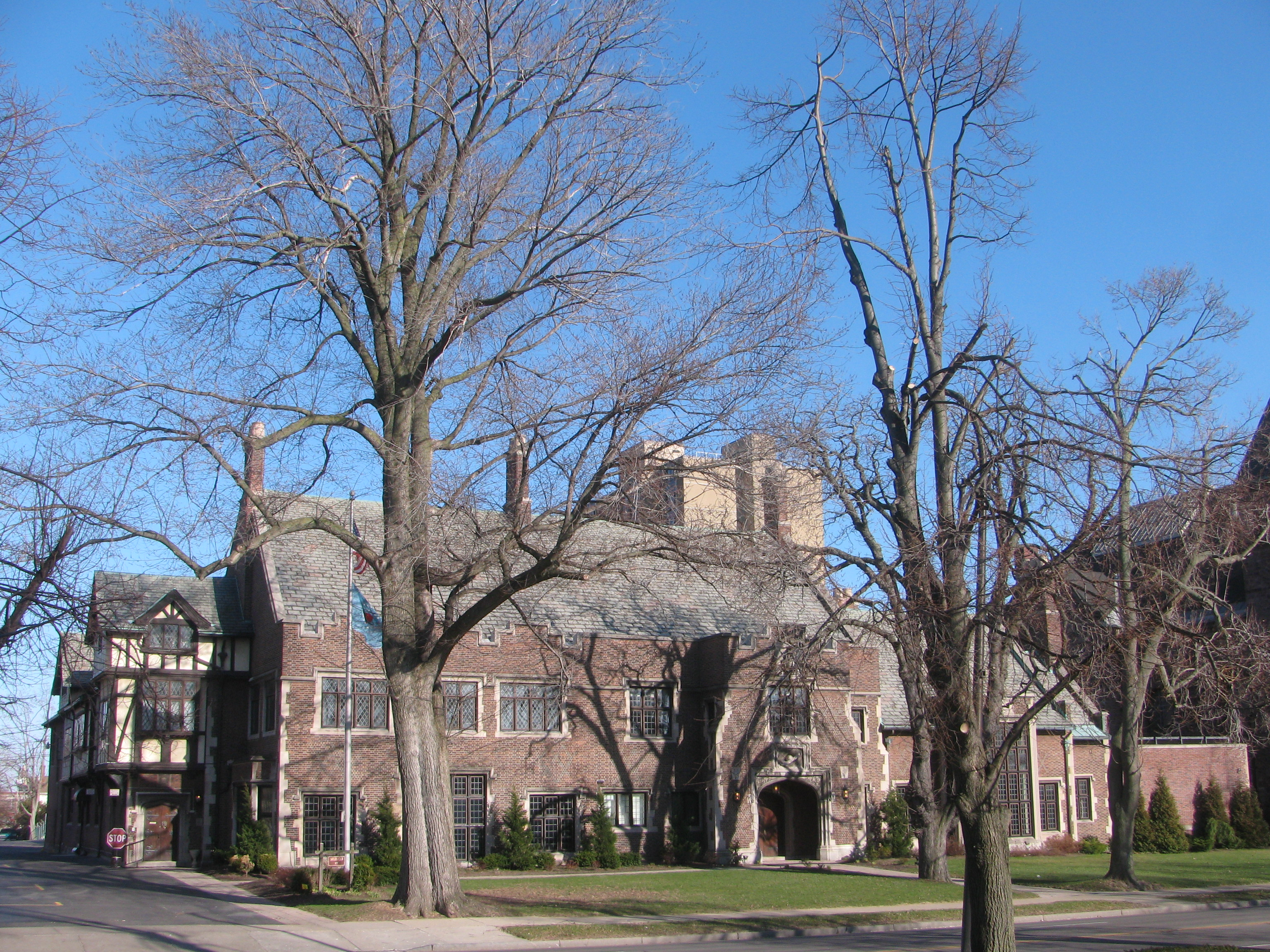
The Saturn Club

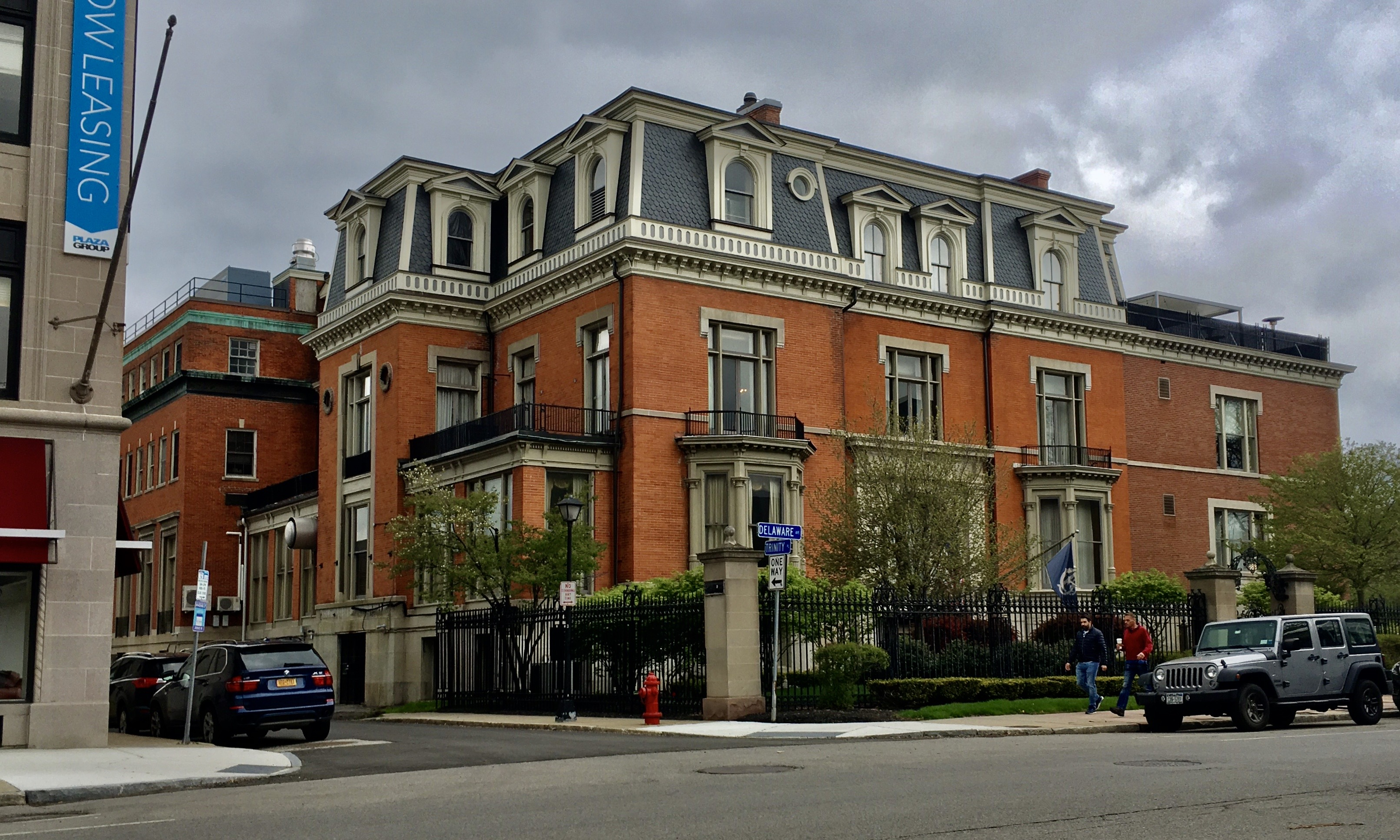
The Buffalo Club
- Elmira
  - The Elmira City Club (1889)
- Jamestown
  - The Jamestown Town Club (1929)
- New York City
  - Clubs affiliated with university alumni groups:
    - The Cornell Club of New York (1889)
    - The Harvard Club of New York City (1887)
    - The Penn Club of New York City (1901) and clubs in-residence
      - Columbia University Club of New York (lost clubhouse in 1973)
      - The Williams Club (lost clubhouse in 2010)
    - The Yale Club of New York City (1897), the largest private club in the world, which awarded the Heisman Trophy in 2002 and 2003
  - The Brook (1903)
  - The Century Association (1847)
  - The Coffee House Club (1914)
  - The Chemists' Club (1898–1970), lost clubhouse, continues to exist as an "inner club" of the Penn Club of New York City
  - The Collectors Club of New York (1896)
  - The Down Town Association (1859)
  - The Explorers Club (1904)
  - The Grolier Club (1884)
  - The Harmonie Club (1852)
  - The Knickerbocker Club (1871)
  - The Lambs (1874)
  - The Leash (1925)
  - The Links (1921)
  - The Lotos Club (1870)
  - The Metropolitan Club (1891)
  - The Montauk Club (1891) Brooklyn
  - The National Arts Club (1898)
  - The New York Athletic Club (1868)
  - The New York Yacht Club (1844)
  - The Nippon Club (1905)
  - The Norwood Club (2007)
  - The Players (1888)
  - The Racquet and Tennis Club (1876)
  - The River Club of New York (1929)
  - The Salmagundi Club (1871)
  - The Spanish Benevolent Society (1868)
  - The Squadron A Association (1884–1941), lost clubhouse, continues to exist as an "inner club" of the Women's National Republican Club
  - The Union Club (1836), second oldest existing gentlemen's city club in the United States behind The Philadelphia Club
  - The Union League Club of New York (1863)
  - The University Club of New York (1865)
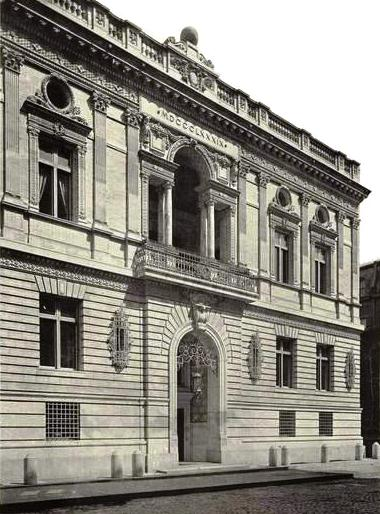
The Century Association

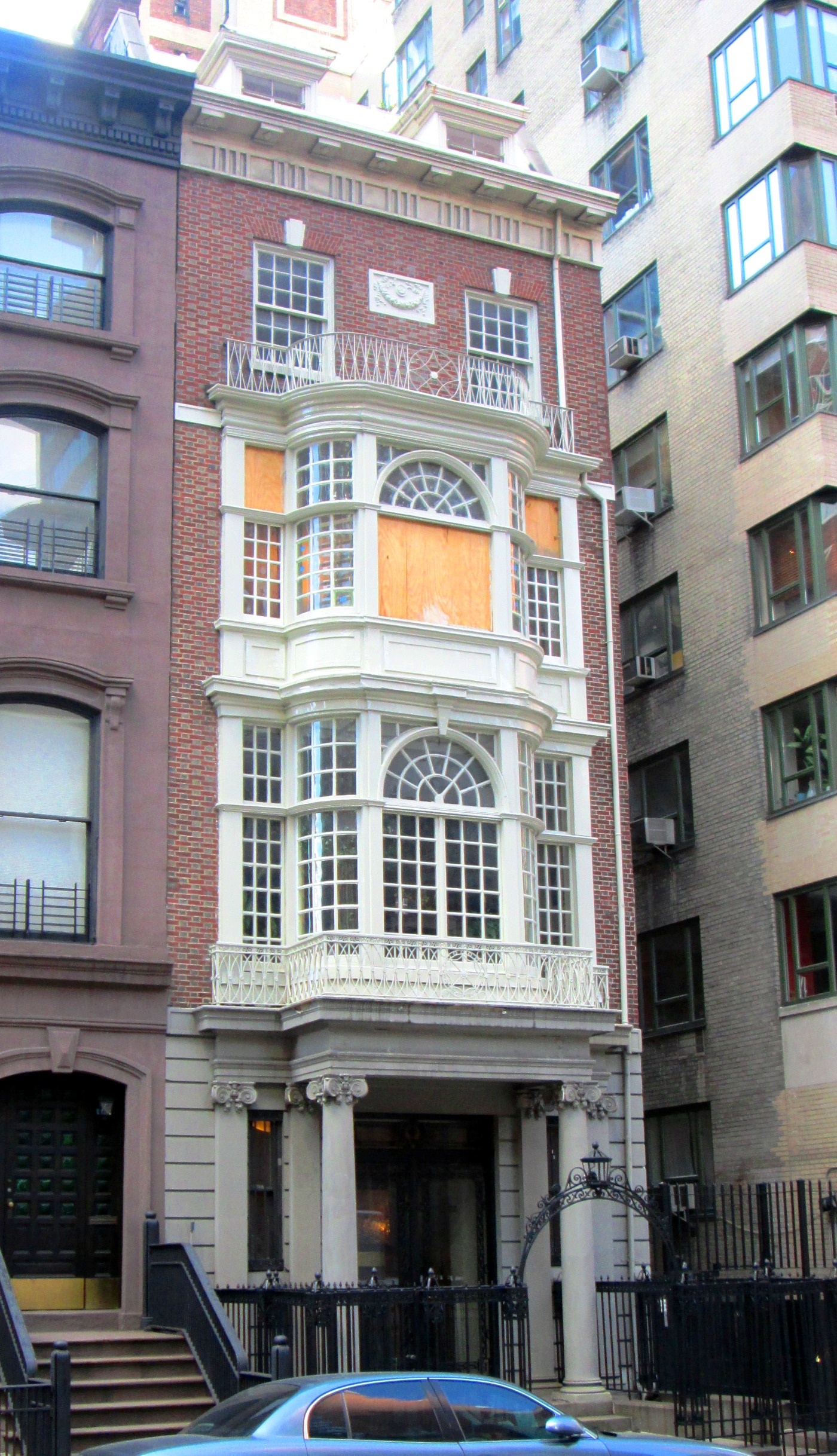
The Collectors Club of New York

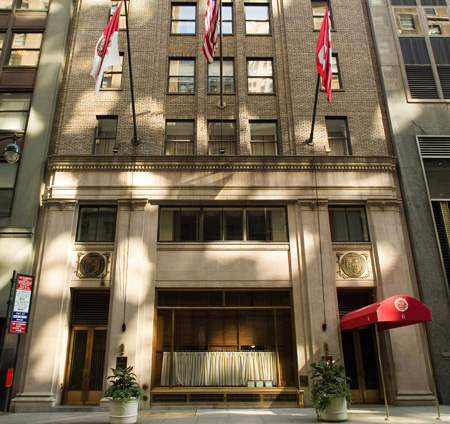
The Cornell Club of New York

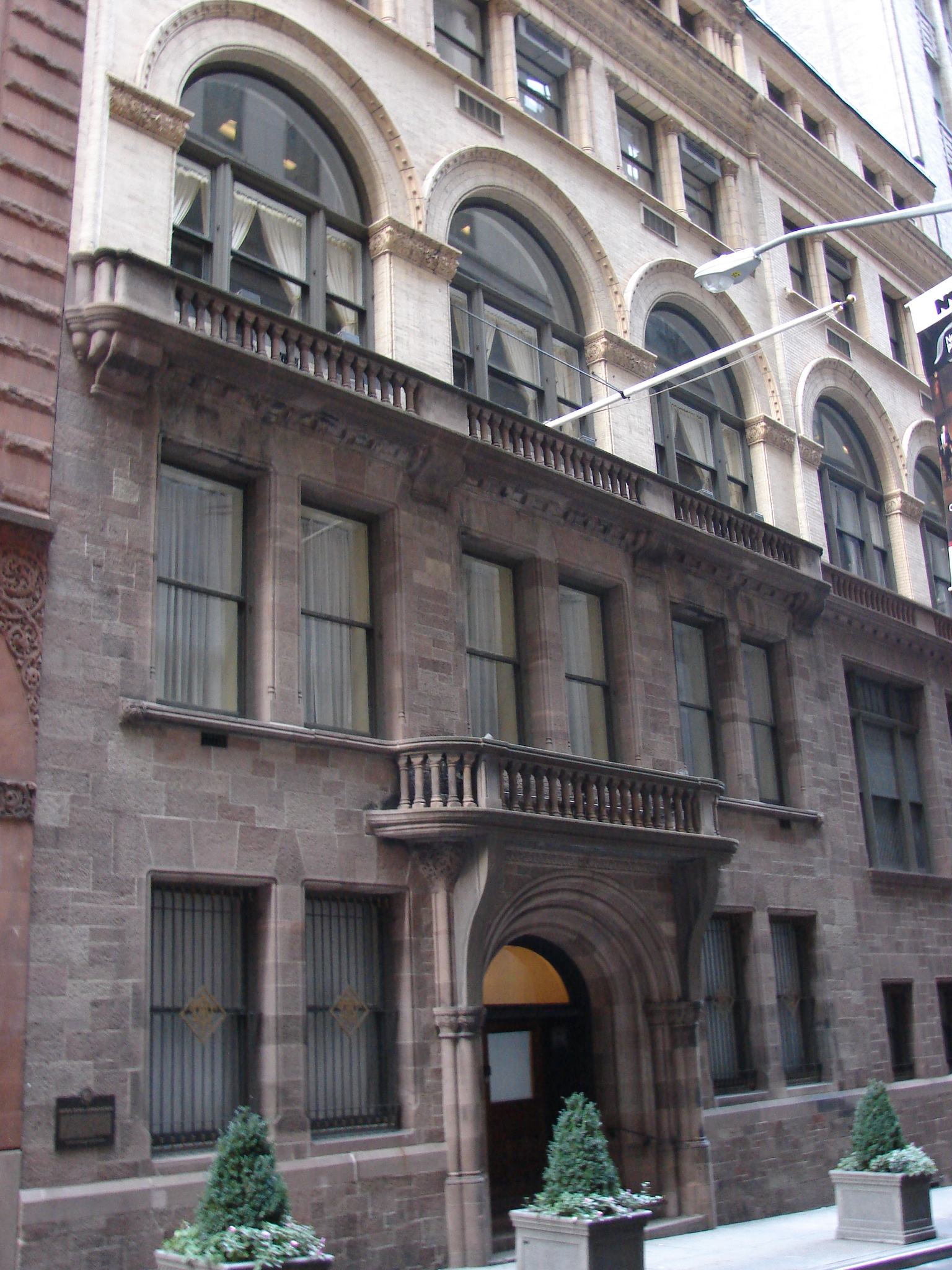
The Down Town Association

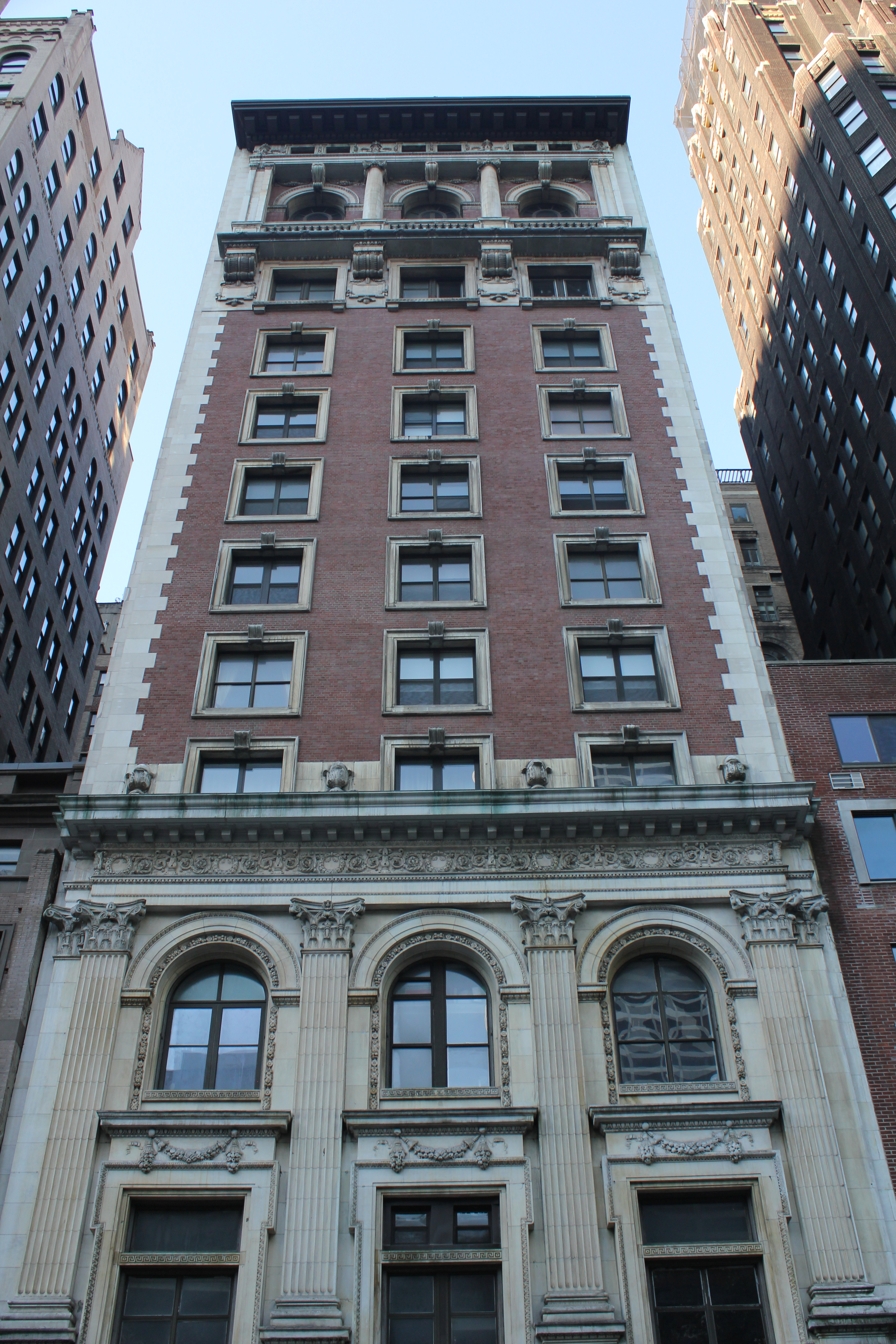
The Engineers' Club Building (1907–1979)

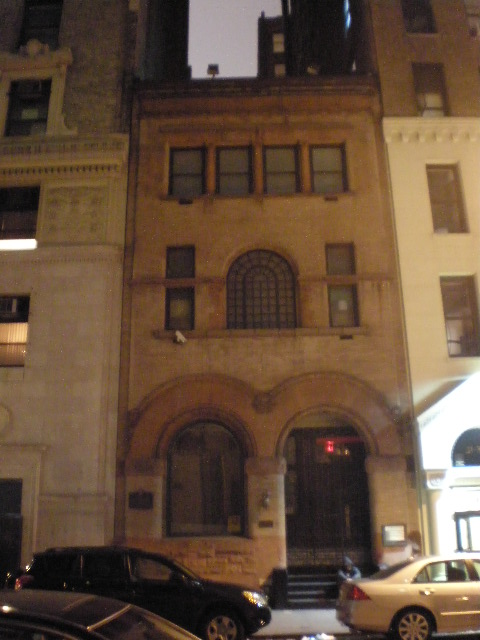
The Grolier Club (1890–1937)

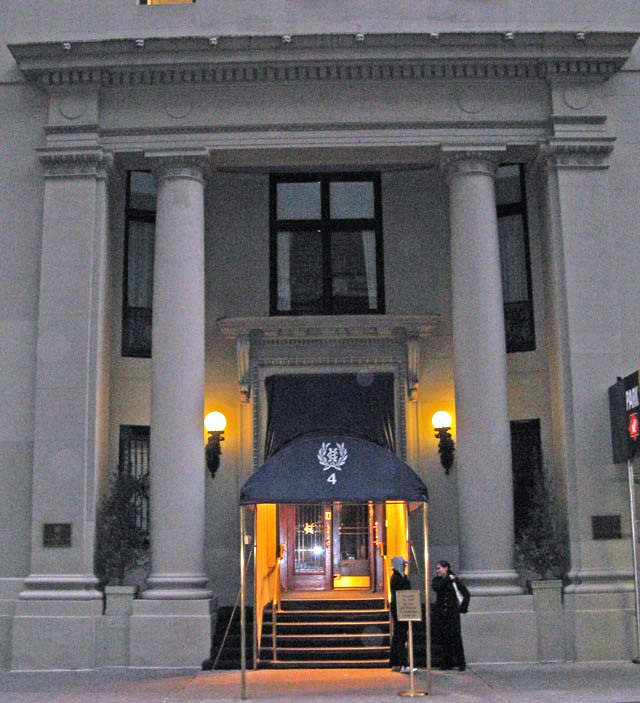
The Harmonie Club

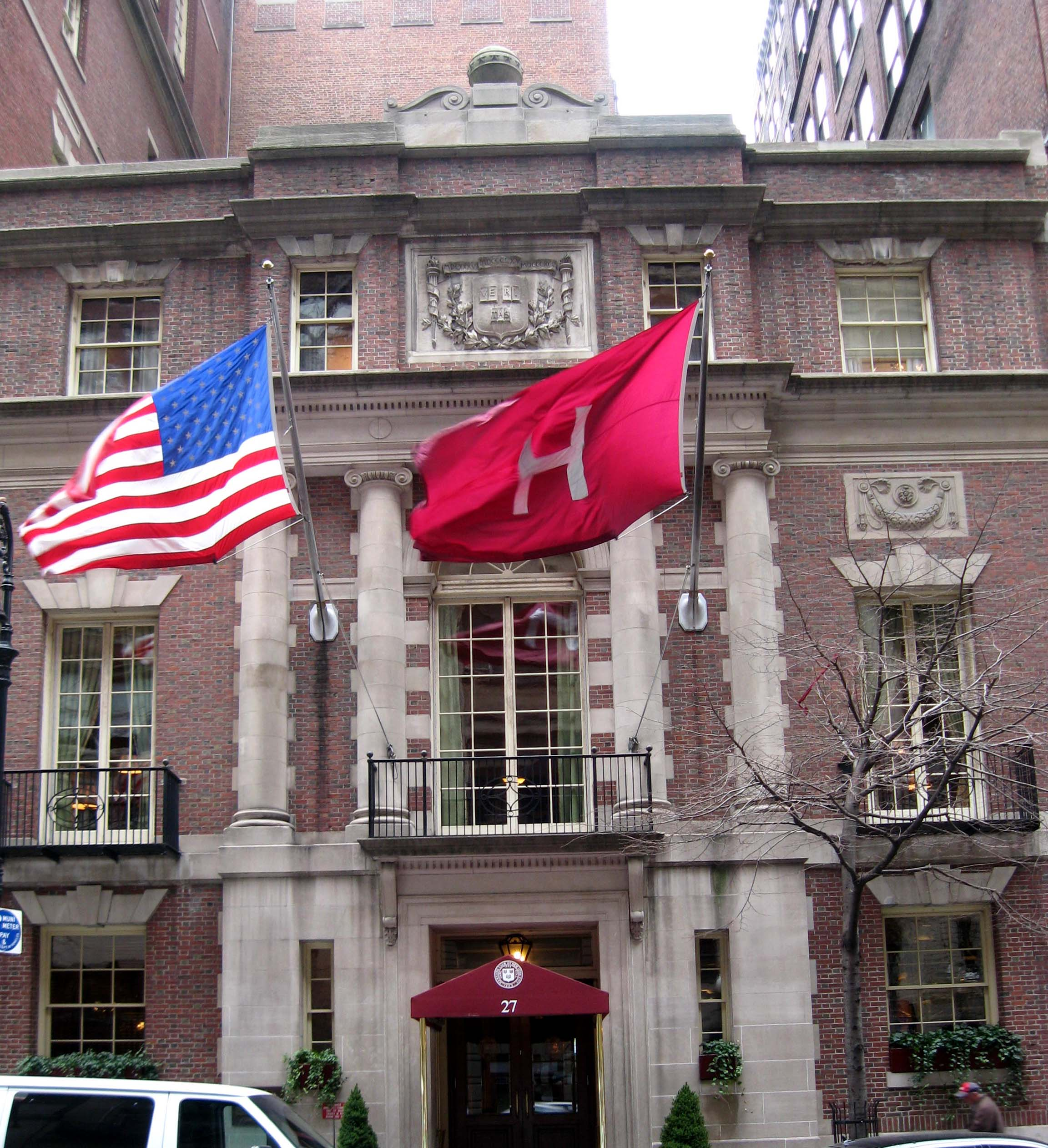
The Harvard Club of New York City

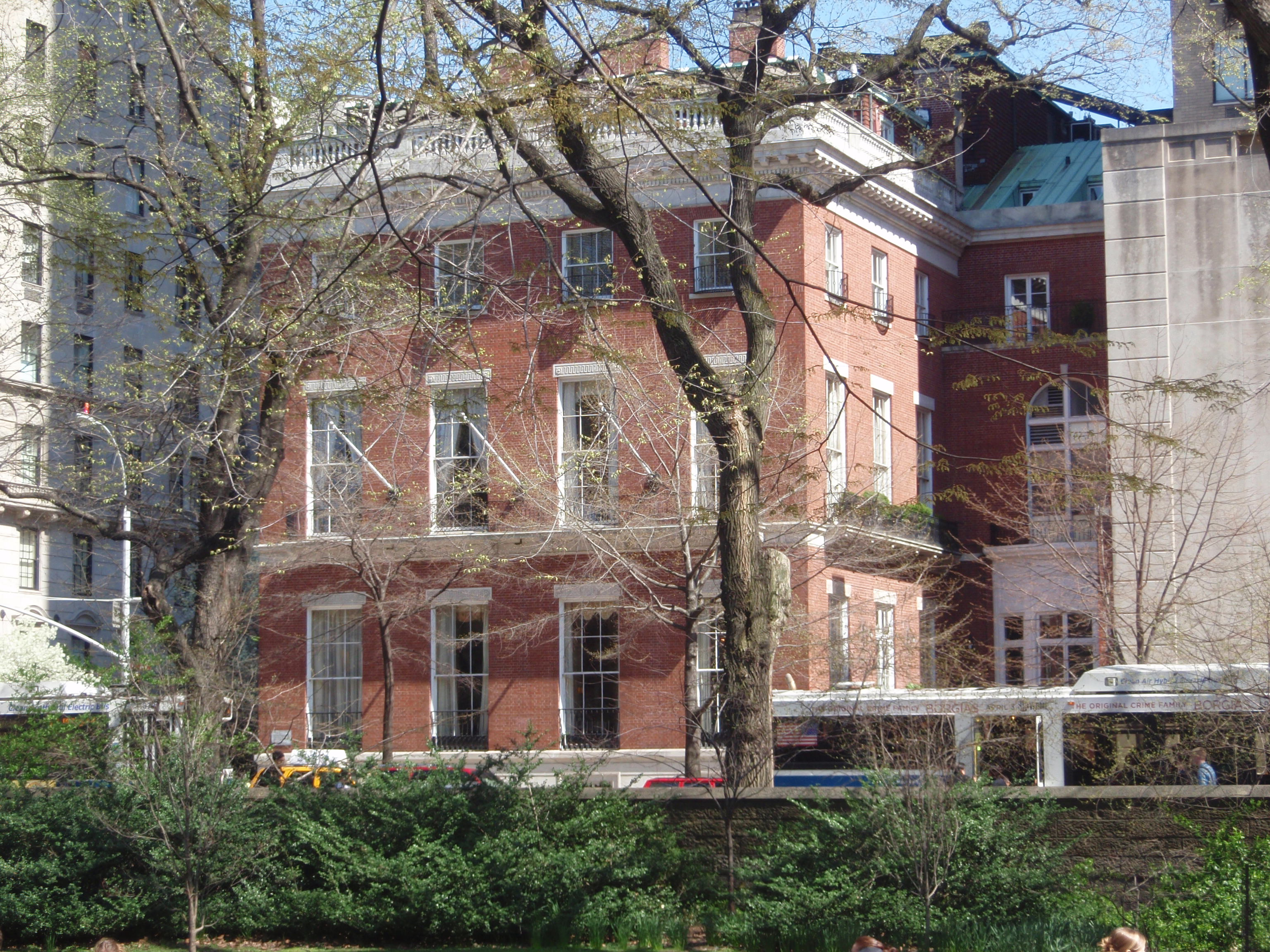
The Knickerbocker Club

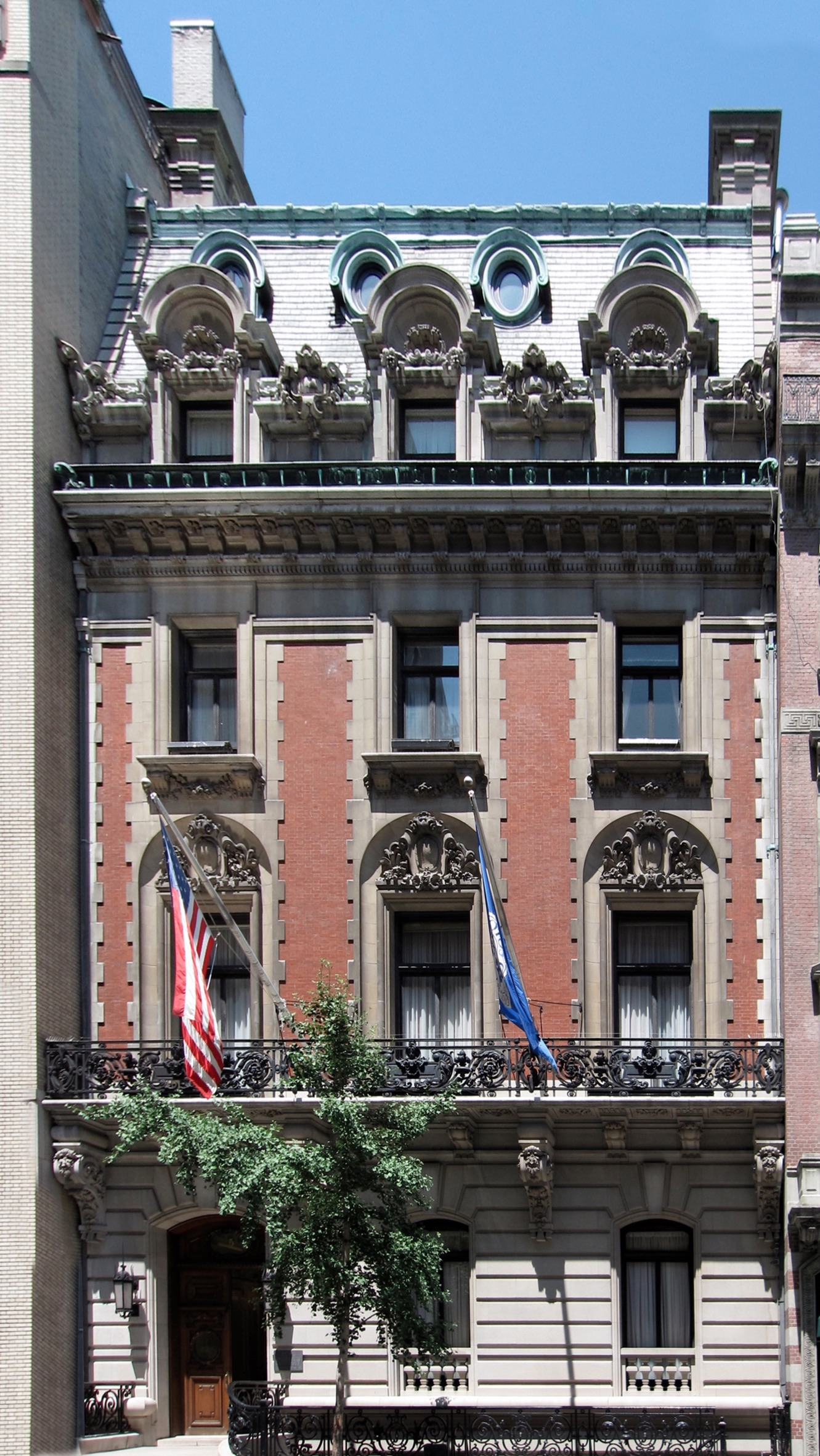
The Lotos Club

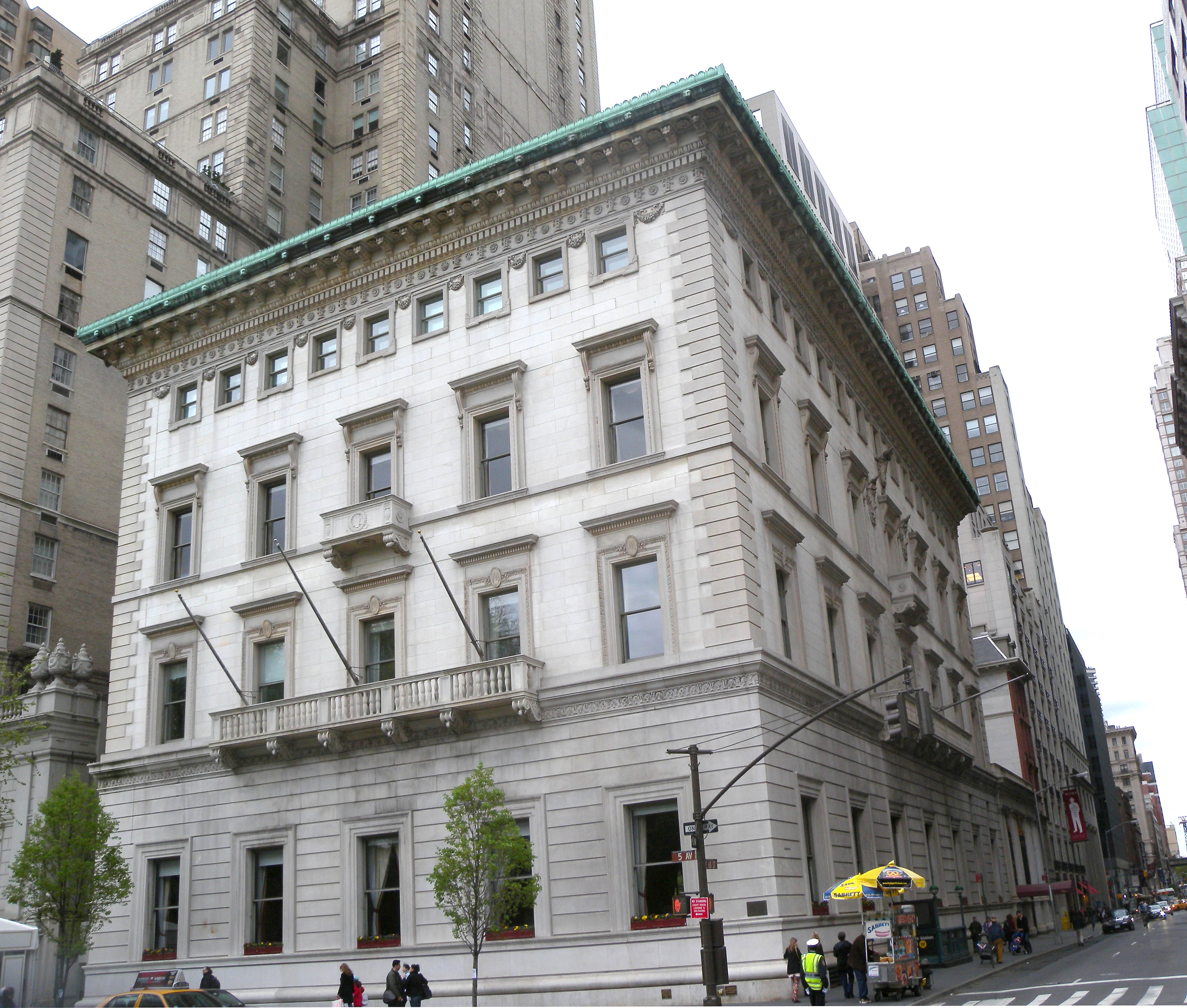
The Metropolitan Club

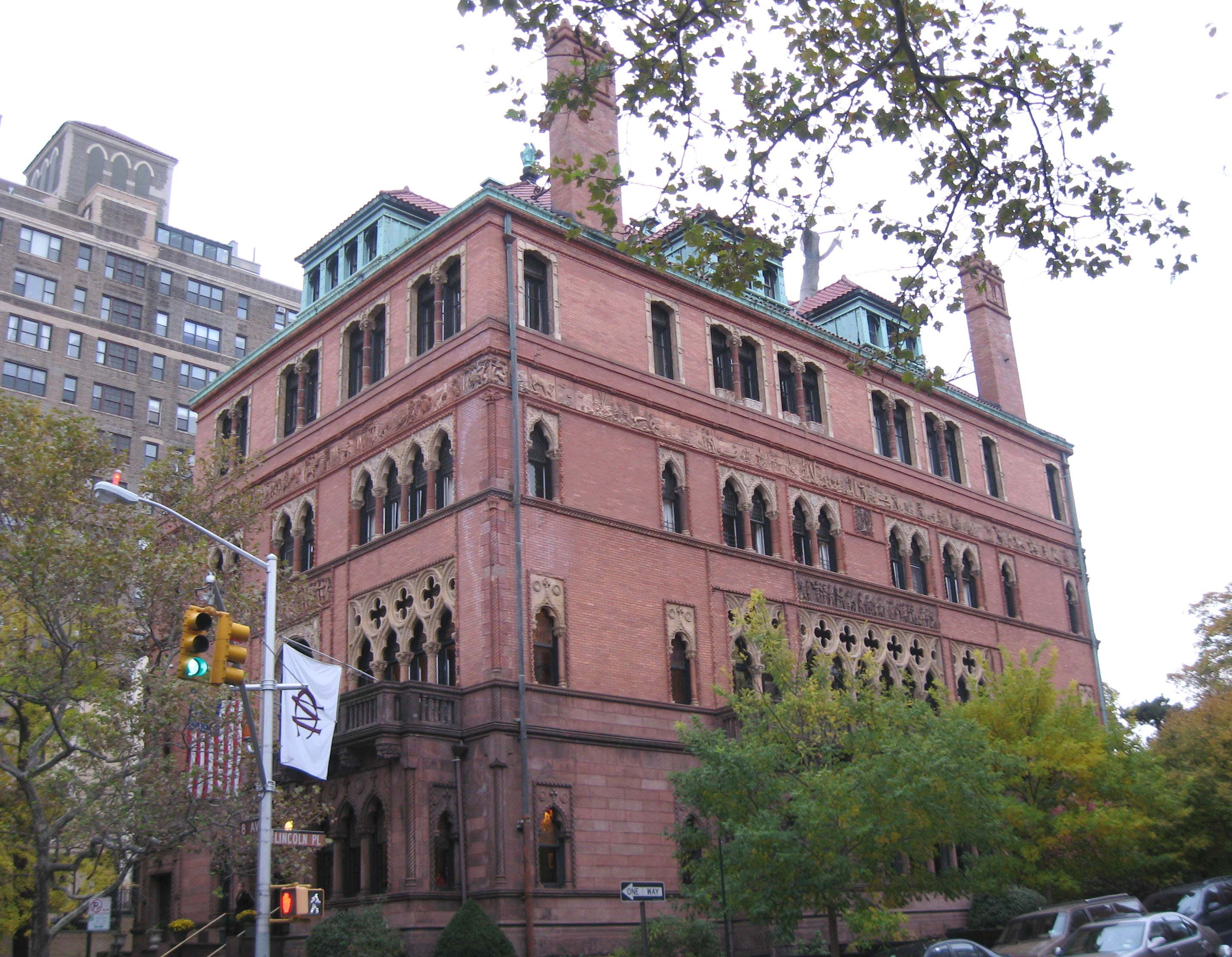
The Montauk Club

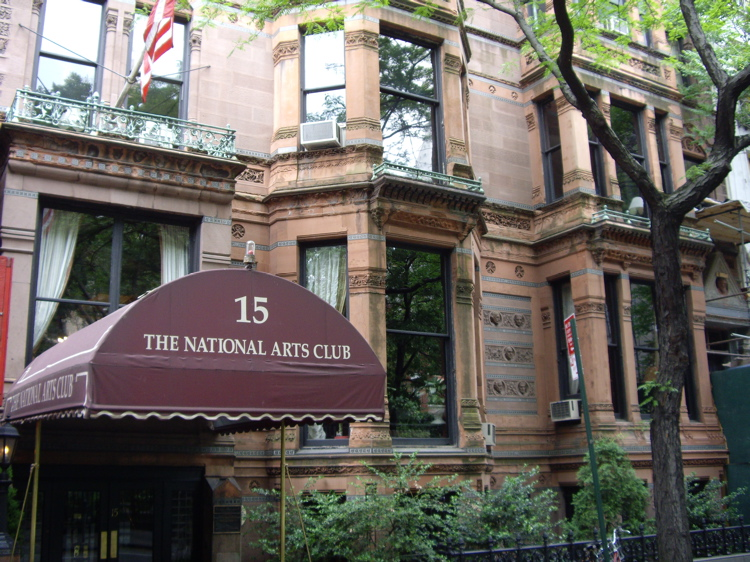
The National Arts Club

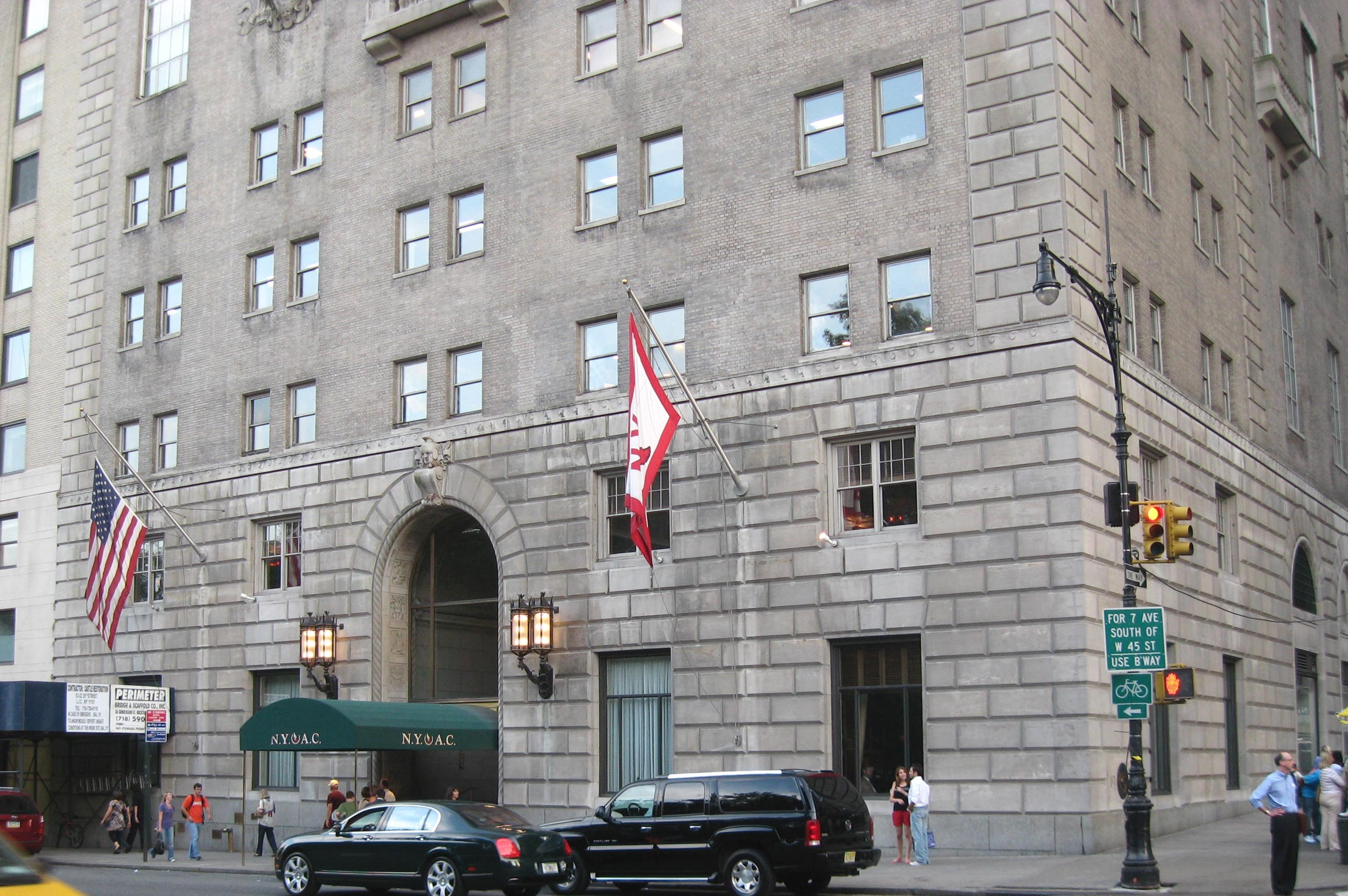
The New York Athletic Club

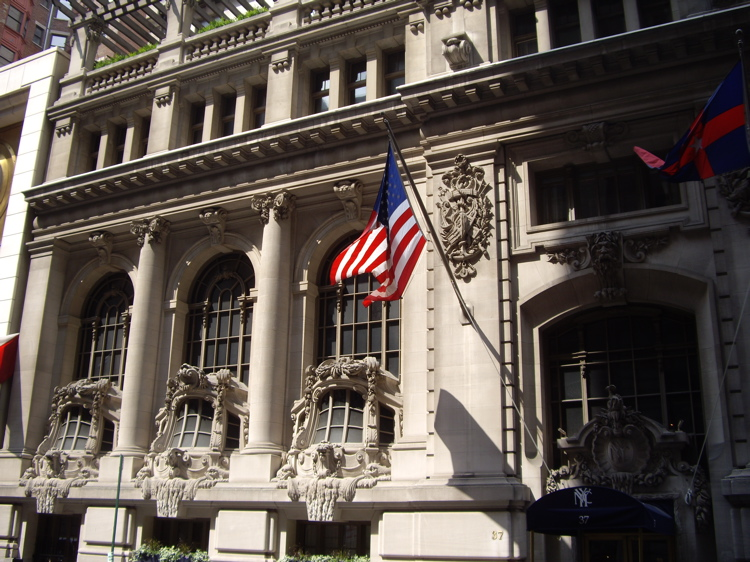
The New York Yacht Club

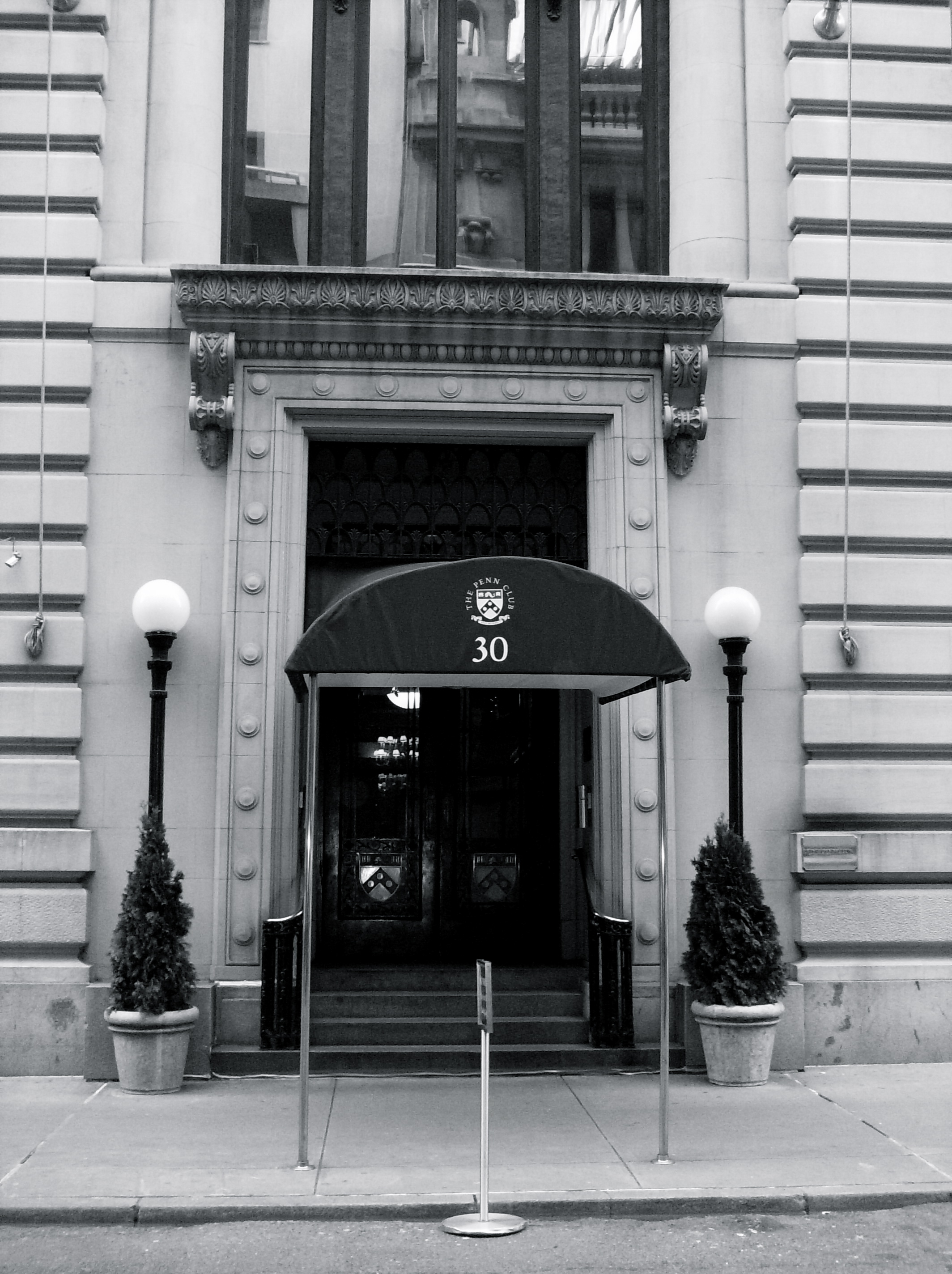
The Penn Club of New York City

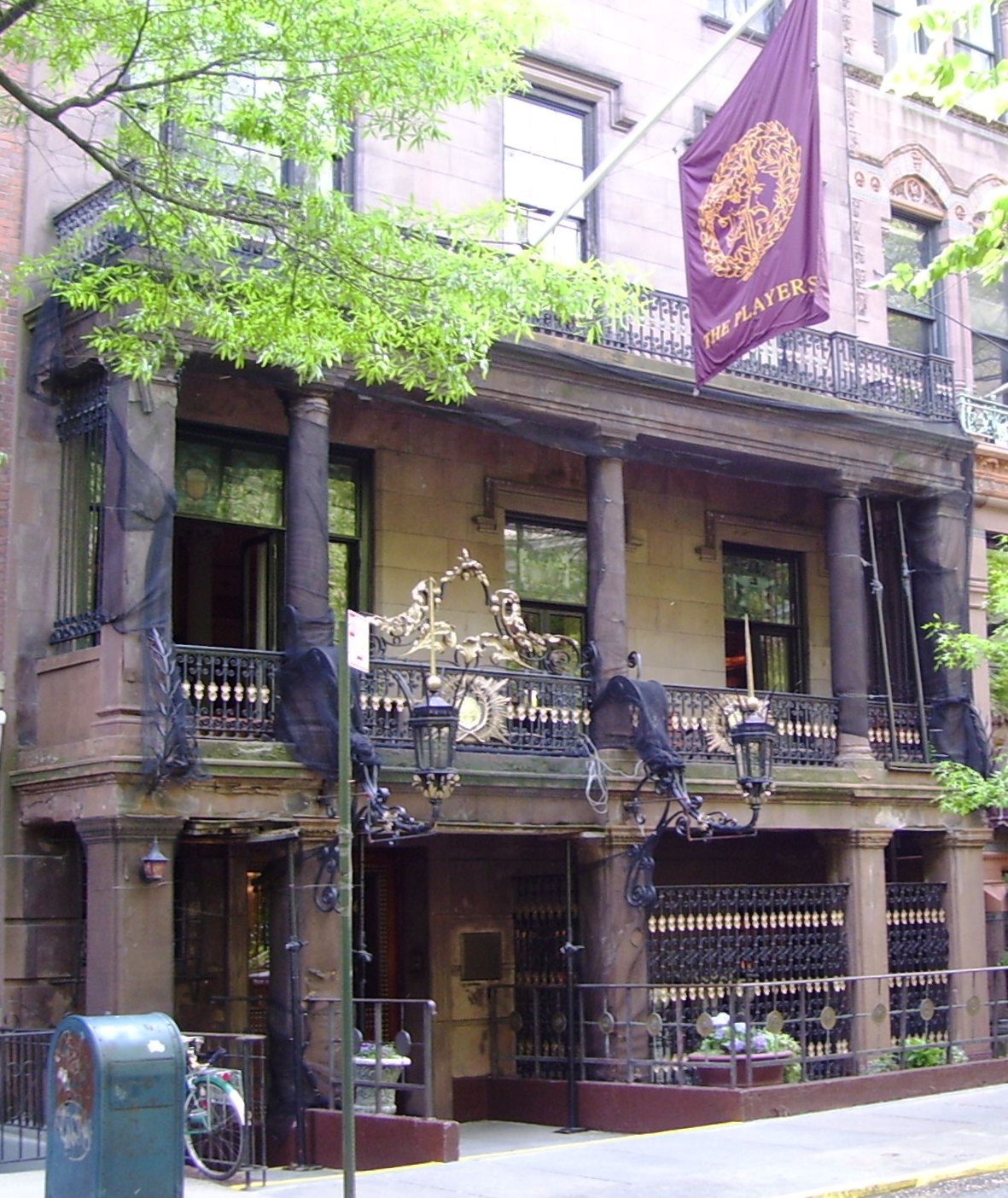
The Players

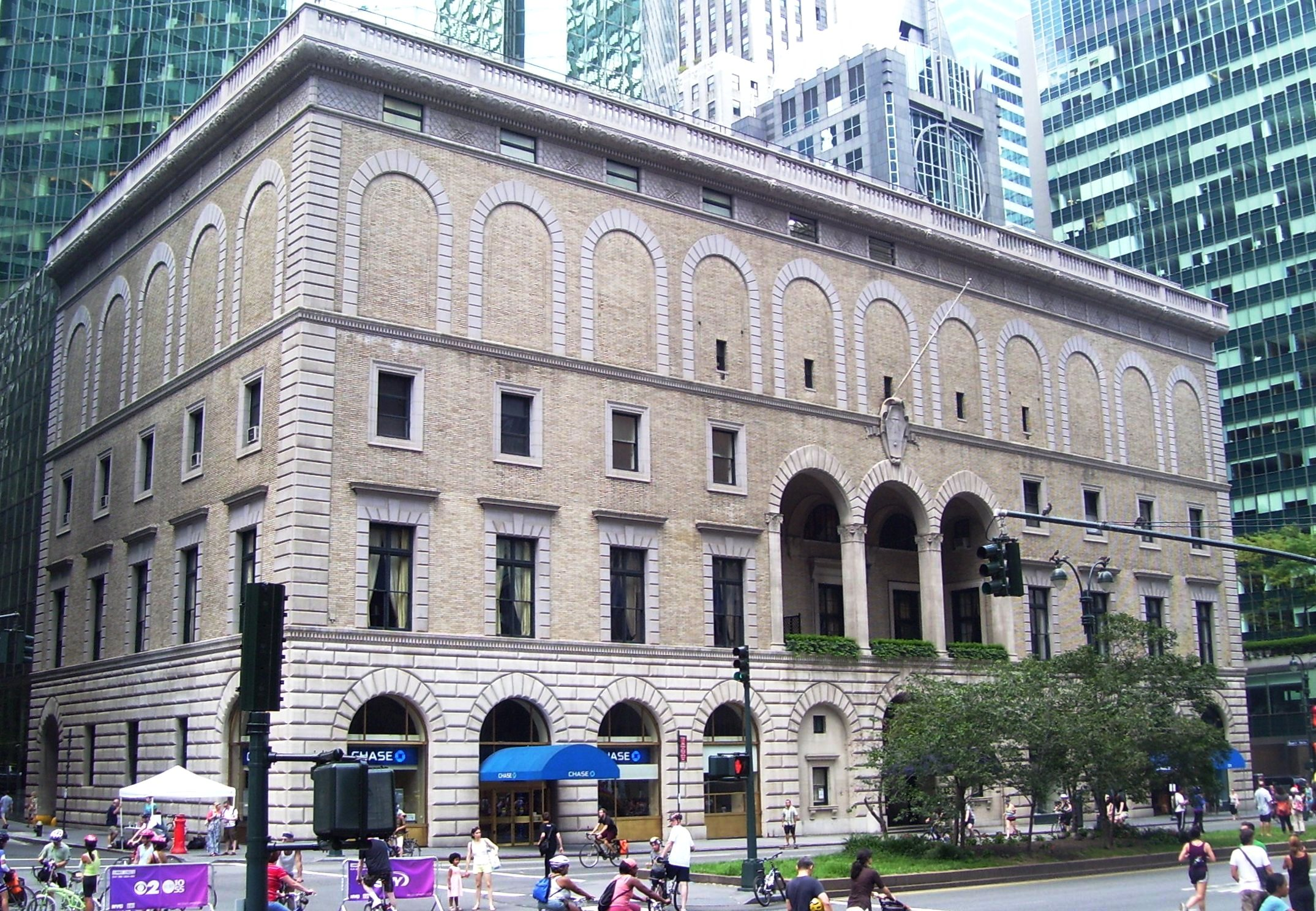
The Racquet and Tennis Club

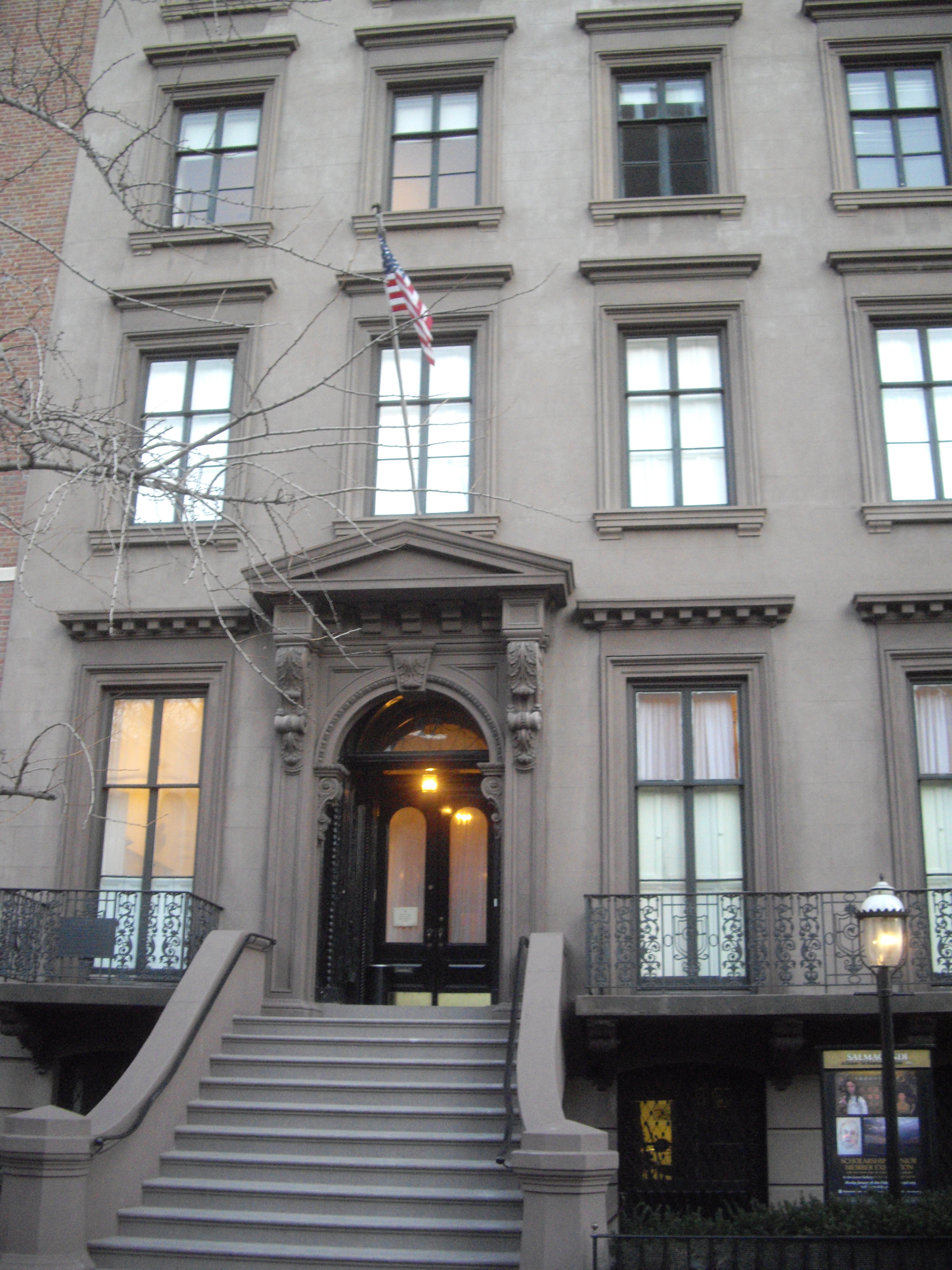
The Salmagundi Club

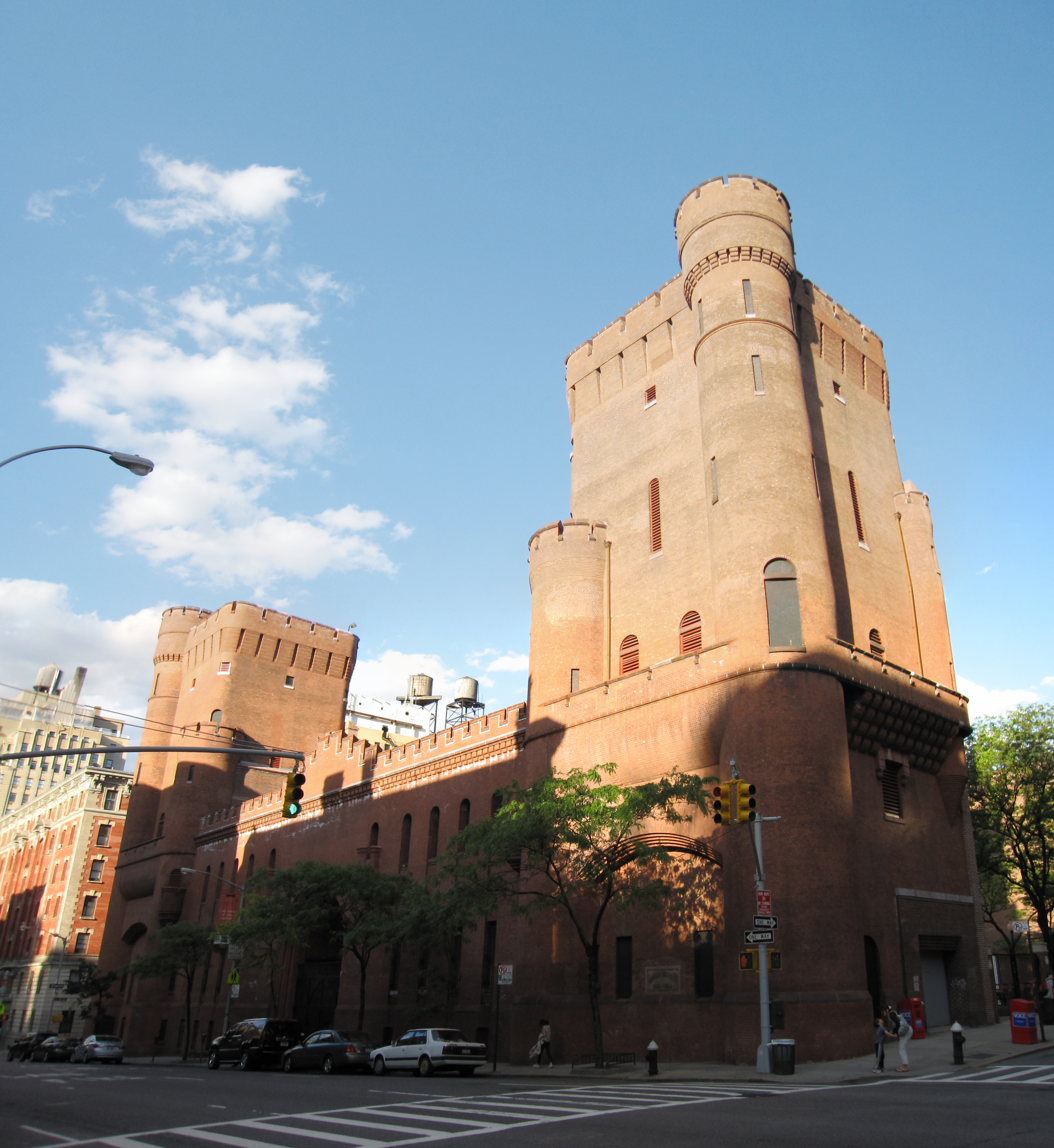
The Squadron A Association (1895–1941)

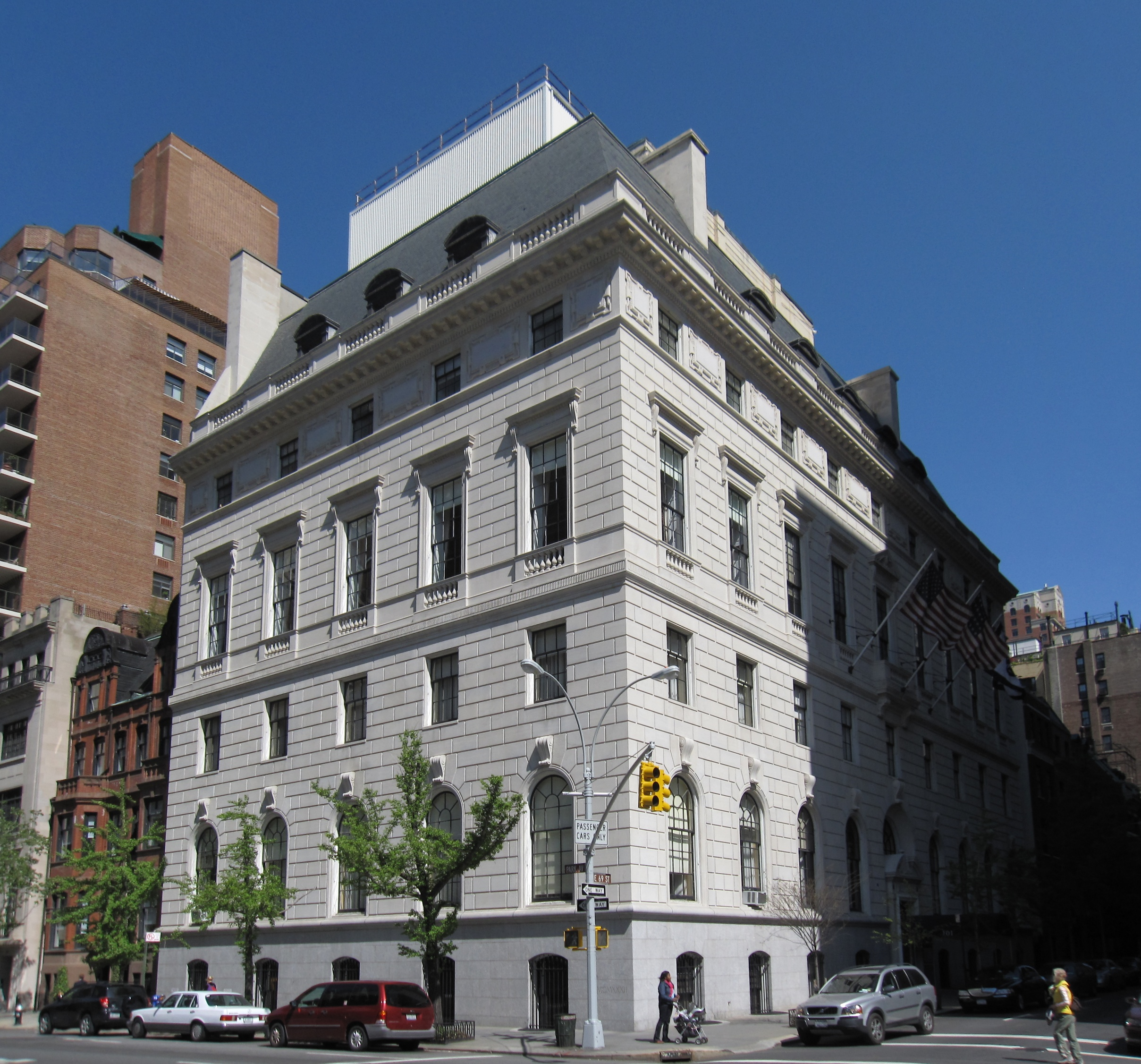
The Union Club of the City of New York

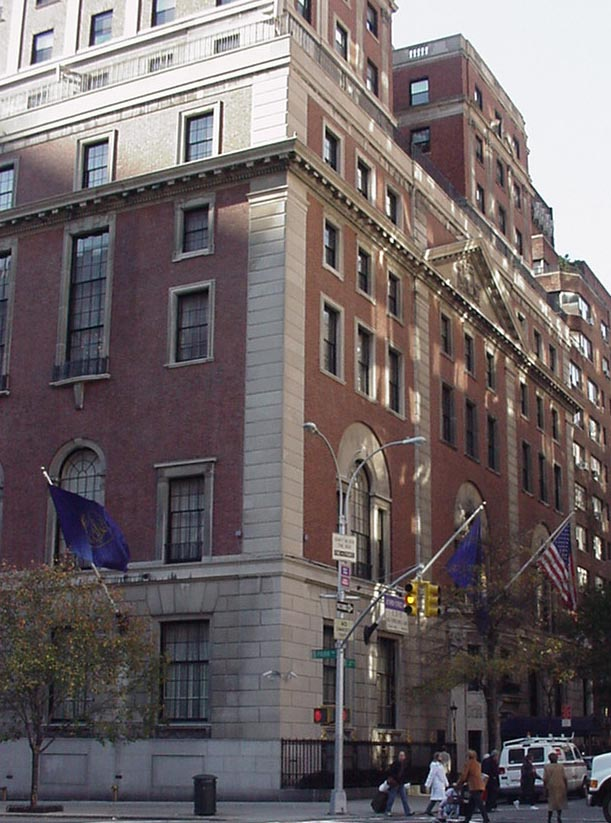
The Union League Club of New York

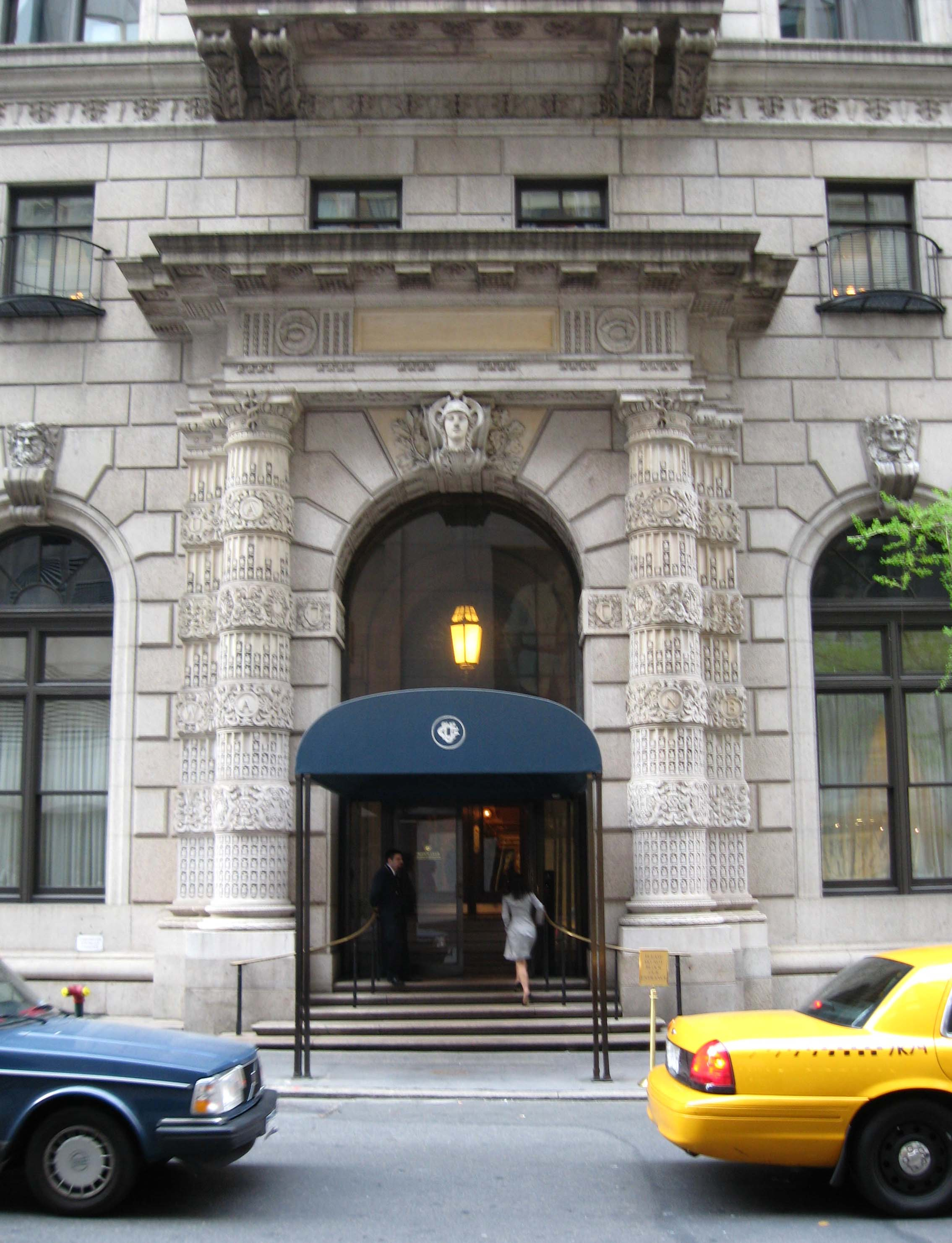
The University Club of New York

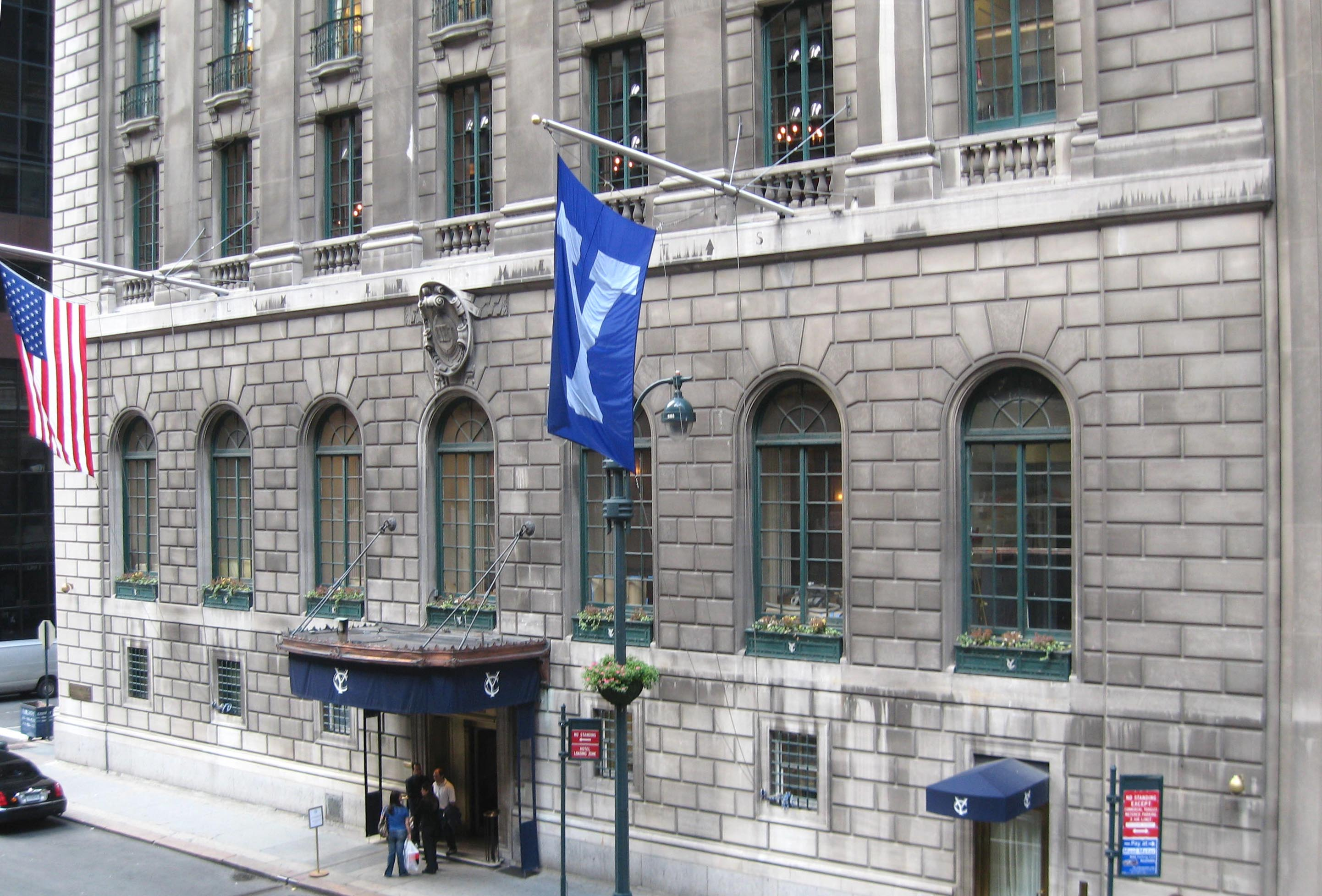
The Yale Club of New York City
- Rochester
  - The Genesee Valley Club (1885)
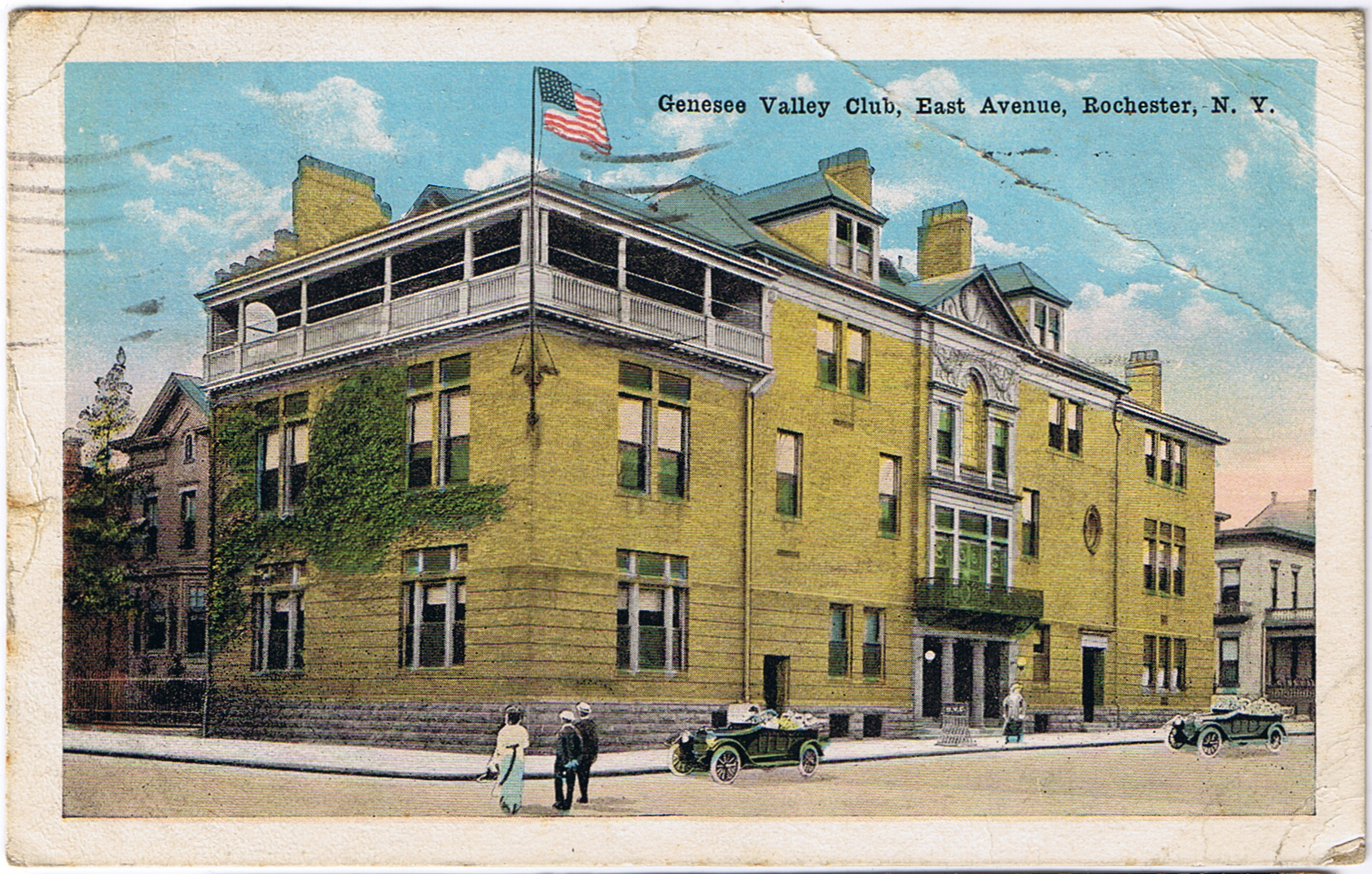
The Genesee Valley Club
- Schenectady
  - The Mohawk Club (1885)
- Syracuse
  - The Century Club of Syracuse (1876)
  - The Pastime Athletic Club (1892)
- Utica
  - The Fort Schuyler Club (1883)
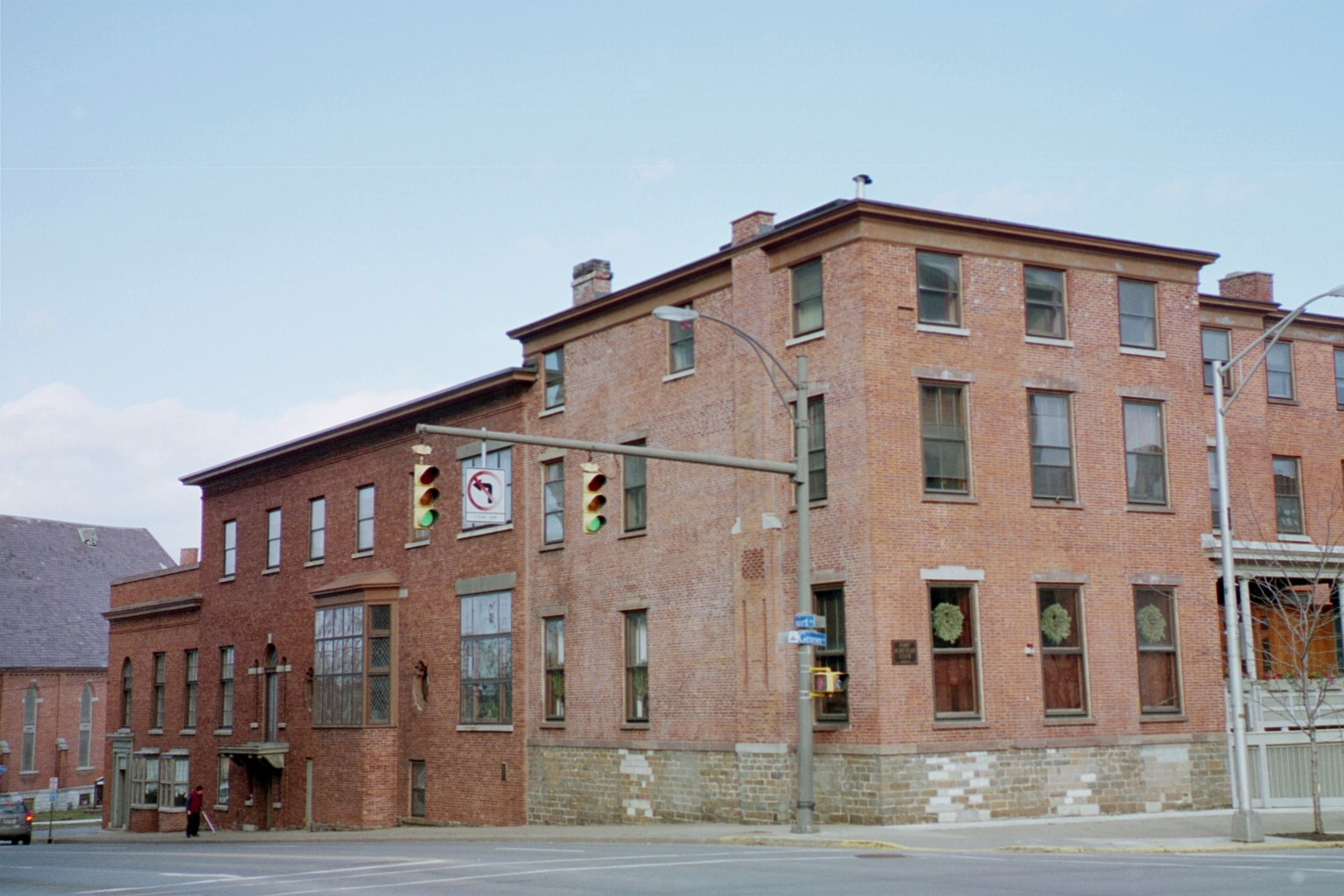
The Fort Schuyler Club

=== North Carolina ===
- Charlotte
  - The Charlotte City Club (1947)
- Durham
  - The University Club of North Carolina (1987)
- High Point
  - The String and Splinter Club (1957)
- Raleigh
  - The Downtown Clubs of Raleigh (1979)
- Wilmington
  - The Cape Fear Club (1866)
  - The City Club at de Rosset (1998)

=== Ohio ===
- Cincinnati
  - The Cincinnati Athletic Club (1853)
  - The Cincinnati Art Club (1890)
  - The Cincinnati Faculty Club (1968)
  - The Cincinnati Women's Club (1894)
  - The Literary Club of Cincinnati (1849)
  - Miami Boat Club (1897)
  - tumps (1900)
  - The Queen City Club (1874)
  - The University Club of Cincinnati (1879)
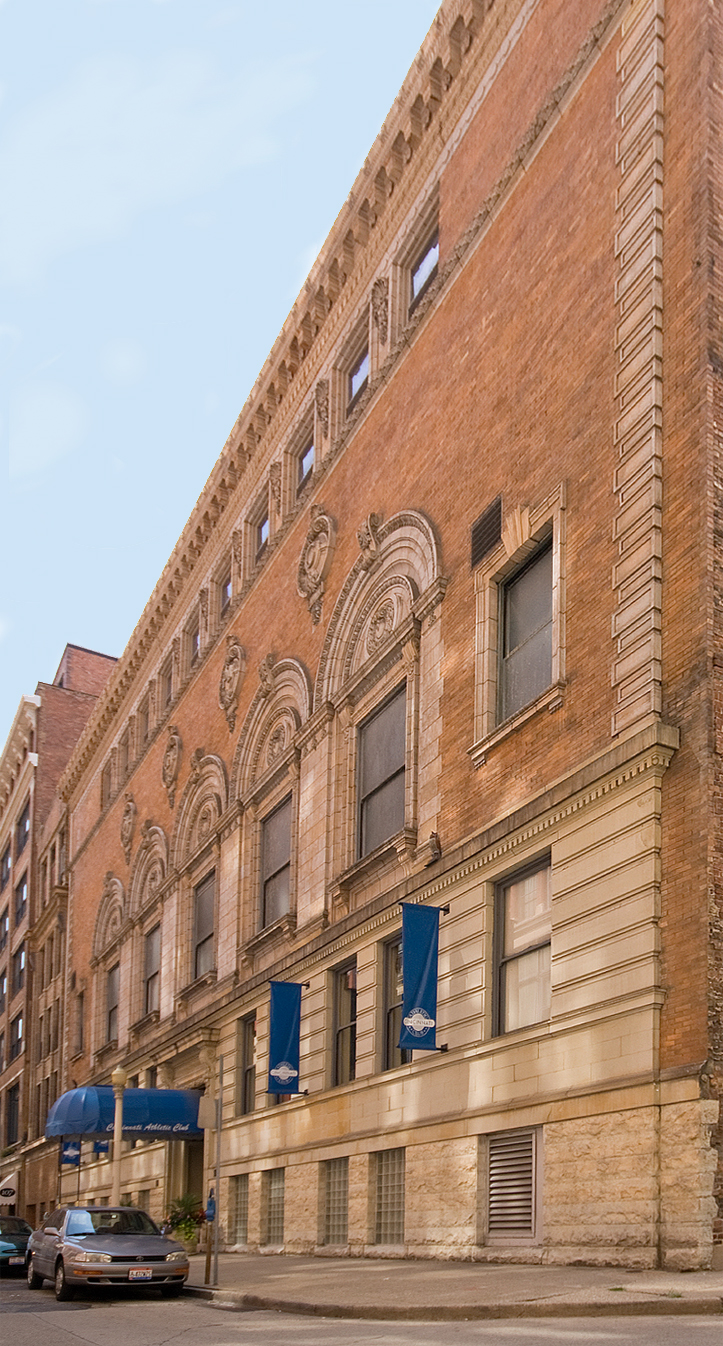
The Cincinnati Athletic Club

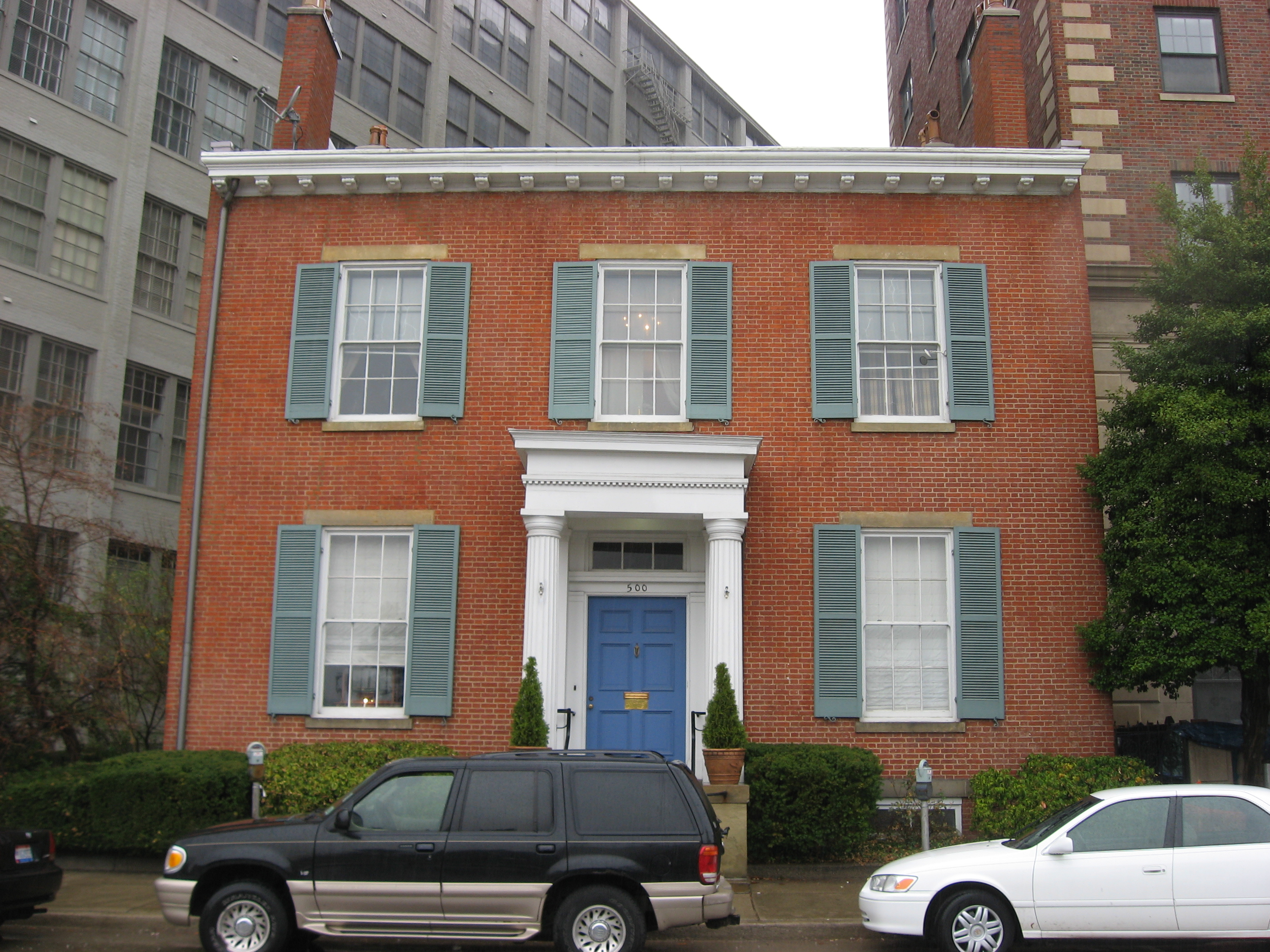
The Literary Club of Cincinnati
- Cleveland
  - The Hermit Club (1904)
  - The Rowfant Club (1892)
  - The Shoreby Club (1993)
  - The Tavern Club (1892)
  - The Union Club (1872)
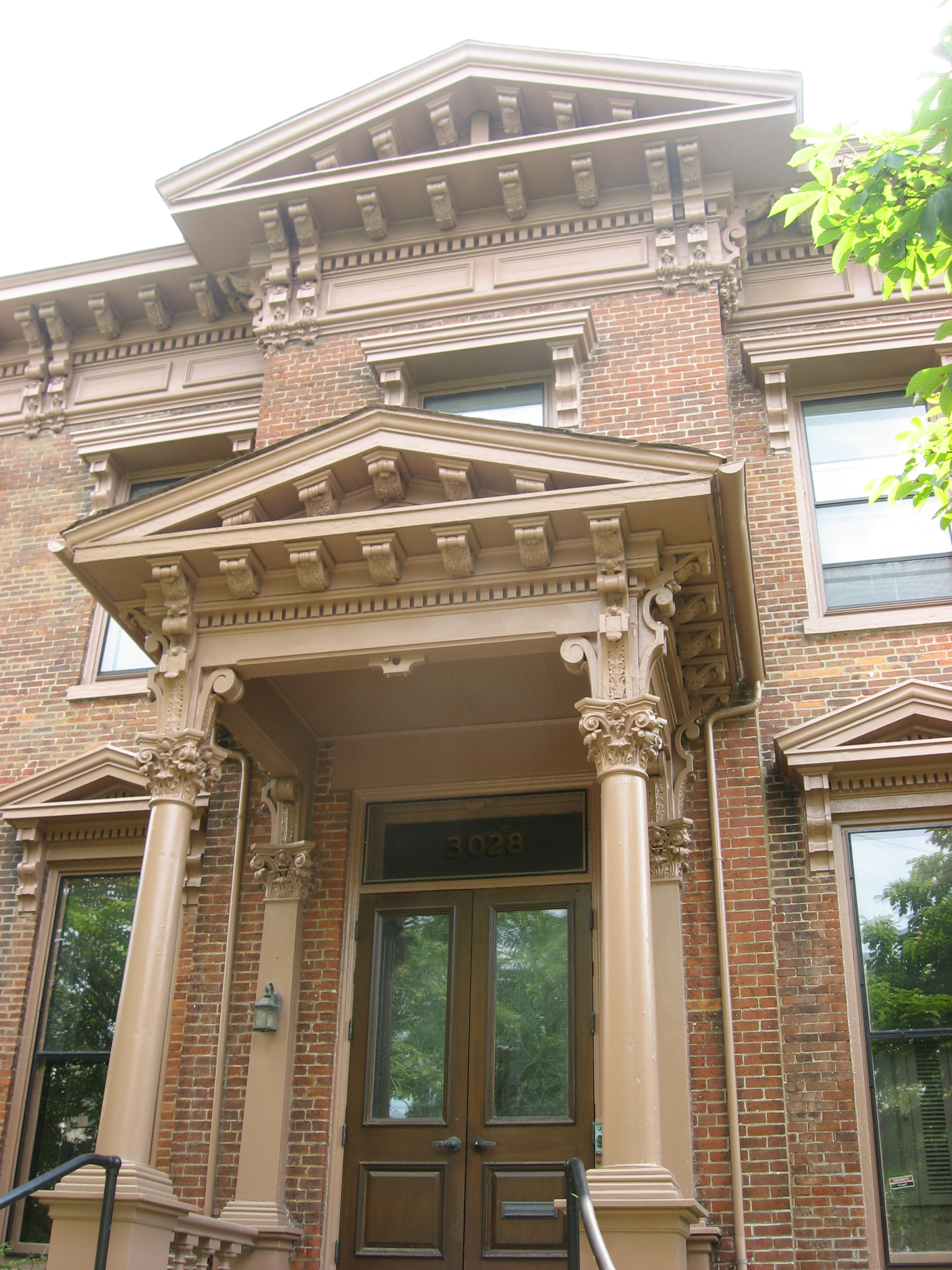
The Rowfant Club

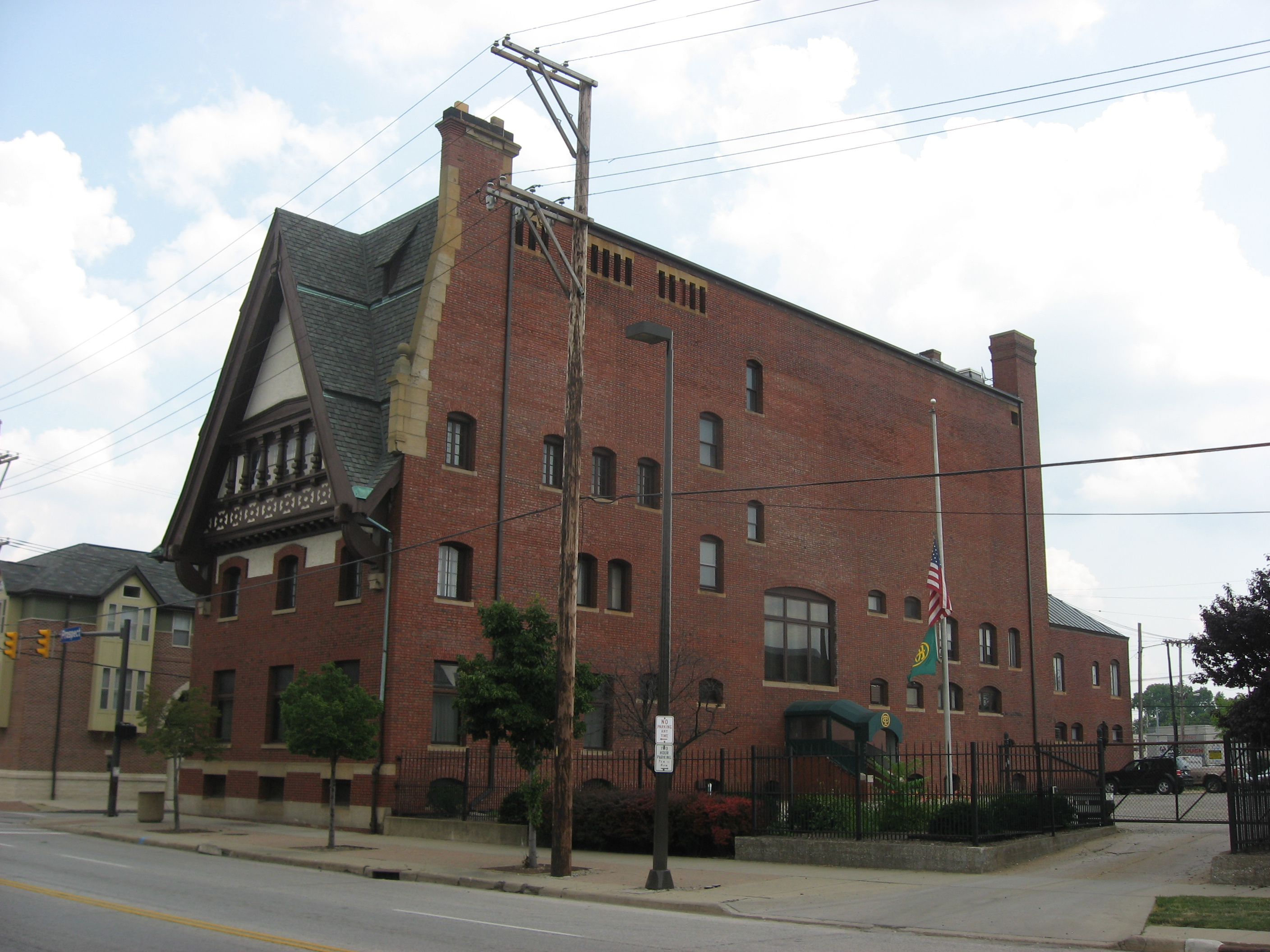
The Tavern Club

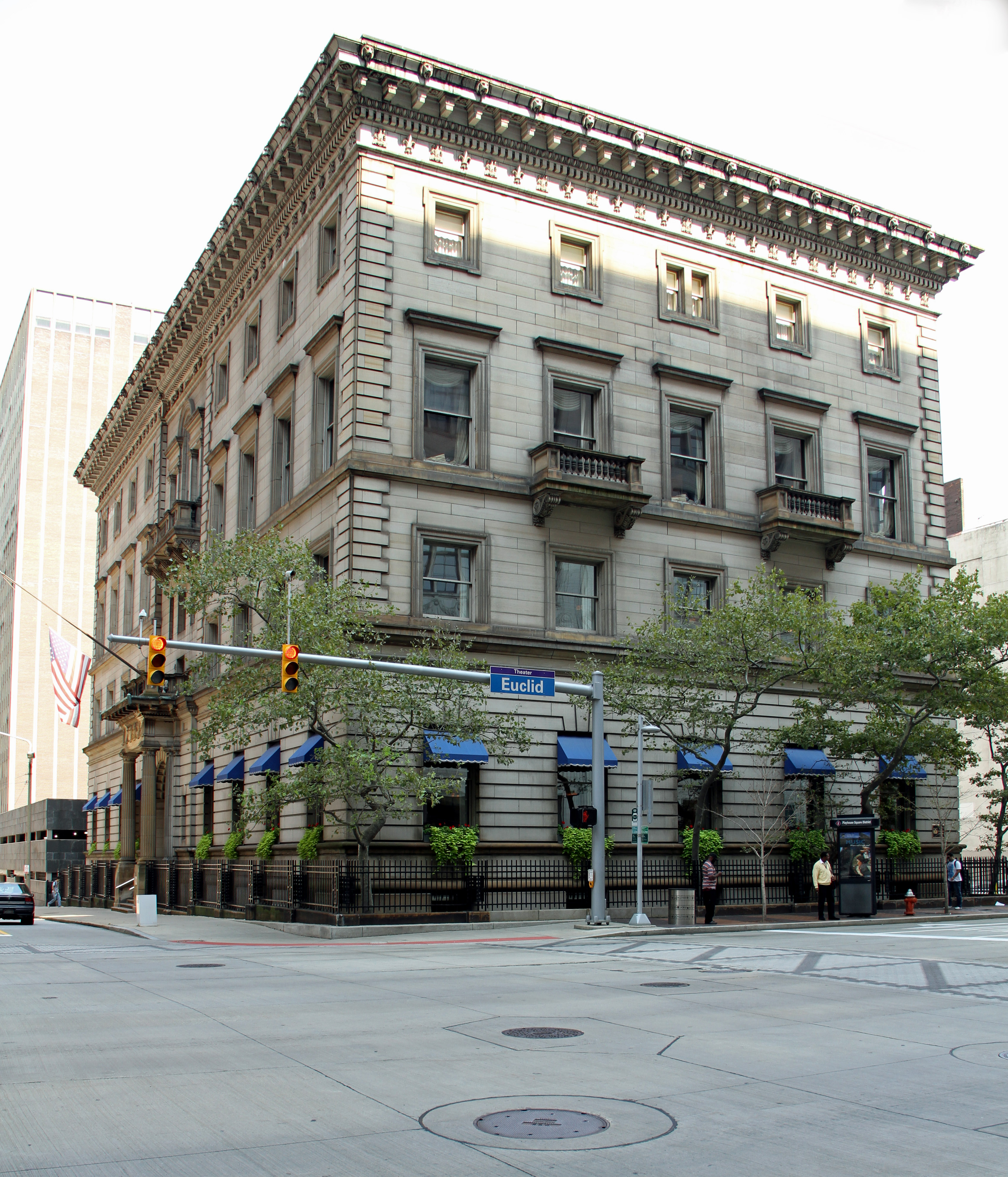
The Union Club
- Columbus
  - The Athletic Club of Columbus (1916)
  - Aubergine Private Dining Club (1990)
  - Columbus Club (1886)
  - The Ohio State University Faculty Club (1939)
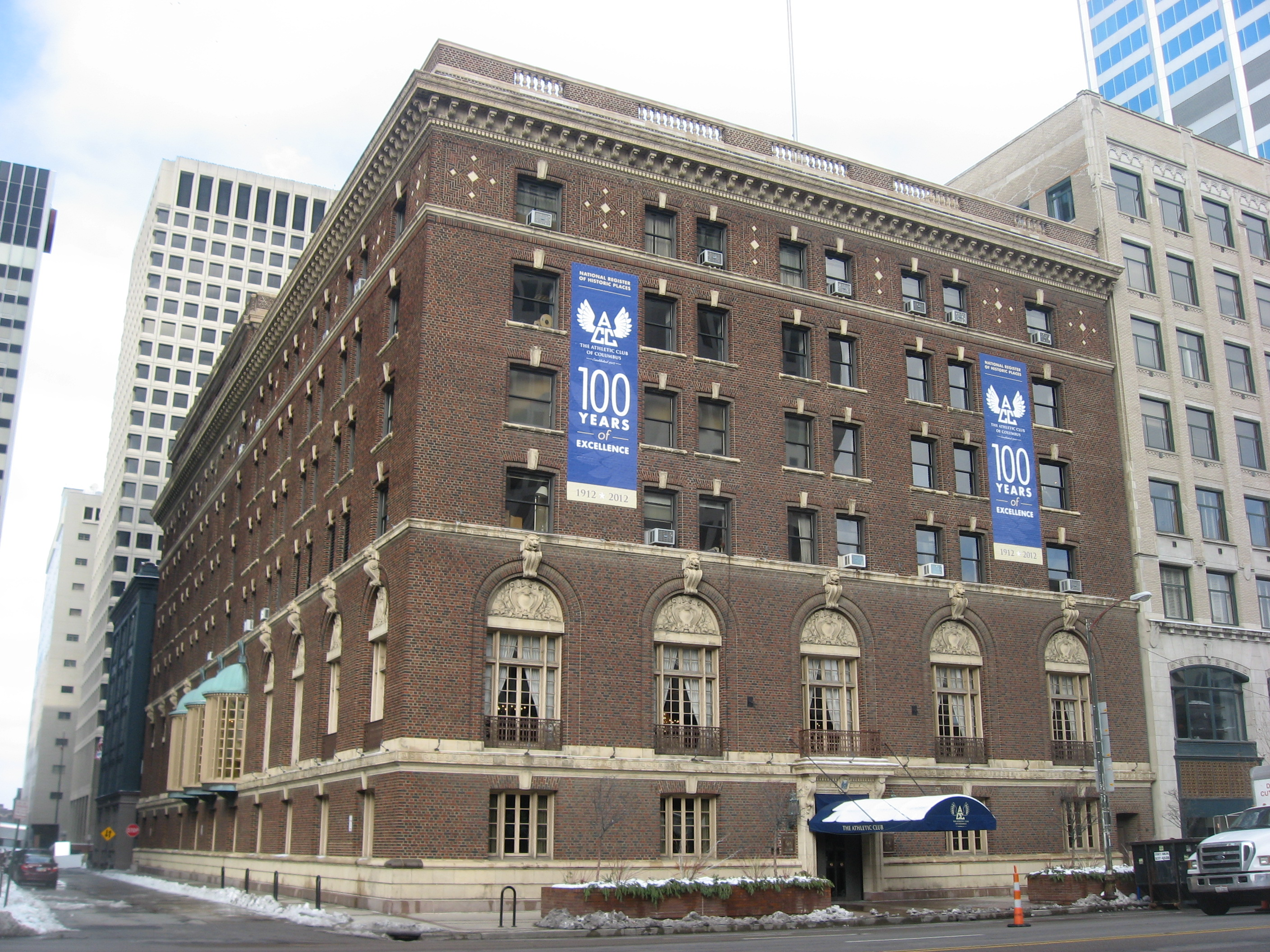
The Athletic Club of Columbus

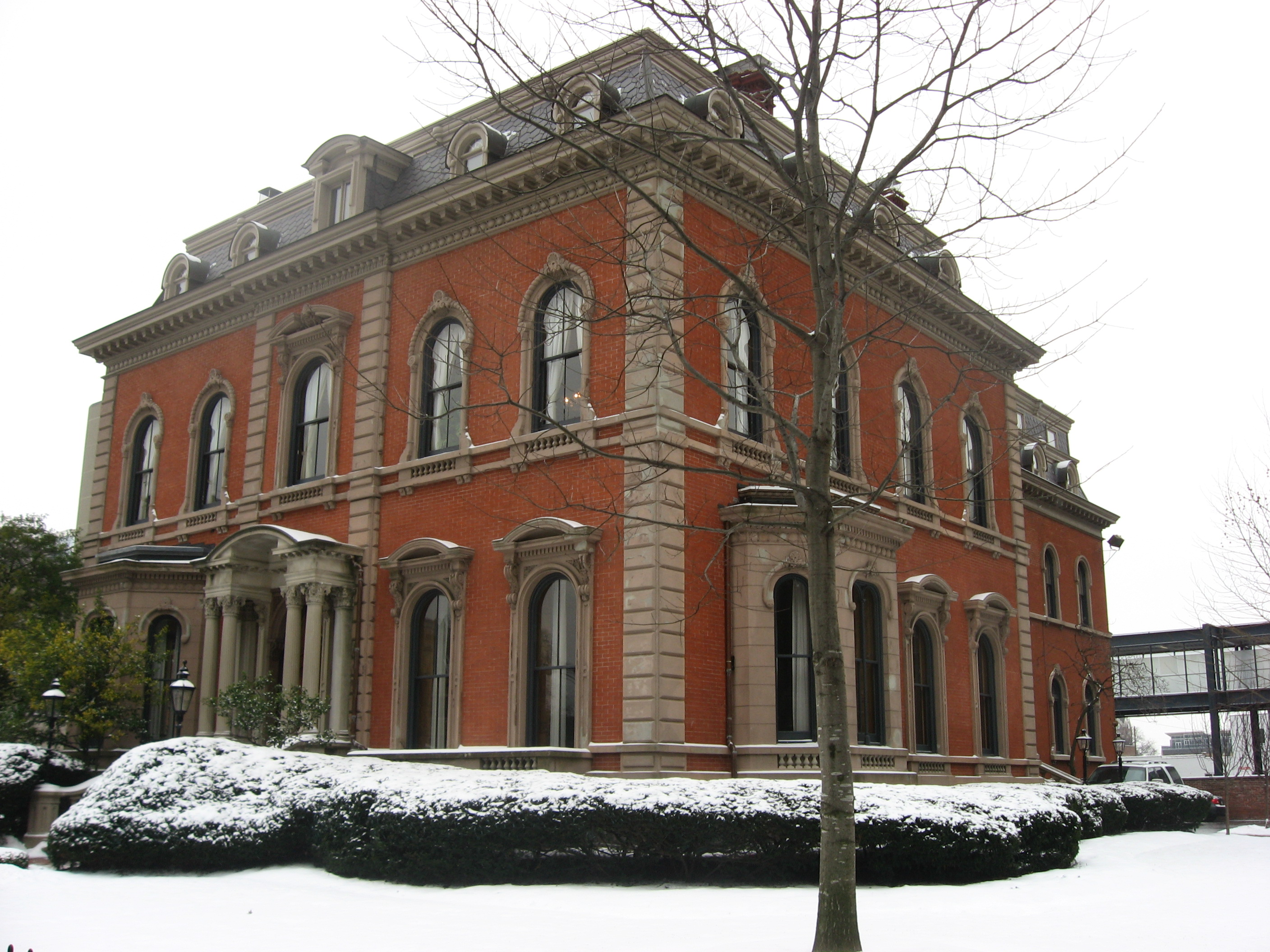
The Columbus Club
- Dayton
  - The Engineers Club of Dayton (1914)
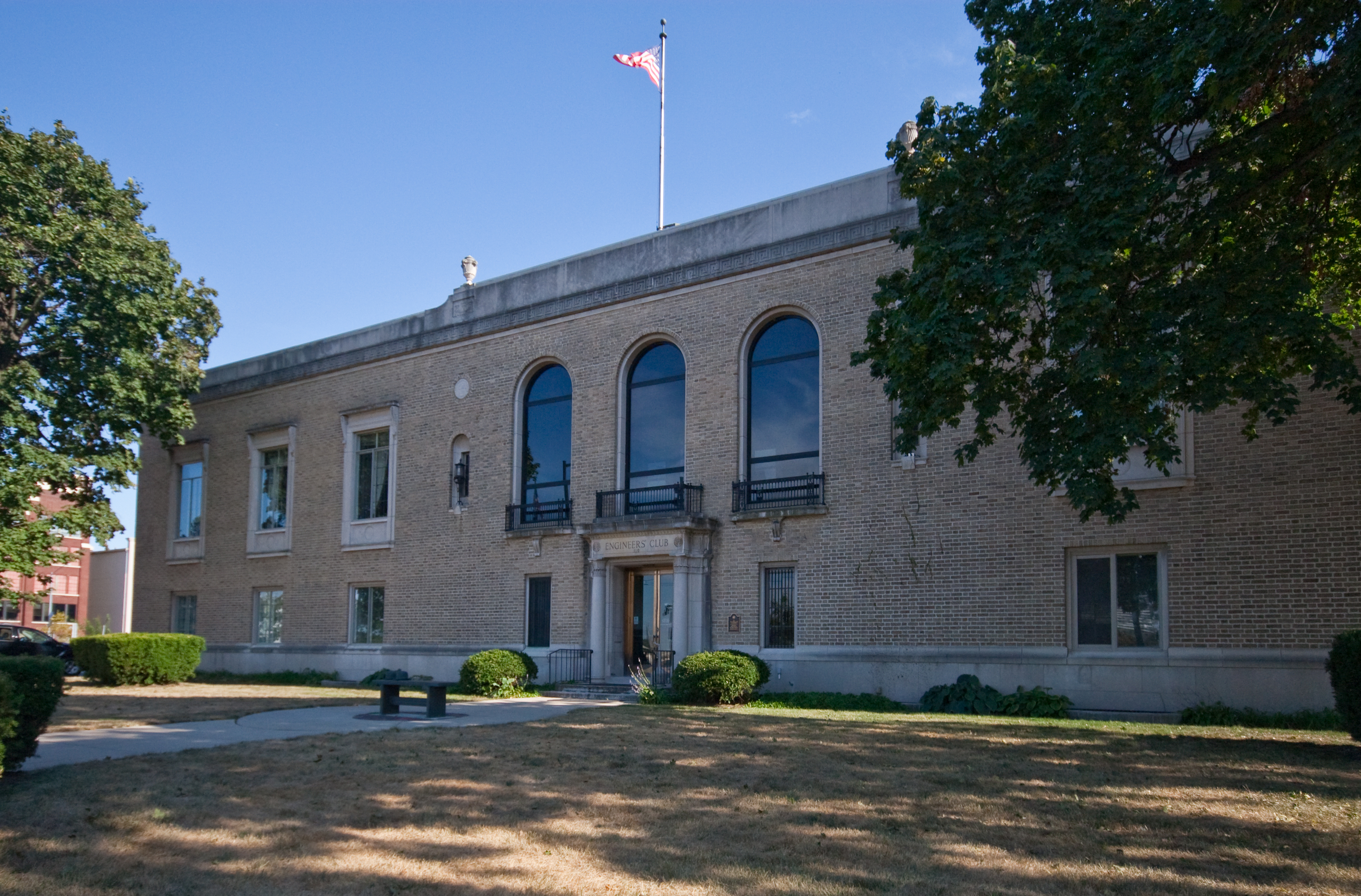
The Engineers Club of Dayton
- Toledo
  - The Toledo Club (1889)
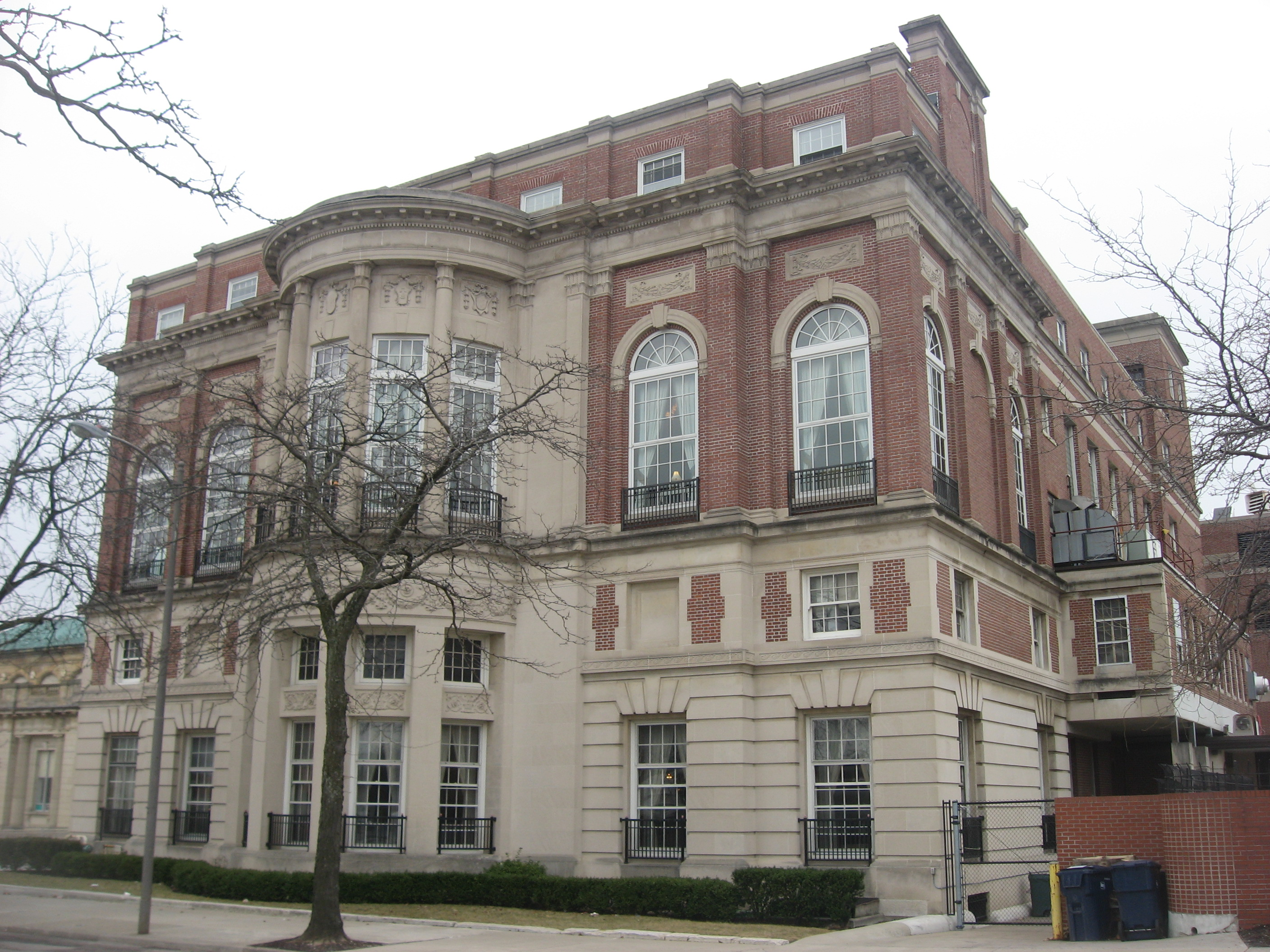
The Toledo Club

=== Oklahoma ===
- Edmond
  - The Petroleum Club of Oklahoma City (1956)
- Norman
  - The University Club of the University of Oklahoma (1925)
- Oklahoma City
  - The Petroleum Club of Oklahoma City (1956)
- Tulsa
  - The Summit (1967)
  - The Tulsa Press Club (1906)
  - Tulsa Club Hotel (1927), originally the Tulsa Club

=== Oregon ===
- Portland
  - The Arlington Club (1867)
  - The Founders Club (1984)
  - The Multnomah Athletic Club (1891)
  - The University Club of Portland (1898)
  - The St Johns Bachelor Club (1909)
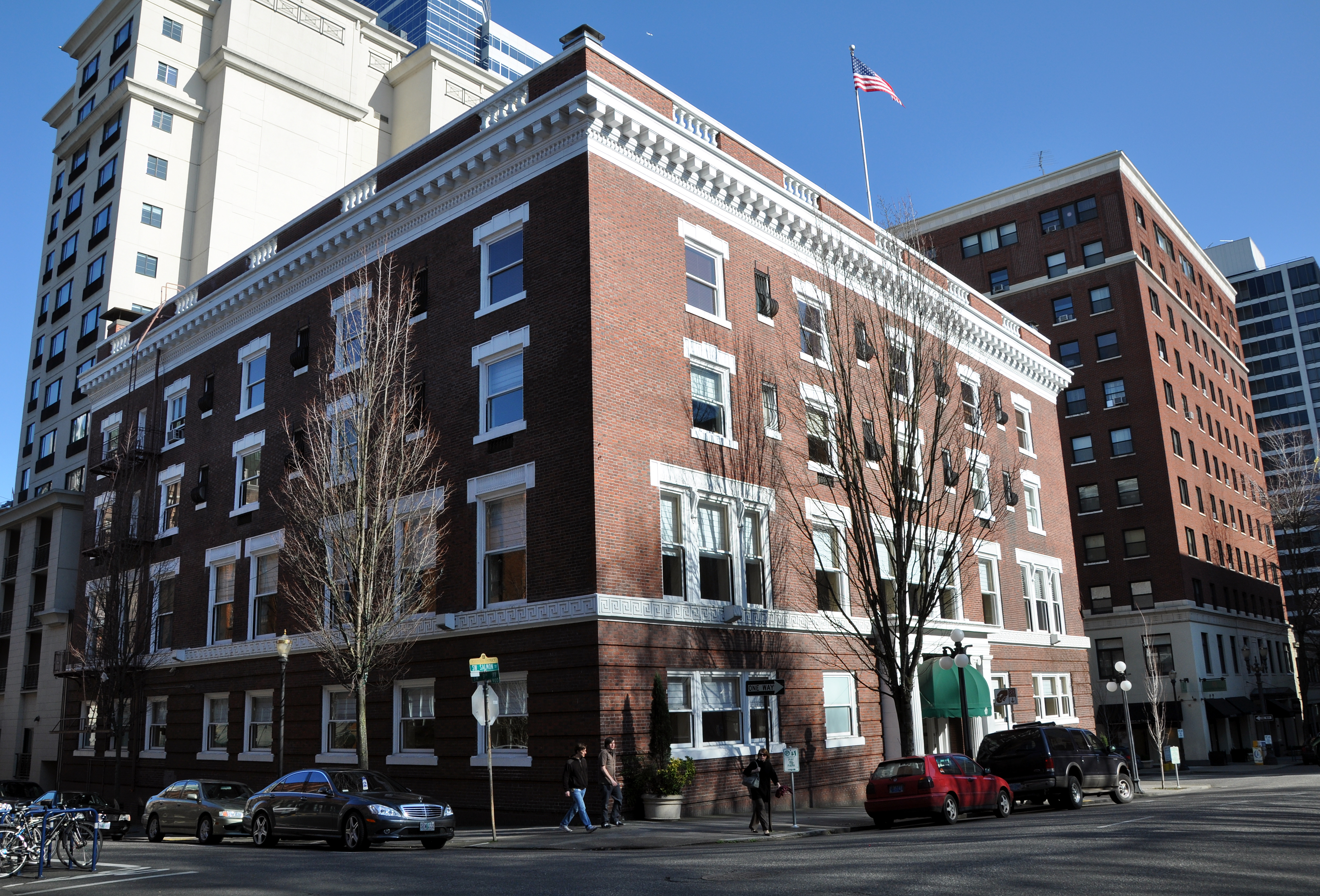
The Arlington Club

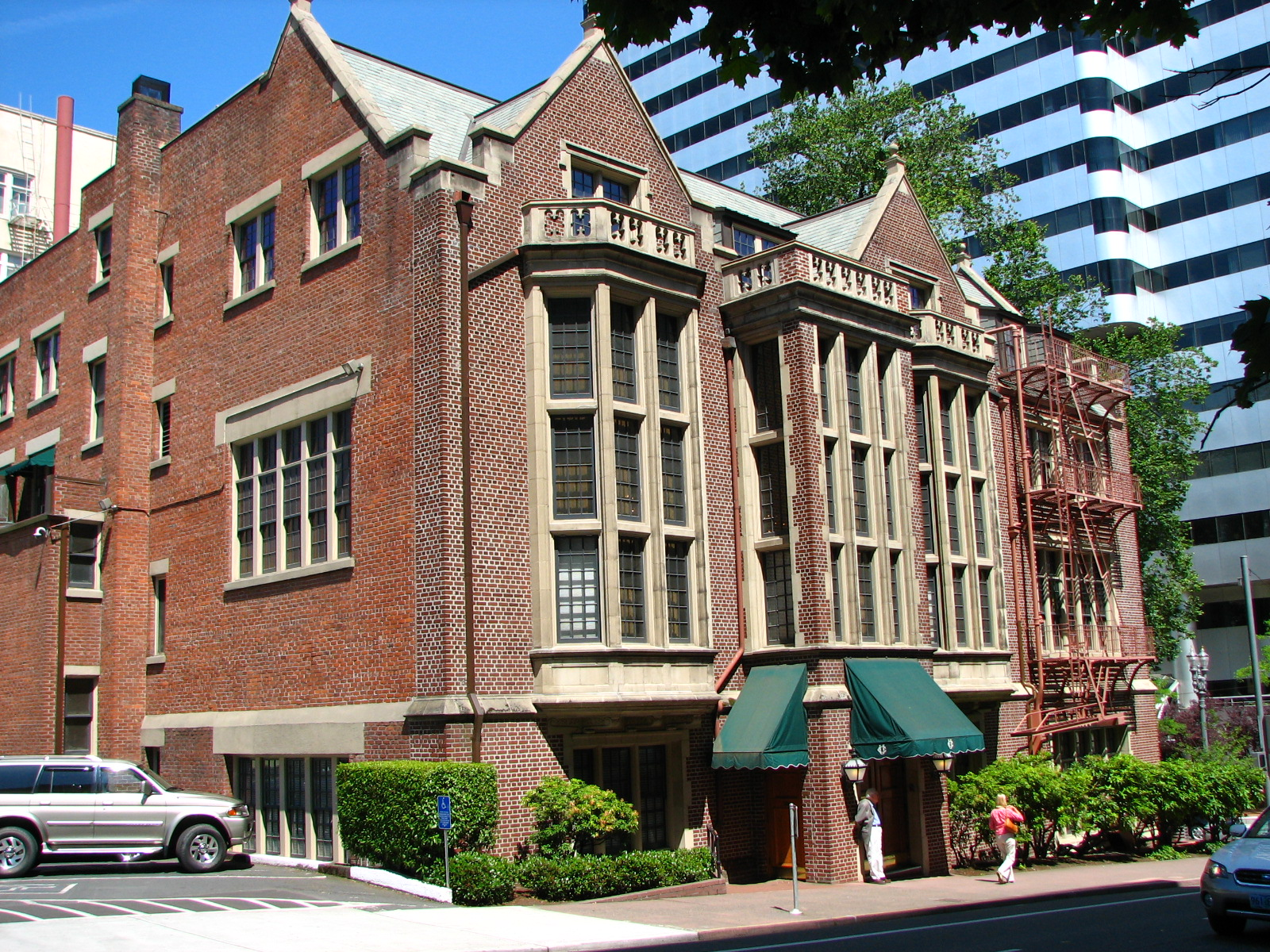
The University Club of Portland

=== Pennsylvania ===
- Andalusia
  - The Schuylkill Fishing Company (1732), second-oldest existing gentlemen's club in North America (behind the South River Club)
- Bethlehem
  - The University Club of Bethlehem (1911)
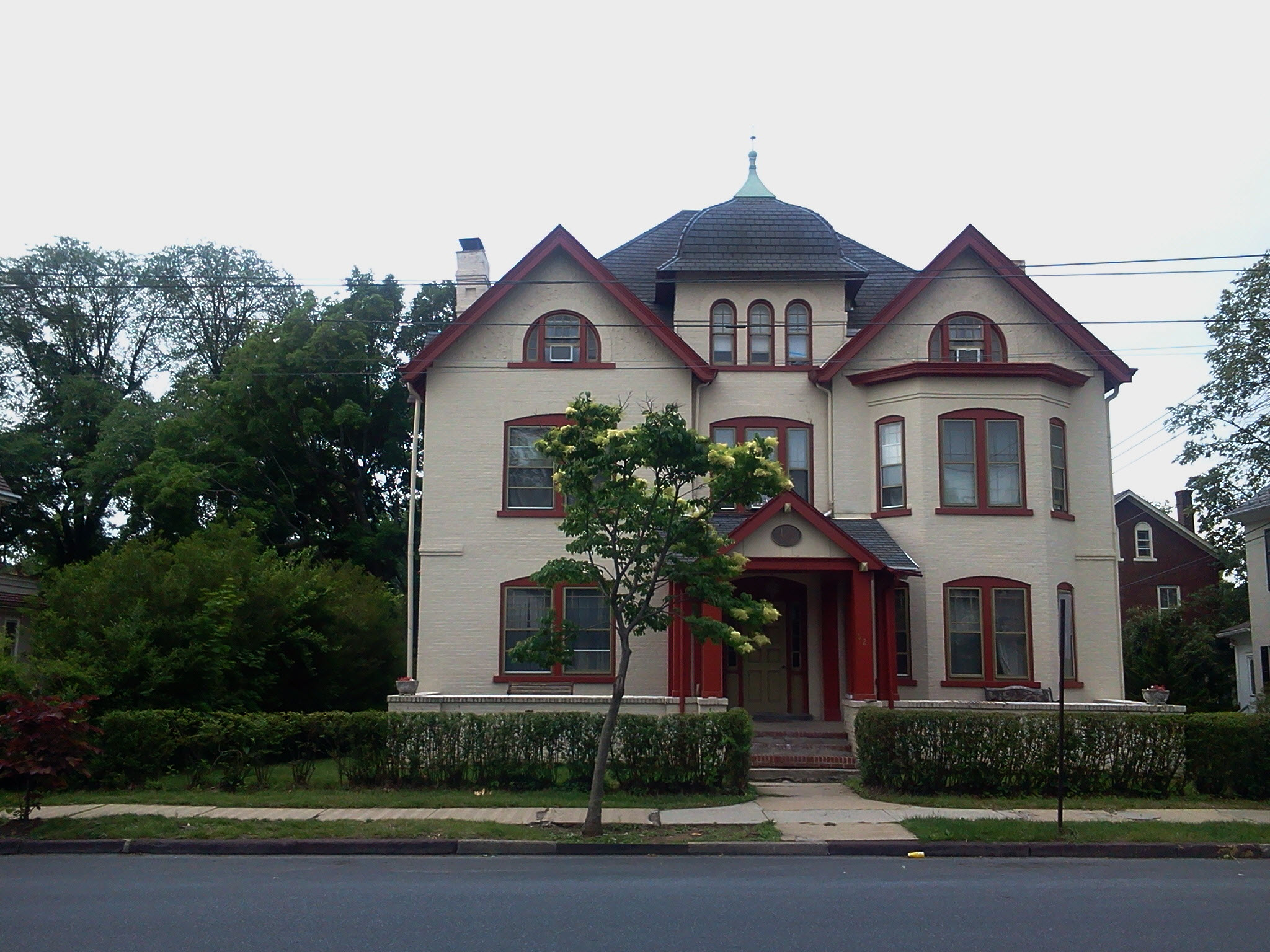
The University Club of Bethlehem
- Catasauqua
  - The Catasauqua Club (1897)
- Easton
  - The Pomfret Club (1882)
- Erie
  - The Erie Club (1882)
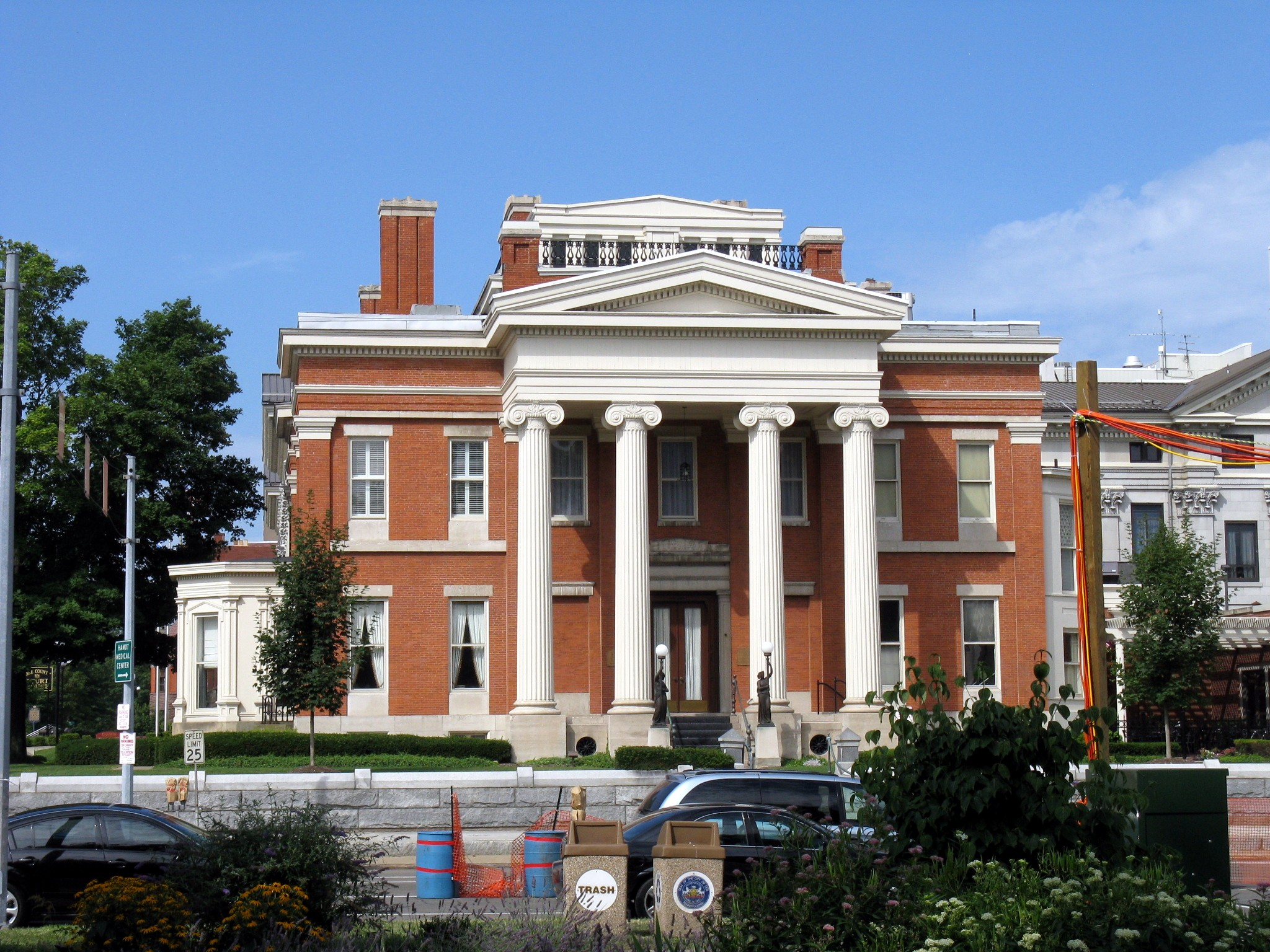
The Erie Club
- Harrisburg
  - The Tuesday Club (1962–2002), insolvent Replaced by the Hill Society.
- Lancaster
  - The Hamilton Club (1889)
- Philadelphia
  - The Engineers Club of Philadelphia (1877–1990), lost clubhouse, continues to exist as an "inner club" of the Racquet Club of Philadelphia
  - The Franklin Inn Club (1902)
  - The Mask and Wig Club (1889)
  - The Pen & Pencil Club (1892)
  - The Penn Club of Philadelphia (1875)
  - The Philadelphia Club (1834), fourth oldest existing gentlemen's club in the United States (behind the South River Club, the Schuylkill Fishing Company, and the Old Colony Club)
  - The Racquet Club of Philadelphia (1889)
  - The Union League of Philadelphia (1862)
  - The University Club at Penn (1898), previously called the Lenape Club
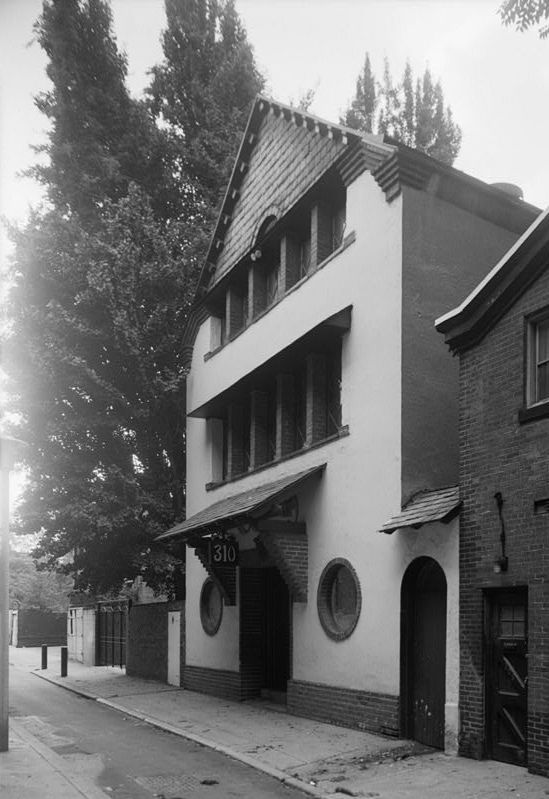
The Mask and Wig Club

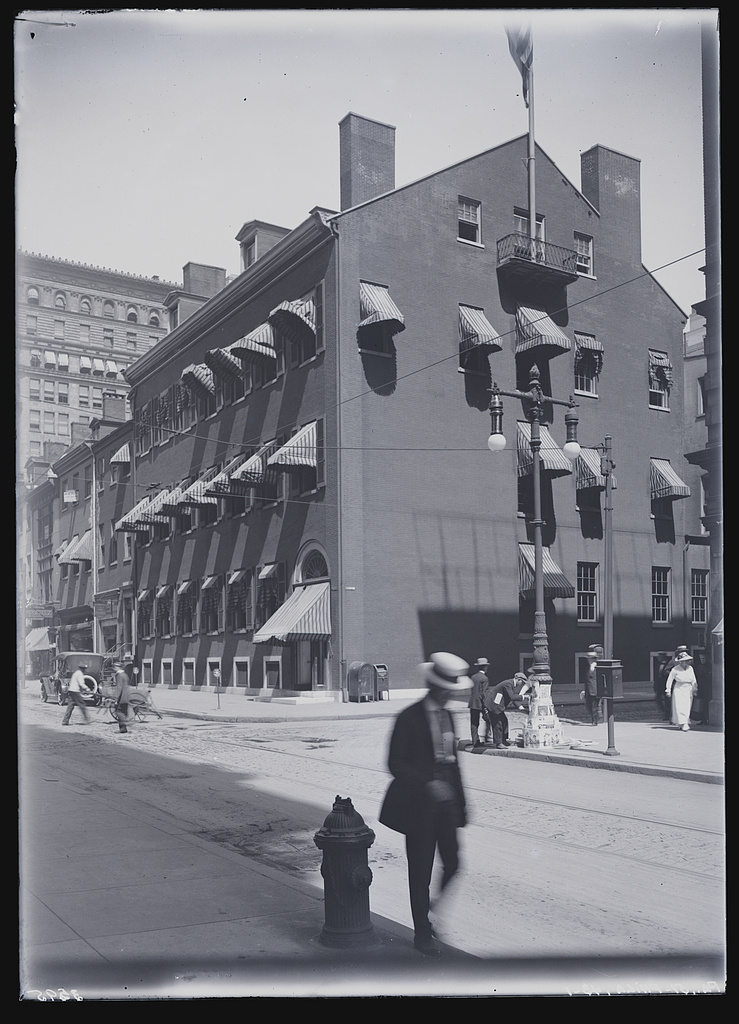
The Philadelphia Club

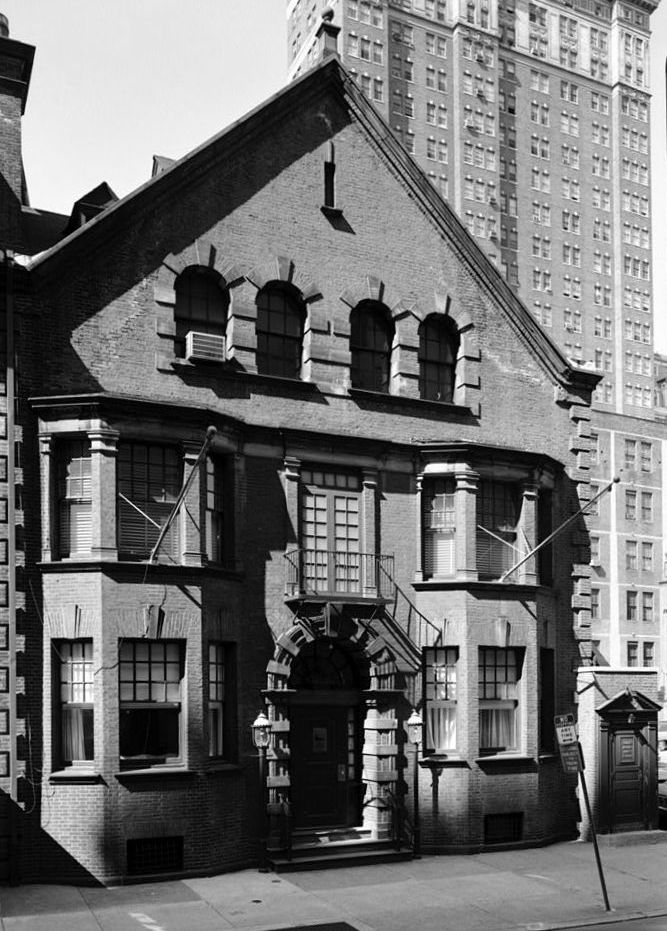
The Poor Richard Club (1925–1979)

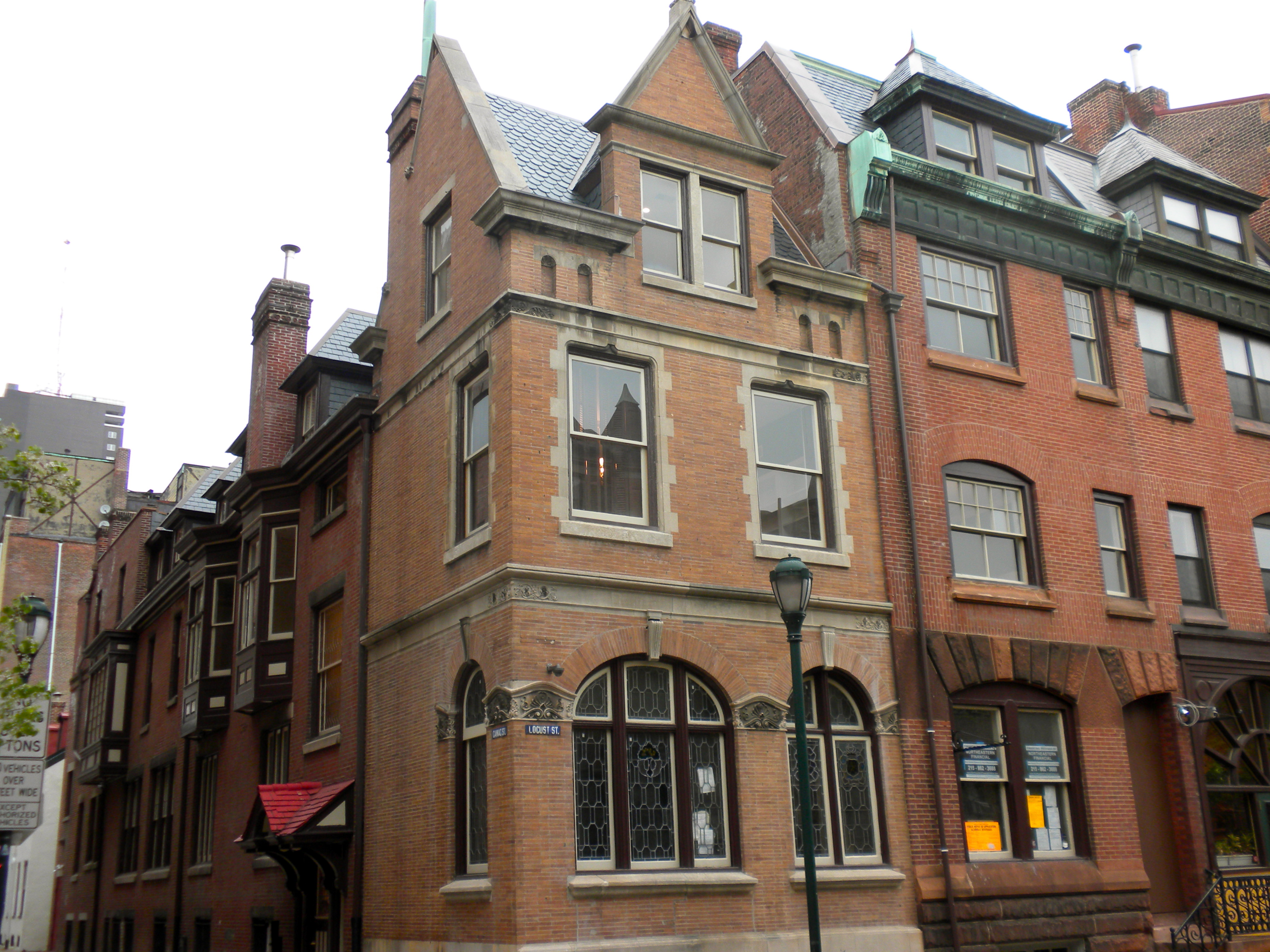
The Princeton Club (1910–1975)

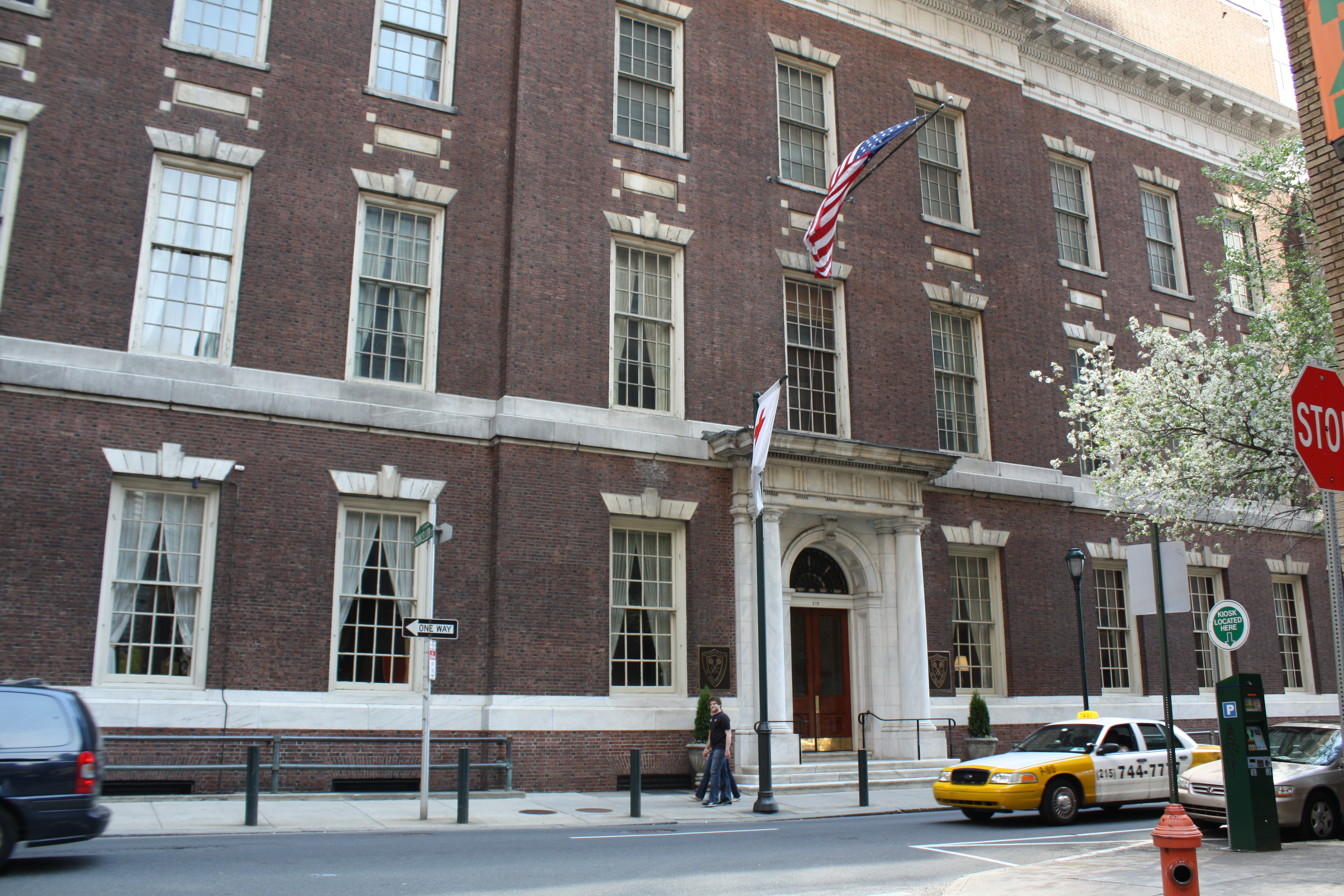
The Racquet Club of Philadelphia

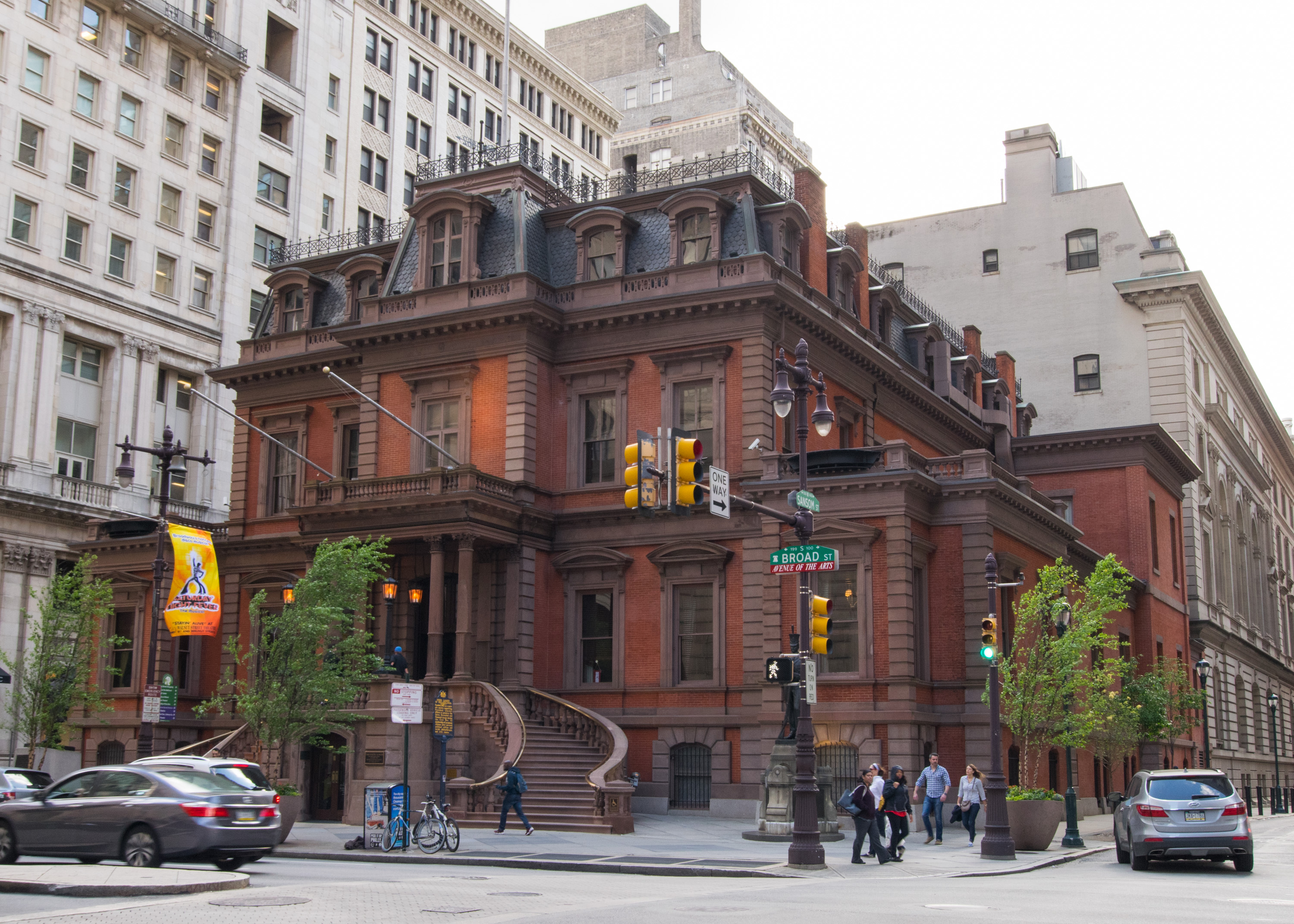
The Union League of Philadelphia
- Pittsburgh
  - The Allegheny Harvard-Yale-Princeton Club (1930)
  - The Duquesne Club (1873)
  - The Pittsburgh Athletic Association (1908)
  - The Union Club of Pittsburgh (1903)
  - The University Club of Pittsburgh (1923)
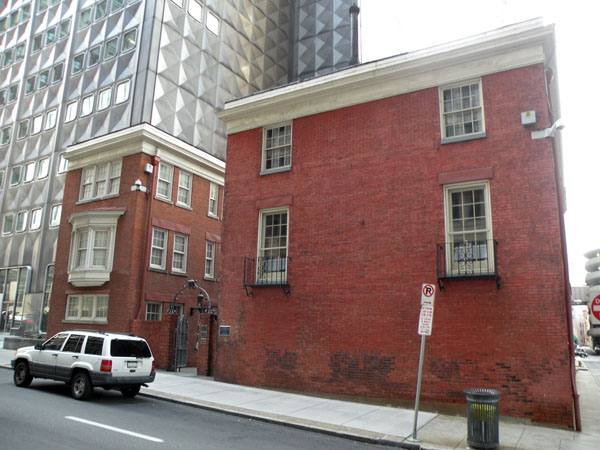
The Allegheny HYP Club

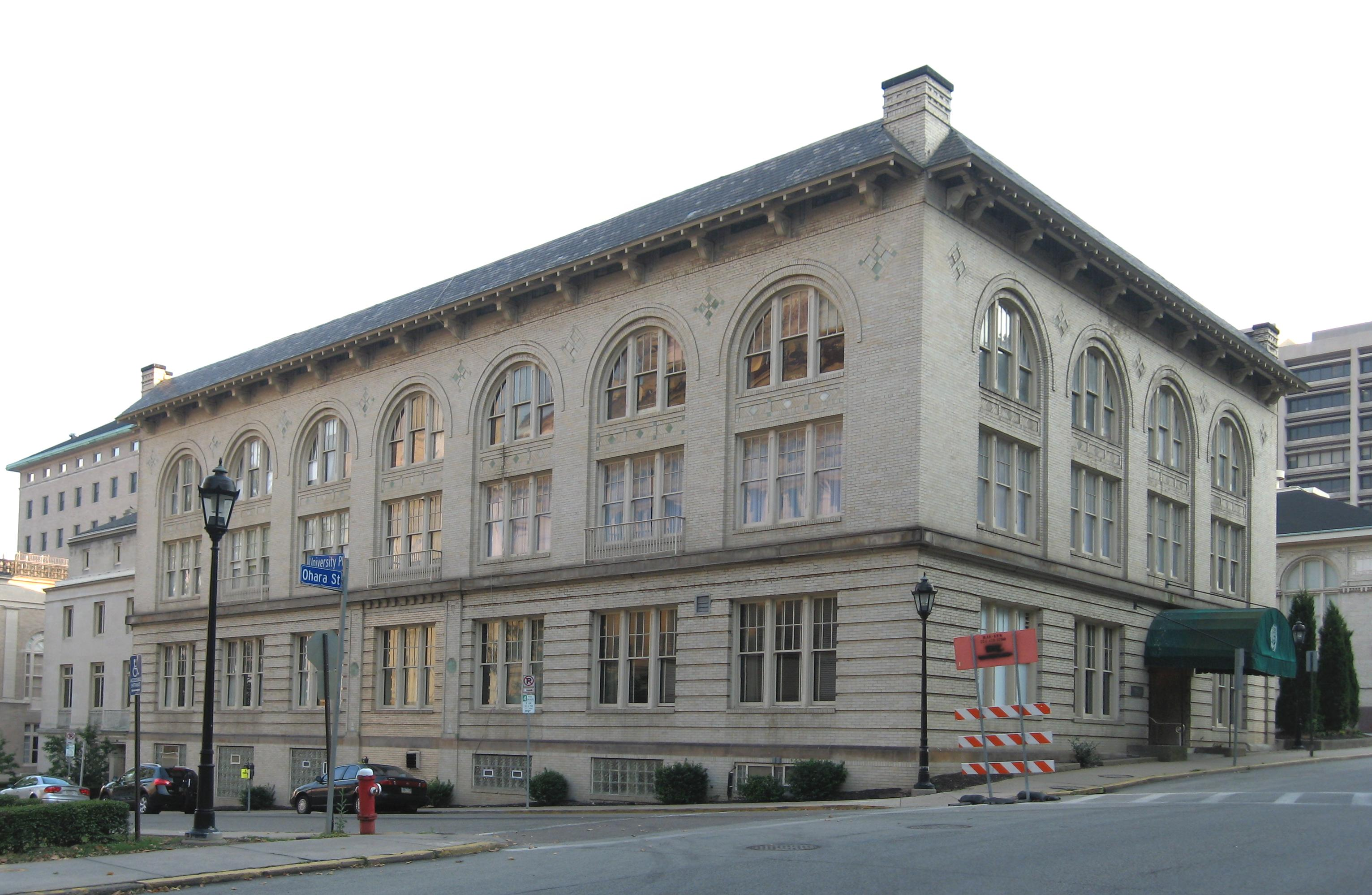
The Concordia Club (1913–2009)

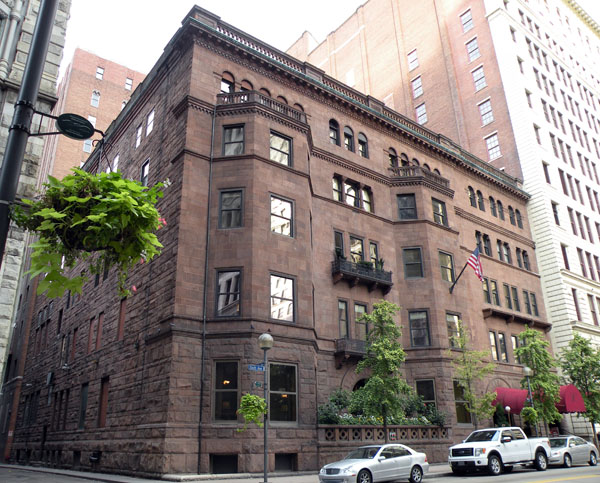
The Duquesne Club

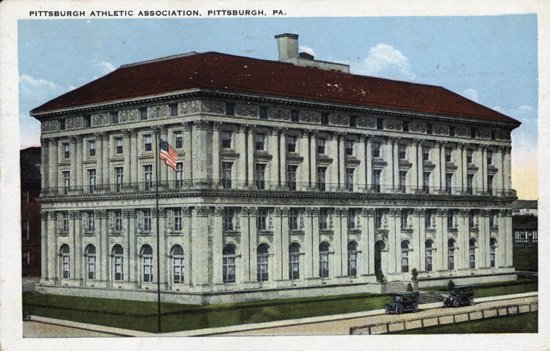
The Pittsburgh Athletic Association

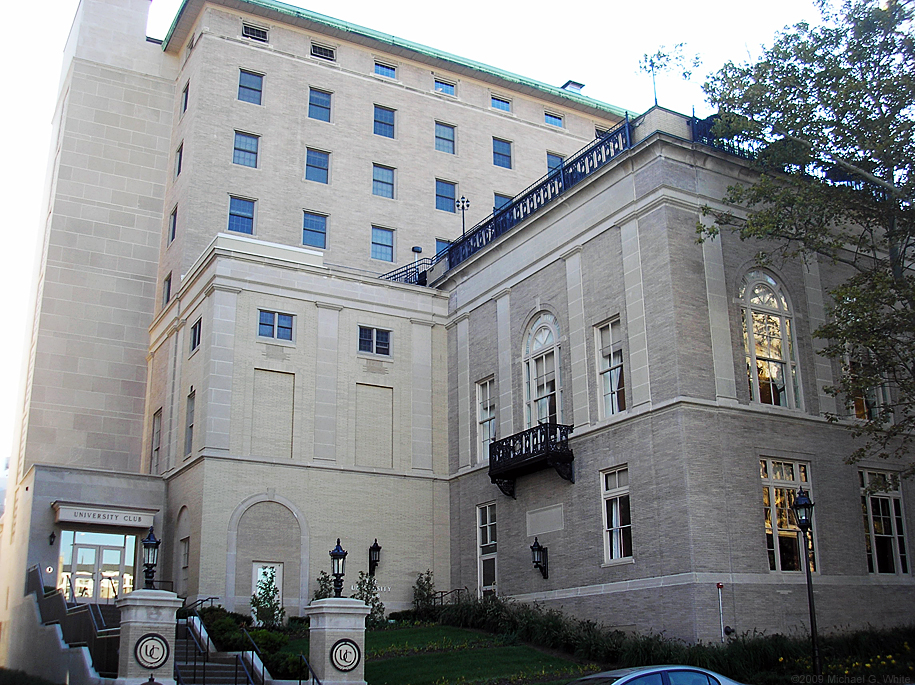
The University Club of Pittsburgh
- State College
  - The University Club of State College (1908)
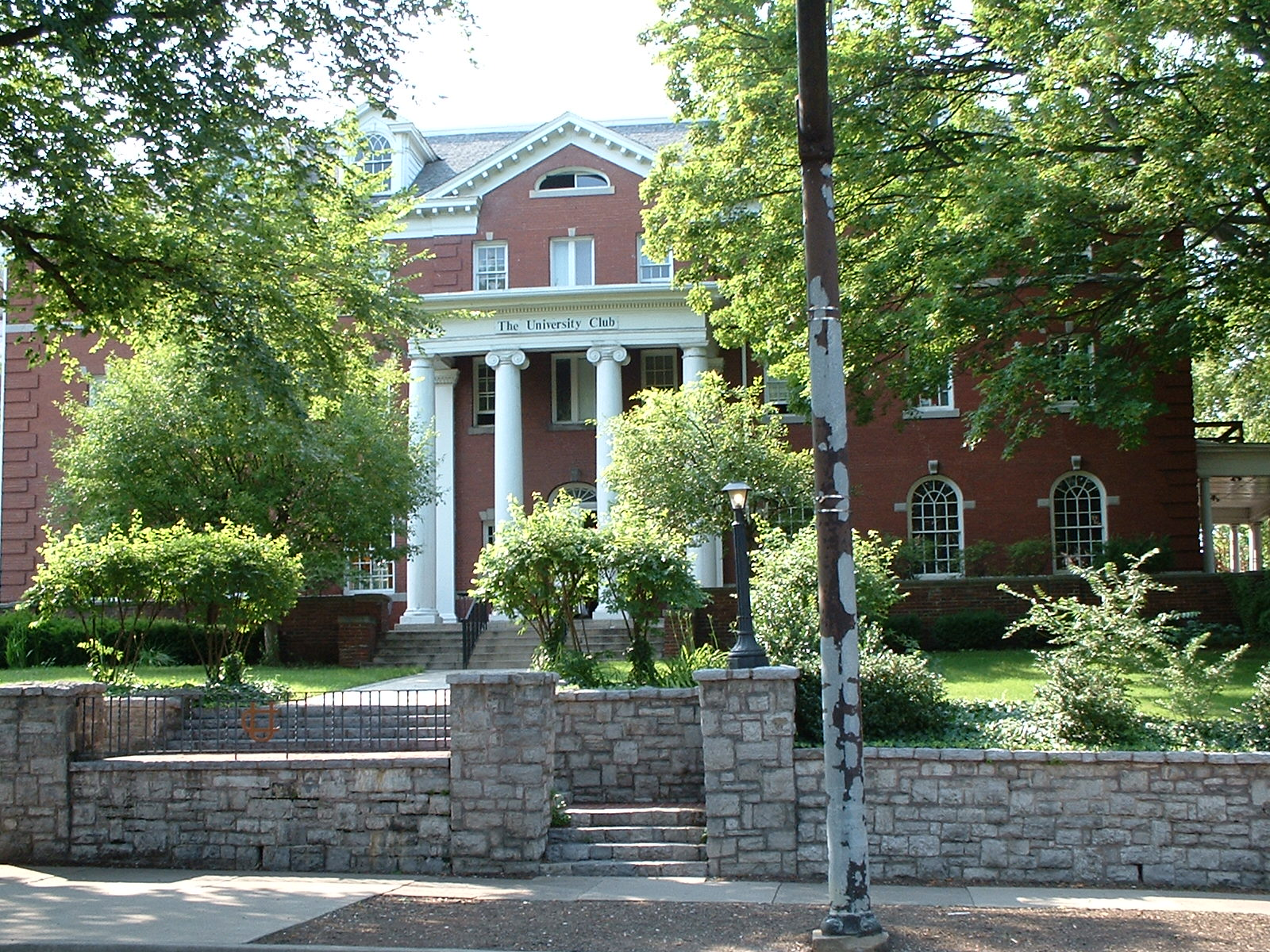
The University Club of State College
- Wilkes-Barre
  - The Westmoreland Club (1873)

=== Rhode Island ===
- East Providence
  - The Squantum Association (1870)
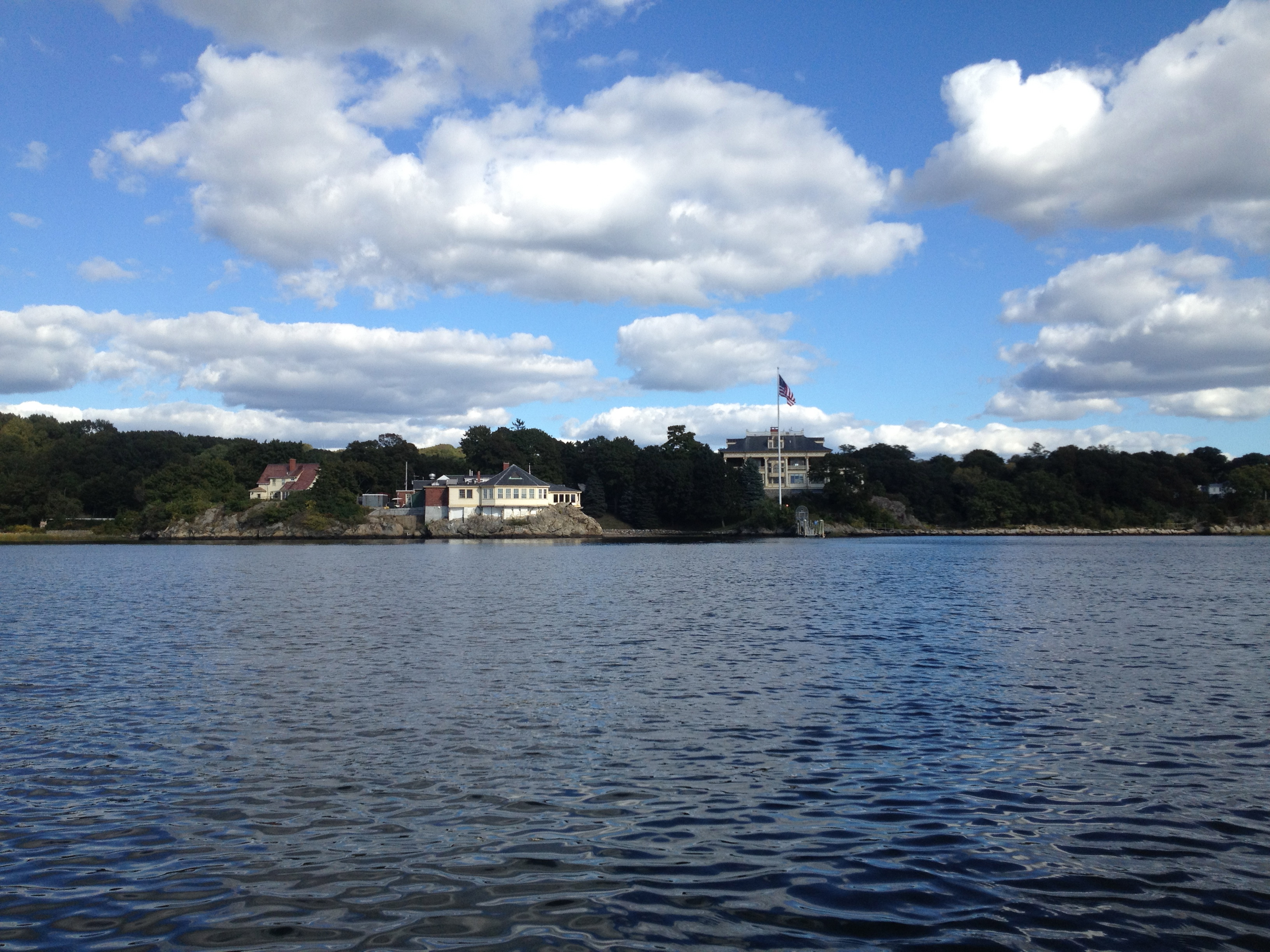
The Squantum Association
- Newport
  - The Clambake Club of Newport (1895)
  - The New York Yacht Club (1844) (summer station)
  - The Newport Reading Room (1854)
The Newport Reading Room
- Providence
  - The Hope Club (1875)
  - The University Club of Providence (1899)

=== South Carolina ===
- Aiken
  - The Aiken Tennis Club (1898)
  - The Green Boundary Club (1956)
- Camden
  - The Springdale Hall Club (1950)
- Charleston
  - The Charleston Club (1852)
- Columbia
  - The Palmetto Club (1956)
- Greenville
  - The Poinsett Club (1935)
- Hilton Head
  - Yacht Club of Hilton Head Island (1971)
- Rock Hill
  - The City Club of Rock Hill (1998)
- Spartanburg
  - The Piedmont Club (1941)

=== Tennessee ===
- Chattanooga
  - The Mountain City Club (1889)
  - The Walden Club (1975)
- Knoxville
  - The Bourbon Club (2019)
- Memphis
  - The Racquet Club of Memphis (1957)
  - The University Club of Memphis (1907)
- Nashville
  - The Nashville City Club (1957)

=== Texas ===
- Amarillo
  - The Amarillo Club (1947)
- Austin
  - The Austin Club (1949)
  - The Campus Club (1972)
  - The University Club
  - The Headliner's Club of Austin (1945)
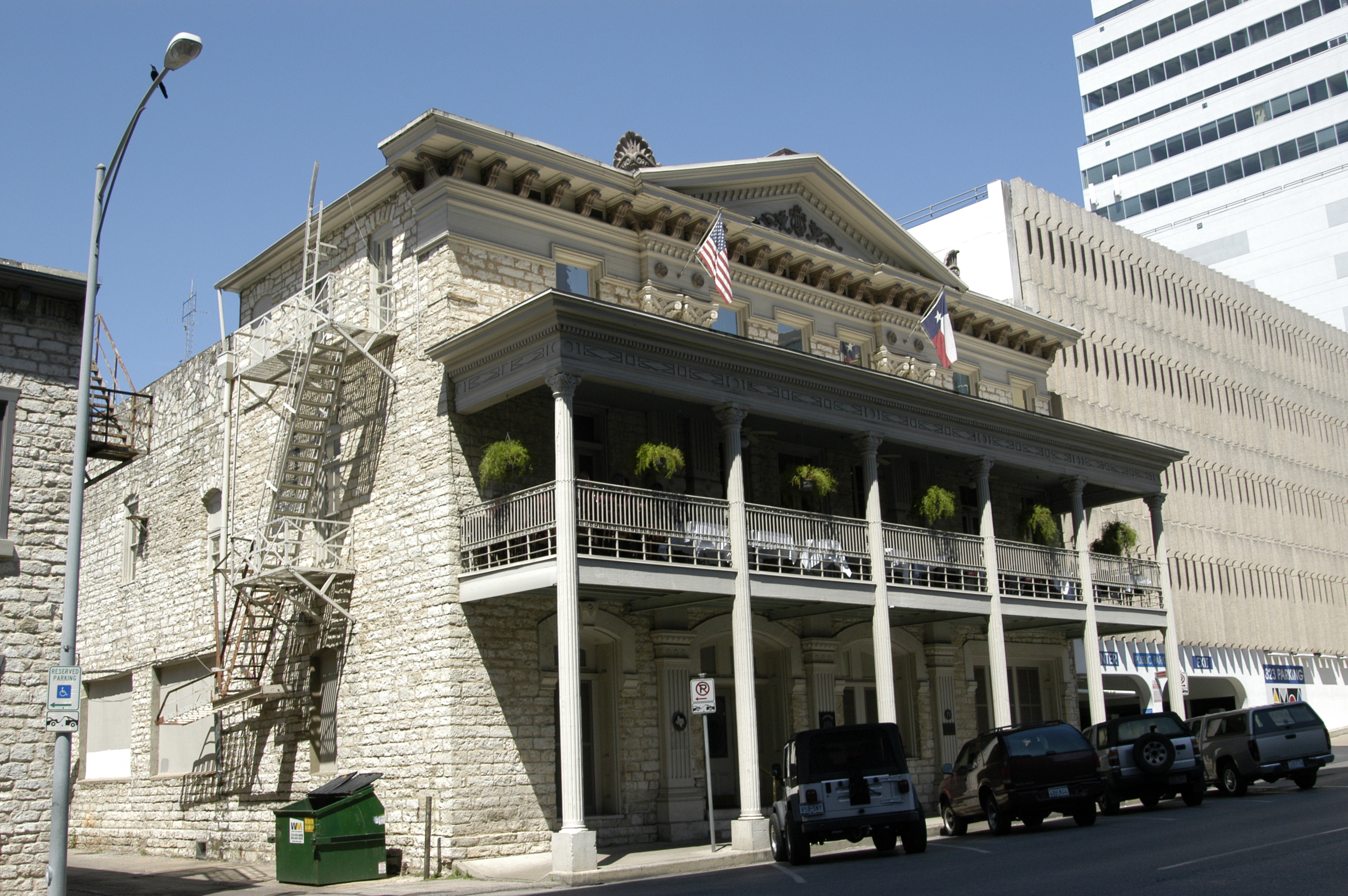
The Austin Club
- Beaumont
  - The Beaumont Club (1921)
- Dallas
  - The City Club (1918)
  - The Dallas Petroleum Club (1934)
  - The Faculty Club of Southern Methodist University (1921)
  - The Park City Club (1984)
  - Salesmanship Club of Dallas (1920)
- El Paso
  - The El Paso Club (1963)
- Fort Worth
  - The City Club of Fort Worth (1984)
  - The Fort Worth Club (1885), named the Commercial Club until 1906
  - The Petroleum Club of Fort Worth (1953)
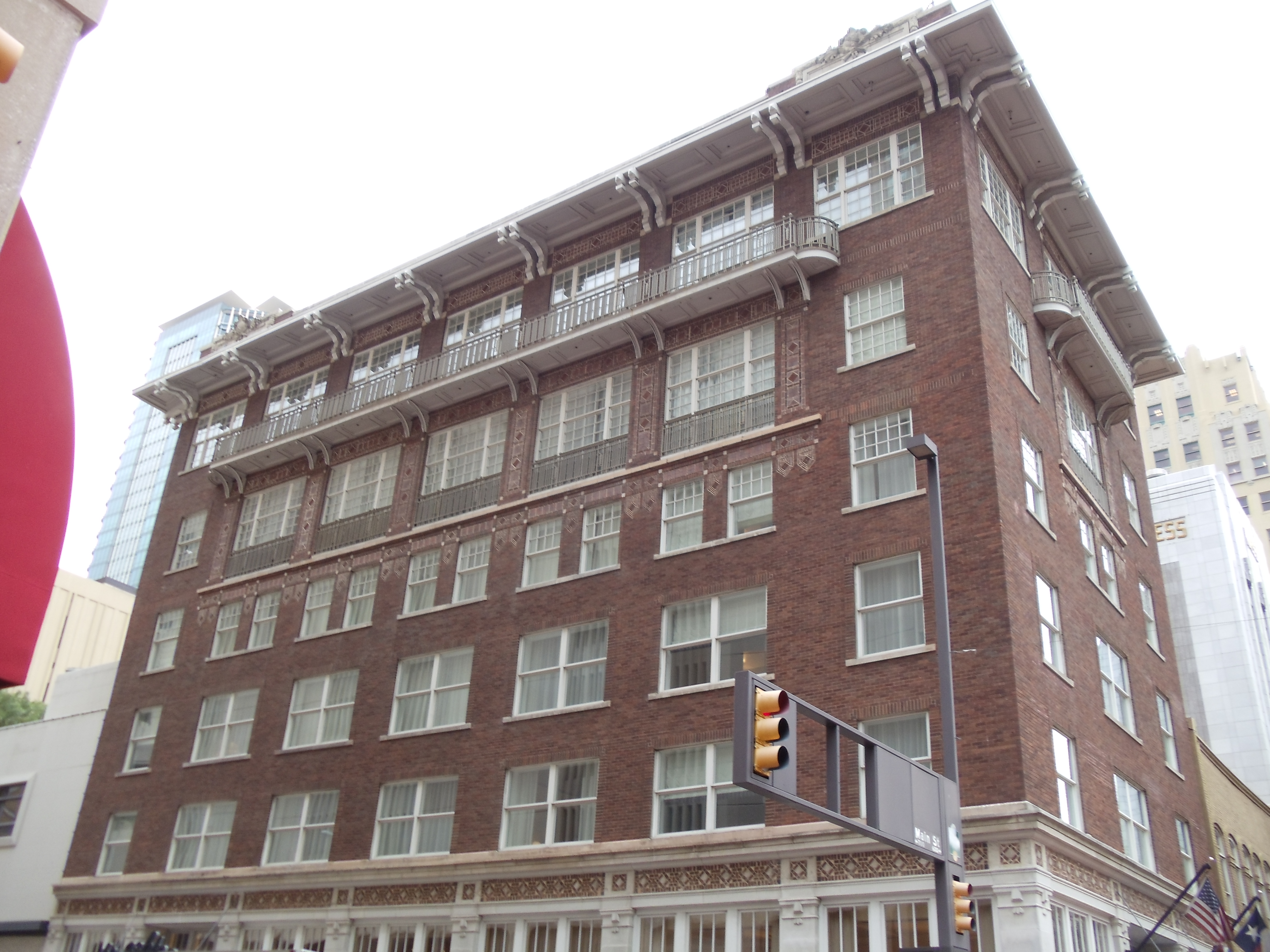
The Fort Worth Club
- Houston
  - The Briar Club (1949)
  - The Coronado Club (1956)
  - The Houston Club (1894)
  - The Petroleum Club of Houston (1946)
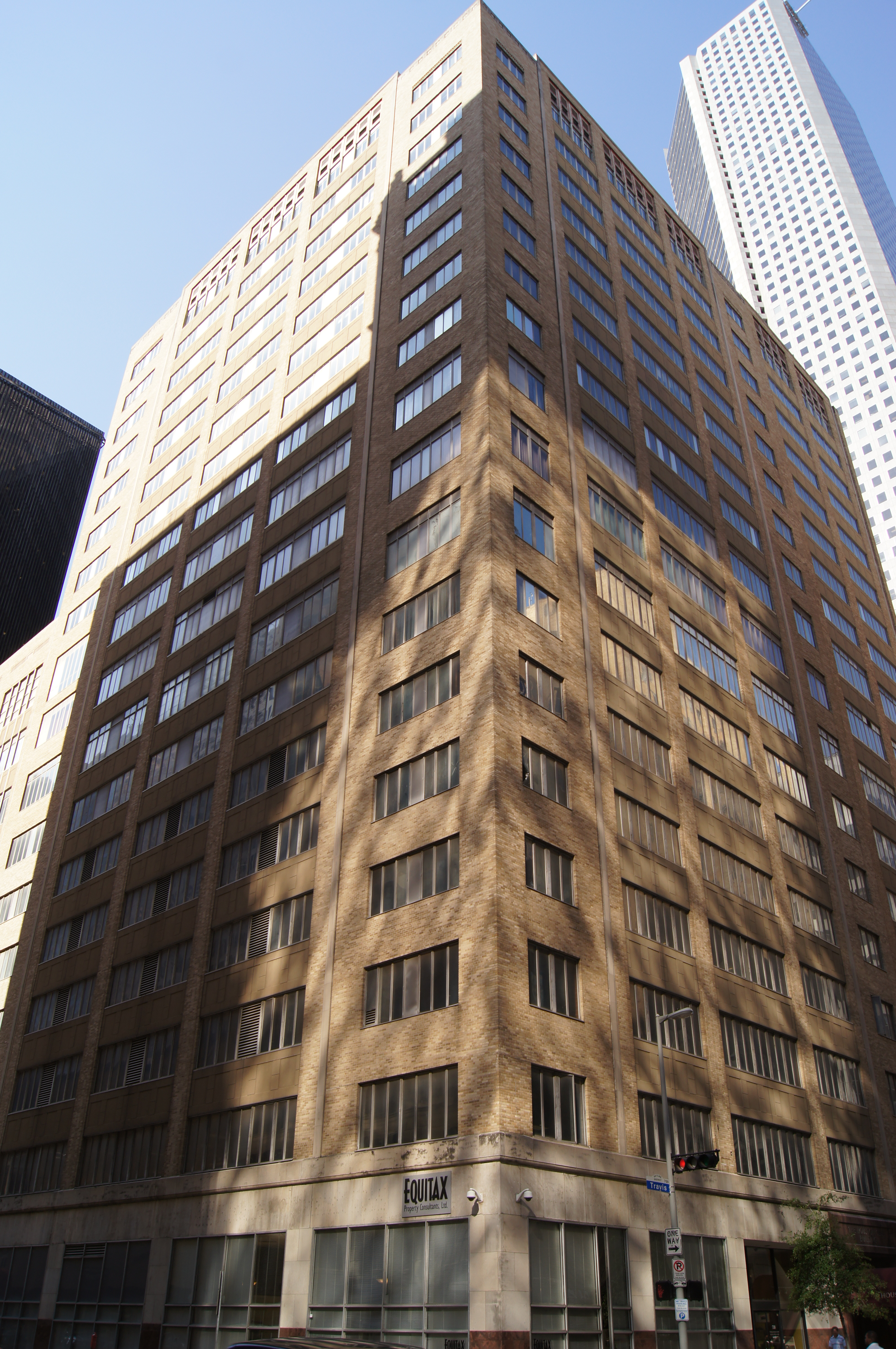
The Houston Club
- Longview
  - The Summit Club (1980)
- Midland
  - The Petroleum Club of Midland (1947)
- San Antonio
  - The Argyle Club (1955)
  - Club Giraud (1983)
  - The Petroleum Club of San Antonio (1980)

=== Utah ===
- Salt Lake City
  - The Alta Club (1883)
The Alta Club

=== Virginia ===
- Charlottesville
  - Red-land Club (1905)
  - The Colonnade Club (1907)
- Norfolk
  - The Virginia Club (1873)
- Richmond
  - The Commonwealth Club (1890)
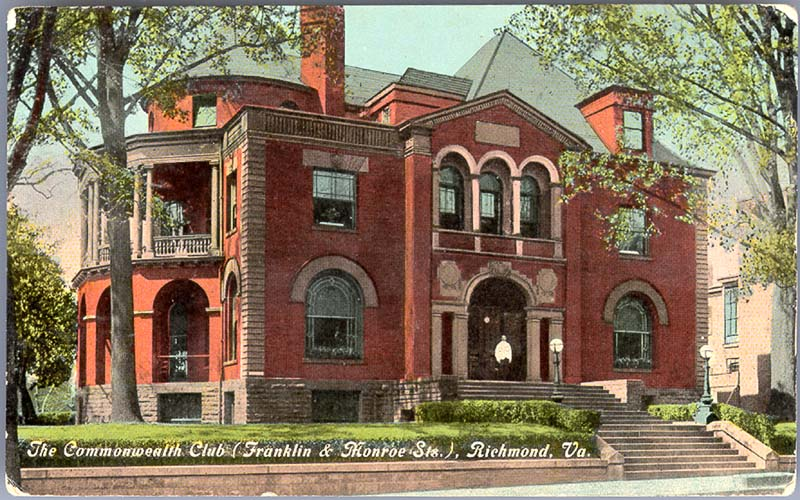
The Commonwealth Club
- Roanoke
  - The Shenandoah Club (1893) is the oldest, continuously operating private club in Virginia.
- Virginia Beach
  - The Town Center City Club (2003)
- Warrenton
  - The Fauquier Club (1902)

=== Washington ===
- Bellevue
  - The Harbor Club (1959)
  - The Bellevue Club (1979)
- Seattle
  - The College Club of Seattle (1910)
  - The Rainier Club (1888)
  - The University Club of Seattle (1900)
  - The University of Washington Club (1913)
  - The Washington Athletic Club (1930)
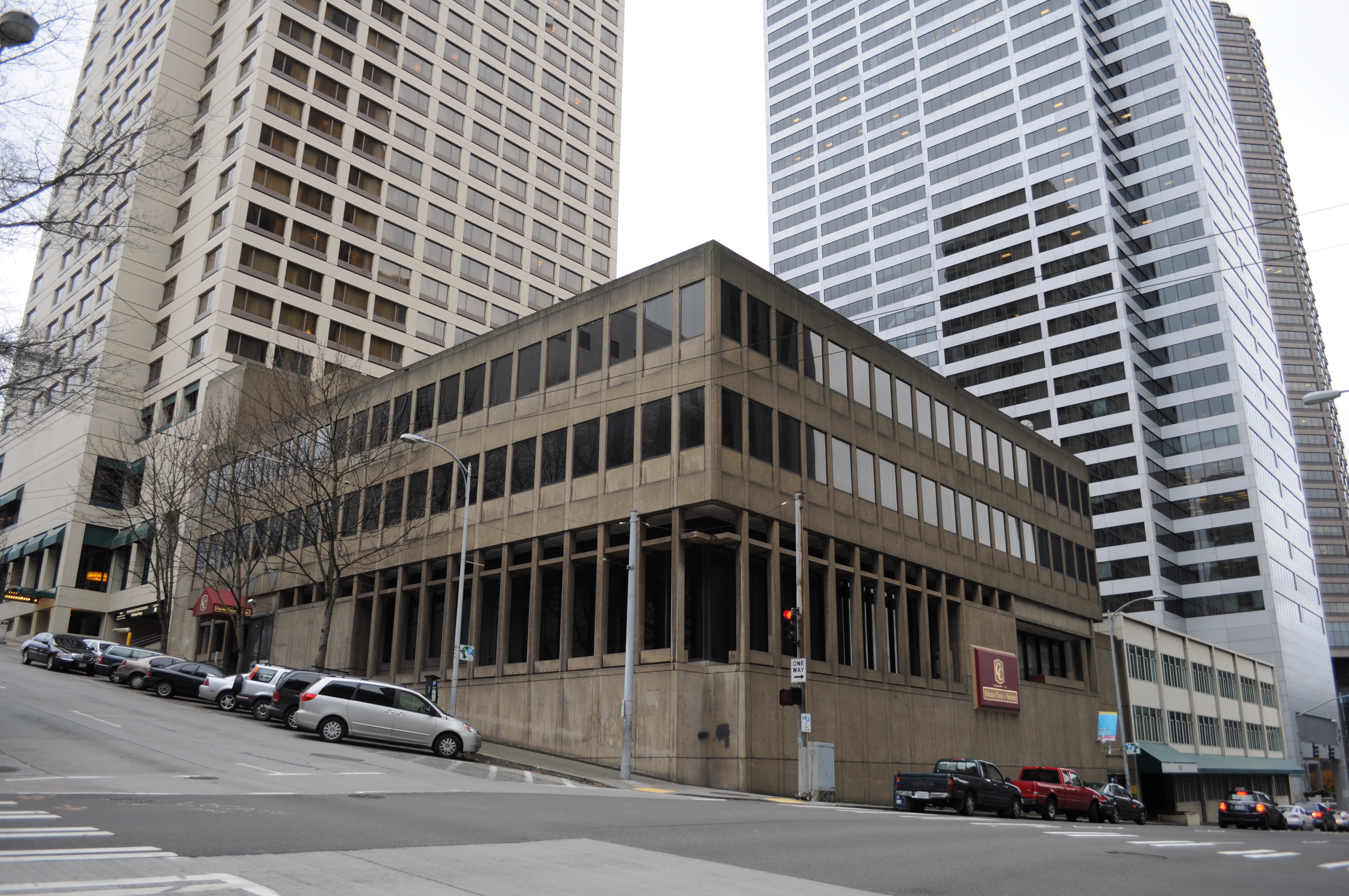
The College Club of Seattle (1954–2013)

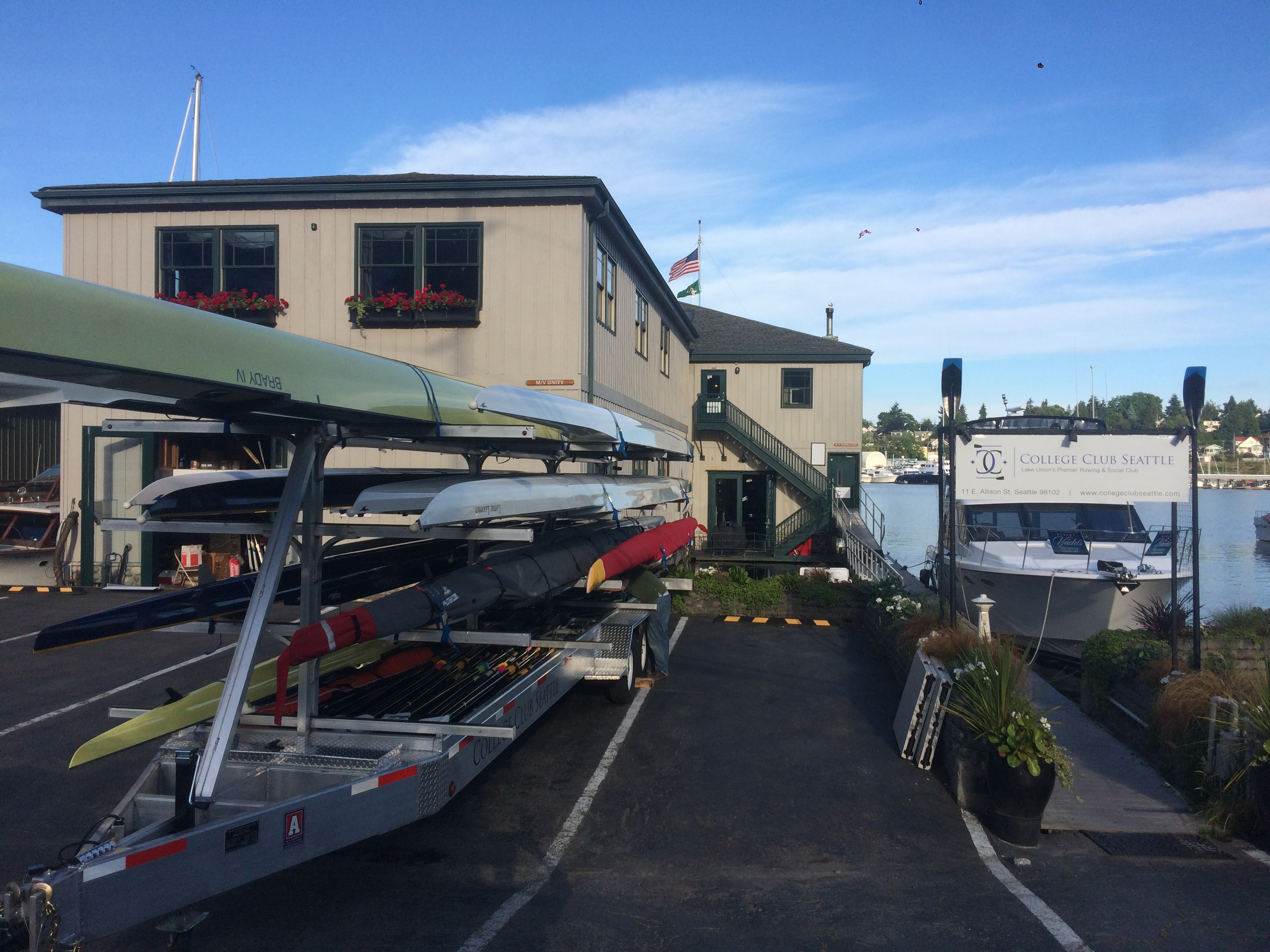
The College Club of Seattle (2013–present)

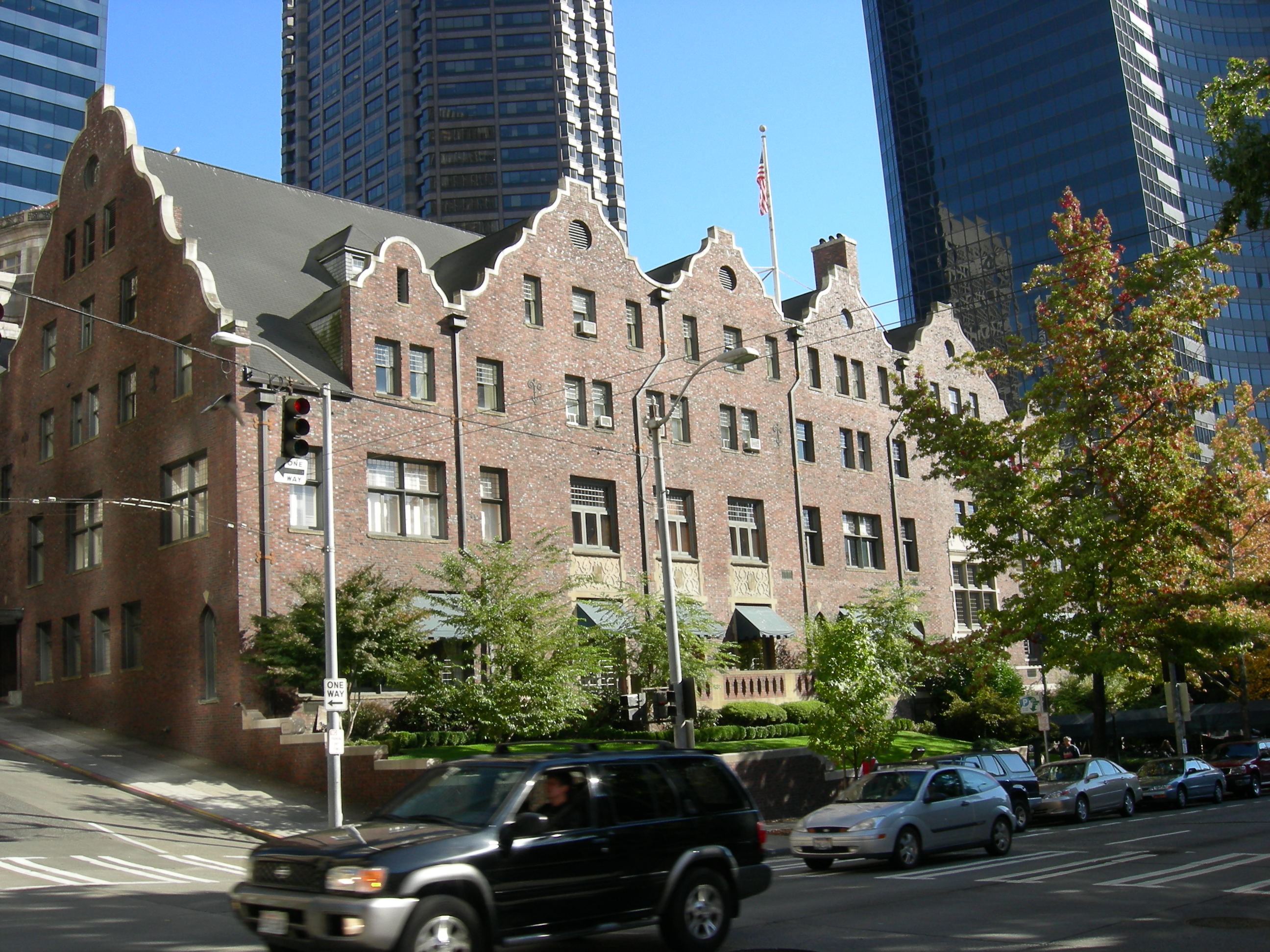
The Rainier Club

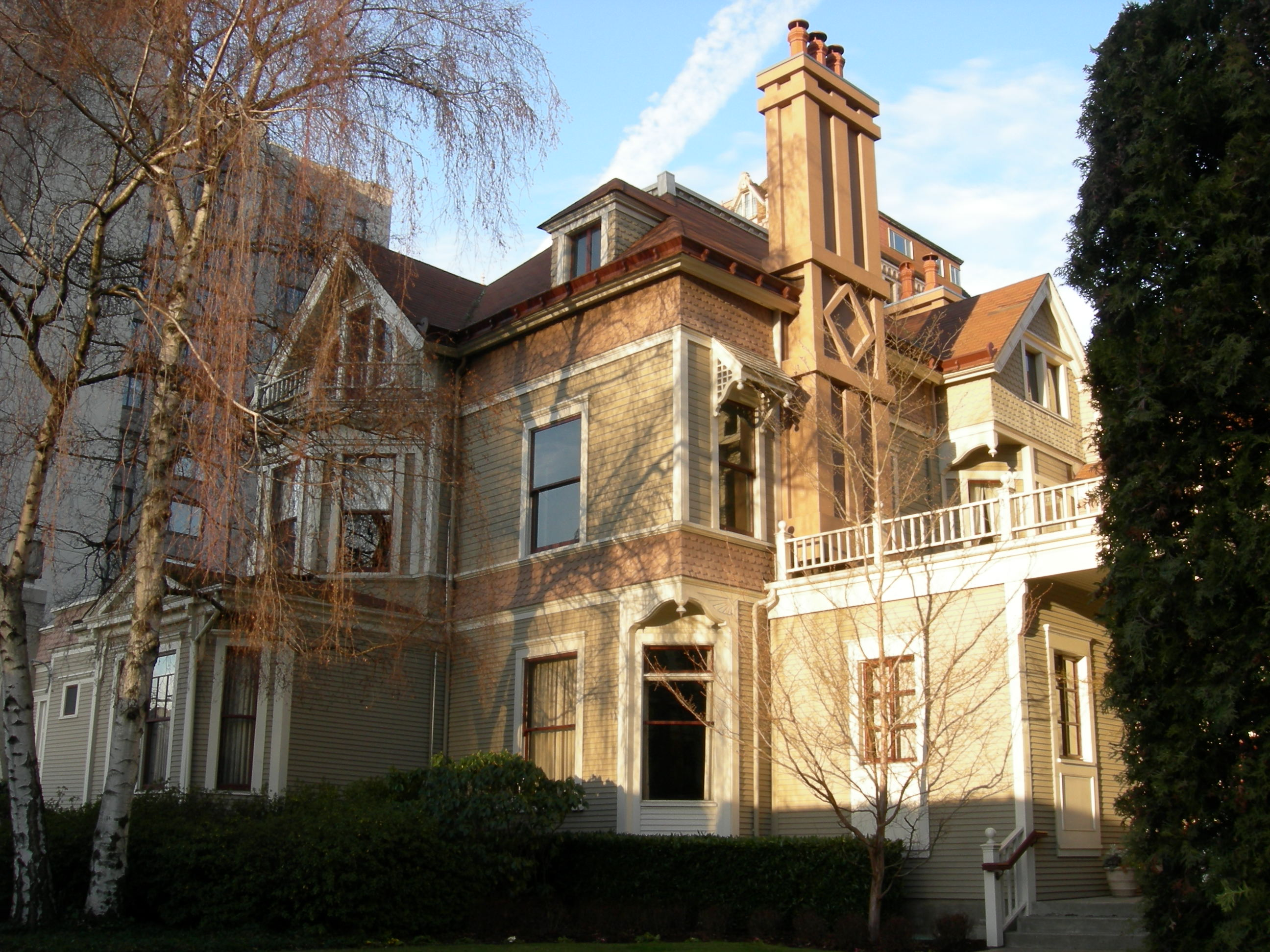
The University Club of Seattle

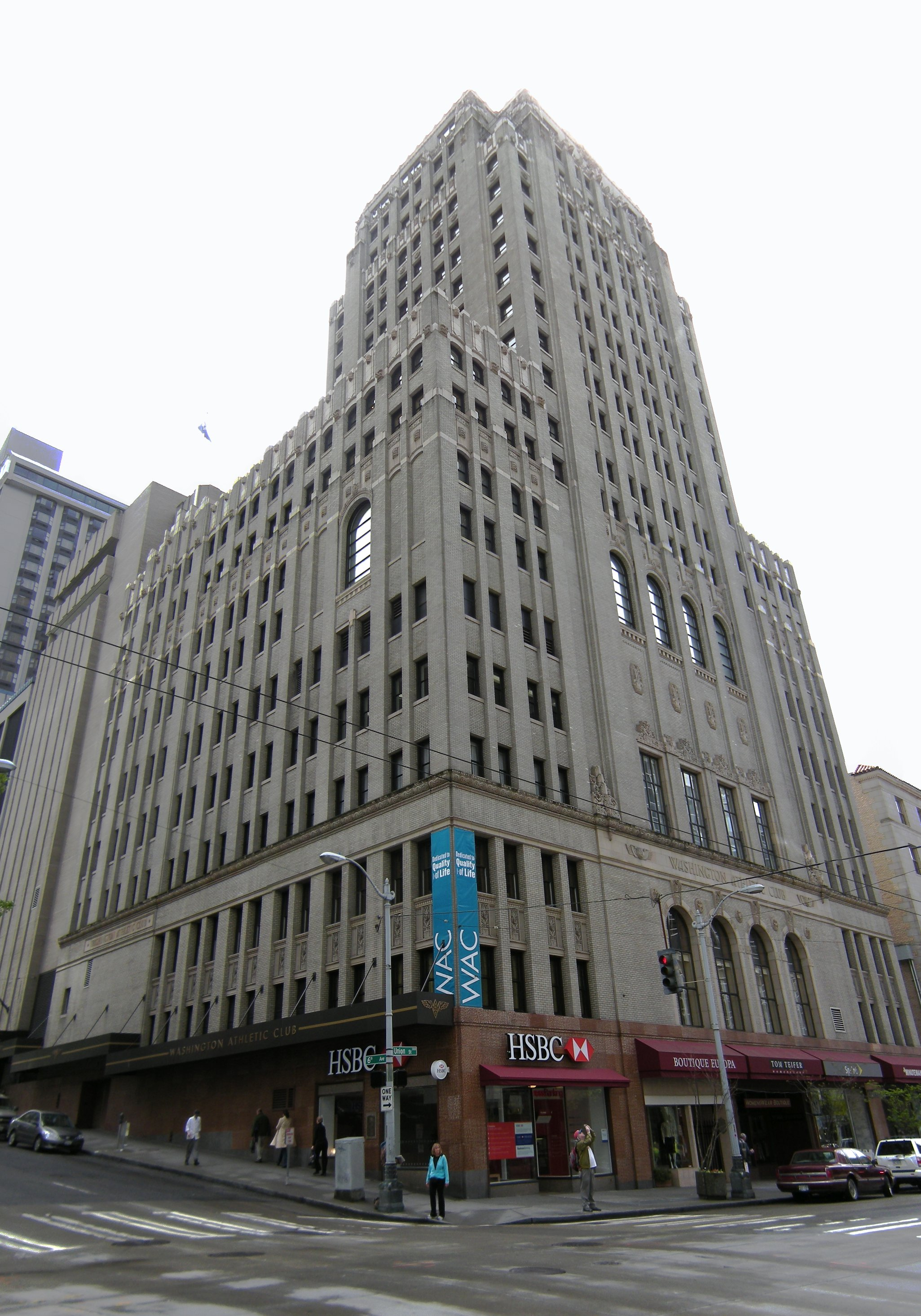
The Washington Athletic Club
- Spokane
  - The Spokane Club (1890)
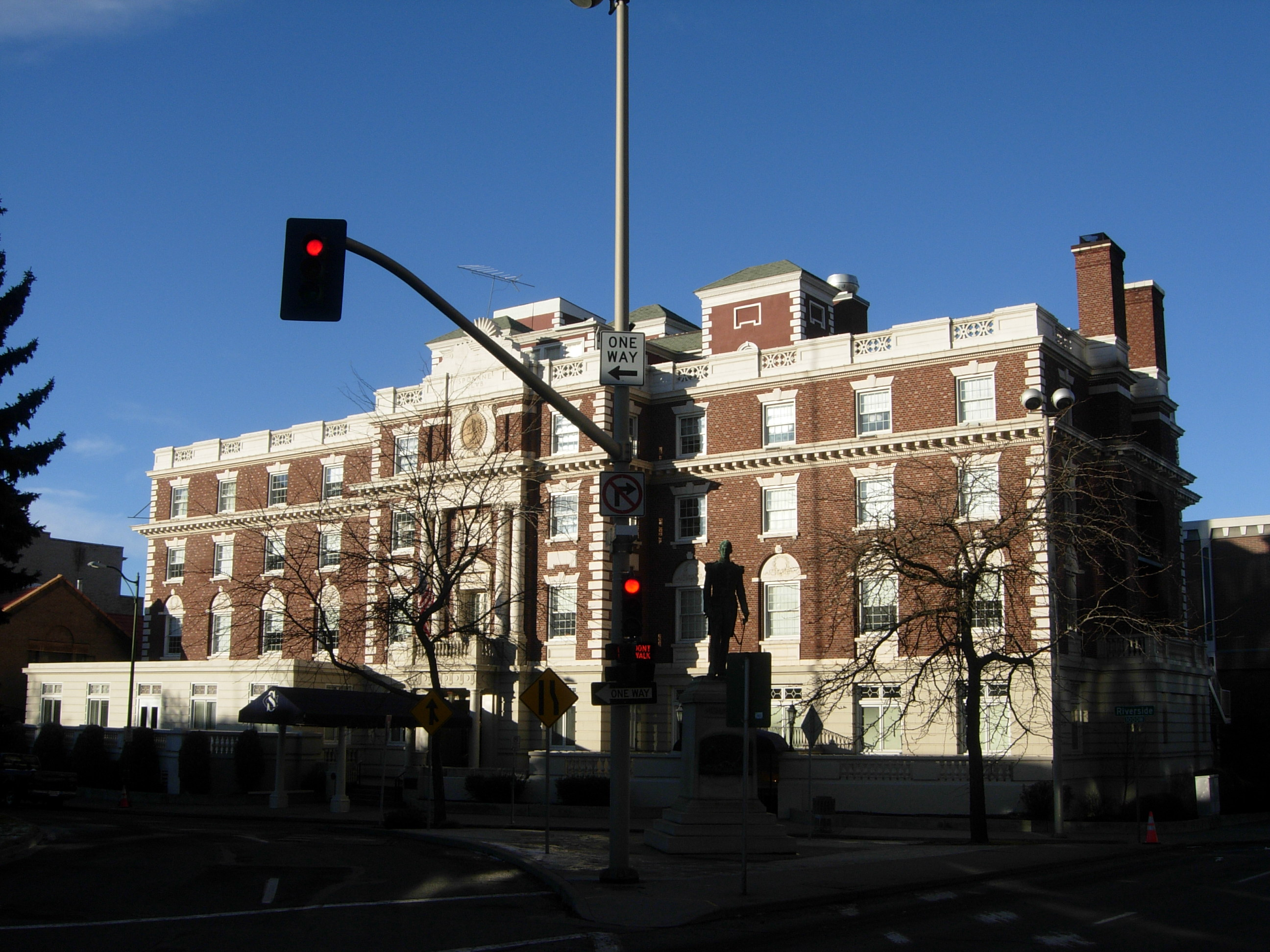
The Spokane Club

=== Wisconsin ===
- La Crosse
  - The La Crosse Club (1882)
- Madison
  - The Madison Club (1909)
  - The University Club of the University of Wisconsin (1906)
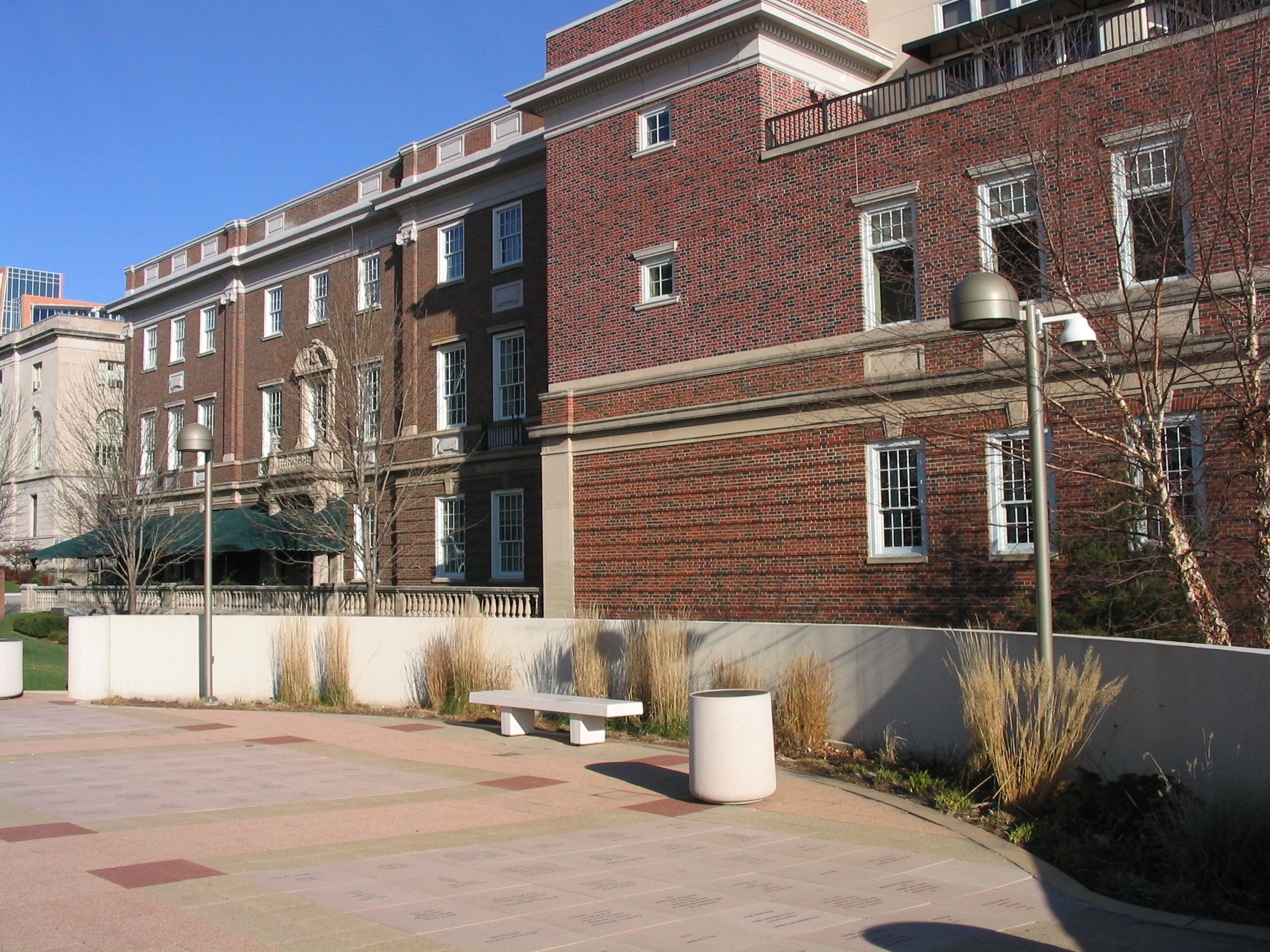
The Madison Club
- Milwaukee
  - The Milwaukee Athletic Club (1882)
  - The Milwaukee Club (1882)
  - The University Club of Milwaukee (1898)
  - The Wisconsin Club (formerly the Deutscher Club) (1891)
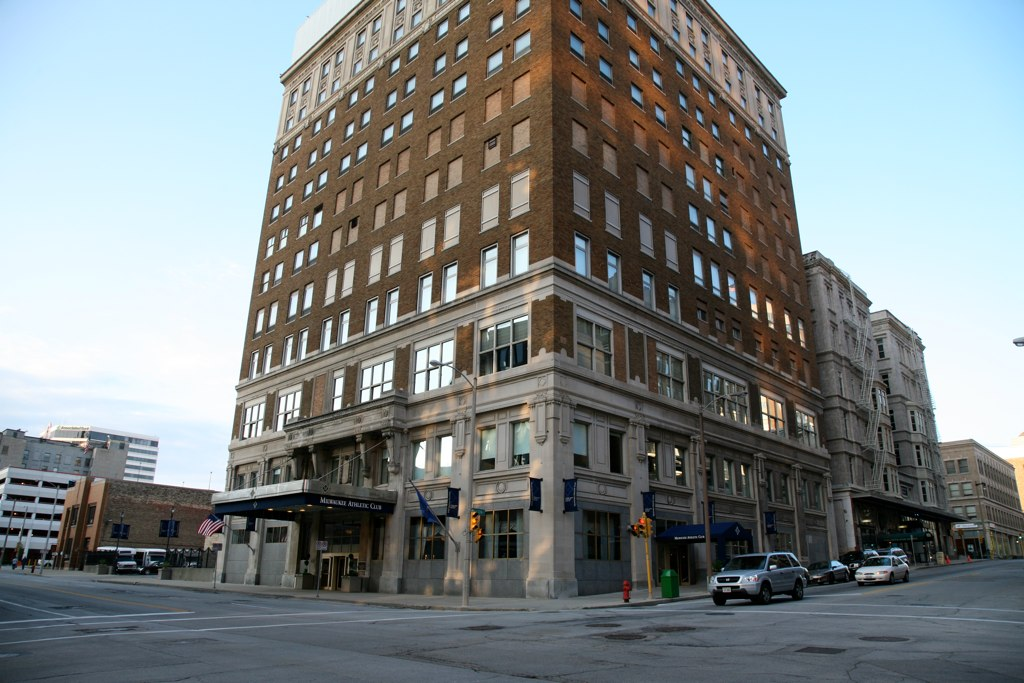
The Milwaukee Athletic Club

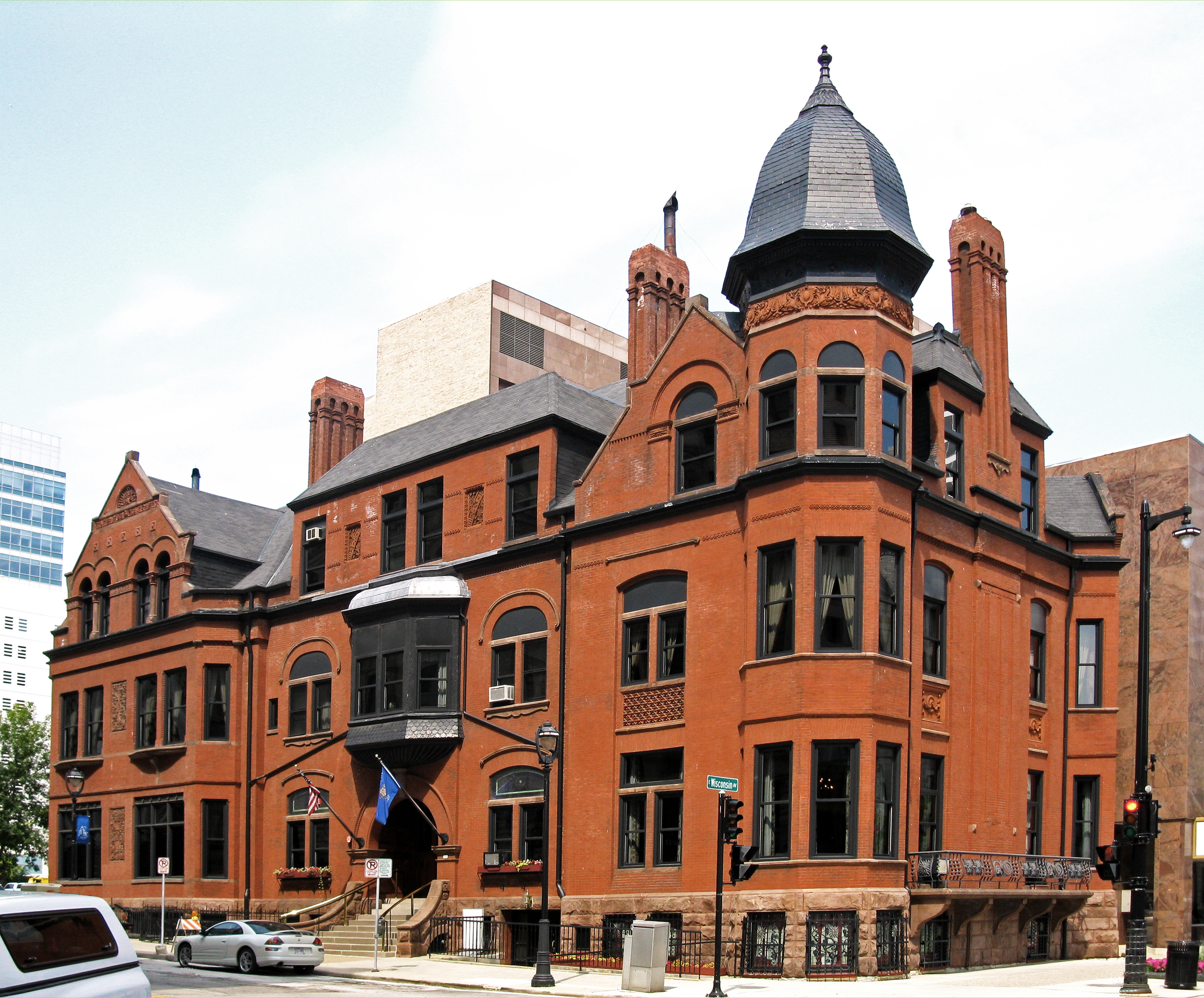
The Milwaukee Club

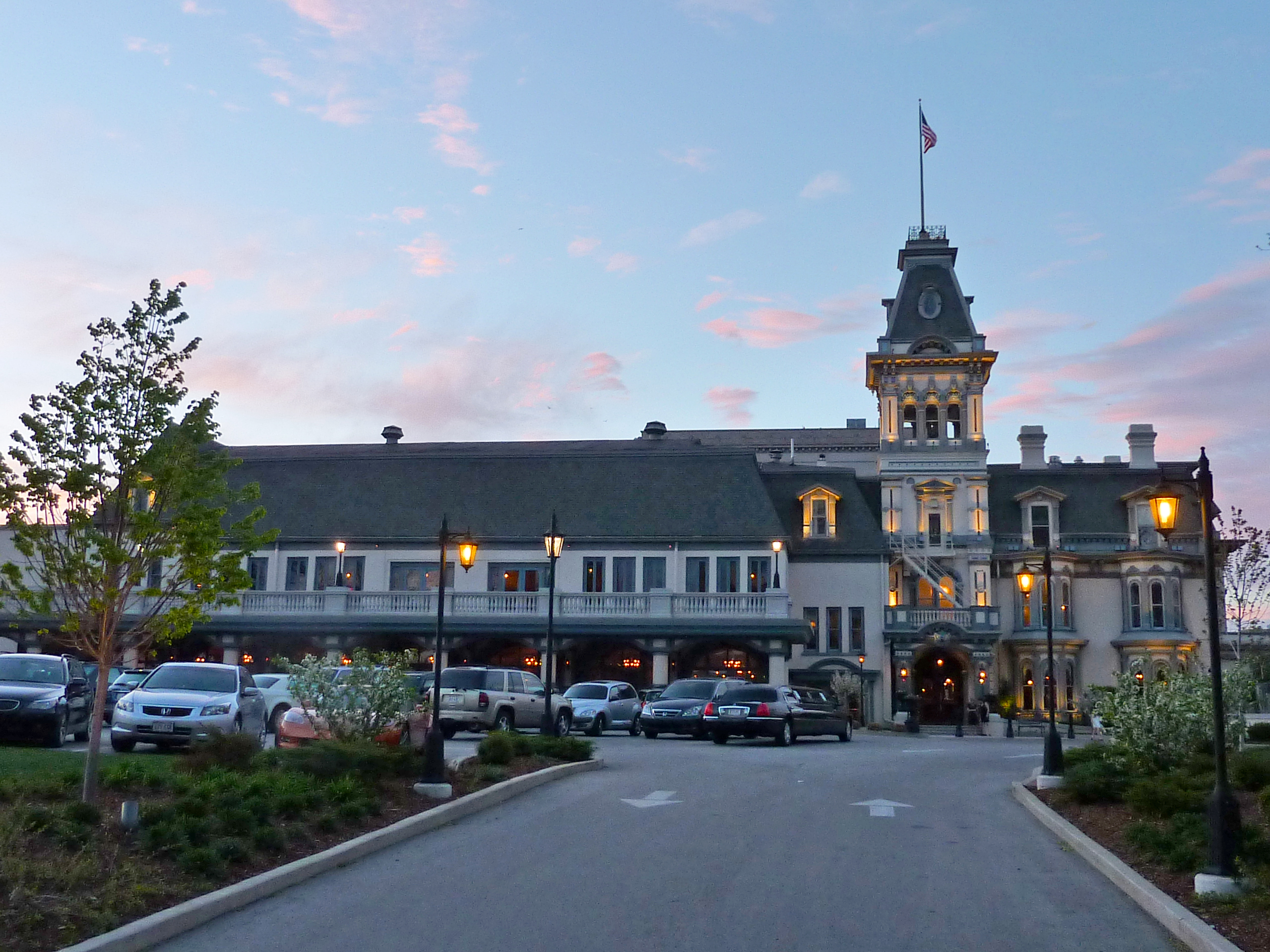
The Wisconsin Club
- Racine
  - The Somerset Club (1892)

== See also ==
- List of gentlemen's clubs in India
- List of gentlemen's clubs in London
- List of gentlemen's clubs in Sri Lanka
- List of traditional gentlemen's and working men's club buildings
- Membership discrimination in California clubs
- List of women's club buildings
