= University Club =

University Club or Faculty Club may refer to:

== Americas ==
Canada

- University Club of Toronto, Toronto
- University Club of Montreal, Quebec

Mexico

- University Club (Mexico City)

United States

- University Club (Portland, Oregon)
- University Club (Rochester, New York)
- University Club (University of Pittsburgh), Pennsylvania
- University Club of Baton Rouge, Louisiana
- University Club of Chicago, Illinois
- University Club of Jacksonville, Florida
- University Club of Kansas City (1901–2001), which merged into the Kansas City Club
- University Club of Kentucky, Lexington, Kentucky
- University Club of Milwaukee, Wisconsin
- University Club of New York, New York
- University Club of San Francisco, California
- University Club of Washington, DC

== Europe ==
Greece

- University Club of NKUA, Athens

== See also ==
- Berkeley Faculty Club
- Columbia University Club of New York
- Cornell Club of New York
- Harvard Club of Boston
- Harvard Club of New York City
- Harvard Faculty Club
- Penn Club of New York
- Princeton Club of New York
- The Yale Club of New York City
- Williams Club
- List of gentlemen's clubs in the United States
