= Williams Club =

Coordinates: 40.750551°N 73.980237°W

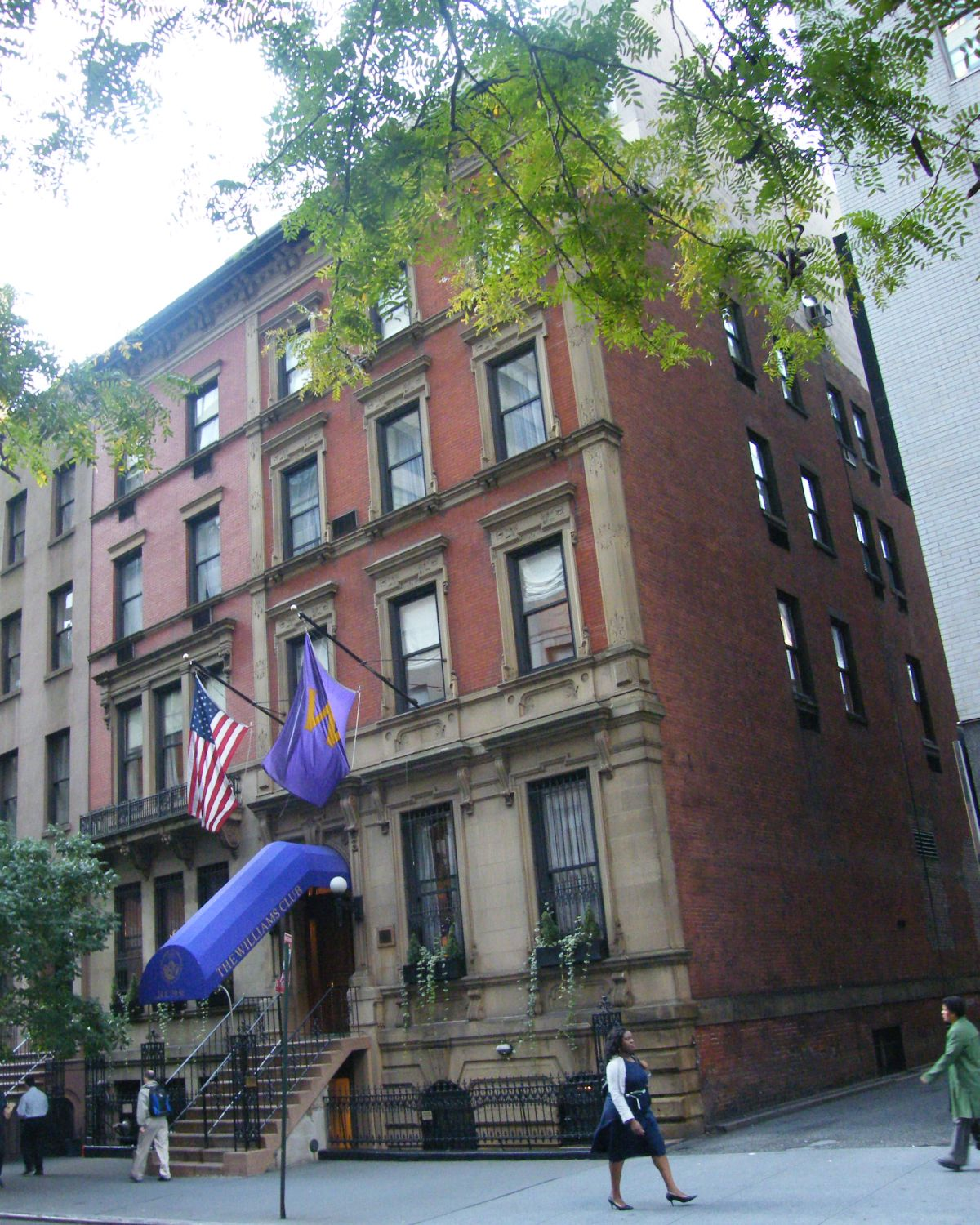
The former clubhouse at 39th Street

The Williams Club is in residence at the Penn Club of New York for alumni of Williams College. Until 2010, it had its own private clubhouse at 39th Street, which today operates as an unaffiliated boutique hotel. The club has the tax status 501(c)(7) Social and Recreation Clubs; in 2023 it claimed $42,000 in total revenue and total assets of $17,631.

== History ==
The Williams Club was founded in 1913 by Williams alumni in New York City as a place to socialize. The club was originally located at 291 Madison Avenue in a building donated by Mary Clark Thompson, wife of Williams alumnus Frederick Ferris Thompson.

In 1921, it moved to 24 East 39th Street in Manhattan, which it then renovated in 1988. On June 1, 2010, however, the Williams Club ceased operating on its own and moved its membership program and related activities to the Princeton Club.

After the permanent closure of the Princeton Club in fall 2021, the Williams Club moved to the Penn Club in March 2022. Today, members and their guests can use the Penn Club's facilities.

== Membership ==
Although the club is primarily made up of Williams alumni, membership categories also include Affiliate Membership and Associate Membership. Affiliate Membership is available to graduates, faculty members or senior administrators of 35 institutions, many of which are small liberal arts colleges such as Williams itself. Associate Membership is available to individuals with a BA from an accredited school and the sponsorship of a current member.

== See also ==
- Columbia University Club of New York
- Cornell Club of New York
- Harvard Club of New York City
- The Yale Club of New York City
- List of American gentlemen's clubs
