= Harvard Club of Boston =

Private social club in Boston, Massachusetts

Coordinates: 42°20′55.4″N 71°5′21.1″W

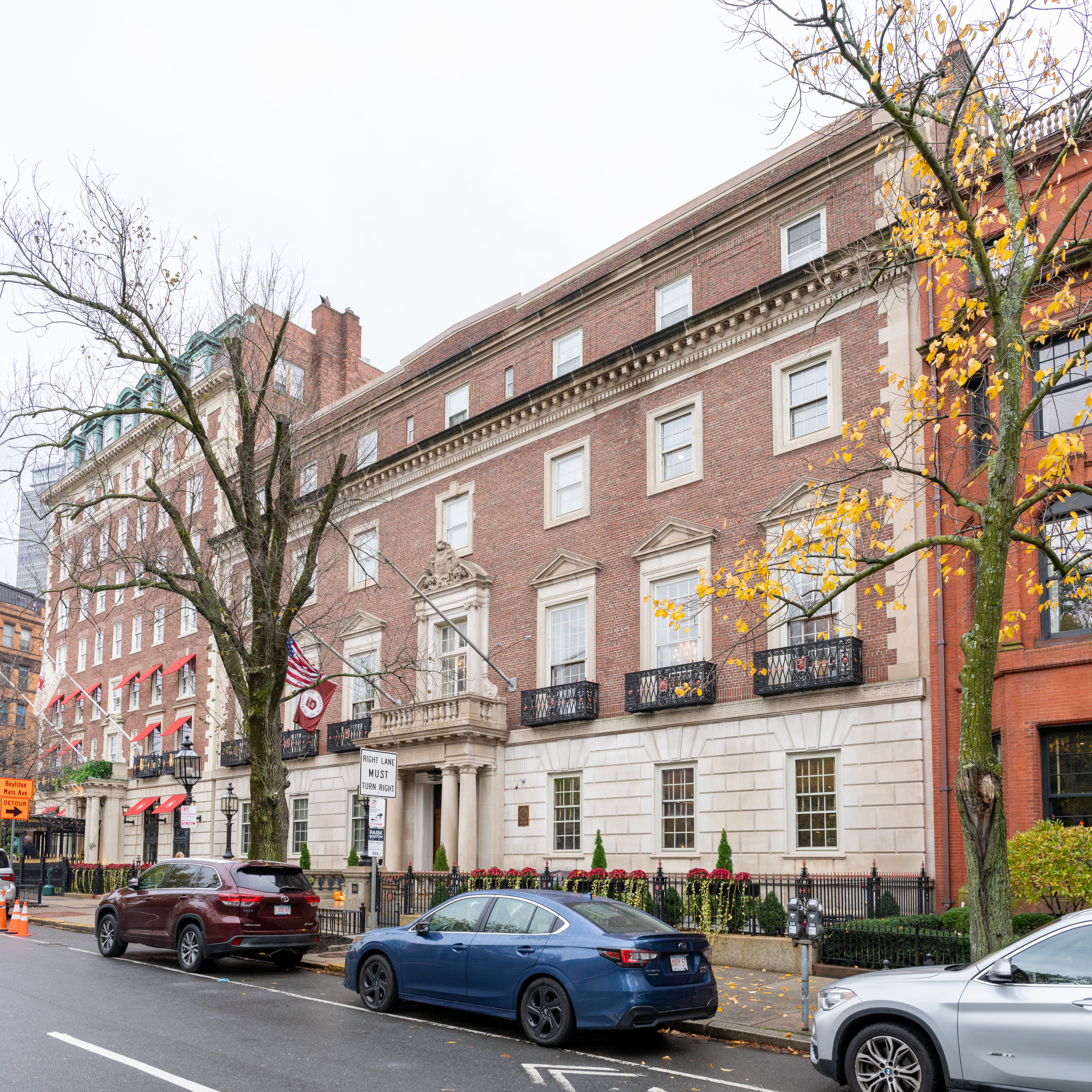
- Back Bay Clubhouse (2025)
- Formation: 1908; 118 years ago
- Type: Private social club
- Headquarters: Boston, Massachusetts, U.S.
- Region served: Greater Boston
- Affiliations: Harvard University; though an independently operated alumni club
- Website: www.harvardclub.com

The Harvard Club of Boston is a private social club located in Boston, Massachusetts, United States. Its membership is open to alumni and associates of Harvard University, Massachusetts Institute of Technology, Yale University, and Fletcher School of Law and Diplomacy at Tufts University. The Back Bay Clubhouse is located in Boston's historic Back Bay neighborhood, at 374 Commonwealth Avenue.

== History ==
=== 20th century ===
The Harvard Club was founded by a group of 22 Harvard University alumni in 1908. The original dues were $5.00 per year, and by the end of the year, more than 1,200 members had joined. The first president, Henry Lee Higginson, was also the founder of the Boston Symphony Orchestra. In 1909, the Club established its first scholarships, awarding grants of $200 to local high school students who would be attending Harvard. One of the first recipients of these scholarships, James Bryant Conant, went on to become the 23rd president of Harvard. In 1912–1913, the Club decided to construct a clubhouse, the Back Bay Clubhouse at 374 Commonwealth Avenue. In 1925, eight squash courts were built. During the Great Depression, the Club acted as an employment agency, posting a list of positions needed by members who were out of a job. During World War II, cots were placed in these courts, and lodging was offered to military officers at the cost of $1.50 per night.

In 1971, women, once limited to dining in the women's annex while the men dined in Harvard Hall, were welcomed as full and active members for the first time in the Club's history. In 1976, the Downtown Clubhouse was purchased at One Federal Street, providing a location more convenient to most of Boston's offices.

=== 21st century ===
In 2003, the Downtown Clubhouse underwent a $2.5 million renovation. In 2015, a $16 million renovation of the Back Bay Clubhouse was completed, providing members with new dining spaces, a wine room, enhanced function and member spaces, renovated overnight rooms, a new elevator, and an upgraded athletics center.

In 2016, after 108 years, the Club elected its first female President, Karen Van Winkle, a Harvard College alumnus and native of Cambridge, Massachusetts. Ms. Van Winkle's three-year term ushered in a new era for the organization as it grows and diversifies its membership and enhances its presence in Greater Boston.

In 2016, the Club was named a Platinum Club of America, an award given to only the top 4% of private clubs nationwide. In 2017, Harvard Hall at the Back Bay Clubhouse was named "Best Ballroom" in the city by Boston magazine. And, in 2018, the Club was named a Platinum Club of the World – the only private city club in New England to achieve this distinction. The Club presently includes approximately 5,000 members living in 40 countries around the globe.

==== Fine for PPP fraud ====
The Harvard Club of Boston agreed in January 2026 to pay approximately $2.4 million to resolve allegations by the U.S. Department of Justice that it violated the False Claims Act. The club admitted that on May 4, 2021, it applied for and certified its eligibility for a first-draw Paycheck Protection Program (PPP) loan under the CARES Act, later receiving full forgiveness from the Small Business Administration (SBA), despite being ineligible due to its status as a private membership club that restricts membership based on criteria other than capacity, in accordance with longstanding SBA guidance excluding such entities from PPP loans.

The settlement, which credited the club's cooperation with the investigation, resolved a qui tam lawsuit filed by whistleblower Daniel Foster, from which Foster received approximately $247,219.

== Notable speakers ==
Notable people to have spoken at the Club include Dick Cheney, John Foster Dulles, Robert Frost, Buckminster Fuller, Henry Kissinger, Eleanor Roosevelt, and William Taft.

== Mission statement ==
To be the social, intellectual, and athletic hub of Harvard alumni and our affiliated community in the Greater Boston area.

== Membership ==
Alumni from undergraduate and graduate schools of Harvard University are eligible for membership. Alumni from Yale University, The Fletcher School of Diplomacy at Tufts University, and the Massachusetts Institute of Technology are eligible, too. Harvard alumni, students, and faculty, as well as Yale & Fletcher School of Diplomacy alumni, are eligible for full Harvard Club memberships. Squash and Fitness memberships are available for an additional fee. Like most private clubs, members of the Harvard Club are given reciprocal benefits at over 140 clubs around the United States and the world.

== Back Bay Clubhouse ==
The Clubhouse's facilities include ClubPub, the Veritas restaurant and lounge, 25 guest rooms, four squash courts, a fitness center, and numerous function rooms, including Harvard Hall, which has hosted events ranging from weddings to corporate events and member-only events. Dress code is business casual for members and guests. Appropriate denim pants (not torn, frayed, or excessively worn) are acceptable at the Club.

== Higginson 1908 Foundation ==
The Harvard Club maintains a Foundation, with a separate Board of Directors from the club's Board of Governors, which oversees assets in excess of $10 million. The purpose of the Foundation is to help sustain the Club's mission to support deserving Boston area students, fund historically significant improvements to the Back Bay Clubhouse, preserve and maintain the Club's art collection, and develop programming that advances the Club and University's reputation. The Foundation also supports the University's undergraduate admissions program by hosting receptions for admitted students, as well as sponsoring the Prize Book program. In 2008, the Foundation donated $510,944 to undergraduate financial aid.

== See also ==
- Columbia University Club of New York
- Cornell Club of New York
- Harvard Club of New York City
- Harvard Club of Washington DC
- List of American gentlemen's clubs
- Oxford and Cambridge Club
- Penn Club of New York City
- Princeton Club of New York
- Yale Club of New York City
