= University Club Tower =

University Club Tower may refer to:

- University Club Tower (Milwaukee) in Milwaukee, Wisconsin
- University Club Tower (Tulsa) in Tulsa, Oklahoma

== See also ==
- University Club (disambiguation)
