= The Yale Club of New York City =

Private club in Manhattan, New York

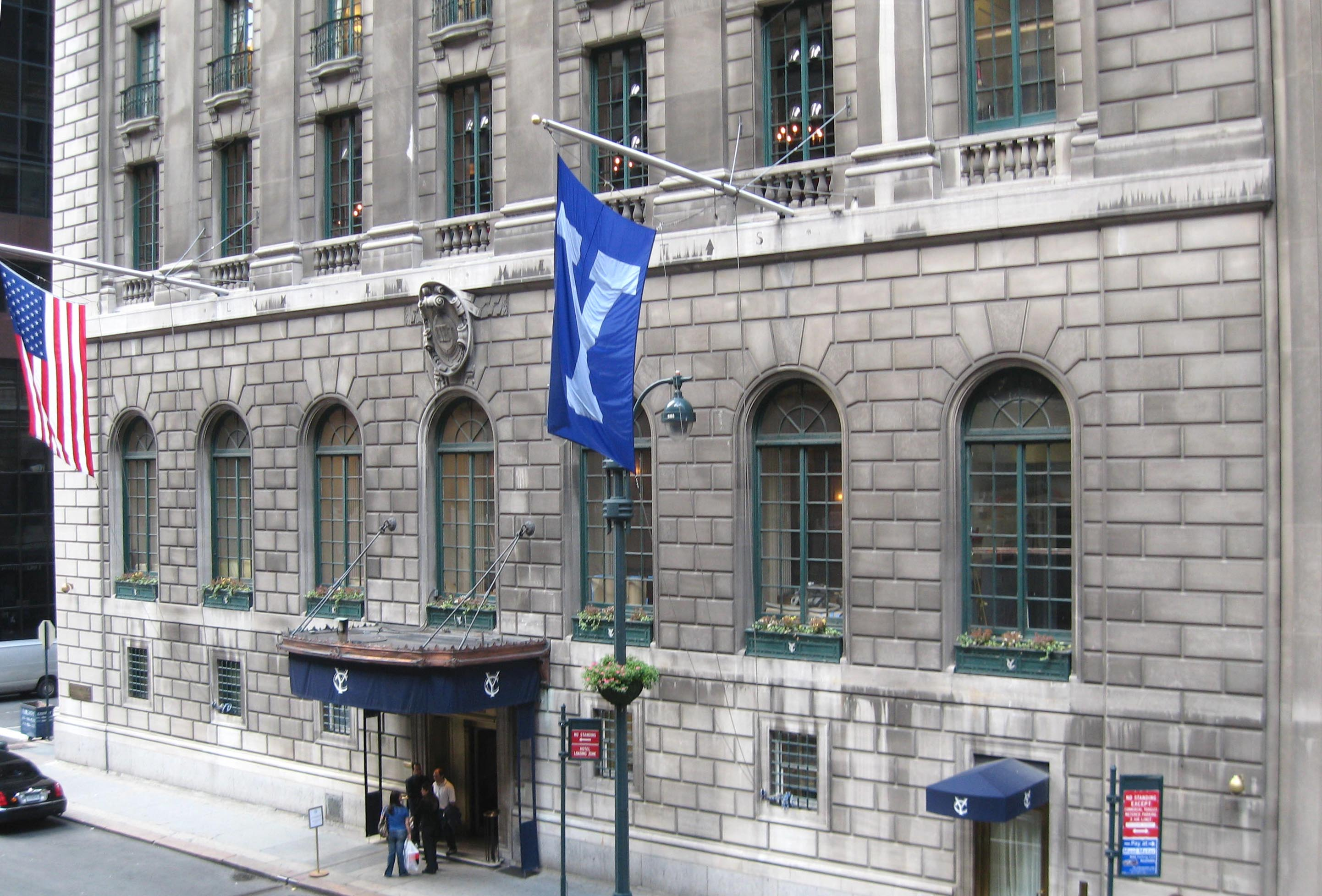
- Established: 1897; 129 years ago
- Type: Private social club
- Location(s): 50 Vanderbilt Avenue; New York, New York 10017
- Coordinates: 40°45′14″N 73°58′39″W
- Members: 11,000+ globally
- Affiliations: Yale University; though an independently operated alumni club
- Staff: 300
- Website: www.yaleclubnyc.org

The Yale Club of New York City, commonly called The Yale Club, is a private club in Midtown Manhattan, New York City. Its membership is restricted almost entirely to alumni and faculty of Yale University. The Yale Club has a worldwide membership of more than 11,000. The 22-story clubhouse at 50 Vanderbilt Avenue, opened in 1915, was the world's largest clubhouse upon its completion and is still the largest college clubhouse ever built.

== Clubhouse ==
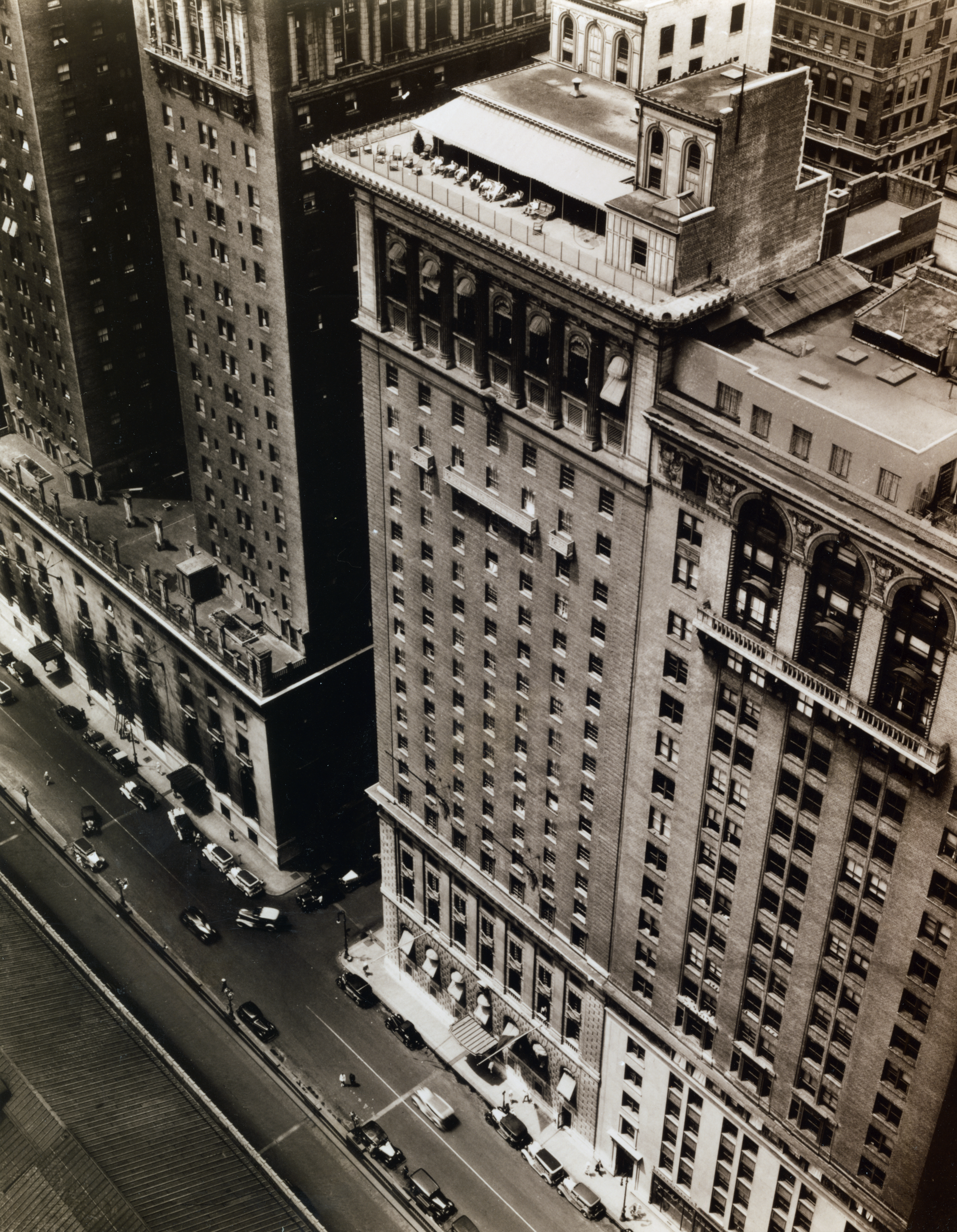
The Exterior of the Yale Club

The club is located at 50 Vanderbilt Avenue, at the intersection of East 44th Street, across Vanderbilt Avenue from Grand Central Terminal and the MetLife Building.

After the Penn Club of New York (est. 1901) became the first alumni clubhouse to join Clubhouse Row for inter-club events at 30 West 44th Street after Harvard Club of New York City (est. 1888) at 27 West 44th, then New York Yacht Club (est. 1899) at 37 West 44th, and Yale Club of New York City (est. 1915) on East 44th (and Vanderbilt) and Cornell Club of New York (est. 1989) at 6 East 44th on the same block, with Princeton Club of New York joining in 1963 at 15 West 43rd (the only alumni clubhouse who wasn't on 44th Street, whose members, part of the staff, and in-residence club, Williams College Club of New York, were absorbed into Penn Club following a previous visiting reciprocity agreement between the Princeton-Penn Clubs, before Princeton's went out of business during COVID). Despite being in New York City, Columbia University Club of New York (est. 1901) left Princeton after residence agreement issues to become in-residence at The Penn Club, while Dartmouth shares the Yale Club, and Brown shares the Cornell Club.

View of the Yale Club Lounge

The Yale Club shares its facility with the similar Dartmouth and University of Virginia club (Columbia University shares a clubhouse with the Penn Club, while Brown shares the Cornell Club). The neighborhood is also home to the University Club of New York, and the flagship stores of J. Press and Paul Stuart, which traditionally catered to the club set. The building is a New York City-designated landmark.

The 22-story clubhouse contains three dining spaces (the "Tap Room," the "Grill Room," and the Roof Dining Room and Terrace), four bars (in the Tap Room, Grill Room, Main Lounge, and on the Roof Terrace), banquet rooms for up to 500 people (including the 20th-floor Grand Ballroom), 138 guest rooms, a library, a fitness and squash center with three international squash courts and a swimming pool, and a barber shop, among other amenities. The heart of the clubhouse is the main lounge, a large room with a high, ornate ceiling and large columns and walls lined with fireplaces and portraits of the five Yale-educated United States presidents, all of whom are or were members of the Yale Club: William Howard Taft, Gerald R. Ford, George H. W. Bush, Bill Clinton, and George W. Bush. Outside the lounge above the main staircase hangs a posthumous portrait of Elihu Yale by Francis Edwin Elwell and a portrait of Supreme Court Justice Sonia Sotomayor.

== History ==
=== Early history ===
The Yale Club was created in 1897 by the Old Yale Alumni Association of New York, a 29-year-old organization that wanted a permanent clubhouse. One of the incorporators was Senator Chauncey Depew, whose 1890 portrait by the Swiss-born American artist Adolfo Müller-Ury hangs in the building. The first president of the Yale Club was attorney Thomas Thacher, founder of Simpson Thacher & Bartlett. The first clubhouse was a rented brownstone at 17 East 26th Street. In 1901, the club built a 12-story clubhouse at 30 West 44th Street, which today is home to the Penn Club of New York.

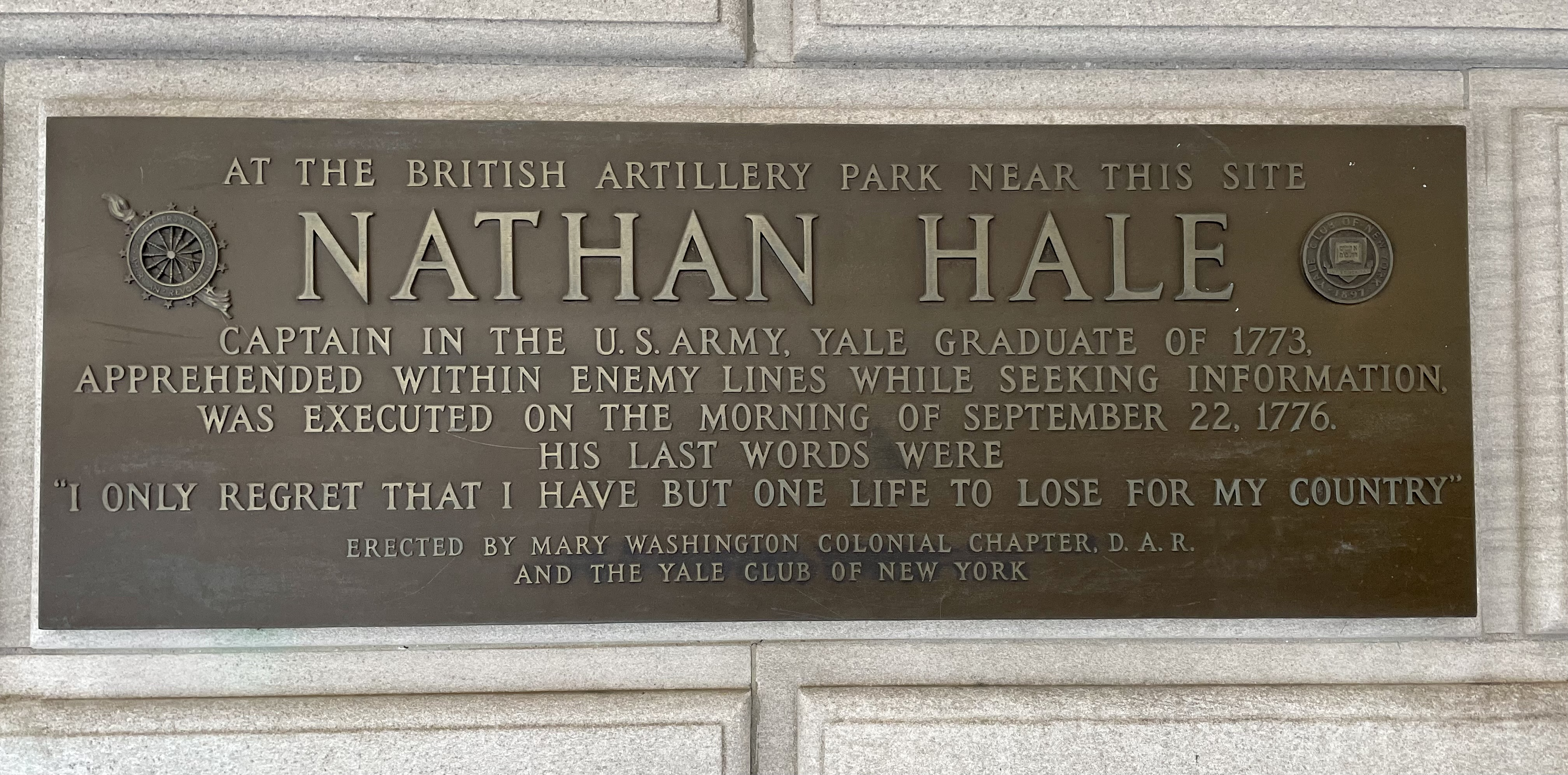
Yale Club plaque of patriot Nathan Hale, a spy during the Revolutionary War

The current clubhouse opened in June 1915. Designed by architect and Yale alumnus James Gamble Rogers in conjunction with the construction of Grand Central Terminal, it was largely paid for by money raised or contributed by President George C. Ide of Brooklyn (whose portrait by George Burroughs Torrey hangs in the building). Its location was chosen because it was believed to be where Yale alumnus Nathan Hale was hanged by the British Army for espionage during the American Revolution, although the site of Hale's execution has more recently been disputed.

The Ken Burns documentary Prohibition said the Yale Club stocked sufficient liquor to see the club through the repeal of Prohibition in 1933.

=== 21st century ===
Heisman Trophy awarded to USC Trojans quarterback Carson Palmer at the Yale Club in 2002.

In July 1999, the Yale Club became the first of New York's Ivy League university clubs to change its dress code to business casual, a move that upset some members and was received with polite scorn from other clubs. Today, the dress code remains business casual, except in the athletic facilities. In the fall of 2012, the club began to allow denim to be worn in the library, the Grill Room, and on the rooftop terrace during the summer, but nowhere else, as long as it is "neat, clean, and in good repair."

Following the September 11 attacks in 2001, the Heisman Trophy, traditionally presented at the Downtown Athletic Club and was presented at the New York Marriott Marquis in 2001, was presented at the Yale Club in 2002 and 2003. The 2002 winner was quarterback Carson Palmer of the USC Trojans, and the 2003 winner was quarterback Jason White of the University of Oklahoma Sooners. Before the two Heisman Trophy ceremonies, the un-awarded trophy itself was displayed in the Yale Club's lobby, flanked by portraits of Yale's two Heisman winners, end Larry Kelley (1936) and halfback Clint Frank (1937).

In June 2007, former U.S. Solicitor General and onetime Supreme Court nominee Robert Bork sued the club in federal court. Bork alleged that, while trying to reach the dais to speak at an event for The New Criterion magazine, he fell because the club negligently failed to provide steps or a handrail between the floor and the dais. Bork claimed that his injuries required surgery, immobilized him for months, forced him to use a cane, and left him with a limp. He sought judgment for $1 million in damages plus punitive damages and attorney's fees. In May 2008, Bork and the club reached a confidential, out-of-court settlement.

== Membership ==
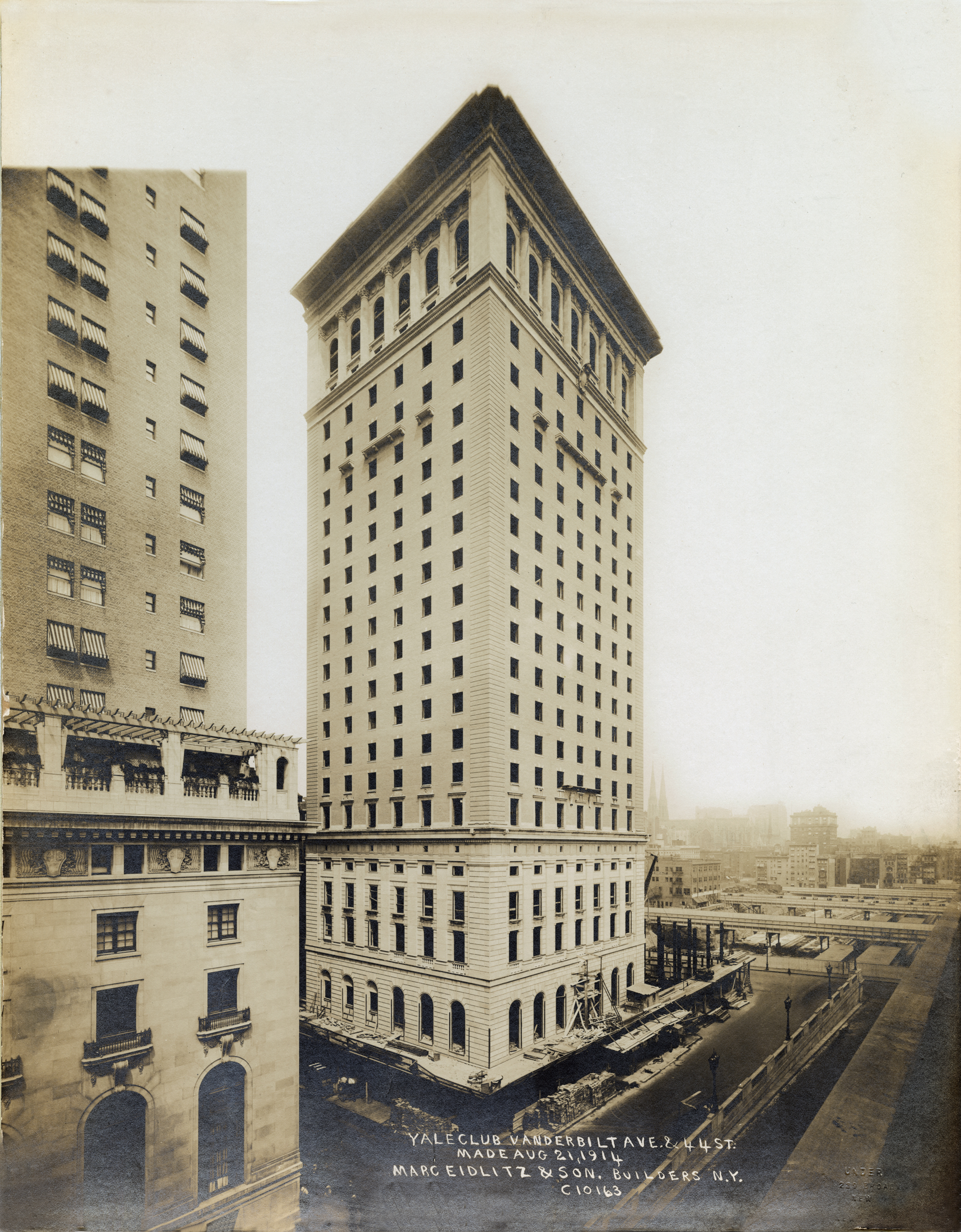
Yale Club in 1914

To be eligible for membership, a candidate must be an alumnus/alumna, faculty member, full-time graduate student of Yale University, or a child of one. The club sends a monthly newsletter to members.

Yale College did not allow women to become members until 1969. Wives of members had to enter the club through a separate entrance (today the service entrance), and were not allowed to have access to much of the clubhouse. Once Yale opened to women, however, the club quickly followed suit on July 30, 1969, although the club did not open its bar, dining room, or athletic facilities to women until 1974 and did not open its swimming pool (known as "the plunge") to women until 1987. Now, women constitute a large percentage of the club's membership.

Three other, smaller clubs also are in residence at the Yale Club: the Dartmouth, the Virginia, and the Delta Kappa Epsilon Clubs. Members of these other clubs have the same access to the clubhouse and its facilities as members of the Yale Club itself.

According to a book published for the club's 1997 centennial, members at that time included George H. W. Bush, Hillary Clinton, Bill Clinton, Gerald Ford, John Kerry and George Pataki. Among others were architect Cesar Pelli and author David McCullough. Today, the Yale Club has more than 11,000 members worldwide.

In 1972, Frank Mankiewicz famously described John Lindsay as "the only populist in history who plays squash at the Yale Club."

== See also ==
- Columbia University Club of New York
- Cornell Club of New York
- Harvard Club of Boston
- Harvard Club of New York City
- Penn Club of New York City
- Princeton Club of New York
- List of New York City Designated Landmarks in Manhattan from 14th to 59th Streets
