= Harvard Club of New York City =

Social club in New York City

- U.S. National Register of Historic Places
- New York State Register of Historic Places
- New York City Landmark
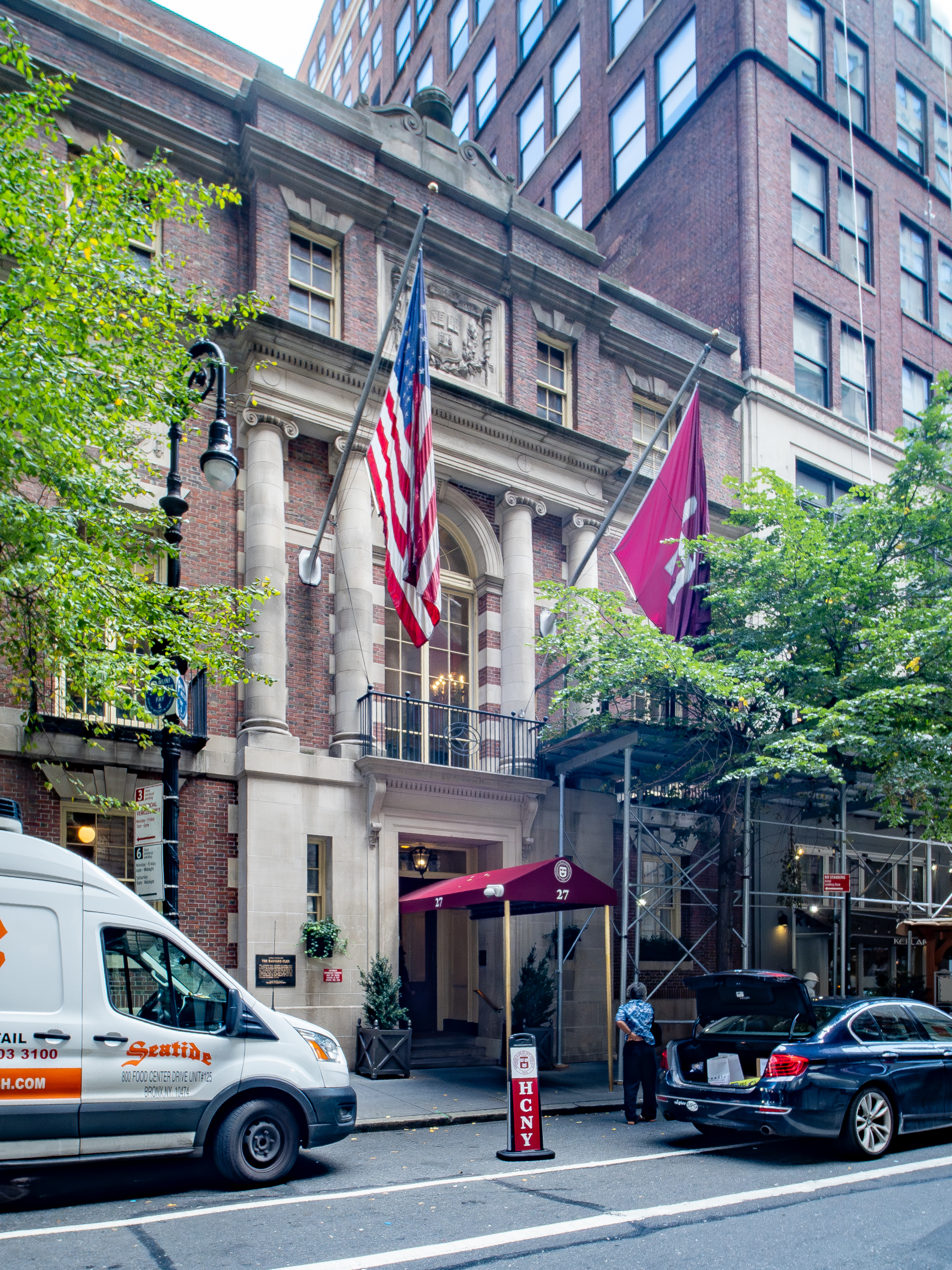
- (2025)
- Location: 27 West 44th Street, Manhattan, New York
- Coordinates: 40°45′20″N 73°58′53″W
- Built: 1894; 132 years ago; enlarged in 1905, 1915 and 1989
- Architect: Charles Follen McKim of McKim, Mead & White
- Architectural style: Colonial Revival, neo-Georgian style
- NRHP reference No.: 80002693
- NYSRHP No.: 06101.000057
- NYCL No.: 0259

Significant dates
- Added to NRHP: March 28, 1980
- Designated NYSRHP: June 23, 1980
- Designated NYCL: January 11, 1967

The Harvard Club of New York City, commonly called The Harvard Club, is a private social club located in Midtown Manhattan, New York City. Its membership is limited to alumni, faculty and board members of Harvard University. The club's IRS filing lists the following mission: “The Harvard Club of New York city ("the club") promotes social interaction among members who have been with Harvard University as students or instructors, or who have received honorary degrees. The members can access the club's 70 overnight guest rooms, fitness center, dining facilities, banquet facilities, and library.”

Incorporated in 1887, the club is located on adjoining lots at 27 and 35 West 44th Street. The original wing, built in 1894, was designed in red brick neo-Georgian style by architect Charles Follen McKim of McKim, Mead & White.

The Harvard Club of New York City has EIN 13-0827620 under 501(c)(7) Social and Recreation Clubs; in 2024 it claimed total revenue of $43,725,943 and total assets of $53,990,140. The Harvard Club of New York Foundation has EIN 13-6117421 as a 501(c)(3) Public Charity; in 2024 it had total revenue of $924,622 and claimed total assets of $8,779,641. The separate Harvard Club of NY Historical Foundation has EIN 27-1328897 as a 501(c)(3) Private Nonoperating Foundation; in 2024 it claimed total revenue of $411,994 and total assets of $579,648.

== History ==
Founded without a location in 1865 by a group of Harvard University alumni, the club rented a townhouse in 1887 on 22nd Street for use as a clubhouse. In 1888, the club acquired land on 44th Street intending to build a new clubhouse there.

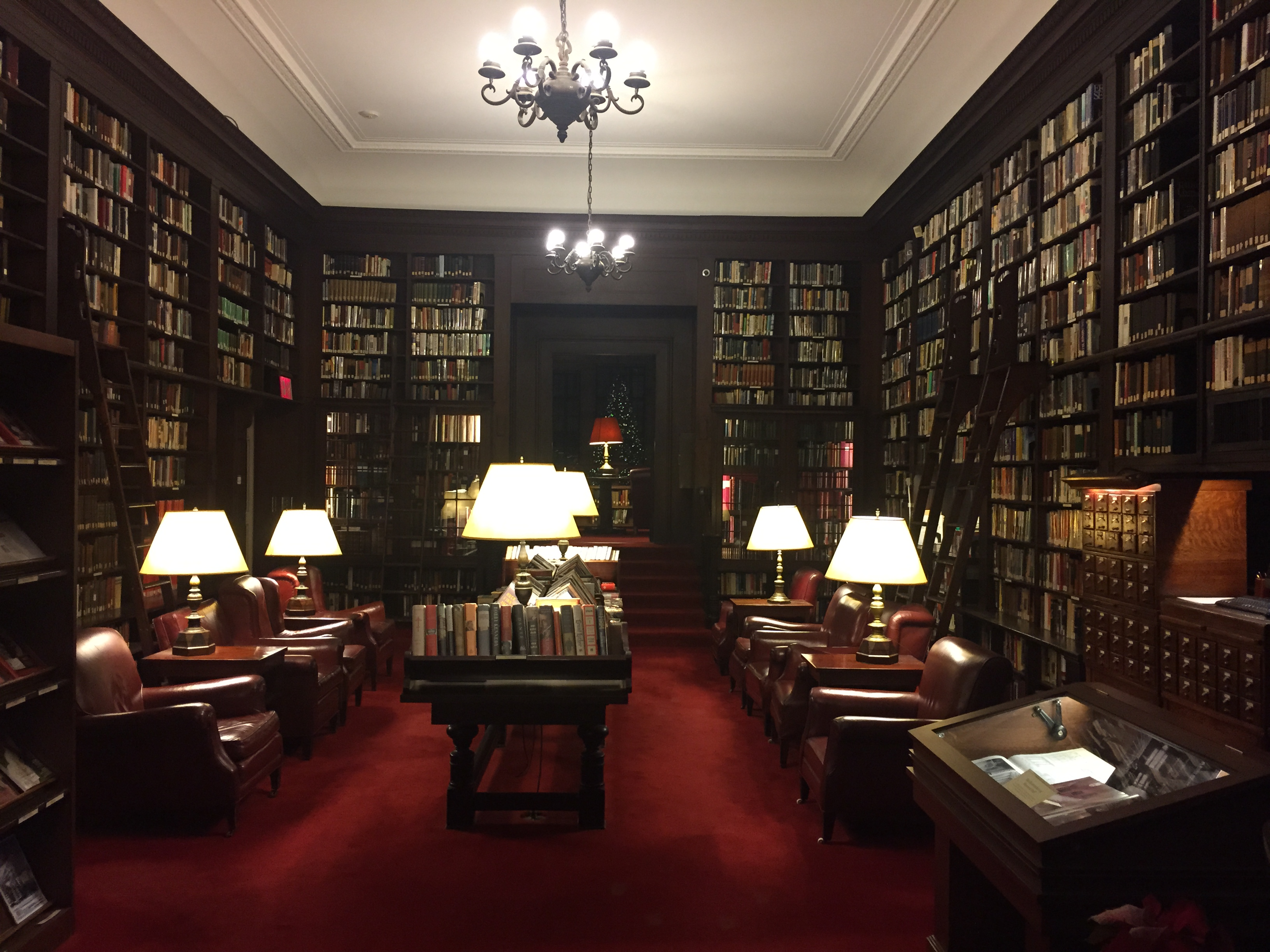
The Harvard Club library

After the Penn Club of New York (est. 1901) became the first alumni clubhouse to join Clubhouse Row for inter-club events at 30 West 44th Street after Harvard Club of New York City (est. 1888) at 27 West 44th, then New York Yacht Club (est. 1899) at 37 West 44th, and Yale Club of New York City (est. 1915) on East 44th (and Vanderbilt) and Cornell Club of New York (est. 1989) at 6 East 44th on the same block, with Princeton Club of New York joining in 1963 at 15 West 43rd (the only alumni clubhouse that was not on 44th Street, whose members, part of the staff, and in-residence club, Williams College Club of New York, were absorbed into Penn Club following a previous visiting reciprocity agreement between the Princeton-Penn Clubs, before Princeton's went out of business during COVID). Despite being in New York City, Columbia University Club of New York (est. 1901) left Princeton after residence agreement issues to become in-residence at The Penn Club, while Dartmouth shares the Yale Club, and Brown shares the Cornell Club.

The Harvard Club selected architect Charles Follen McKim, of McKim, Mead & White, for the project. The design was Georgian style architecture with Harvard brick and Indiana limestone. The building's 1894 façade is reminiscent of McKim, Mead and White's 1901 gates at Harvard Yard. In 1905, Harvard Hall, the Grill Room, a new library, a billiard room, and two floors of guest rooms were added.

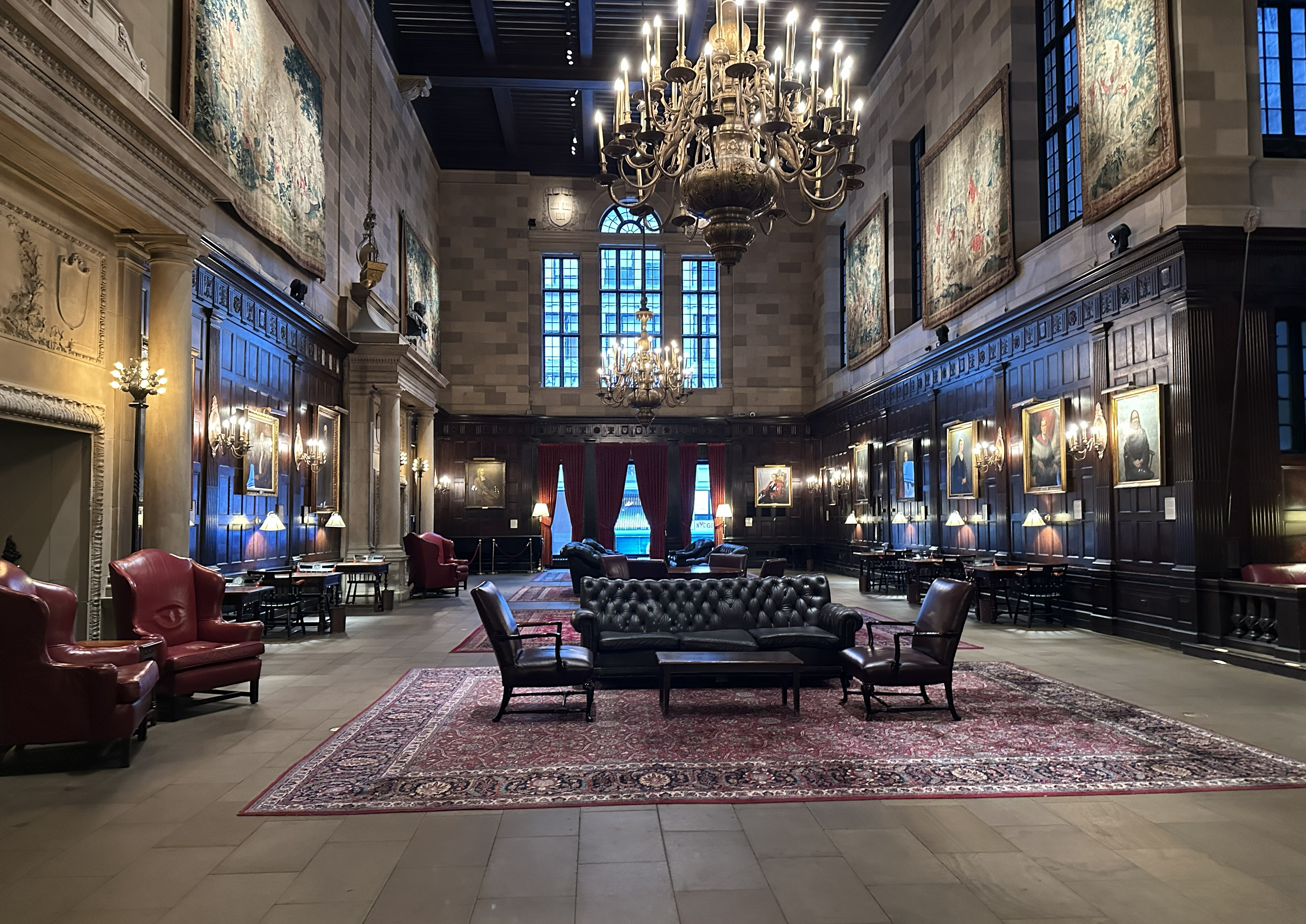
Harvard Hall, Harvard Club of New York (HCNY), 2026

In 1915, McKim, Mead & White doubled the building's size by constructing the Main Dining Room, a bar, additional guestrooms, banquet rooms, and athletic facilities including a 7th floor swimming pool.

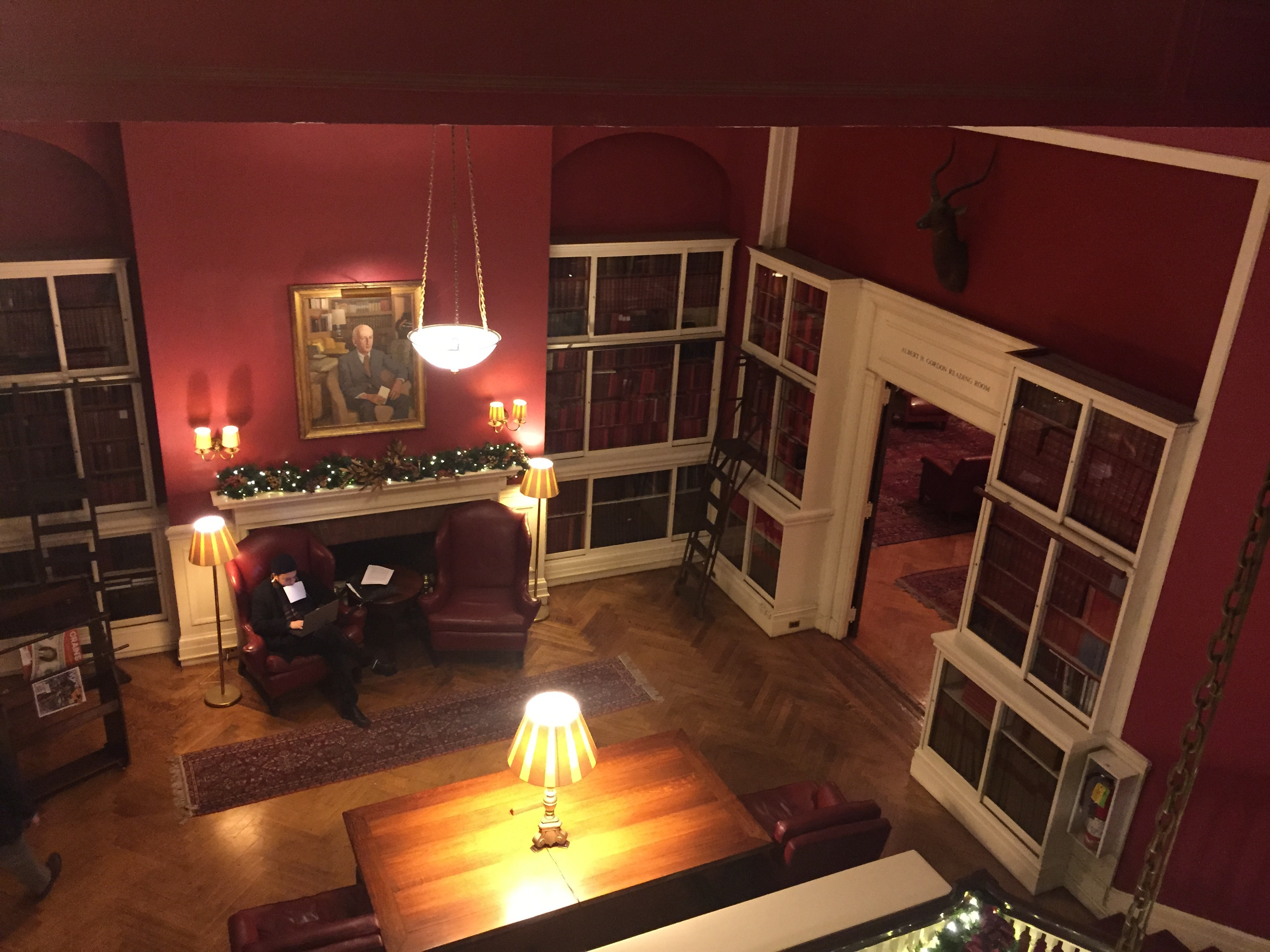
The library reading area

In 2003, the architects Davis Brody Bond, under the direction of J. Max Bond Jr., added a 40,000-square-foot annex on West 44th Street, with a façade clad in limestone and fenestrated with large glass windows.

== Admission of women ==
In the spring of 1970, four Harvard Business School students, Ellen Marram, Katie Metzger, Roslyn Braeman Payne, and Lynn Salvage, were turned away from membership interviews at the Harvard Club of New York because it was at the time a male only club. That fall, Marram and Salvage wrote to Morgan Wheelock, the president of the Harvard Club of New York, to request that women be granted equal membership privileges. Wheelock rejected the request. In January 1971, Marram and Salvage began a letter-writing campaign to the new president, Albert H. Gordon. A group of Harvard alumni seeking club membership met with Gordon in the fall of 1971, but Gordon initially denied the delegation's request to bring women's membership to a vote.

A Harvard Law School alumnus, Marguerite "Mitzi" Filson, suggested the group take legal action against the Harvard Club of New York. Marram, Salvage, Metzler, Payne, and Filson, represented pro bono by Jed S. Rakoff, then prepared a gender discrimination claim to file with the New York Commission on Human Rights. In response, Gordon agreed to put the matter to a vote. Shortly before the vote, several Harvard alumni, including attorney and activist Brenda Feigen, co-founder of the ACLU Women's Rights Project, sued the Harvard Club in federal court, seeking revocation of the club's liquor license on sex discrimination grounds.

On May 4, 1972, the club voted to deny full membership rights to women. A majority of members (1,654 to 854) supported membership for women, but the vote fell 18 votes short of the required two-thirds needed to amend its membership criteria. Marram, Salvage, Metzler, Payne, and Filson then filed their complaint with the New York Commission on Human Rights. Commission chairwoman Eleanor Holmes Norton issued a two-page letter condemning the Harvard Club's exclusion of women. After the parties came before a New York Human Rights administrative judge, the Harvard Club's board of managers called another vote. On January 11, 1973, the club voted 2,097 to 695 to admit female members.

== Membership ==
To be eligible for election to membership, a candidate must hold a degree or honorary degree from Harvard, be a tenured faculty member at the university, or serve as an officer, or member of any board or committee of the university. Dues levied are on a sliding scale, based on age and proximity to the club. Like most private clubs, members of the Harvard Club are given reciprocal benefits at clubs around the United States and the world.

The building is sometimes used for outside corporate events such as business conferences.

== Notable members ==
- Jeannette Osborn Baylies, 31st President General of the Daughters of the American Revolution
- Michael Bloomberg, Mayor of New York City and businessman
- Richard Edelman, businessman
- Felix Frankfurter, associate justice of the U.S. Supreme Court .
- Merrick Garland, 86th United States Attorney General
- John F. Kennedy, 35th president of the United States
- Reginald Lewis, first African American to build a billion-dollar company
- John Jay McKelvey Sr., founder of Harvard Law Review
- Victor Niederhoffer, played squash for the Harvard Club, 5x US singles champion and 3x US doubles champion; hedge fund manager.
- Franklin D. Roosevelt, 32nd president of the United States
- Theodore Roosevelt, 26th President of the United States
- James Toback, screenwriter and film director
- Frederick M. Warburg, banker

== Philanthropy ==
The Harvard Club of New York Foundation makes an annual gift to the Harvard College Financial Aid Program, maintains a scholarship fund that helps support 20 undergraduates at Harvard College, supports several Harvard University graduate programs and provides stipends to support Harvard University students to work non-paying, or low paying fields.

== Gallery ==
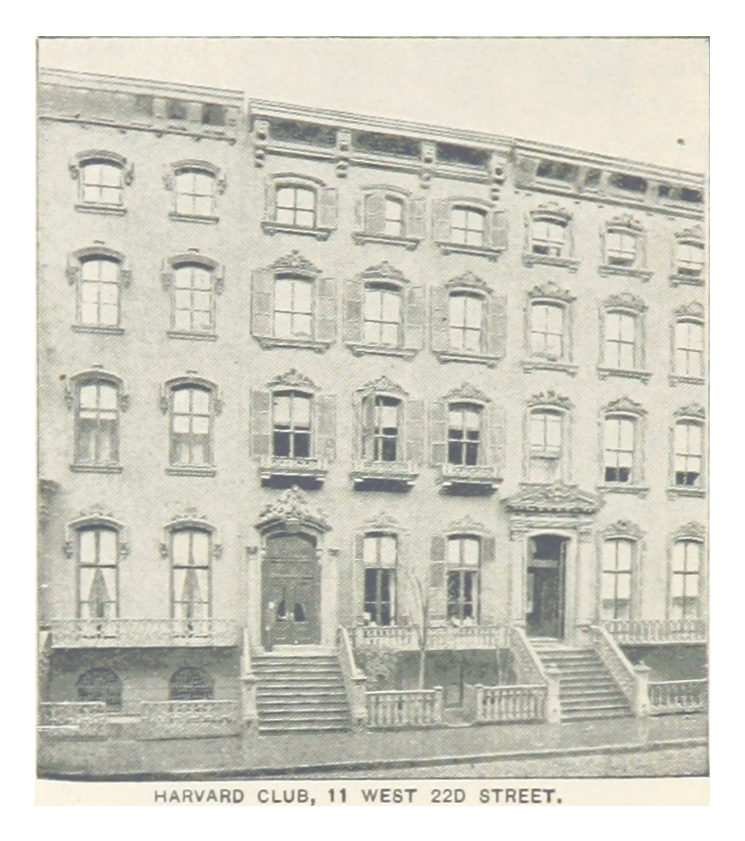
The first Harvard Club of New York, a leased brownstone at 11 West 22nd Street

The Harvard Club of New York in 1894

The Harvard Club Library in 1894

The Harvard Club staircase in 1894

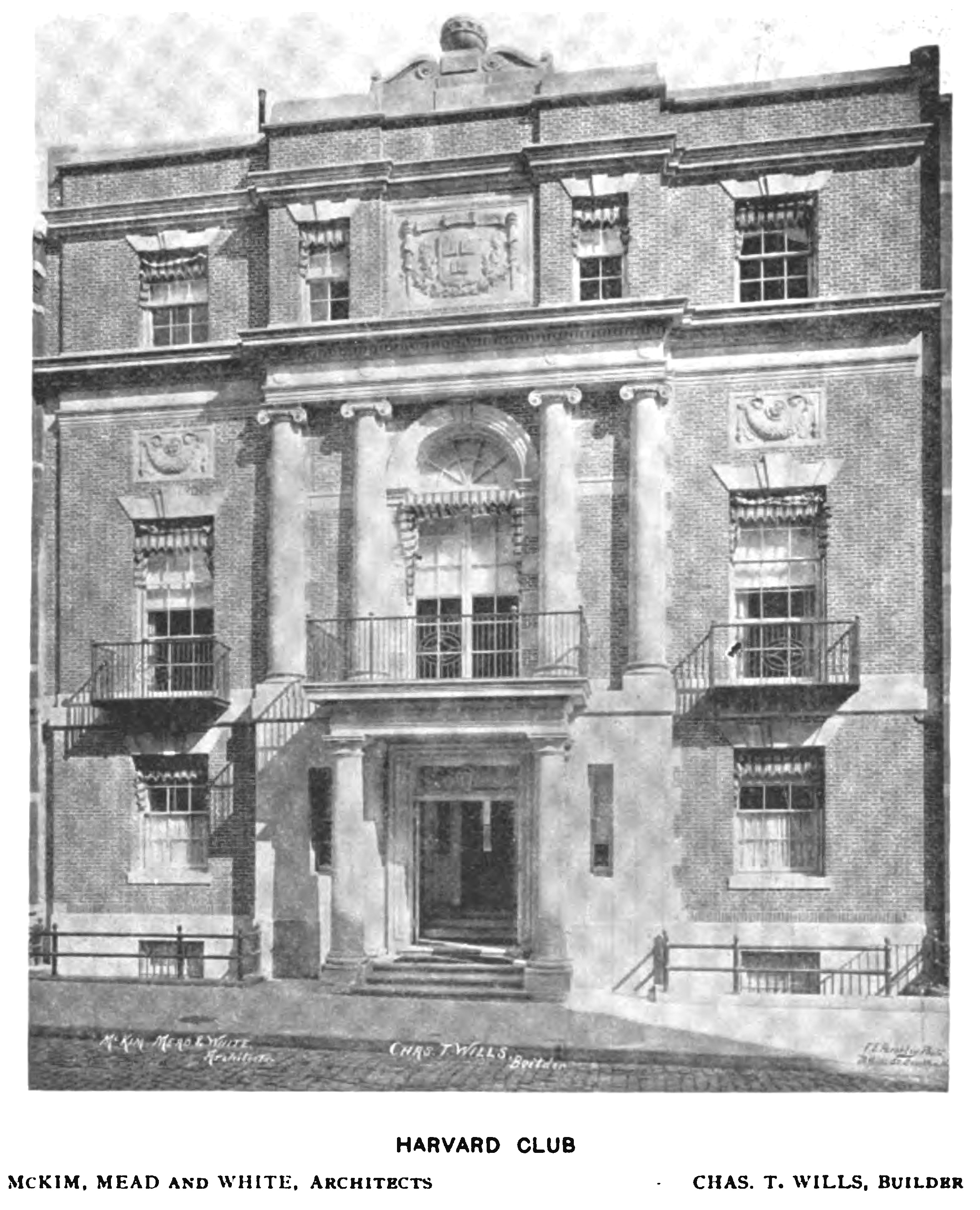
The 1894 Harvard clubhouse, designed by Charles F. McKim, in 1896

The Harvard Club's staircase in 1906

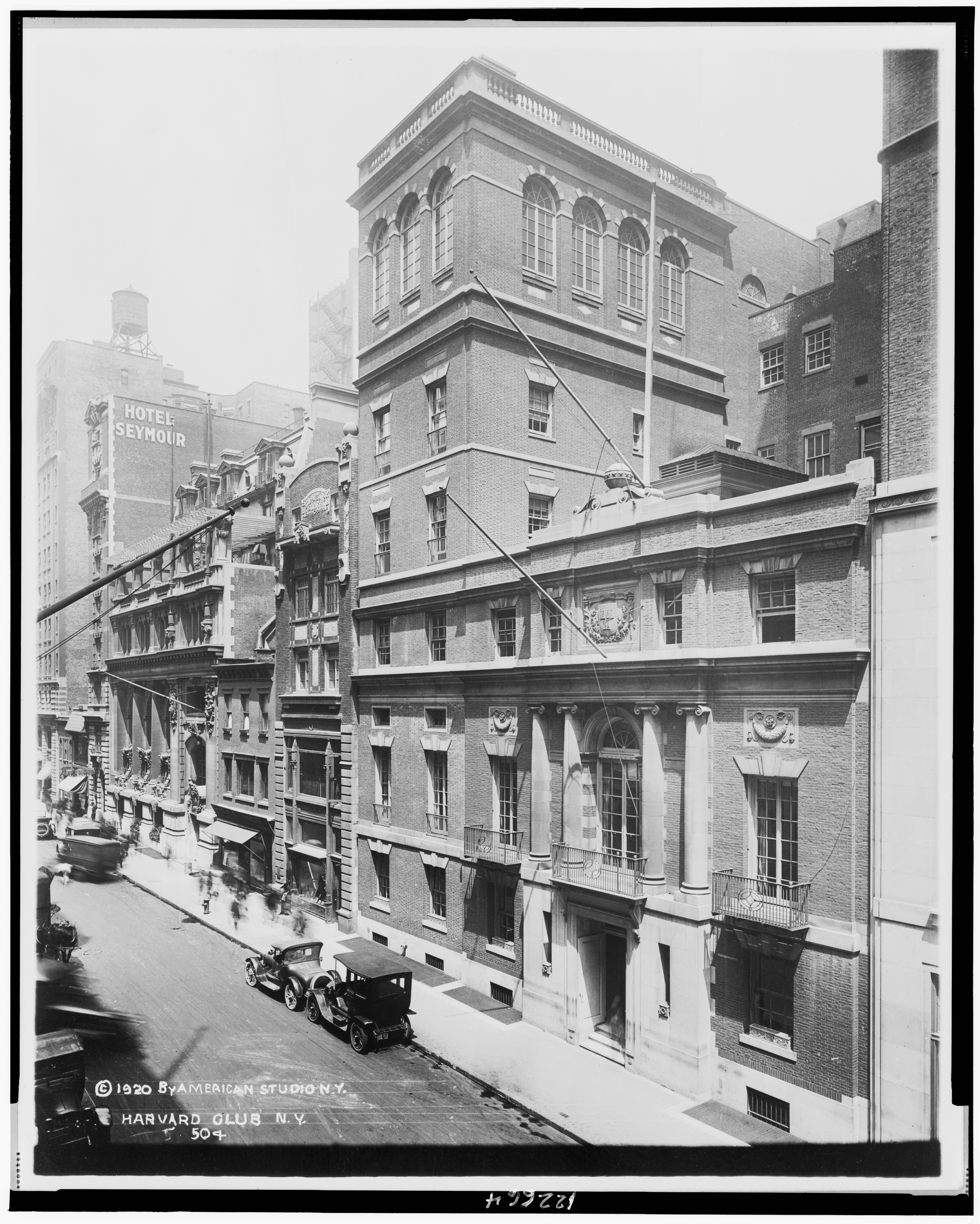
A 1920 view of the Harvard Club, with McKim, Mead & White's 1894 clubhouse (on right) and their 1915 addition to Harvard Club (on left)

== See also ==
- Harvard Club of Boston
- Harvard Club of Washington DC
