= Harvard Club of Washington DC =

Harvard Club of Washington, DC
- Formation: 1883
- Type: Private club
- Headquarters: Washington, D.C., U.S.
- Affiliations: Harvard University
- Budget: $199,914 (estimate)
- Staff: 1
- Website: http://www.harvard-dc.org

The Harvard Club of Washington DC is a private social club operating in Washington, D.C. Its membership is essentially restricted to alumni and associates of Harvard University.

== History and Operations ==
The Harvard Club of Washington, D.C. is the third-most popular social club in Georgetown. It does not own a physical clubhouse.

== Membership ==
Membership is restricted to recipients of degrees from Harvard University, current students who have participated in an academic program at Harvard University of at least six-week duration, parents of current students, spouses of deceased members, and those who have completed at least one academic year at Harvard University as a professor, instructor, or officer. Current students, recent graduates, and senior graduates enjoy free or discounted memberships. Members of the Club are given reciprocal benefits at 130 Harvard Clubs in the United States and around the world.

== See also ==
- Harvard Club of Boston
- Harvard Club of New York City
