= 30 West 44th Street =

Building in Manhattan, New York

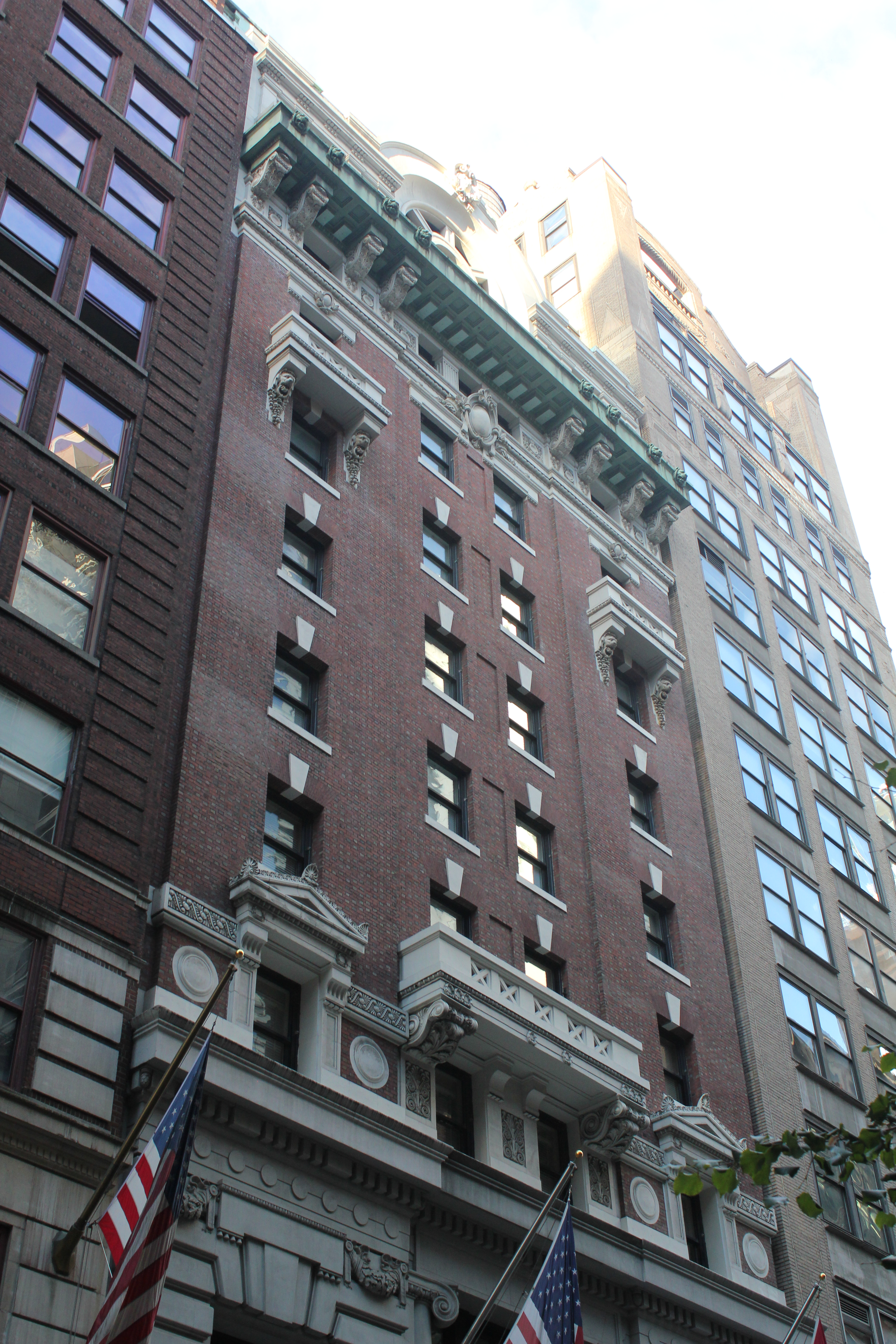
- Interactive map of the 30 West 44th Street area
- Former names: Yale Club of New York City Building, United States Maritime Building, Army Reserves Building
- Alternative names: Penn Club of New York Building

General information
- Type: Clubhouse
- Architectural style: Beaux-Arts
- Location: Manhattan, New York City, United States
- Coordinates: 40°45′19″N 73°58′54″W
- Current tenants: Penn Club of New York
- Construction started: October 1900
- Completed: May 1, 1901
- Renovated: 1992–1994
- Cost: $250,000 (equivalent to $9,675,000 in 2025)
- Owner: University of Pennsylvania trustees
- Affiliation: University of Pennsylvania

Technical details
- Floor count: 14
- Grounds: 5,038 ft^{2} (468.0 m^{2})

Design and construction
- Architects: Evarts Tracy and Egerton Swartwout
- Architecture firm: Tracy and Swartwout
- Developer: The Yale Club of New York City
- Main contractor: Marc Eidlitz & Son

Renovating team
- Architect: David P. Helpern

Website
- Official website

New York City Landmark
- Designated: February 9, 2010
- Reference no.: 2379

30 West 44th Street (formerly the Yale Club of New York City Building, United States Maritime Building, and Army Reserves Building; also the Penn Club of New York Building) is the clubhouse of the Penn Club of New York in the Midtown Manhattan neighborhood of New York City. Designed by architecture firm Tracy and Swartwout in the Beaux-Arts style, the building opened in 1901 as the Yale Club of New York City's clubhouse. The building is part of Clubhouse Row, a concentration of clubhouses on 44th Street between Fifth and Sixth Avenues, and is a New York City designated landmark.

The structure was originally 11 stories tall, but it was expanded to 14 stories in the early 1990s. The ornately decorated facade on 44th Street is made of brick, Indiana limestone, and terracotta; the first two stories are clad with rusticated limestone blocks, while the upper stories are largely clad with brick and terracotta. The mansard roof on the 11th story is topped by a three-story brick-and-limestone penthouse. When the building served as the Yale Club's clubhouse, it had club rooms on the lower floors, bedrooms in the intermediate stories, and dining rooms on the highest stories. The interiors have been modified significantly over the years. The modern clubhouse contains club rooms, bedrooms, and dining rooms for the Penn Club.

The Yale Club was founded in 1897 and, following rapid increases in its membership, acquired the 44th Street site in early 1900. The Yale Club Building officially opened on May 1, 1901, but it became overcrowded within a decade, prompting the club to relocate to 50 Vanderbilt Avenue in 1915. The building was next occupied by Delta Kappa Epsilon from 1917 to 1925 and by Army & Navy Club of America from 1925 to 1933. After standing vacant for a decade, the building was acquired by the federal government of the United States in 1943. The building contained offices for the United States Maritime Service during World War II, and it housed the Organized Reserve after 1948. The federal government sold 30 West 44th Street in 1971 to Touro College, which sold the building to the University of Pennsylvania in 1989. Penn hired David P. Helpern to renovate the building and add three stories for the Penn Club, and the building reopened in June 1994. The Columbia University Club of New York also uses the clubhouse under a reciprocity agreement with the Penn Club.

== Site ==
30 West 44th Street, originally the Yale Club of New York City Building, is on the south sidewalk of 44th Street, between Sixth Avenue and Fifth Avenue, in the Midtown Manhattan neighborhood of New York City. The rectangular land lot covers 5,038 ft^{2} (468.0 m^{2}), with a frontage of 50 ft (15 m) on 44th Street and a depth of 100.42 ft (31 m). On the same block, the New York City Bar Association Building and the Royalton Hotel are to the west, while the General Society of Mechanics and Tradesmen Building, the Century Association Building, and the Hotel Mansfield are to the east. Other nearby buildings include the Algonquin, Iroquois, and Sofitel New York hotels to the northwest; the New York Yacht Club Building and the Harvard Club of New York City building to the north; and the Aeolian Building, Salmon Tower Building, 500 Fifth Avenue, and 510 Fifth Avenue on the block immediately to the south.

The current building replaced smaller structures at 30 and 32 West 44th Street. The adjacent block of 44th Street is known as Club Row, which contains several clubhouses. When 30 West 44th Street was developed at the beginning of the 20th century, several other clubhouses were being built in the area. By the early 1900s, these other clubs included the New York Yacht Club, Harvard Club, New York City Bar Association, Century Association, and the City Club of New York, all of which remained in the area at the end of the 20th century. Prior to the development of 30 West 44th Street, the neighborhood contained a slaughterhouse, stables for stagecoach horses, and a train yard for the elevated Sixth Avenue Line. There were historically many stagecoach stables on 43rd and 44th Streets between Fifth and Sixth Avenues, but only a few of the stables remained by the end of the 20th century.

== Architecture ==
Tracy and Swartwout designed 30 West 44th Street, which was completed in 1901, in the Beaux-Arts style. The structure was originally 11 stories tall, but it was expanded to 14 stories in the early 1990s. The design of the upper stories and interior dates to the 1990s renovation, which was designed by David W. Helpern. 30 West 44th Street was the first university clubhouse in New York City to be designed as a high-rise structure. The building was predated by numerous multi-story clubhouses, such as the University Club of New York, but these clubhouses were generally designed to resemble low-rise buildings, downplaying their height.

=== Facade ===
The building's facade largely resembles its original design and is primarily made of brick and Indiana limestone. In addition, New York Architectural Terra Cotta manufactured architectural terracotta for the building's facade. The 44th Street elevation of the facade is ornately decorated. It is divided horizontally into a two-story base, six-story midsection, three-story upper section, and a setback three-story penthouse. The base is divided vertically into three bays, while the upper stories are split into four bays. The rear elevation of the facade is clad in plain red brick with window openings and ventilation grilles. Two water towers and rooftop mechanical equipment are visible from 43rd Street, behind the building.

==== Base ====
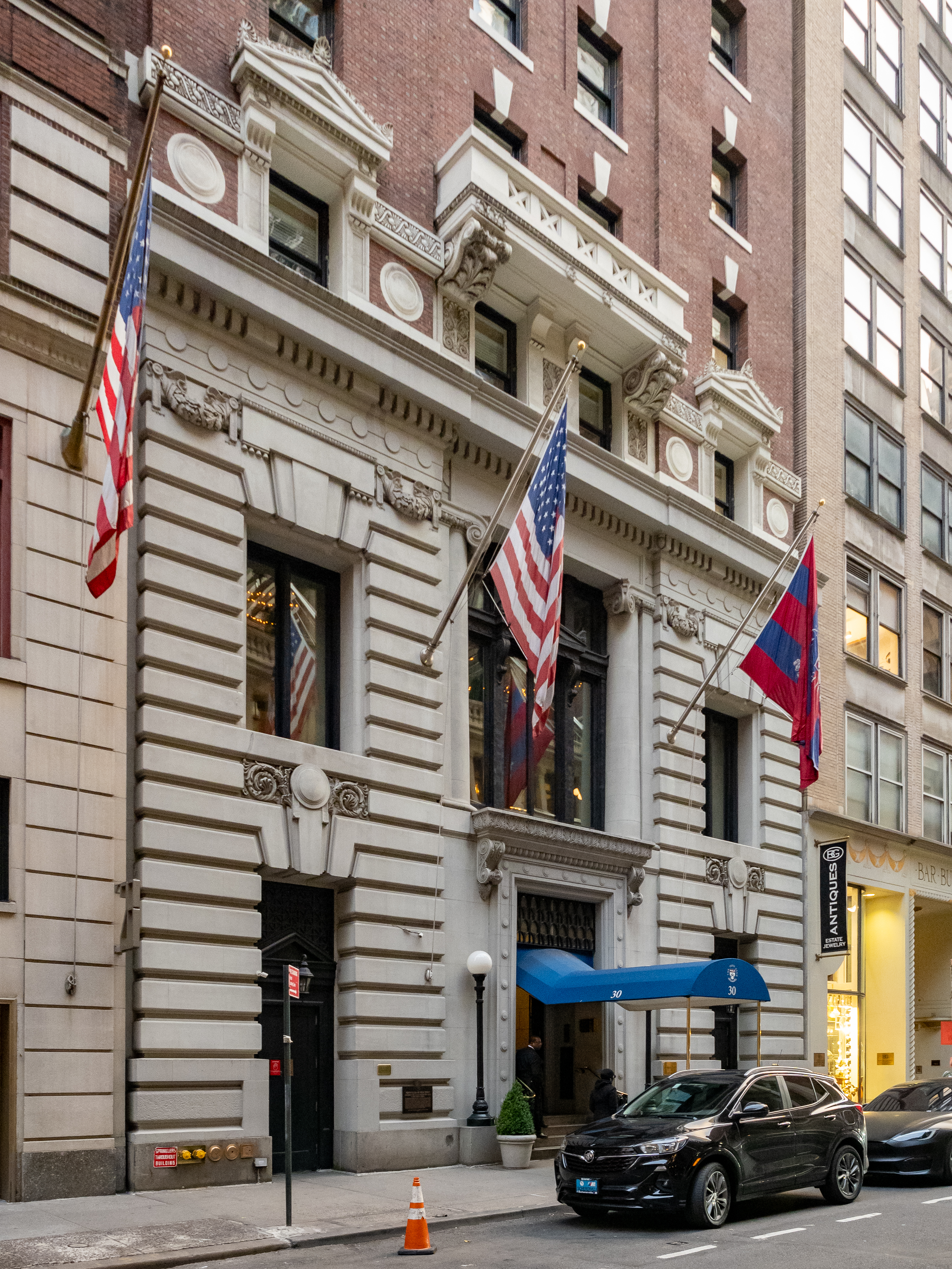
The first two stories of the facade

The lowest portion of the facade contains a water table of granite, above which the first two stories are clad with rusticated limestone blocks. The main entrance is at the center of the facade and is accessed by a short granite stoop with granite walls on either side. The doorway contains a set of metal-and-glass double doors, topped by a metal grille, and is surrounded by bosses. Above the main entrance is an entablature with brackets; originally, the center of the entablature contained a cartouche with Yale University's shield. To the right of the main entrance was a window that illuminated the basement, while to the left was a doorway to the basement; both were topped by sash windows at the first story. In the early 1990s, metal doors were installed at ground level in both bays, with pediments, lighting fixtures, and metal screens above the doors. Above the doorways are voussoirs; the center voussoir contains a round disk with foliate motifs on either side.

On the second story, the center bay contains multiple panes of windows within a metal frame, as well as a pediment with brackets inside the window opening. The bay is flanked by Ionic-style pilasters and half columns, In addition, during the early-1990s renovation, flagpoles were installed next to these pilasters and half-columns. The two outer bays on the second story contain sash windows; above these are voussoirs that contain plaques at the center and swags on either side. The years MDCCCXCVII (1897) and MDCCCCI (1901) were originally inscribed on each plaque, signifying the years of the Yale Club's founding and the building's completion, but the inscriptions have since been removed. Above the voussoirs in the outer bays are bands with bosses. A cornice, with moldings and denticulation, runs horizontally above the second story.

==== Upper stories ====
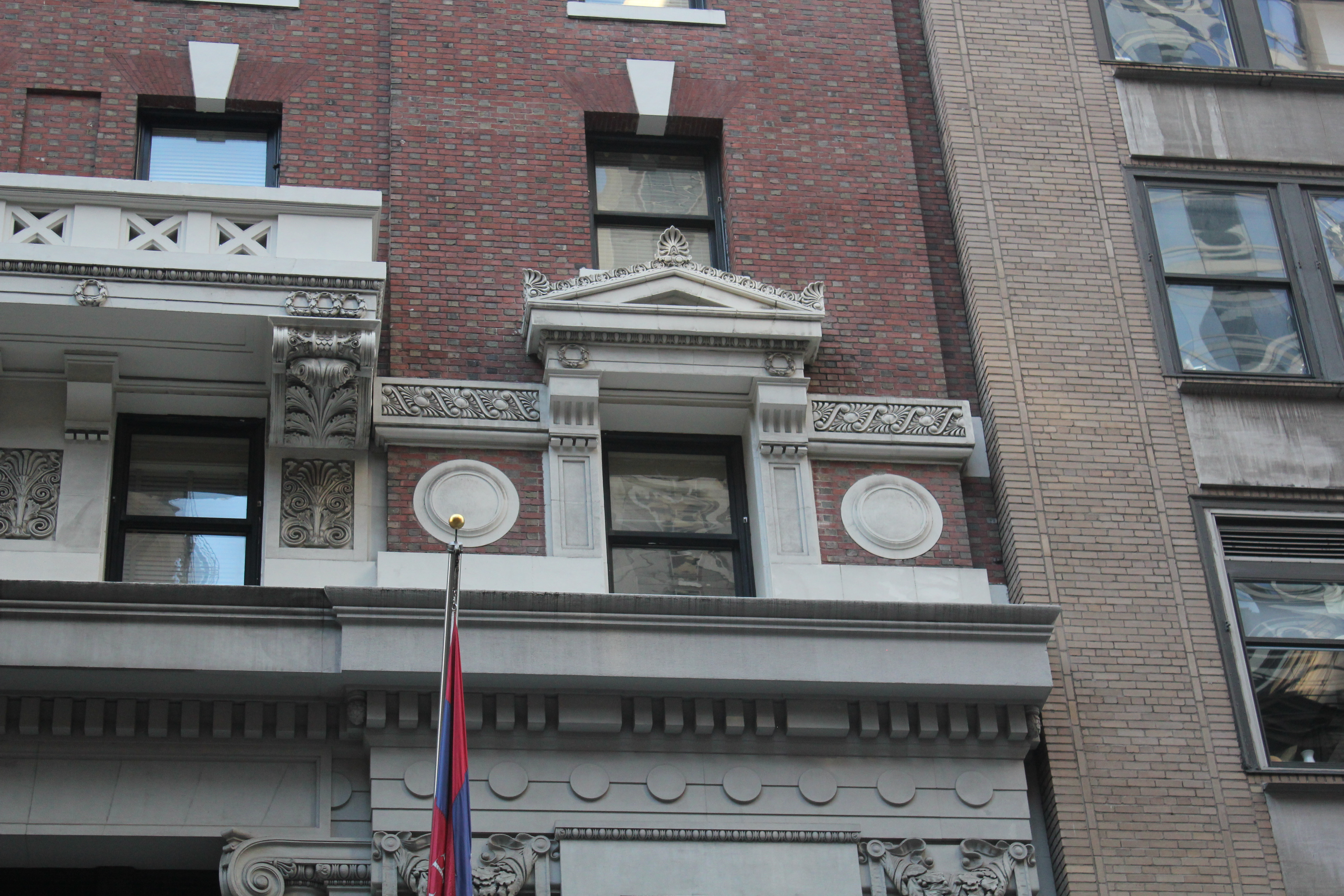
Detail of the outermost windows on the third story as seen in 2021

On the third to eighth stories, the facade is made of red brick with Flemish bond, and there are terracotta decorations. On the third story, the two center bays contain decorative panels on either side, and there is a balcony with ornate brackets directly above these windows. The outer bays on that story contain windows, flanked by pilasters and topped by pediments with corbels and anthemia. There are round disks on either side of the outermost windows on the third story, as well as decorative horizontal bands above these disks. On the fourth through seventh stories, the lintels above each window are composed of brick voussoirs that flank a terracotta keystone. At the seventh story, the windows in the outer bays are flanked by brackets shaped like lions' heads; these brackets support small balconies in the eighth story's outer bays. The lintels above the eighth-story windows are made of terracotta, and there are cartouches with foliate decorations at the center of each eighth-story window. A molded cornice, made of terracotta, runs above the eighth story.

There are small window openings at the ninth story, alternating with terracotta panels that contain disks and foliate decorations; the center of the ninth story contains a pair of fluted pilasters. Above the ninth story is a large copper cornice with coffers, modillions, and large brackets with foliate decorations. There is a balcony above this cornice, placed behind a balustrade that contains panels and balusters. On the tenth story, the center bay contains a molded oversized arch, which includes a tripartite window. This arch formerly contained an inscription of the motto of Connecticut, the state where Yale's campus is located. The two outer bays on that story are flanked by brick and terracotta pilasters, above which is a cornice. The eleventh story is placed within a copper mansard roof and contains projecting dormer windows.

Above the eleventh story is a balustrade; the center of this balustrade curves outward and contains the University of Pennsylvania's seal. The top three stories are set back from the mansard roof and are contain a facade of brick and limestone.

=== Features ===
==== Yale Club ====
Originally, the lowest two floors were used as offices, the middle six floors contained bedrooms, and the highest three floors were used as dining rooms. The Yale Club building was one of several "tower clubhouses" in New York City, where bedrooms were placed beneath club rooms on the lower floors and dining rooms on the upper stories. According to architect Robert A. M. Stern, this particular arrangement was generally used by social clubs that were less prestigious than the Union Club of the City of New York or the Metropolitan Club. The interior also originally contained decorations relating Yale University itself and to Connecticut.

The ground level contained an entrance hall, as well as two reception rooms, an office, billiards room, and a grill room. One of the reception rooms was a wood-paneled smoking room to the left (east) of the entrance hall; the wood paneling contained various inscriptions from old German texts. To the right (west) of the entrance hall was a tiny reception room. The colonial-style grill room measured 40 by 47 ft (12 by 14 m) and contained wooden walls, white floor tiles, and a large fireplace donated by the class of 1867. A set of columns separated the grill room from a similarly styled billiards room. The second floor contained a lounging room, library, and reading room, which could be combined into a single space for receptions and club meetings. It contained green furniture, as well as wooden columns and pilasters with gold capitals. A marble spiral staircase led from the second floor to the rest of the building.

The third to eighth stories contained bedrooms; members could use these bedrooms as short-term hotel rooms or pay annual rent to live there. There were ten bedrooms on each story, four of which had baths. The front section of the ninth floor contained a dining room occupying the facade's entire width, while the rear of that story contained two smaller dining rooms for private events. The largest dining room was intended for class parties and could fit over 100 people; it was decorated in the Yale colors of white and blue, and it contained portraits of Yale athletes. The next-largest dining room was used as a council room, while the smallest dining room contained a bar, which was hidden behind a sliding door. On the tenth floor was the main dining room, which could fit 400 people. The kitchen, storage rooms, and roof gardens were on the eleventh floor. Below the adjacent sidewalk was a mechanical room with three boilers and two water tanks.

==== Penn Club ====
The Penn Club's modern clubhouse contains a living room, a library, and a pair of dining rooms with double-story ceilings. The clubhouse was redecorated in red and blue. Penn alumni Bennett Weinstock and Judie Weinstock imported numerous pieces of furniture for the clubhouse, such as brass chandeliers, walnut tables, carpets, and vases.

The clubhouse includes two restaurants and bars. The main dining room is on the second story and is known as the Presidents and Provosts' Room; it contains a dining foyer with a balcony for musicians, as well as a reception area. This space contains oak floors, gilded fixtures, lighting sconces, and chandeliers similar to those in the original Yale Club. It can also be rented for events on weekends. The Grill Room is accessed by a spiral marble staircase beneath the foyer; it contains a mahogany bar, a recreation of the Old King Cole mural, and other furnishings. The Benjamin Franklin Living Room is next to the foyer. It contains oak-paneled walls, a fireplace, piano, paintings of Penn leaders, and a library for members. Members are required to wear jackets and ties in the library.

The clubhouse contains 39 guestrooms, which are rented to members and their guests for short periods. The guestrooms are on the fifth through ninth floors. Each of the guestroom floors is themed to different alumni's and students' accomplishments. On the 13th floor are a fitness center and an outdoor terrace.

== History ==
30 West 44th Street was constructed as the headquarters of the Yale Club of New York City. That club was established in 1897 to replace the Yale Alumni Association of New York, which had been established in 1868. The Yale Club was initially headquartered at 17 East 26th Street, the former clubhouse of the Lambs Club. Within three years of the Yale Club's founding, the club had 1,100 members. To accommodate the growing membership, the Yale Club unsuccessfully attempted to acquire an existing building in midtown Manhattan, ultimately deciding to develop a new structure.

=== Yale Club ===
In February 1900, the club acquired an option for the purchase of two lots at 30 and 32 West 44th Street. The Yale Club had hired Evarts Tracy and Egerton Swartwout to design an 11-story clubhouse on the 50 by 100 ft (15 by 30 m) site. Both architects were Yale Club members who had formerly worked for the architectural firm of McKim, Mead & White. The building's facade was to be made of red brick and white stone, while the interior would contain various club rooms, restrooms, and bedrooms. Income from the bedrooms would provide income for the clubhouse until the club decided to expand; if the club was unsuccessful, the building could be converted into an apartment structure. At a meeting the same month, the club's board voted to raise $175,000 and then purchase the lots. The Yale Club had raised $56,000 at the time. The entire building was expected to cost $200,000.

The Yale Building Company was formed to oversee the clubhouse's development, obtaining a mortgage loan to fund the project. The option on the land was initially supposed to expire at the end of February 1900, but this deadline was later extended by a month to allow the club to raise money for the acquisition. William P. Eno, acting on behalf of the Yale Club, bought the two lots in March 1900. The Yale Club formally took title to the site two months later, paying $110,000; it bought one lot from Isidore and Bertha Jackson and the other lot from Abraham Stern. The architects filed plans with the New York City Department of Buildings in July 1900, at which point the Yale Club began soliciting bids from general contractors. The club ultimately hired Marc Eidlitz & Son, which began work that October. The building had cost $250,000 (equivalent to $9,675,000 in 2025) in total. Including furnishings, the clubhouse had cost $300,000.

The clubhouse officially opened on May 1, 1901. One Yale Club member said at the time: "It will be an easy matter to look down upon the Harvard and throw bouquets to them when there is occasion for doing so." Yale Club members had already rented many of the bedrooms, which were offered at prices ranging from $6 to $15 per night. When the building opened, several architectural magazines described the clubhouse's design. The New York Times praised the clubhouse as "one of the best appointed in the city". During the 1900s, most of the clubhouse's bedrooms were leased to members on a long-term basis. In addition, the clubhouse hosted other events such as ping-pong tournaments and sports-team celebrations. The club continued to grow, leading the Yale Alumni Weekly to say in 1912: "The Yale Club has become a permanent and all-the-year-round necessity."

By early 1912, the club had more than three thousand members, who could not all fit within 30 West 44th Street. As a result, the Yale Club began looking for sites on which to build a larger clubhouse. That May, the club decided to lease a site two blocks east, at Vanderbilt Avenue and 44th Street, within the Terminal City area adjoining Grand Central Terminal. Yale alumnus James Gamble Rogers designed a 22-story clubhouse on the site at 50 Vanderbilt Avenue, and construction began in 1913. The Vanderbilt Avenue clubhouse opened in June 1915, and the Yale Club vacated its old headquarters at 30 West 44th Street. The clubhouse's main entrance was slightly truncated, and a recessed areaway in front of the building was removed, when the New York City government widened 44th Street in 1916.

=== Subsequent club use ===
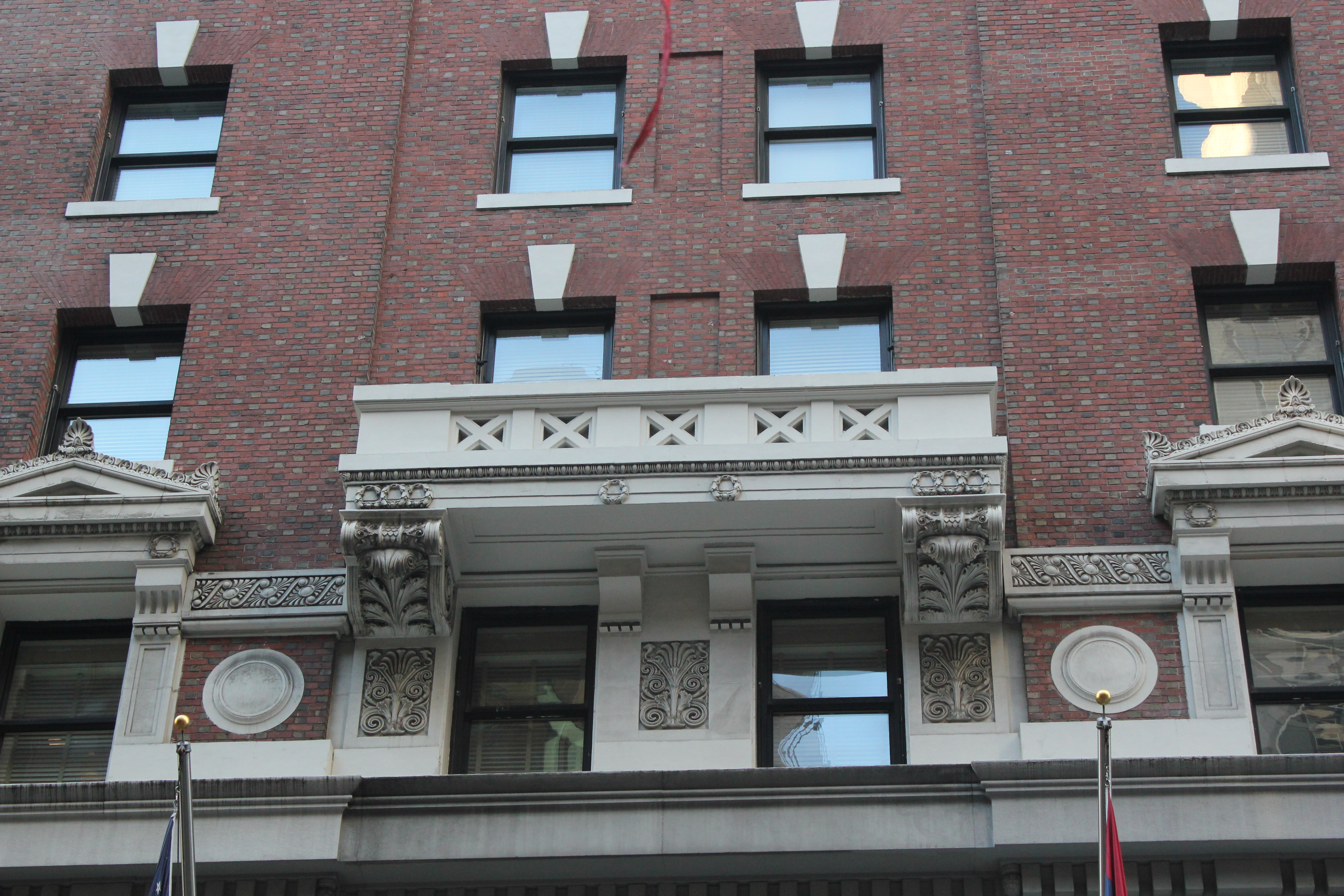
Detail of fourth-floor balcony as seen in 2021

The Yale Club sold an option on the building in April 1916 to another club, which the Yale Club's president declined to identify. A holding company, operated by Delta Kappa Epsilon (DKE) fraternity, bought 30 West 44th Street in July 1916. At the time, the building was valued at $390,000. The fraternity's members were spread across 35 chapters and 43 alumni associations, but DKE did not have a central headquarters. DKE spent $75,000 renovating the clubhouse. The ground-floor and basement entrances were modified, and Oswald C. Hering and Douglas Fitch designed a penthouse with locker rooms and squash courts. DKE dedicated the clubhouse on January 12, 1917, with 400 guests attending a party on the tenth floor. DKE stayed in the building for eight years. The clubhouse hosted events such as fundraisers, the fraternity's 75th-anniversary celebration, and a dinner for former Cuban president Mario García Menocal.

By 1925, DKE wished to sell the building at 30 West 44th Street and relocate to larger headquarters. The Army and Navy Club of America bought the building in June 1925, although DKE planned to remain in the building until it found a new clubhouse. The Army and Navy Club had been forced to relocate from its previous clubhouse at 112 West 59th Street, which had been sold to a developer that February. DKE leased space for a new clubhouse at 5 East 51st Street in August 1925 and relocated there. The Army and Navy Club moved into the building that October. The club's finances suffered in subsequent years, as the enactment of Prohibition in the United States in 1919 had caused the club's membership to decline. The Army and Navy Club filed for bankruptcy in June 1933; at the time, the Army and Navy Club only had 500 members and was struggling to collect $40,000 in membership dues. The clubhouse closed at the end of that month.

A foreclosure auction was scheduled for the building in September 1933, and the United States Trust Company acquired the building the next month. Following a $136,000 deficiency judgment against the Army and Navy Club, United States Trust deeded the property to the Thirty West Forty-fourth Street Corporation in December 1933. The building was unoccupied through the 1930s. A client of John Buzzini had leased the building in October 1935, with plans to open a coed clubhouse there. Under the terms of the lease, the lessee had an option to purchase the building at a later date. However, the planned clubhouse was canceled. A client of William H. Whiting acquired the building in August 1939, with plans to spend $250,000 converting the structure into apartments. Charles N. and Selig Whinston drew up plans to renovate the building, in which the facade ornamentation would have been removed, but these plans also did not proceed.

The New York Herald Tribune reported in September 1942 that the building had been sold, although the United States Trust Company denied the news. 30 West 44th Street was placed for sale in November 1942. The same month, real estate developer Harry Ginsberg bought the building, assuming $17,000 in unpaid mortgages and $35,000 in back taxes; he co-owned the building with his brother Morris, a manufacturer.

=== Mid-20th century ===
==== United States government ====
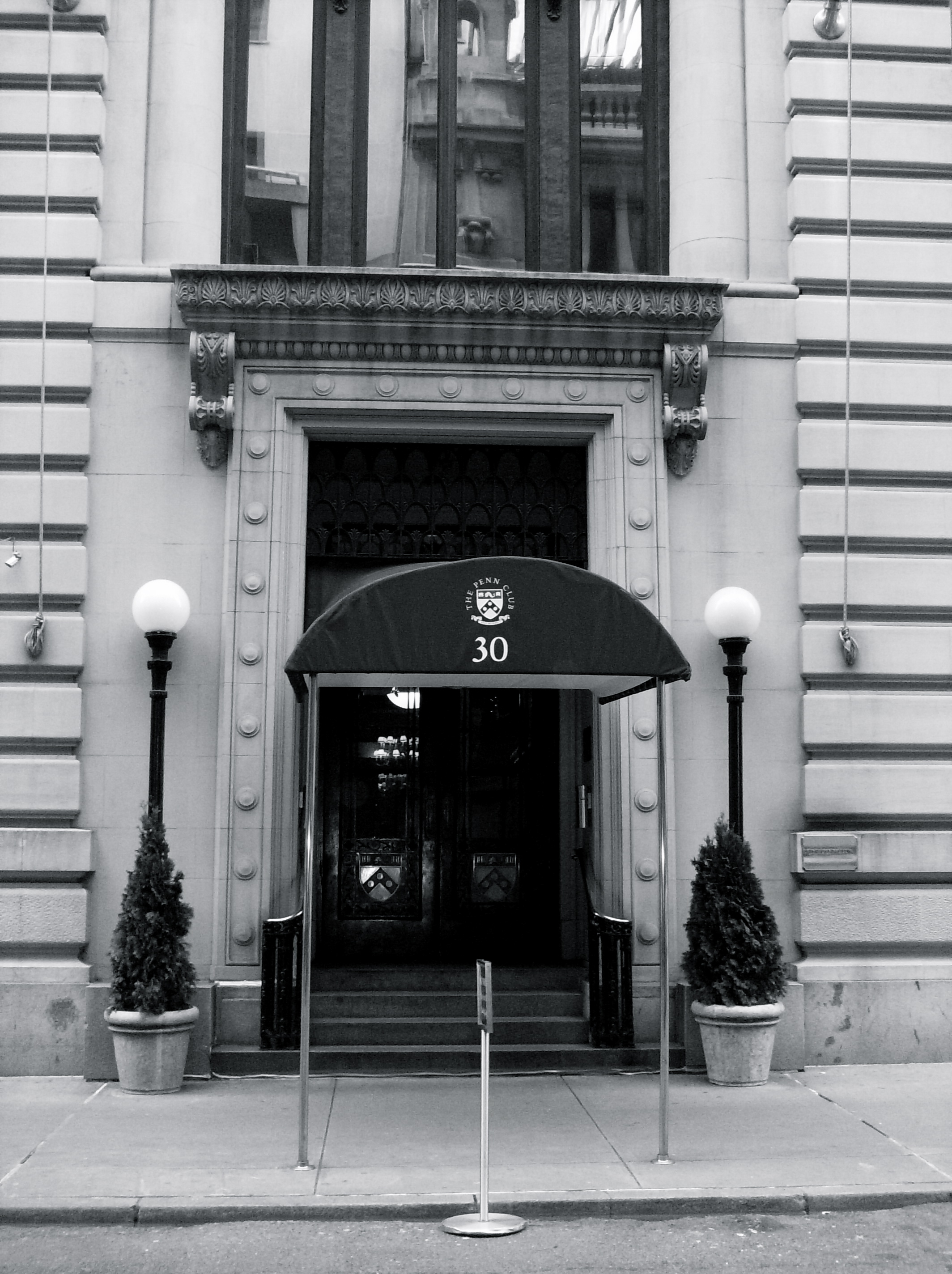
Main entrance as seen in 2007

The Ginsberg brothers sold 30 West 44th Street to the United States Maritime Service for $65,000 in December 1943, and the Maritime Service opened its regional headquarters there in June 1944. It contained a graduate station, which assigned apprentice sailors to ships; several classrooms for the Maritime Service Institute; an office and recreation center for the Maritime Service's shore patrol; and bedrooms for 200 or 300 sailors at a time. During World War II, 30 West 44th Street was known as the United States Maritime Building. 30 West 44th Street became the Civilian Naval Reserve Center after the war ended, housing civilian soldiers.

The government of the United States announced in December 1947 that it would convert 30 West 44th Street to offices for the Organized Reserve, which was to relocate from various locations in Manhattan. According to a later owner, the building's floor slabs could accommodate heavy loads, and the structure itself was built "like a fortress". The Organized Reserve moved several of its divisions into the building in March 1948, and the Organized Reserve offices opened the next month, with an unofficial open house celebrating Armed Forces Day. 30 West 44th Street subsequently became the Army Reserves Building. The first floor was converted into a lounge and dining room, while the second floor was refitted with a pair of conference rooms. The upper floors housed such divisions as Adjutant General and Ordnance Corps on the third floor; Quartermaster and Coast Artillery Corps on the fourth floor; Military Intelligence and Armored Cavalry on the fifth floor; infantry units, Signal Corps, and Military Police on the sixth floor; and the 22nd Field Artillery Regiment and Army Corps of Engineers on the seventh and eighth floors. The ninth floor contained various offices, while the 77th Infantry Division's headquarters staff took up the top two stories.

The General Services Administration (GSA) managed 30 West 44th Street along with other federally owned buildings in New York City. The Organized Reserve opened the Army Reserve School, a seven-story training center, at the building in March 1951. The training center at 44th Street quickly became one of the largest such schools operated by the United States Army, with 700 students in 1953. John V. Lindsay, who served in the United States House of Representatives from 1959 to 1965, operated a district office during his time as a U.S. representative for New York's 17th congressional district. The building also contained the offices of the Army Relief Society, an organization for soldiers' widows and their children, during the 1960s. The 301st Logistical Command trained at 30 West 44th Street, and the 306th Special Services Company, an entertainment unit of the U.S. Army, also used the building as its headquarters. By the early 1970s, the federal government no longer needed the building. Columbia University and City College of New York both expressed interest in acquiring 30 West 44th Street and using it as an office.

==== Touro College ====
The federal government gave the building to Touro College, a then-newly established Jewish college, in early 1971. Although Touro had received 30 West 44th Street for free, the structure was valued at $1.3 million. Touro renovated 30 West 44th Street and rented a temporary headquarters for about one year. Touro had wanted to open a law school near 30 West 44th Street in 1974, but Touro soon became involved in various controversies. The college also encountered difficulties opening its law school and acquiring other buildings for its campus. By 1979, Touro had 2,200 students, but its main building was still at 30 West 44th Street. The Touro Law Center eventually opened at 30 West 44th Street in 1981, and the college bought a main building on 26th Street. The law school quickly outgrew the 44th Street building and moved to Huntington Station, New York, in 1982.

=== Penn Club ===
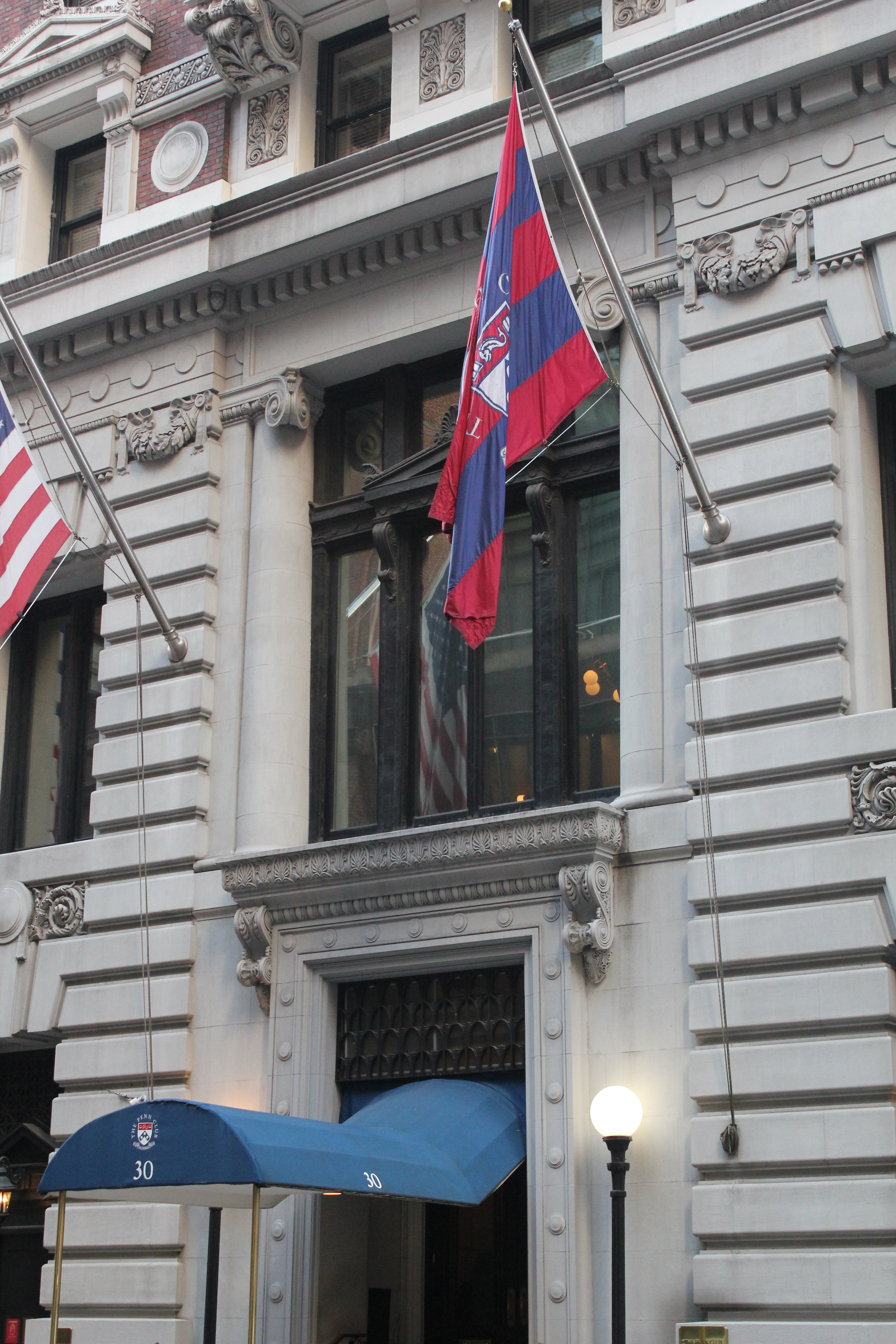
Flag outside the entrance as seen in 2021

The University of Pennsylvania (also known as Penn) bought the building for $15 million in 1989. Touro used the proceeds from the sale to develop new buildings on Lexington Avenue and in Brooklyn. The university's alumni association, the Penn Club of New York, had no permanent clubhouse in New York City at the time, even though there were 28,000 Penn alumni in the New York metropolitan area. Other Ivy League colleges such as Harvard, Yale, Cornell, and Princeton all had clubhouses for their alumni in Midtown Manhattan, and Penn officials believed that the lack of a dedicated Penn clubhouse was negatively affecting undergraduate enrollment. A spokesperson for the Penn Club said 30 West 44th Street had been selected for its proximity to Manhattan's Theater District, Grand Central Terminal, and other universities' alumni clubs.

The club planned to raise an additional $25 million for renovations and had already raised $5 million at the time of its purchase. These included donations from Penn alumni Leonard Lauder, Ronald Lauder, Saul Steinberg, Michael Milken, and Ronald Perelman. The interior was completely rebuilt and was expanded to 14 stories, but the facade was restored to its original condition. According to renovation architect David P. Helpern, the building had "a wonderful, wonderful facade" that was more evocative of the Penn campus than of the Yale campus. 30 West 44th Street reopened in June 1994, becoming the Penn Club's first permanent headquarters since the 1920s. The club had 10,000 members soon after the clubhouse opened. However, the club's membership had declined to 6,500 by 1998, prompting the club to accept some non-Penn alumni. Under a reciprocity agreement with the Princeton Club of New York, members of the Princeton and Penn clubs could visit each other's clubhouses.

Penn's alumni magazine The Pennsylvania Gazette wrote that the clubhouse hosted events such as "monthly wine tastings, business gatherings, happy hours, and speaker series", as well as parties. The New York City Landmarks Preservation Commission considered designating 30 West 44th Street as a city landmark in mid-2009 and formally did so on February 9, 2010. After the Penn Club hired a new general manager in 2014, it spent $750,000 to renovate the clubhouse's guest rooms. In 2017, members of the Columbia University Club of New York also began using the clubhouse at 30 West 44th Street as part of a reciprocity agreement with the Penn Club.

== See also ==
- List of New York City Designated Landmarks in Manhattan from 14th to 59th Streets
