= Cornell Club of New York =

Social club in New York City

Coordinates: 40°45′16″N 73°58′45.5″W

The Cornell Club of New York

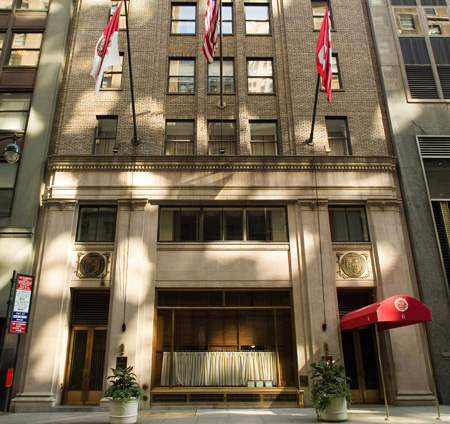
- Nickname: Cornell Club
- Founded: 1889; 137 years ago
- Type: Private social club
- Location: 6 East 44th Street, New York City, NY, U.S.
- Services: Hotel, dining, fitness, meetings
- Members: 6,000+ globally
- Affiliations: Cornell University; though an independently operated alumni club
- Website: cornellclubnyc.com

The Cornell Club of New York, usually referred to as The Cornell Club, is a private club in Midtown Manhattan, New York City. Its membership is restricted to alumni, active and retired faculty of Cornell University, family of Cornellians, business associates of members, and graduates of The Club's affiliate schools.

The Cornell Club's clubhouse is a fourteen-story building located at 6 East 44th Street between Madison Avenue and Fifth Avenue.

== History ==
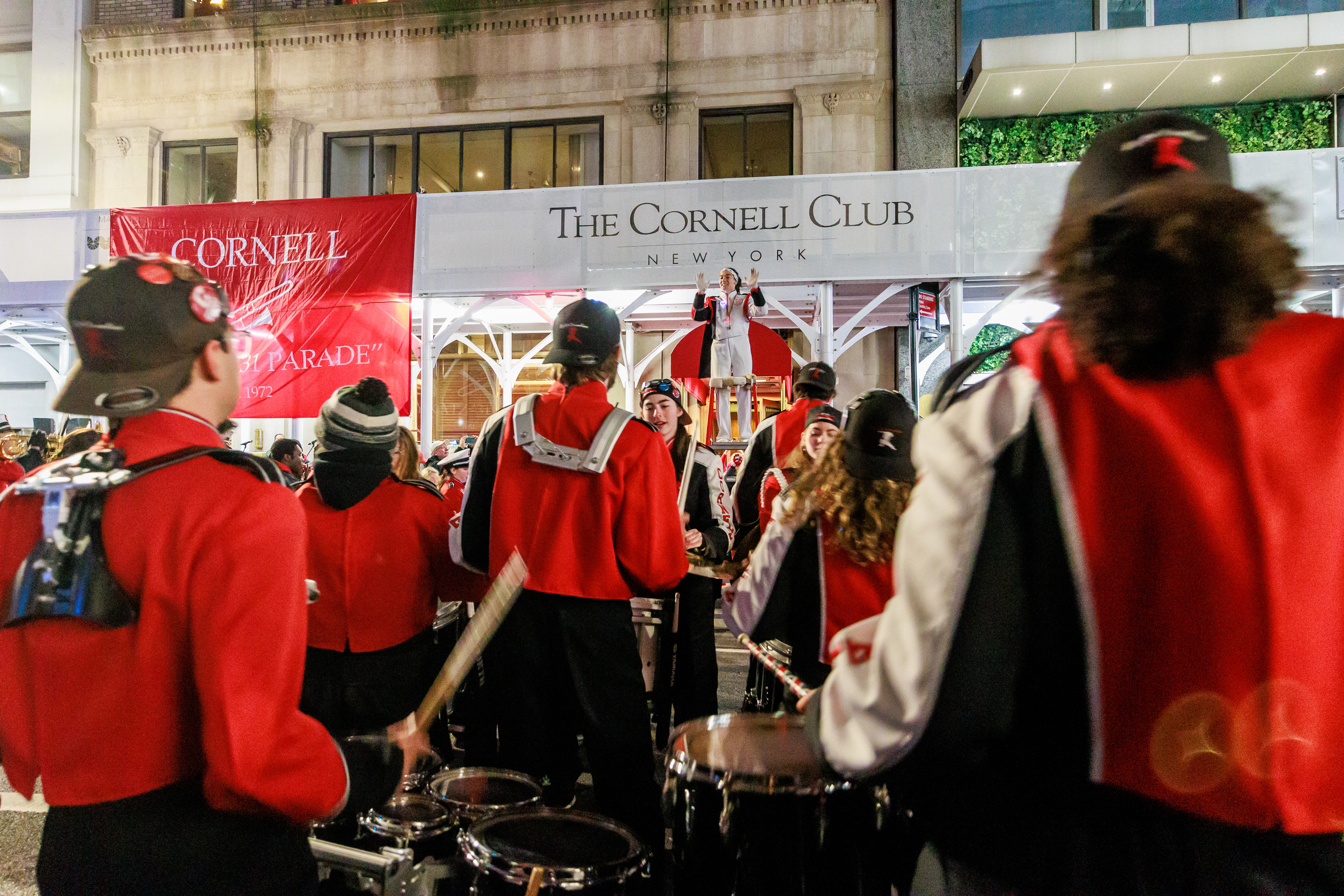
The Cornell Big Red Marching Band performs in front of the Cornell Club at the finish of the 2024 Sy Katz Parade

In 1889, the first Cornell Club was formed by Cornell University graduates. The current 14-story clubhouse located in midtown Manhattan at 6 East 44th Street was formerly the offices of the Chicago Pneumatic Tool Company. The building was a gift to the university and was renovated by San Francisco-based Gensler & Associates. The clubhouse opened its doors on December 1, 1989.

Past locations:

- 1900: The Royalton Apartment Hotel on West 44th Street
- 1901: 65 Park Avenue and Madison Avenue at 38th Street
- 1939: The Hotel Barclay (now the Inter-Continental) at 48th Street
- 1962: 50th Street at Third Avenue
- 1982: The Women's National Headquarters and NYU's townhall facility

== Membership and benefits ==
Membership in the Cornell Club is restricted to alumni, faculty, and students of Cornell University along with alumni of ten affiliated colleges and universities: Brown, Colgate, Duke, Notre Dame, Rensselaer Polytechnic Institute, Stanford, St. Lawrence University, Trinity College Dublin, Tulane, and Wake Forest. Most members are alumni of Cornell University.

All members enjoy full use of the clubhouse facilities and its services. The Club includes a bar, The Big Red Tap & Grill, and a restaurant, The Cayuga Room. In addition, the club has four banquet/meeting rooms, a business center, 48 overnight guest rooms, and a library. Members may use the squash courts at the Yale Club of New York City.

Dues are on a sliding scale, based on age and proximity to the club. Like most private clubs, members of the club are given reciprocal benefits at clubs around the United States and the world.

== See also ==
- Columbia University Club of New York
- Harvard Club of Boston
- Harvard Club of New York City
- Penn Club of New York City
- Princeton Club of New York
- The Yale Club of New York City
- List of American gentlemen's clubs
