= Penn Club of New York =

Social club in Manhattan, New York

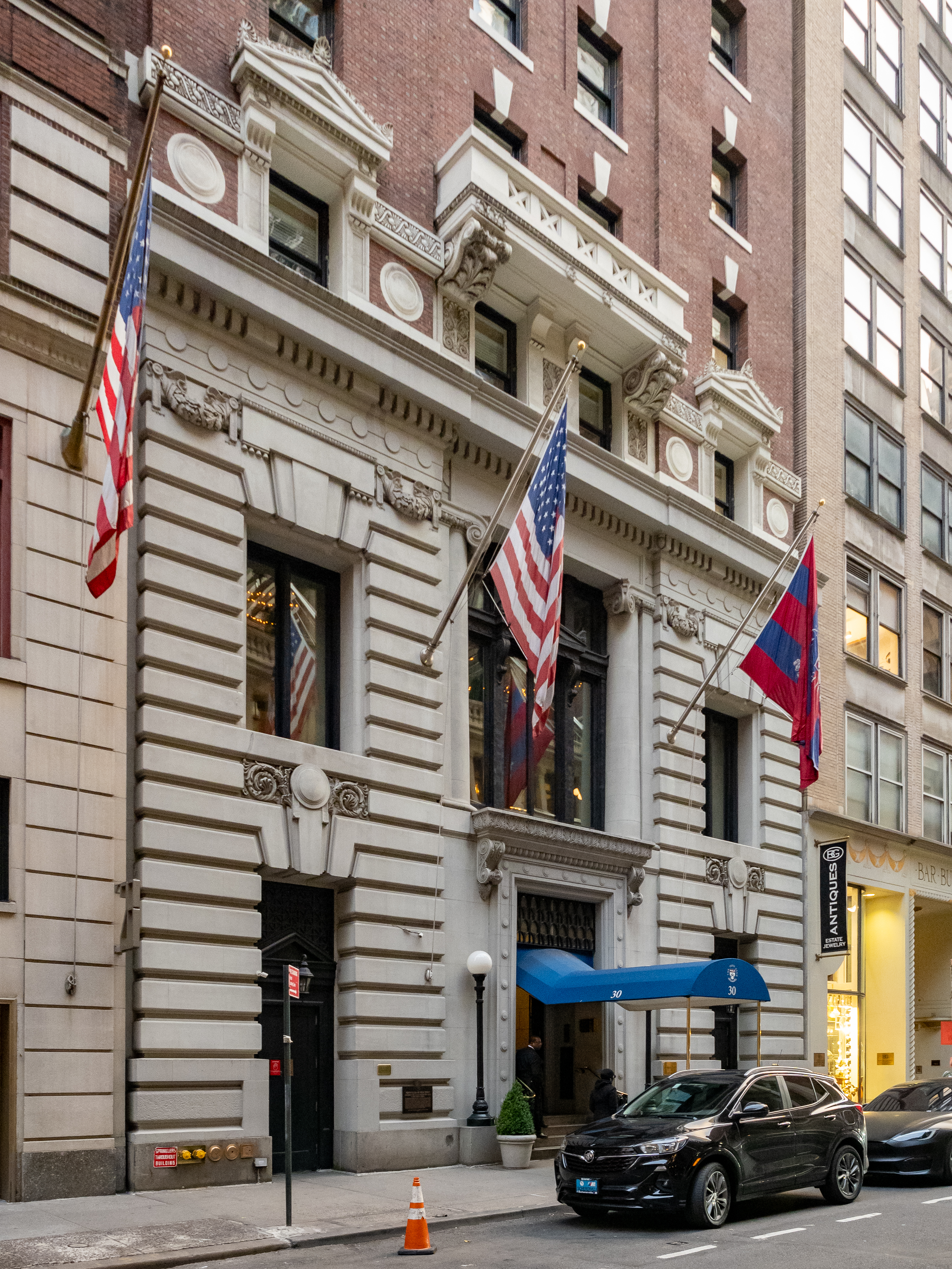
- Nickname: Penn Club
- Formation: 1900; 126 years ago (incorporated)
- Type: Private social club
- Headquarters: 30 West 44th Street
- Location: Manhattan, New York, United States
- Services: Library, business center, fitness center, yoga studio, Yale Club Squash Court reciprocity Meeting rooms, fine dining, casual restaurant, bar, hotel, spa, massage, events
- Members: 5,000+ globally
- Affiliations: University of Pennsylvania; though an independently operated alumni club
- Revenue: $15,562,013 (2025)
- Award: Platinum Club of America (consecutively)
- Website: pennclub.org

The Penn Club of New York (usually referred to as Penn Club) is a private club located on Clubhouse Row in the Midtown Manhattan neighborhood of New York City. Its membership is restricted to alumni, active and retired faculty of the University of Pennsylvania, as well graduates of The Club's affiliate schools. The club's 14-story building, which is a designated landmark, is located at 30 West 44th Street and initially was occupied by The Yale Club of New York City.

For 2023–2024, the Penn Club was named to the list of the Top 50 City Clubs and was ranked the second-best city club in New York City by Platinum Clubs of America.

The club has status under 501(c)(7) Social and Recreation Clubs; in 2025 it claimed $15,562,013 in total revenue and $28,448,135 in total assets. The Thirty West Forty Fourth Street Foundation for the Penn Club's preservation and restoration has status as a 501(c)(3) Public Charity. In 2024 it claimed $317,220 in total revenue and $675,730 in total assets.

== History ==
In November 1886, the first local group of University of Pennsylvania alumni outside of Philadelphia was formed in New York over dinner at Delmonico's Restaurant. At the alumni group's annual banquet at the Waldorf Astoria Hotel in January 1900, they presented a plan to secure "a convenient suite of rooms in the middle of the city, adjacent to a cafe."

=== Royalton Hotel (W. 44th Street) ===
On October 6, 1900, the Penn Club of New York opened in four groundfloor rooms in the Royalton Hotel, just 200 feet (61 m) next door to today's clubhouse. It soon had more than 150 members at a time when only 400 alumni lived in the New York area, and received its charter from the New York Legislature in 1901.

=== Hotel Stanley (W. 47th Street) ===
In 1905, the Club moved to "new and commodious quarters" in Hotel Stanley at 124 West 47th Street, where it remained until 1910. Between 1911 and 1922 (during World War I), the club temporarily did away with a clubhouse, instead focusing on their annual banquet.

=== Townhouses (E. 50th Street) ===
In 1922, after a three-year search, the club's directors leased two townhouses on East 50th Street, next to today's New York Palace Hotel. Throughout the 1920s, the Penn Club on East 50th Street was active and successful. Its dining and guest rooms were regularly filled and its dinners and programs were highly attended. During the Great Depression in 1935, it vacated its townhouses.

=== Cornell Club, Phi Gamma Delta Club, and Biltmore Hotel (E. 38th-W. 56th Streets) ===
Thereafter, it shared space in the Cornell Club formerly on East 38th Street, moved to two other clubs, and landed in the Phi Gamma Delta Club on West 56th Street, where it remained until 1961, when it moved to the Biltmore Hotel. The Club stayed in the Biltmore Hotel until the hotel was gutted and made an office tower in 1981 by Paul Milstein.

=== Former Yale Club at 30 West 44th Street ===
The Penn Club's next clubhouse was at 30 West 44th Street, developed for the Yale Club of New York City and opened on May 1, 1901. The Yale Club occupied the clubhouse until 1915. The building was next occupied by the newly-organized Delta Kappa Epsilon, the Army and Navy Club of America, the federal government of the United States, the Organized Reserve Corps of the Army, the Army Reserve School, and Touro College.

In 1989, university trustees bought the then-11 story building at 30 West 44th Street for $15 million. After raising an additional $25 million from 50 alumni (including $150,000+ donations each from Estee Lauder heirs Leonard Lauder and Ronald Lauder, billionaire Saul Steinberg, Milken Institute founder Michael Milken, and Ronald Perelman) to commission David P. Helpern Architects for two years of renovation including a three-level addition for its current 14-story building, the Penn Club Of New York moved to its current location on West 44th Street between Fifth Avenue and Sixth Avenue, opening its owned-doors to annual dues-paying members in 1994. Penn alumni Bennett Weinstock and Judie Weinstock imported numerous furniture pieces for the clubhouse, including brass chandeliers, walnut tables, and vases. In 1996, Donald Trump (Wharton 1968), later the 45th and 47th U.S. President donated $100,000 to the Penn Club, the same year Don Jr. '00 gained Penn admission. For this gift, Trump was named a founder of the Penn Club.

30 West 44th Street was the first university clubhouse in New York City to be designed as a high-rise structure. All prior, multi-story clubhouses (e.g., the University Club of New York) were designed as low-rise buildings. Designed by Tracy and Swartwout in the Beaux-Arts style, the ornately decorated facade is made of brick, Indiana limestone, and architectural terracotta by the New York Architectural Terra-Cotta Company. The first two stories are clad with rusticated limestone blocks, while the upper stories are largely clad with brick and terracotta. Above the base, the facade is split into a six-story midsection, a three-story mansard roof, and a three-story setback penthouse.

== Amenities ==
Members have access to the 14-story clubhouse, including its Benjamin Franklin Room, featuring a private library for book loans, piano, fireplace, and paintings of former Penn leaders such as Franklin on oak-paneled walls. The business center has coworking spaces, while the Palestra Fitness Center and yoga studio. Penn Club has a members-only website and app directory, with committees for member networking.

Other services include meeting room rentals, bars on event room floors, and two restaurants: the two-story, dining room; and themed Grill Room, accessed by a spiral marble staircase beneath the foyer, featuring a mahogany bar, recreation of the Old King Cole mural, Penn memorabilia, other furnishings, and a sushi chef.

=== Hotel rooms ===
Guests can rent rooms on five floors.

=== Social networking on Clubhouse Row and worldwide ===
The club offers cross-registration for All-Ivy events hosted by neighboring clubs, while holding annual events including the All-Ivy New Year's Eve Party.

The Penn Club is located on Clubhouse Row along with the Harvard Club of New York City at 27 West 44th, the New York Yacht Club at 37 West 44th, the Yale Club of New York City on East 44th, and the Cornell Club of New York at 6 East 44th.

On the same block, the New York City Bar Association Building and Royalton Hotel are to the west, while the General Society of Mechanics and Tradesmen Building, the Century Association Clubhouse, and Hotel Mansfield are to the east. Other buildings on the street include the Algonquin, Iroquois, and Sofitel New York hotels to the northwest. A Penn Club spokesperson said 30 West 44th Street was selected for its proximity to Manhattan's Theater District, Grand Central Terminal, and other alumni clubhouses.

== Membership ==
Penn Club membership requires applications, initiation fees, annual dues, and charge accounts, and are restricted to alumni, faculty, and students of drinking age of the University of Pennsylvania, with a shortlist of schools able to share club access as affiliate members, including Princeton University and Columbia University (in effect causing the building to house three of the eight Ivies), along with a few other colleges: MIT, University of Chicago, Vanderbilt University, Emory University, New York University, Williams College, Villanova University, and Fordham University.

The Princeton Club of New York formerly at 15 West 43rd whose members and part of the staff were absorbed and now belong to the Penn Club as in-residence, following a previous visiting reciprocity agreement between the Princeton-Penn Clubs before Princeton's went out of business during COVID. The club offers legacy membership admissions to spouses, adult children, and adult grandchildren of Penn-affiliated members for the same financial requirements.

With more than 5,000 members around the world, The Penn Club is controlled by its annual due-paying members and professionally managed by staff, although the University of Pennsylvania owns the clubhouse building and leases it to the club, a 501(c)7 not-for-profit entity. Penn's development and alumni relations department maintains a regional office in the clubhouse.

== In popular culture ==
- In the first episode of Season 5 of The Apprentice, the winning team was rewarded with lunch with Donald Trump at the Penn Club.

== See also ==
- Princeton Club of New York
- Columbia University Club of New York
- List of American gentlemen's clubs
