= Columbia University Club of New York =

Alumni organization in New York City

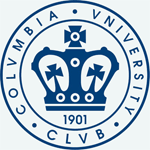
- Formation: 1901; 125 years ago
- Type: Private social club
- Headquarters: 30 West 44th Street
- Location: Manhattan, New York, United States
- Region served: New York metropolitan area
- Members: 3,000+ globally
- Affiliations: Columbia University; though an independently operated alumni club
- Website: http://www.columbiaclub.org

The Columbia University Club of New York is a private university alumni club that extends membership to all graduates and their families of all the schools and affiliates of Columbia University, as well as Columbia undergraduate students, graduate students, faculty and administrators. In 2005, the Club had more than 2,000 Columbia members representing all the schools and affiliates of Columbia University.

Members benefit from numerous business and professional opportunities, lectures and social events, and use of the Penn Club of New York's clubhouse at 30 West 44th Street in Midtown Manhattan where it is in residence. The Penn Club facilities contain a lounge, business center, library, bar, formal and casual dining rooms, conference and meeting rooms, event rooms, overnight guestrooms, a complete athletic facility, and reciprocal use of various clubs throughout the world.

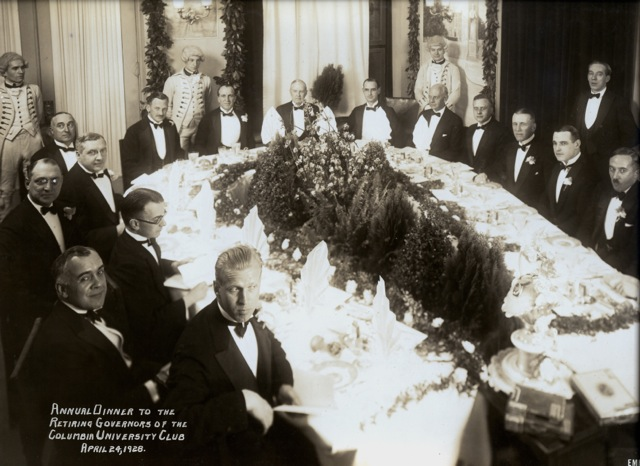
Annual dinner to the retiring governors of the Columbia University Club. April 24, 1928.

== History ==
The Columbia University Club was founded in 1901 by recent graduates of Columbia University. The Club had 1,000 members in 1910. By the early 1970s, in need of capital, and down to less than 500 members, it sold the building to the Unification Church of the Rev. Sun Myung Moon. It has not had its own clubhouse since 1972, and has instead been "in residence" at various other New York City based clubs, as listed below:

- 1901–1915: Gramercy Park
- 1915–1972: 4 West 43rd St

=== In Residence ===
- 1977–1980: Cornell Club of New York
- 1980–1993: Women's National Republican Club
- 1994–1998: Williams Club
- 1998–2017: Princeton Club of New York

=== At the Penn Club ===
Since March 2017, the Columbia University Club operates under an in-residence agreement with the Penn Club, which allows the Columbia University Club to reside and maintain operations at the Penn Club, and allows its members use of Penn Club's facilities. The Columbia University Club is administered by its Board of Governors and maintains its own administrative committees, which are separate and distinct from the administration of the Penn Club.

The Williams Club, where the Columbia Club used to be in-residence, is now also in residence at the Penn Club. The Williams Club sold their clubhouse in 2010.

== Membership ==
Membership at the Columbia University Club is open to all alumni and their families of all the schools and affiliates of Columbia University, as well as undergraduate students, graduate students, faculty and administrators.

== See also ==
- Penn Club of New York
- List of gentlemen's clubs in the United States
