= Princeton Club of New York =

University-affiliated club

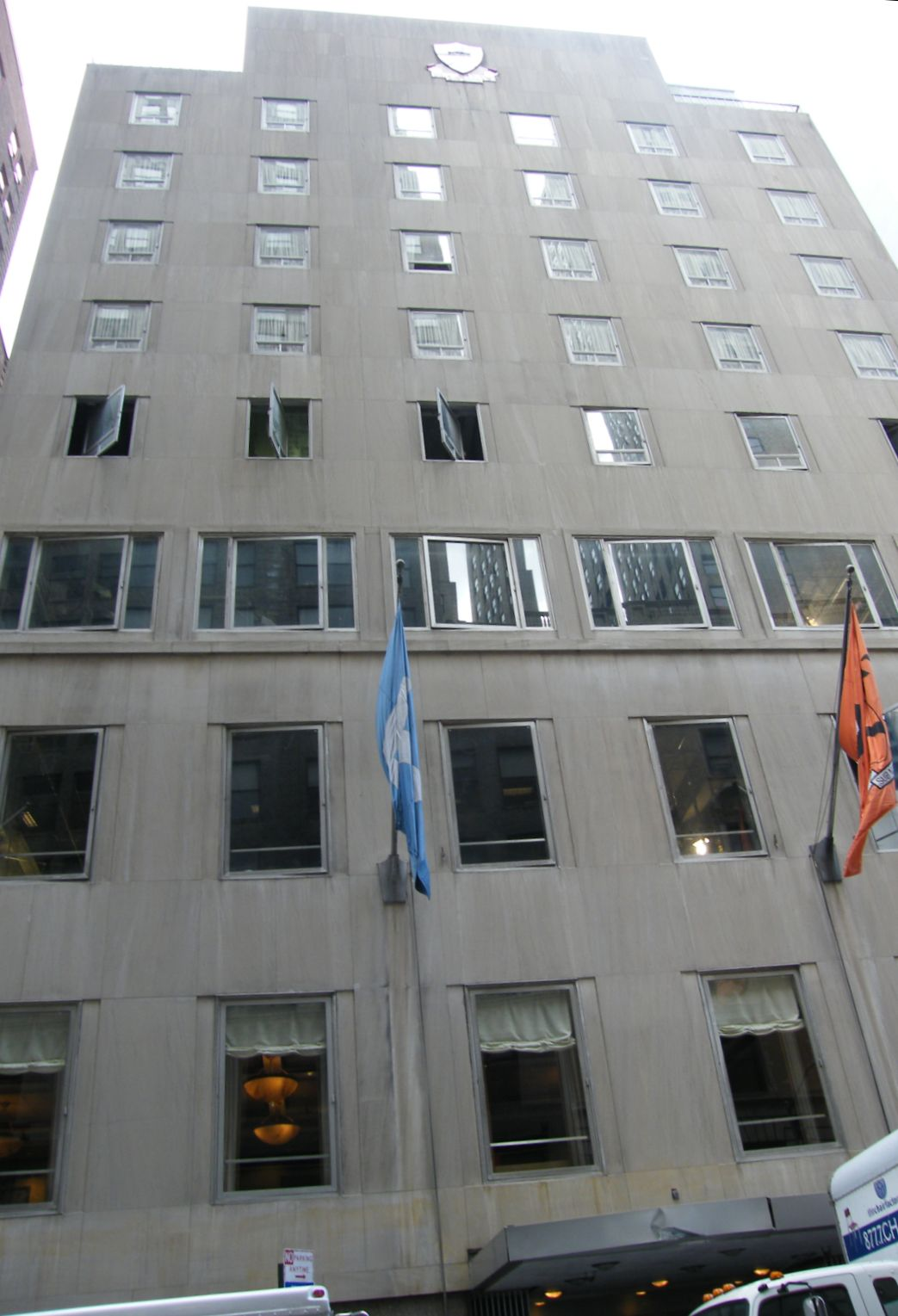
- Successor: Merged into Penn Club of New York
- Formation: December 12, 1866; 159 years ago
- Defunct: 2021
- Type: Private social club
- Legal status: Social and recreational club
- Location: New York City, NY, U.S.
- Region served: New York metropolitan area

The Princeton Club of New York was a private clubhouse located at 15 West 43rd Street in Midtown Manhattan, New York City, New York, founded in 1866 as the Princeton Alumni Association of New York. It reorganized to its current name in 1886. Its membership was composed of alumni and faculty of Princeton University, as well as 15 other affiliated schools.

In 2021, the club defaulted on its $40 million mortgage debt and the property was foreclosed. The building was sold in December 2023 for $8 million by a shell company later revealed to be owned by John Paulson.

== History ==
The club was founded as the Princeton Alumni Association of New York in 1866. In 1886, it reorganized as the Princeton Club of New York, incorporating as a club under New York laws on December 12, 1899. Unlike other alumni clubs on Clubhouse Row, the organization had no financial relation to Princeton University.

Since its incorporation, the club had four homes, with its final location being at 15 West 43rd Street in Manhattan from February 1963 to December 2023. The clubhouse was located on Clubhouse Row, where many of New York City's other clubs are located.

The club closed in March 2020 during the early days of the COVID-19 pandemic and never fully reopened, losing approximately one-third of its fees-paying members during the initial year of closure. In October 2021, the club defaulted on $39.3 million in mortgage debt from lender Sterling National Bank. In December 2021, 15 West 43rd Street LLC purchased the defaulted loan from Sterling and in June 2022 the LLC sued to foreclose on the property. 15 West 43rd Street LLC, a shell company, bought the building in December 2023 for $8 million and placed it for sale in early 2025. The clubhouse's owner at the time was the billionaire John Paulson.

The Columbia University Club of New York was in residence at the Princeton Club from 1998 to 2017, when it left to become in-residence at The Penn Club at 30 West 44th Street. Similarly, the in-residence Williams Club also moved to the Penn Club of New York in March 2022 following the closure of the Princeton Club.

== Amenities ==
The ten-story club featured a variety of amenities for its members, including two restaurants, banquet space, a fitness center, squash courts, and 58 guest rooms. The club featured 9,000 square feet (840 m^{2}), where it hosted events throughout the year for its members.

== Membership ==
Membership in the Princeton Club was restricted to alumni, faculty, and students of Princeton University, as well as 15 other affiliated colleges and universities, reporting approximately 6,000 members in its final years

== See also ==
- Penn Club of New York
- Columbia University Club of New York
- Williams Club
- List of American gentlemen's clubs
