= National Register of Historic Places listings in Oneida County, New York =

Location of Oneida County in New York

This is intended to be a complete list of properties and districts listed on the National Register of Historic Places in Oneida County, New York. The locations of National Register properties and districts (at least for all showing latitude and longitude coordinates below) may be seen in a map by clicking on "Map of all coordinates". Seven of the properties are further designated National Historic Landmarks.

This National Park Service list is complete through NPS recent listings posted July 31, 2026.

Contents: Counties in New York
Albany (Albany) – Allegany – Bronx – Broome – Cattaraugus – Cayuga – Chautauqua – Chemung – Chenango – Clinton – Columbia – Cortland – Delaware – Dutchess (Poughkeepsie, Rhinebeck) – Erie (Buffalo) – Essex – Franklin – Fulton – Genesee – Greene – Hamilton – Herkimer – Jefferson – Kings – Lewis – Livingston – Madison – Monroe (Rochester) – Montgomery – Nassau – New York (Below 14th Street, 14th to 59th Streets, 59th to 110th Streets, Above 110th Street, Islands) – Niagara (Niagara Falls) – Oneida – Onondaga (Syracuse) – Ontario – Orange – Orleans – Oswego – Otsego – Putnam – Queens – Rensselaer – Richmond – Rockland – St. Lawrence – Saratoga – Schenectady – Schoharie – Schuyler – Seneca – Steuben – Suffolk – Sullivan – Tioga – Tompkins – Ulster – Warren – Washington – Wayne – Westchester (Northern, Southern, New Rochelle, Peekskill, Yonkers) – Wyoming – Yates

== Listings county-wide ==
	Name on the Register	Image	Date listed	Location	City or town	Description
1	Arsenal House	Arsenal House	July 18, 1974 (#74001284)	514 W. Dominick St. 43°12′56″N 75°28′04″W	Rome	
2	Ava Town Hall	Ava Town Hall	May 18, 1992 (#92000453)	NY 26 south of the junction with Ava Rd. 43°25′00″N 75°28′50″W	Ava	
3	Avalon Knitting Company Mill	Avalon Knitting Company Mill	March 7, 2023 (#100008605)	728 Broad St. 43°05′59″N 75°12′50″W	Utica	
4	Bagg's Square East Historic District	Bagg's Square East Historic District	July 24, 2017 (#100001362)	Broad, Catherine, 1st, John, Main, Oriskany, Railroad & 2nd Sts. 43°06′11″N 75°13′24″W	Utica	Downtown area with buildings that served canal and railroad traffic from late 19th to mid-20th century
5	The Beeches Historic District		April 28, 2023 (#100008881)	7900 Turin Rd. 43°14′41″N 75°27′19″W	Rome	
6	Black River Canal Warehouse	Black River Canal Warehouse	March 7, 2003 (#03000093)	502 Water St. 43°28′52″N 75°19′40″W	Boonville	
7	Boonville Historic District	Boonville Historic District	November 16, 1979 (#79001608)	Schuyler, Post, W. Main and Summit Sts. 43°29′04″N 75°20′13″W	Boonville	
8	Brick Store Building	Brick Store Building	April 26, 1996 (#96000486)	Jct. of US 20 and NY 8; 42°52′44″N 75°15′07″W	Bridgewater	
9	Bridgewater Railroad Station	Bridgewater Railroad Station	April 12, 2006 (#06000264)	US 20; 42°52′45″N 75°14′48″W	Bridgewater	
10	Byington Mill (Frisbie & Stansfield Knitting Company)	Byington Mill (Frisbie & Stansfield Knitting Company)	May 27, 1993 (#93000458)	421-423 Broad St. 43°06′09″N 75°13′18″W	Utica	
11	Calvary Episcopal Church	Calvary Episcopal Church	July 3, 2008 (#08000595)	1101 Howard Ave. 43°05′43″N 75°13′52″W	Utica	
12	Camroden Presbyterian Church	Camroden Presbyterian Church	January 4, 2007 (#06001204)	8049 E. Floyd Rd. 43°15′11″N 75°21′19″W	Floyd	
13	Clinton Village Historic District	Clinton Village Historic District	June 14, 1982 (#82003389)	North, South, East, West Park Rows, Marvin, Williams, Chestnut, Fountain, College and Utica Sts. 43°02′09″N 75°22′51″W	Clinton	
14	Roscoe Conkling House	Roscoe Conkling House	May 15, 1975 (#75001214)	3 Rutger St. 43°05′46″N 75°13′47″W	Utica	
15	Deansboro Railroad Station	Deansboro Railroad Station	November 15, 2002 (#02001327)	2707 NY 315; 42°59′37″N 75°25′38″W	Deansboro	
16	W. H. Dorrance House	W. H. Dorrance House	April 29, 1999 (#99000506)	32 Church St. 43°20′11″N 75°44′39″W	Camden	
17	Downtown Genesee Street Historic District	Downtown Genesee Street Historic District	August 24, 2018 (#100002668)	Generally bounded by Park Ave., Oriskany, John, Park, South, Court & Columbia Sts. 43°06′03″N 75°13′58″W	Utica	
18	Doyle Hardware Building	Doyle Hardware Building	June 10, 1993 (#93000498)	330-334 Main St. 43°06′13″N 75°13′24″W	Utica	
19	Erwin Library and Pratt House	Erwin Library and Pratt House	August 14, 1973 (#73001228)	104 and 106 Schuyler St. 43°29′02″N 75°20′13″W	Boonville	
20	First Baptist Church of Deerfield	First Baptist Church of Deerfield	July 11, 1985 (#85001497)	Herkimer Rd. 43°06′51″N 75°12′08″W	Utica	
21	First Church of Christ, Scientist	First Church of Christ, Scientist	April 28, 2023 (#100008877)	1608 Genesee St. 43°05′29″N 75°15′08″W	Utica	
22	First Congregational Free Church	First Congregational Free Church	January 25, 1979 (#79001609)	177 N. Main St. 42°56′25″N 75°27′38″W	Oriskany Falls	
23	First Methodist Episcopal Church of Rome	First Methodist Episcopal Church of Rome	January 29, 2010 (#09001286)	400 N. George St. 43°12′59″N 75°27′31″W	Rome	
24	First Presbyterian Church	First Presbyterian Church	November 3, 1988 (#88002172)	1605 Genesee St. 43°05′29″N 75°15′01″W	Utica	Church designed by architect Ralph Adams Cram
25	Five Lock Combine and Locks 37 and 38, Black River Canal	Five Lock Combine and Locks 37 and 38, Black River Canal	March 20, 1973 (#73001229)	NY 46; 43°24′11″N 75°21′49″W	Boonville	
26	Gen. William Floyd House	Gen. William Floyd House	June 17, 1971 (#71000549)	W side of Main St. 43°18′22″N 75°23′02″W	Westernville	
27	Forest Hill Cemetery	Forest Hill Cemetery	November 9, 2017 (#100001804)	2201 Oneida St. 43°04′43″N 75°15′26″W	Utica	Non-sectarian cemetery established in 1850 is final resting place of many locally prominent citizens, including Roscoe Conkling and other members of Congress from the late 19th and early 20th centuries
28	Fort Schuyler Club Building	Fort Schuyler Club Building	May 12, 2004 (#04000436)	254 Genesee St. 43°05′59″N 75°14′07″W	Utica	
29	Fort Stanwix National Monument	Fort Stanwix National Monument	October 15, 1966 (#66000057)	Bounded by Dominick, Spring, Liberty, and James Sts. 43°12′42″N 75°27′23″W	Rome	
30	Fort Wood Creek Site		March 14, 2019 (#100003434)	Address Restricted	Rome vicinity	Adjacent to remains of Fort Bull.
31	Fountain Elms	Fountain Elms	November 3, 1972 (#72001599)	318 Genesee St. 43°05′49″N 75°14′29″W	Utica	
32	Gansevoort-Bellamy Historic District	Gansevoort-Bellamy Historic District	November 12, 1975 (#75001213)	Roughly bounded by Liberty, Stuben, and Huntington Sts. to Bissel; 43°12′47″N 75°27′21″W	Rome	
33	Globe Woolen Company Mills	Globe Woolen Company Mills	January 5, 2016 (#15000823)	805, 809, 811-827 Court & 933 Stark Sts; 43°06′09″N 75°14′53″W	Utica	Intact remnant of the city's heritage as a textile manufacturing center operated from 1873 to 1953
34	Grace Church	Grace Church	May 23, 1997 (#97000419)	193 Genesee St. 43°06′03″N 75°13′53″W	Utica	
35	Hamilton College Chapel	Hamilton College Chapel	November 3, 1972 (#72000892)	Hamilton College campus 43°03′07″N 75°24′22″W	Clinton	
36	John C. Hieber Building	John C. Hieber Building	July 24, 2007 (#07000756)	311 Main St. 43°06′15″N 75°13′27″W	Utica	Now home to the Utica Children's Museum
37	Holland Patent Railroad Station	Holland Patent Railroad Station	February 25, 2000 (#00000089)	Park Ave. 43°14′24″N 75°15′17″W	Holland Patent	
38	Holland Patent Stone Churches Historic District	Holland Patent Stone Churches Historic District	November 21, 1991 (#91001670)	Roughly bounded by Main St., Park Ave., Park Pl. and Willow Cr. 43°14′28″N 75°15′26″W	Holland Patent	
39	Hurd & Fitzgerald Building	Hurd & Fitzgerald Building	June 25, 1993 (#93000500)	400 Main St. 43°06′12″N 75°13′22″W	Utica	
40	Jervis Public Library	Jervis Public Library	November 4, 1982 (#82001208)	613 N. Washington St. 43°13′07″N 75°27′16″W	Rome	
41	Lower Genesee Street Historic District	Lower Genesee Street Historic District	October 29, 1982 (#82001209)	Roughly bounded by Genesee, Liberty, Seneca, and Whitesboro Sts. (both sides); 43°06′15″N 75°13′42″W	Utica	
42	Mappa Hall	Mappa Hall	May 12, 1982 (#82003388)	Mappa Ave. 43°16′23″N 75°11′22″W	Barneveld	
43	Memorial Church of the Holy Cross	Memorial Church of the Holy Cross	July 20, 2000 (#00000823)	841 Bleecker St. 43°05′50″N 75°12′49″W	Utica	
44	Middle Mill Historic District	Middle Mill Historic District	May 28, 1976 (#76001254)	NY 5A; 43°06′18″N 75°17′34″W	New York Mills	
45	Millar-Wheeler House	Millar-Wheeler House	February 10, 2000 (#00000093)	1423 Genesee St. 43°05′43″N 75°14′37″W	Utica	
46	Mills House	Mills House	June 13, 1997 (#97000566)	507 N. George St. 43°13′05″N 75°27′28″W	Rome	
47	Munson-Williams-Proctor Arts Institute	Munson-Williams-Proctor Arts Institute	September 9, 2010 (#10000727)	310 Genesee St. 43°05′49″N 75°14′29″W	Utica	
48	Neck Canal of 1730		August 15, 1995 (#95001011)	Cavanaugh Rd. (Co. Rt. 30); 43°07′48″N 75°16′28″W	Marcy	
49	New Century Club	New Century Club	September 12, 1985 (#85002289)	253 Genesee St. 43°05′58″N 75°14′06″W	Utica	
50	New York Central Railroad Adirondack Division Historic District	New York Central Railroad Adirondack Division Historic District	December 23, 1993 (#93001451)	NYCRR Right-of-Way; 43°53′40″N 74°26′26″W	Remsen	
51	New York State Barge Canal	New York State Barge Canal	October 15, 2014 (#14000860)	Linear across county 43°12′06″N 75°26′56″W	Floyd, Lee, Marcy, Remsen, Rome, Sylvan Beach, Trenton, Utica, Verona, Western	Successor to Erie Canal approved by state voters in early 20th century to compete with railroads; listing includes two of canal's reservoirs in Adirondacks.
52	Rev. Asahel Norton Homestead		July 11, 1985 (#85001546)	Norton Rd. 43°03′51″N 75°25′07″W	Kirkland	
53	Olbiston Flats	Olbiston Flats	February 7, 2022 (#100007398)	1431 Genesee St. 43°05′37″N 75°14′50″W	Utica	
54	Oriskany Battlefield	Oriskany Battlefield	October 15, 1966 (#66000558)	5 miles (8.0 km) east of Rome on NY 69; 43°10′07″N 75°22′08″W	Rome	
55	Otter Lake Community Church	Otter Lake Community Church	July 9, 2004 (#04000704)	NY 28; 43°35′30″N 75°06′46″W	Otter Lake	
56	Pleasant Valley Grange Hall	Pleasant Valley Grange Hall	February 12, 1999 (#99000058)	US 20, 2 miles (3.2 km) west of Pleasant Valley; 42°55′02″N 75°26′25″W	Sangerfield	
57	Rome Cemetery		May 31, 2022 (#100007745)	1500 Jervis Ave. 43°14′17″N 75°28′08″W	Rome	
58	Rome Elks Lodge No. 96	Rome Elks Lodge No. 96	June 5, 2013 (#13000359)	126 W. Liberty St; 43°12′44″N 75°27′33″W	Rome	
59	Rome Residential Historic District		January 30, 2025 (#100011346)	Roughly bounded by West Cedar St, North James St, West Liberty St and North Madison St; 43°13′30″N 75°27′03″W	Rome	
60	Elihu Root House	Elihu Root House	November 28, 1972 (#72000893)	101 College Hill Rd. 43°02′59″N 75°24′18″W	Clinton	
61	Rutger-Steuben Park Historic District	Rutger-Steuben Park Historic District	September 19, 1973 (#73001230)	Roughly bounded by Taylor and Howard Aves. including both sides of Rutger Ave. and Steuben Park; 43°05′47″N 75°13′39″W	Utica	
62	St. Joseph's Church	St. Joseph's Church	August 22, 1977 (#77000967)	704-708 Columbia St. 43°06′18″N 75°14′29″W	Utica	
63	St. Mark's Church	St. Mark's Church	August 30, 1996 (#96000957)	19 White St. 43°05′25″N 75°22′47″W	Clark Mills	
64	St. Paul's Church and Cemetery	St. Paul's Church and Cemetery	August 30, 1996 (#96000961)	Rt. 12, junction with Snowden Hill Rd. 43°00′04″N 75°18′53″W	Paris Hill	
65	St. Stephen's Church	St. Stephen's Church	August 30, 1996 (#96000959)	22-27 Oxford St. 43°04′17″N 75°17′12″W	New Hartford	
66	Edward W. Stanley Recreation Center	Edward W. Stanley Recreation Center	February 17, 2010 (#10000029)	36 Kirkland Ave. 43°03′11″N 75°22′41″W	Clinton	New listing; refnum 10000029
67	Stanley Theater	Stanley Theater	August 13, 1976 (#76001255)	259 Genesee St. 43°05′56″N 75°14′10″W	Utica	
68	Tower Homestead and Masonic Temple	Tower Homestead and Masonic Temple	October 5, 1977 (#77000968)	210 Tower St. and Sanger St. 42°55′51″N 75°23′01″W	Waterville	
69	Union Station	Union Station	April 28, 1975 (#75001215)	Main St. between John and 1st Sts. 43°06′15″N 75°13′26″W	Utica	
70	US Post Office-Boonville	US Post Office-Boonville	November 17, 1988 (#88002457)	101 Main St. 43°29′03″N 75°20′09″W	Boonville	
71	U.S. Post Office, Court House and Custom House	U.S. Post Office, Court House and Custom House	September 17, 2015 (#15000609)	10 Broad St. 43°06′14″N 75°13′42″W	Utica	1929 building renamed after former area congressman is excellent example of Starved Classicism.
72	Uptown Theatre	Uptown Theatre	August 17, 2020 (#100005466)	2014 Genesee St. 43°05′11″N 75°15′44″W	Utica	
73	Utica Armory	Utica Armory	March 2, 1995 (#95000083)	1700 Parkway Blvd. E. 43°04′47″N 75°12′33″W	Utica	
74	Utica Daily Press Building	Utica Daily Press Building	June 10, 1993 (#93000501)	310-312 Main St. 43°06′14″N 75°13′28″W	Utica	
75	Utica Parks and Parkway Historic District	Utica Parks and Parkway Historic District	July 3, 2008 (#08000594)	Parkway and Pleasant St. 43°04′47″N 75°13′56″W	Utica	
76	Utica Public Library	Utica Public Library	October 29, 1982 (#82001210)	303 Genesee St. 43°05′49″N 75°14′21″W	Utica	
77	Utica State Hospital	Utica State Hospital	October 26, 1971 (#71000548)	1213 Court St. 43°06′18″N 75°15′13″W	Utica	
78	Utica Steam and Mohawk Valley Cotton Mill	Utica Steam and Mohawk Valley Cotton Mill	August 27, 2020 (#100005482)	600-800 State St. 43°06′10″N 75°14′19″W	Utica	
79	Vernon Center Green Historic District	Vernon Center Green Historic District	September 19, 1985 (#85002431)	Roughly bounded by Park St. 43°03′08″N 75°30′07″W	Vernon	
80	Vernon Methodist Church	Vernon Methodist Church	May 20, 1998 (#98000547)	Jct. of NY 5 and Sconondoa St. 43°04′43″N 75°32′29″W	Vernon	
81	Baron von Steuben Memorial Site	Baron von Steuben Memorial Site	August 21, 2009 (#09000635)	Starr Hill Road; 43°20′19″N 75°13′57″W	Remsen	
82	Sylvan Beach Union Chapel	Sylvan Beach Union Chapel	July 24, 2009 (#09000560)	805 Park Ave. 43°11′57″N 75°43′47″W	Sylvan Beach	
83	Tabernacle Baptist Church	Tabernacle Baptist Church	January 4, 2012 (#11001003)	8 Hopper St. 43°05′55″N 75°14′04″W	Utica	
84	Waterville Triangle Historic District	Waterville Triangle Historic District	April 4, 1978 (#78001888)	Stafford Ave., Main and White Sts. 42°55′50″N 75°22′43″W	Waterville	
85	Gen. John G. Weaver House	Gen. John G. Weaver House	December 7, 1989 (#89002093)	711 Herkimer Rd. 43°06′47″N 75°11′50″W	Utica	
86	Welsh Calvinistic Methodist Church	Welsh Calvinistic Methodist Church	January 13, 1988 (#87002275)	Prospect St. 43°19′34″N 75°11′02″W	Remsen	
87	Western Town Hall	Western Town Hall	November 7, 1995 (#95001277)	Main St. at the junction with Stokes-Westernville Rd. 43°18′29″N 75°22′52″W	Westernville	
88	Wethersfield Stone Schoolhouse	Wethersfield Stone Schoolhouse	September 7, 2005 (#05000991)	NY 365; 43°15′30″N 75°13′15″W	Trenton	
89	Whiffen–Ribyat Building	Whiffen–Ribyat Building	February 23, 2016 (#16000037)	327-331 Bleecker St. 43°06′03″N 75°13′33″W	Utica	1893 building for local meatpacking company later used by furniture retailer
90	Whitestown Town Hall	Whitestown Town Hall	November 26, 1973 (#73001231)	8 Park Ave. 43°07′16″N 75°17′30″W	Whitesboro	
91	Wright Settlement Cemetery	Wright Settlement Cemetery	May 8, 2012 (#12000256)	Cemetery Rd. 43°14′55″N 75°24′30″W	Rome	
92	Zion Church	Zion Church	August 21, 1997 (#97000950)	140 W. Liberty St. 43°12′46″N 75°27′29″W	Rome	

== See also ==
National Register of Historic Places listings in New York
