= Gansevoort =

Gansevoort may refer to any one of the following:

== People ==
- Guert Gansevoort (1812–1868), US Navy officer
- Harmen Harmense Gansevoort (ca. 1634–1709), early American settler, landowner and beer brewer
- Leonard Gansevoort (1751–1810), New York politician
- Peter Gansevoort (1749–1812), Continental Army officer in the Revolutionary War
- Peter Gansevoort (politician) (1788–1876), New York politician

== Places ==
- Gansevoort, New York, a hamlet in Saratoga County, New York
  - Gansevoort Mansion, a historic home in Gansevoort

=== In Manhattan, NYC ===
- Gansevoort Market, another name for the Meatpacking District, Manhattan, New York City
- Gansevoort Peninsula, another name for Thirteenth Avenue (Manhattan), NYC
- Gansevoort Street, a street in the Meatpacking District, Manhattan, NYC

== Other ==
- USS Gansevoort (DD-608), United States Navy destroyer in World War II

== See also ==
- Fort Gansevoort, a former United States Army fort in Manhattan, NYC
- Fort Gansevoort (gallery), an art gallery in Manhattan, NYC
- Gansevoort–Bellamy Historic District, a national historic district located at Rome in Oneida County, New York
