= Civic Arena =

Civic Arena may refer to:

In Italy

- Arena Civica, Milan

In Canada:

- Nanaimo Civic Arena, Nanaimo, British Columbia

In the United States:

- Civic Arena (Pittsburgh), Pittsburgh, Pennsylvania
- John F. Kennedy Civic Arena, Rome, New York
- Mentor Civic Arena, Mentor, Ohio
- Midland Civic Arena, Midland, Michigan
- Mobile Civic Center, Mobile, Alabama
- St. Joseph Civic Arena, Saint Joseph, Missouri
- Huntington Civic Arena, a former name of the Marshall Health Network Arena in Huntington, West Virginia
- Civic Arena, a former name of the SNHU Arena in Manchester, New Hampshire

== See also ==
- Pittsburgh Civic Arena (The Doors album)
