= Tabernacle Baptist Church (Utica, New York) =

Historic church in New York, United States

- U.S. National Register of Historic Places
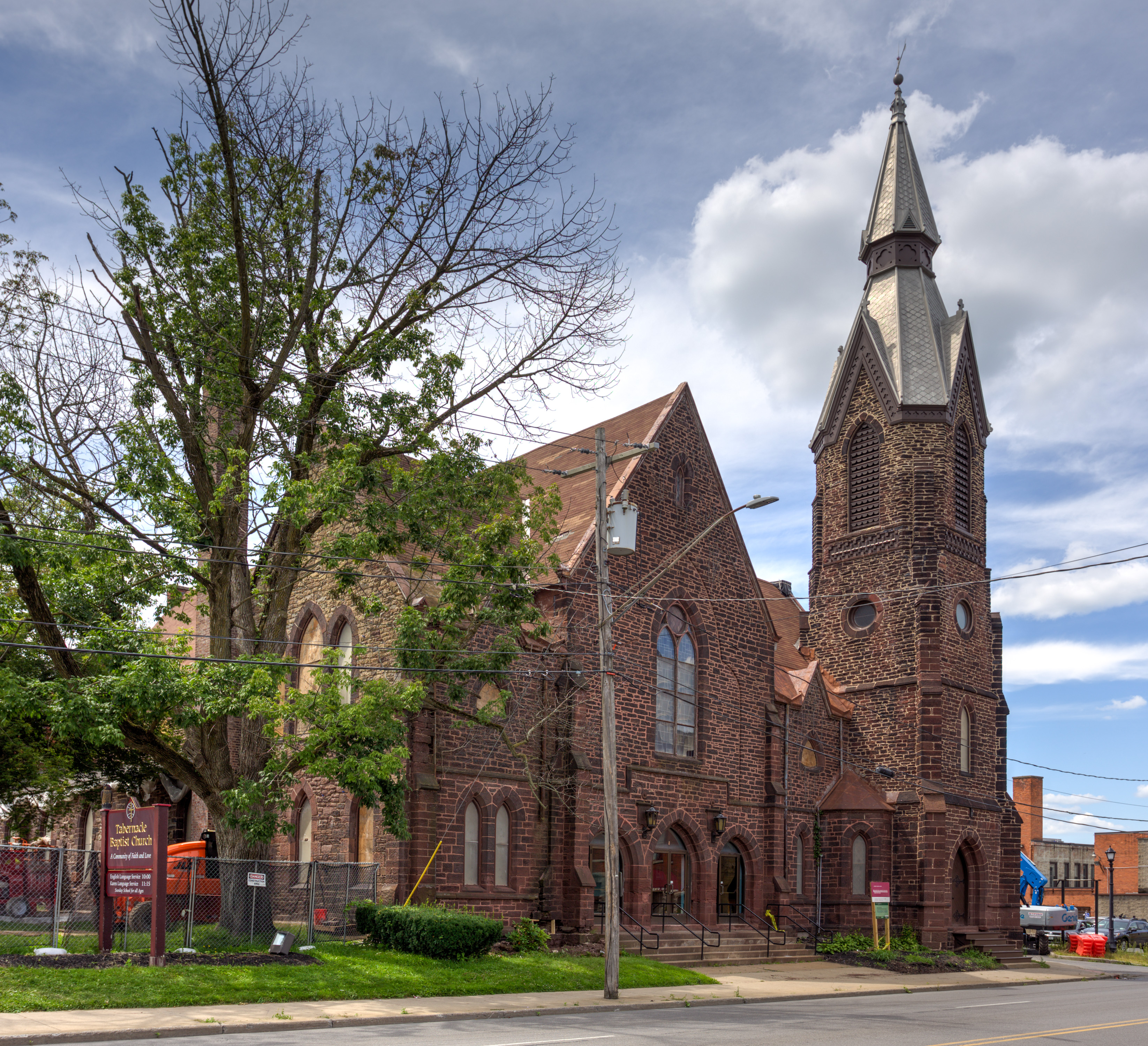
- Tabernacle Baptist Church, 2021

- Location within New York Location within the United States
- Location: 8 Hopper St., Utica, New York
- Coordinates: 43°05′57″N 75°14′3″W
- Area: Less than 1 acre (0.40 ha)
- Built: 1867, 1905
- Architect: Meacham, George F., Henry Lewis, Joseph James (church); Agne, Rusmere & Jemison, John Ulrich, Thomas McDermott (chapel)
- Architectural style: Gothic
- NRHP reference No.: 11001003
- Added to NRHP: January 4, 2012

Tabernacle Baptist Church is a historic Baptist church located at Utica in Oneida County, New York. It was built in 1867, and is a cruciform plan, Gothic Revival style, red sandstone church. It features a multi-staged corner tower with a square base and corner buttresses. Attached to the rear of the church is the brick Thorn Chapel and school added in 1905.

It was listed on the National Register of Historic Places in 2012.

== See also ==
- National Register of Historic Places listings in Oneida County, New York
