= Wright Settlement Cemetery =

Historic cemetery in New York, United States

- U.S. National Register of Historic Places
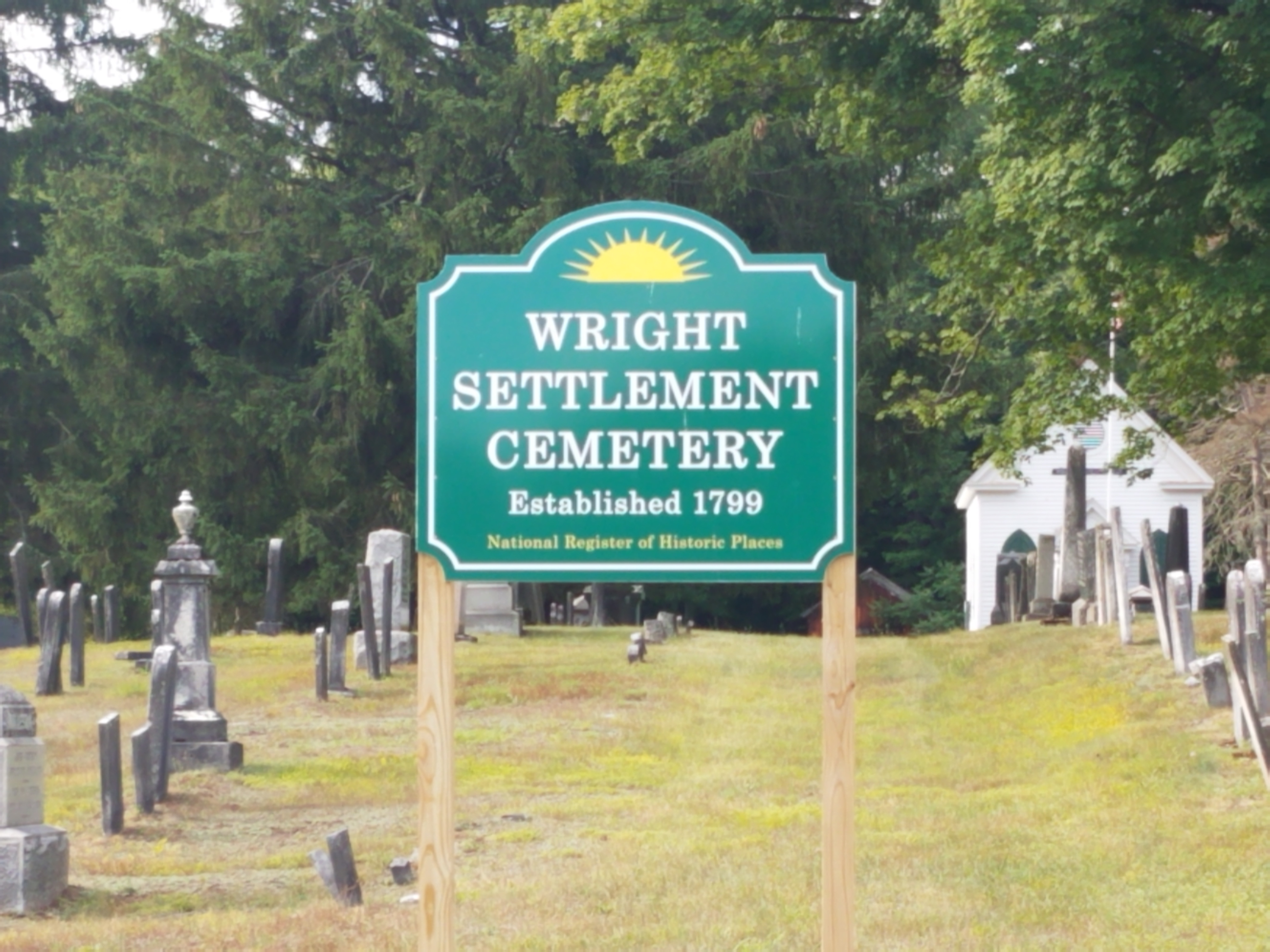

- Location within New York Location within the United States
- Location: 8 Hopper St., Wright Settlement, New York
- Coordinates: 43°14′55″N 75°24′30″W
- Area: 8.7 acres (3.5 ha)
- Built: c. 1806
- NRHP reference No.: 12000256
- Added to NRHP: May 8, 2012

Wright Settlement Cemetery is a historic cemetery located at Wright Settlement in Oneida County, New York. It was established about 1806, and includes about 3,000 gravestones. They range from simple, uncut, uninscribed stones to large, ornate family plots. The cemetery chapel was built about 1870, and is a 1 1/2-story, frame building on a cobblestone foundation. Also on the property is a contributing carriage house built about 1870.

It was listed on the National Register of Historic Places in 2012.
