= Rutger–Steuben Park Historic District =

Historic district in New York, United States

- U.S. National Register of Historic Places
- U.S. Historic district
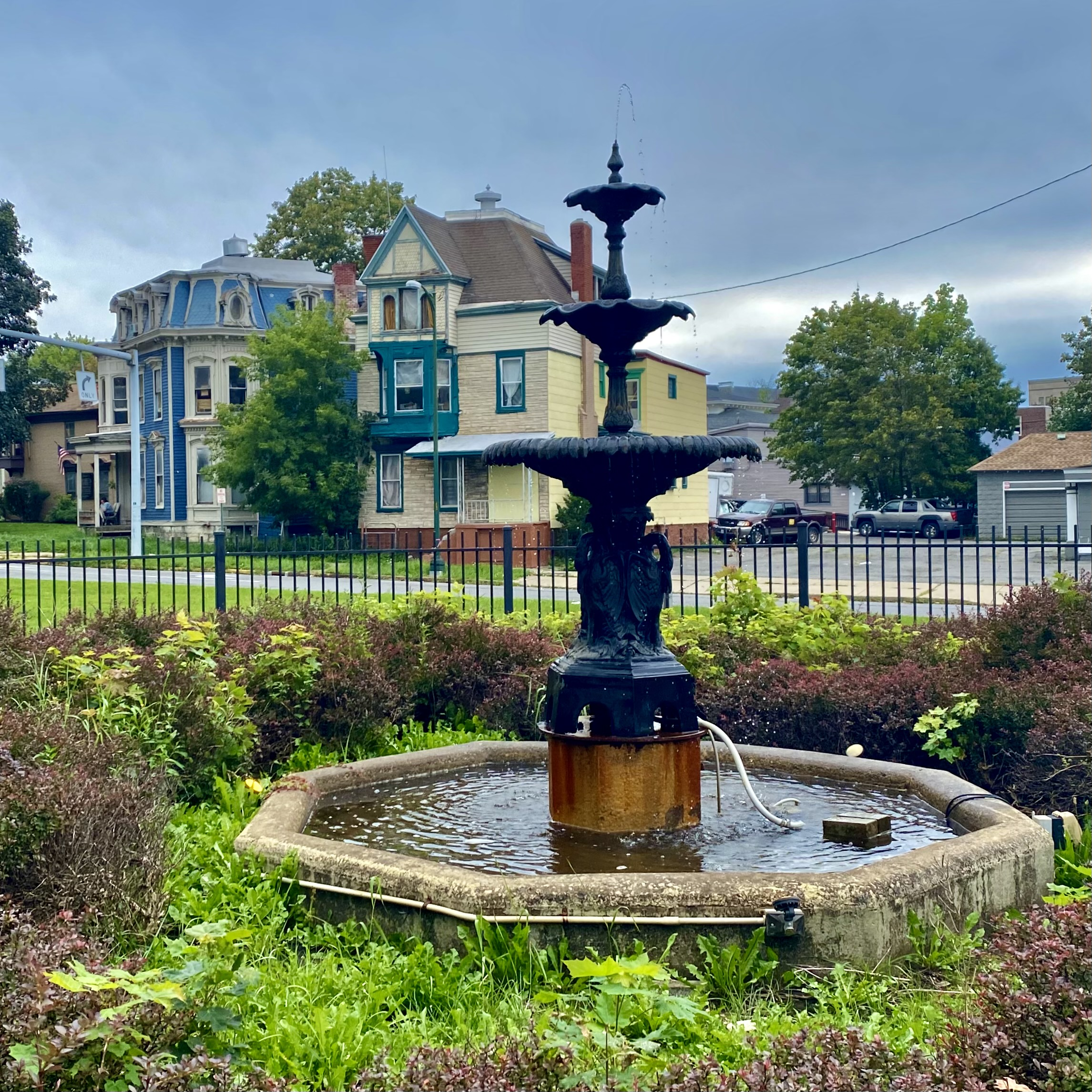
- Fountain at Steuben Park, August 2021

- Location within New York Location within the United States
- Location: Roughly bounded by Taylor and Howard Aves. including both sides of Rutger Ave. and Steuben Park, Utica, New York
- Coordinates: 43°05′48″N 75°13′45″W
- Area: 25 acres (10 ha)
- Architect: Alexander Jackson Davis; et al.
- Architectural style: Late Victorian, Italian Villa
- NRHP reference No.: 73001230
- Added to NRHP: September 19, 1973

Rutger–Steuben Park Historic District is a 25-acre (10 ha) historic district in the city of Utica in Oneida County, New York. The district includes 63 contributing buildings and contains numerous examples of late nineteenth century Italian Villa style residences. A group of five exceptional dwellings are grouped together in a private park, known as Rutger Park, at the center of the district. One of the dwellings on Rutger Park was designed by architect Alexander Jackson Davis. The Roscoe Conkling House is located at 3 Rutger Park and it was declared a National Historic Landmark in 1975.

It was listed on the National Register of Historic Places in 1973.

== See also ==
- List of Registered Historic Places in Oneida County, New York
