= John F. Kennedy Civic Arena =

Indoor arena in Rome, NY

Kennedy Arena
- Location in the United States Location in New York
- Interactive map of Kennedy Arena
- Address: 500 W. Embargo Street
- Location: Rome, New York, U.S.
- Coordinates: 43.2196°N 75.4636°W
- Elevation: 450 ft (135 m) AMSL
- Owner: City of Rome
- Operator: City of Rome
- Capacity: 1,200
- Surface: 200 ft × 85 ft (61 m × 26 m) (ice hockey)

Construction
- Groundbreaking: 1963
- Opened: 1964; 62 years ago

Tenants
- Copper City Chiefs (NEHL; 2007–2008); Rome Frenzy (FHL; 2010–2011); Utica Yeti (IBLA; 2022-present)

The John F. Kennedy Civic Arena (also known as Kennedy Arena) is an indoor ice hockey arena in the northeastern United States, located in Rome, New York. Home to the Copper City Chiefs of the North East Hockey League during the league's failed 2007–2008 season, the arena would have been home to the Eastern Professional Hockey League franchise, but the team folded before the season. During the 2010–2011 season, it was home to the Rome Frenzy of the Federal Hockey League. It is now home of the current Copper City Chiefs of the American Premier Hockey League which will begin play in October 2026.

One of the city's most popular venues, it was originally constructed in 1963, opened in 1964, and renovated in 2008. The 1,200-seat facility hosts numerous figure skating and ice hockey events, as well as learn-to-skate programs for youths; it is home ice for the Rome Free Academy varsity hockey team.

The arena is a regional facility, used primarily for ice hockey and figure skating from October through March. The primary users are the Ford Stanwix Hockey Association (non-profit youth hockey organization), Rome Free Academy, Rome Catholic High School, a local figure skating club, various local groups, and the general public.

The arena is located at 500 West Embargo Street, co-located with the municipal pool, a community facility open from June through early September. It includes a standard-size recreational swimming pool, two water play slides, and a bathhouse with restrooms, meeting the recreational swimming needs of west Rome.

The arena and pool are served by a large parking lot off of Jay and Embargo Streets with space for more than 150 vehicles. A smaller lot on the arena's west side is used primarily by employees and hockey officials.

== Copper City Chiefs ==
The Copper City Chiefs semi-professional hockey team was established in 1963 and folded at the end of the 1988 season. The team played in the Kennedy Arena when it opened in 1964. During the 1960s they played in a league of cities in the state of New York. In the 1970s they played in a league of teams from New England states and New York. In the 1980s, the team played against Senior A, Senior B, and Intermediate Level teams from Ontario, Canada.

The Rome Copper City Chiefs were organized in 1963 under their original name of the Rome Knights, an unchartered recreational organization which was begun to provide athletic recreation in the form of ice hockey to adults who had played minor professional or college ice hockey.

For six years, until 1971, the Knights played ice hockey by invitation; that is, inviting teams from the surrounding area to Rome's John F. Kennedy Arena. The Knights were not part of any formal league at this time, nor were they affiliated with a National Hockey League (NHL) or professional hockey team. However, during their existence many of their rostered players had some minor professional experience. The Knights engaged in strictly invitational hockey games, usually paying expenses of the opposing team so they would play in Rome. This was gradually expanded over the years to include teams from as far away as Massachusetts, New Jersey, Pennsylvania and the Canadian province of Ontario.

In the middle 1960s, interest in the Knights ice hockey team increased, primarily as an overflow from the Clinton Comets of the Eastern Hockey League, a professional farm team for the New York Rangers of the NHL. The presence of former Clinton Comets, along with the Knights' physical style of play, stimulated the general population's interest in attending Rome Knights hockey games.

In 1971 the Rome Knights changed their name to the Copper City Chiefs. Rome is referred to as the Copper City, after the Revere Manufacturing Plant that once produced copperware in the city through the 1970s.

The Rome Copper City Chiefs continued to play invitational games and increased their following in and around central New York. In 1971 the Clinton Comets folded. This brought more professional players to the Chiefs and added to the increased attendance at their games. A new general manager took control of the team and instituted a publicity campaign to further increase game attendance and provide further incentives for local business sponsorship.

During the 1972–1973 season, the Chiefs' general manager met with managers of opposing teams, and they decided to form the Northeastern United States Hockey League. This was composed of teams from upstate New York, parts of Massachusetts, and northern New Jersey. League play, coupled with increased advertising and publicity, helped increase attendance, but also required the Chiefs to play in more away games. As added incentive for fans to attend their games, schedules of play were arranged for the 1973-1974 season to give maximum home play to teams that had a traditional adversary relationship. The league was successful and attendance between 1973 and 1975 increased to an overall average of 900 per game. End-of-season league play-offs were standing room only. But involvement in the league, which was never formalized enough to support and enforce the schedules (i.e., no penalty for missed games, forfeitures), also created additional expenses for all the teams. The league folded as teams withdrew due to financial hardships.

During their 25 years of existence, supporter participation fluctuated, peaking during 1973-1975. Those seasons showed average game attendances of approximately 900. After the 1975 season, participation gradually declined, culminating in the 1984-1985 season's average attendance of 250.

On June 16, 2026, Milliken Sports Group announced the semi-pro hockey was returning to the JFK Arena in the American Premier Hockey League. On June 10, 2026 the team announced after having a "Name The Team Contest" that the team name would be the Copper City Chiefs. The team will begin play in October 2026.

== Renovations ==
After an almost $3.5 million renovation, Kennedy Arena was officially dedicated on January 30, 2009.

The renovation raised the seating capacity from 800 to 1,200. Other improvements included a longer ice rink; new boards, glass, and safety net; new bleachers across the back end of the arena; four new locker rooms; upgrades to locker rooms; and an enhanced heating and lighting system. Improvements were also made to the warming room and concession area, to allow for more and better off-season use of the facility, including usage by teens and seniors.

The shell of the building remains relatively unchanged from its original construction in 1963.
