= Rome Arsenal =

Historic building in New York, United States

- Arsenal House
- U.S. National Register of Historic Places
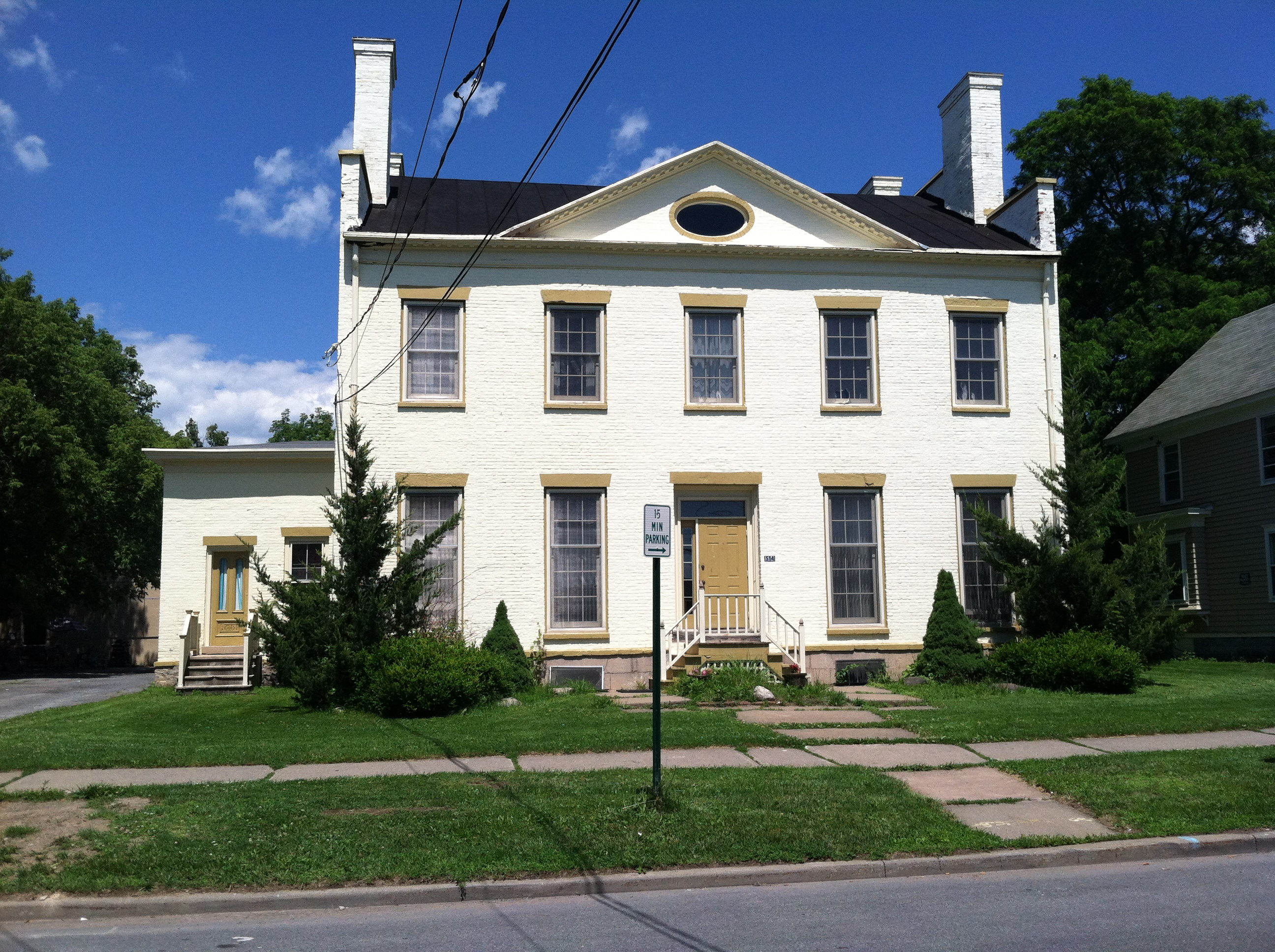

- Location within New York Location within the United States
- Location: 514 W. Dominick St., Rome, New York
- Coordinates: 43°12′56″N 75°28′4″W
- Area: 0 acres (0 ha)
- Built: 1813
- Architectural style: Federal, Dutch Federalist
- NRHP reference No.: 74001284
- Added to NRHP: July 18, 1974

The Rome Arsenal was a 3 acres (12,000 m^{2}) fortification complex near Rome, New York. It was built in 1814, and used until 1873.

Rome Arsenal included barracks, arsenal, magazine, workshops, and other buildings, built to support American forces waging the War of 1812. Major James Dalleba of Ordnance Department of United States Army supervised construction.

Arsenal House, also known as Commandant's House, is a historic home located at Rome in Oneida County, New York. It is a 2 1/2-story, brick structure on a stone foundation, 30 by 36 feet (9.1 by 11.0 m), in the Federal style. At a later date, 1-story wings were added plus front and rear porches. It was listed on the National Register of Historic Places in 1974.
