= Globe Woolen Company Mills =

- U.S. National Register of Historic Places
- U.S. Historic district
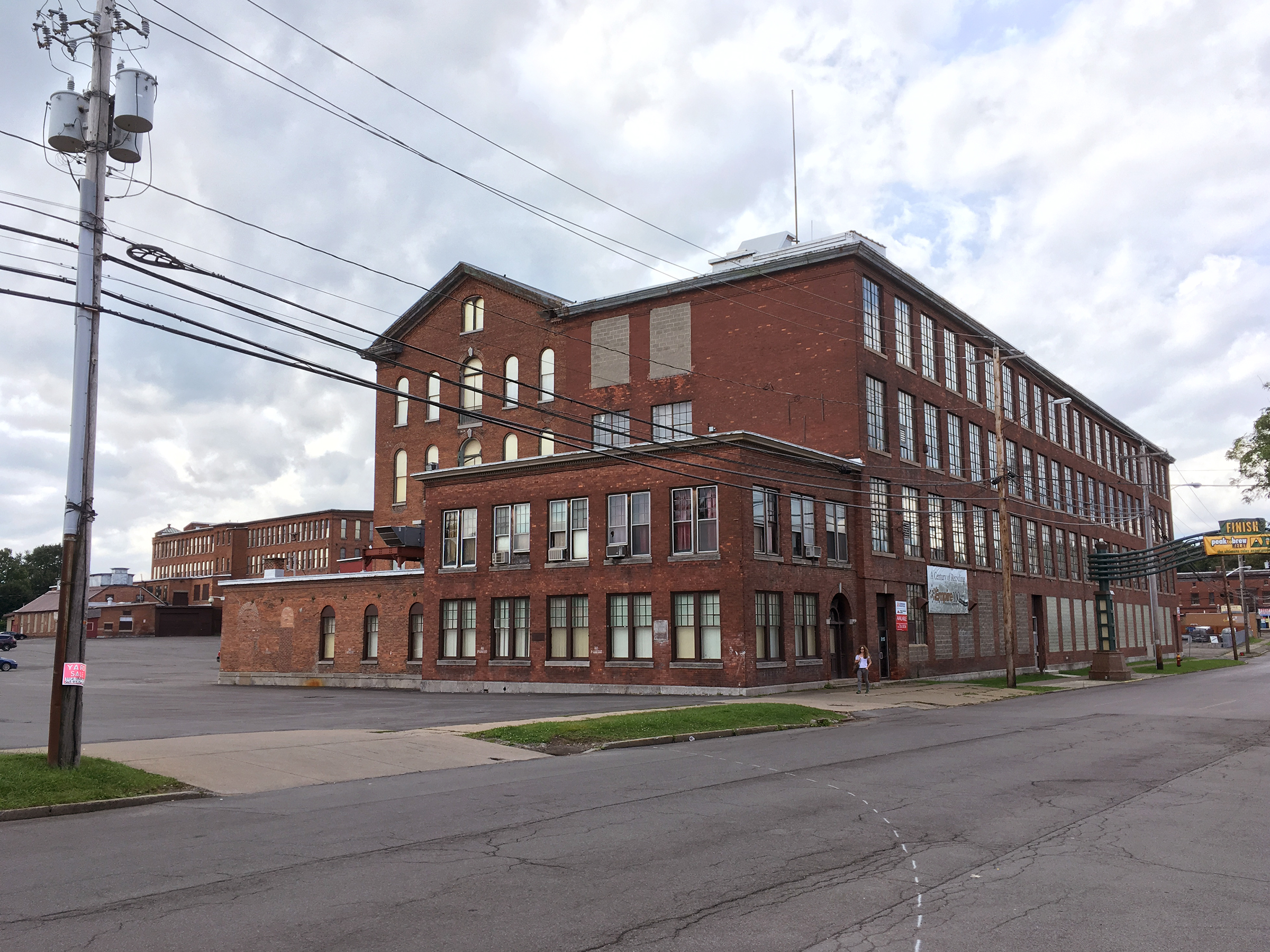
- Globe Woolen Company Mills, August 2017

- Location within New York Location within the United States
- Location: 805, 809, 811-827 Court & 933 Stark Sts., Utica, New York
- Coordinates: 43°06′09″N 75°14′53″W
- Area: 6.13 acres (2.48 ha)
- Built: 1872-1873, 1886; 1916; 1930; 1953
- Architect: Azel J. Lathrop
- Architectural style: Italianate
- NRHP reference No.: 15000823
- Added to NRHP: January 5, 2016

Globe Woolen Company Mills is a historic woolen mill complex and national historic district located at Utica, Oneida County, New York. It encompasses four contributing components of an intact mill complex: the Woolen Mill Grouping (1872-1873); Storehouse #2 (1872-1873); Storehouse #3 (1872-1873); and the Worsted Mill Grouping (1886). They include four-story mill buildings, attached company office, and two remaining store houses. The buildings are constructed of red brick and have Italianate style design elements. After the mill closed in the 1950s, the buildings were reused for college classrooms and later as offices.

It was added to the National Register of Historic Places in 2016.
