= New York Mills, New York =

- Village
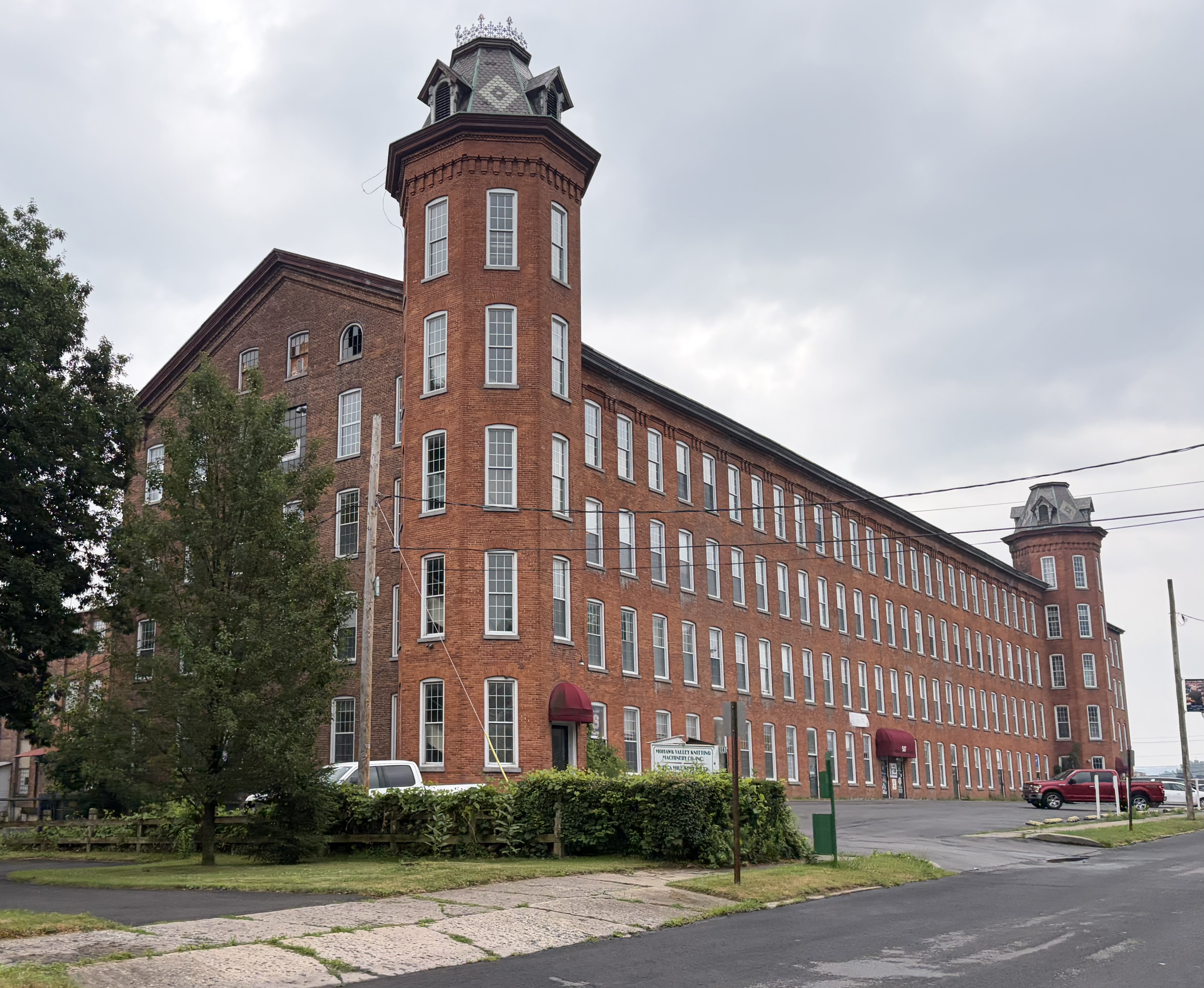
- The former Mill #3 in New York Mills, now a retail and office center

- Seal

- Location in Oneida County and the state of New York.
- Coordinates: 43°6′9″N 75°17′32″W
- Country: United States
- State: New York
- County: Oneida
- First settled: 1808; 218 years ago
- Incorporated as a village: March 29, 1922; 104 years ago

Government
  - Mayor: Ernie Talerico

Area
  - Total: 1.18 sq mi (3.06 km^{2})
  - Land: 1.18 sq mi (3.06 km^{2})
  - Water: 0 sq mi (0.00 km^{2})
- Elevation: 466 ft (142 m)

Population (2020)
  - Total: 3,244
  - Density: 2,749.9/sq mi (1,061.73/km^{2})
- Time zone: UTC-5 (Eastern (EST))
  - Summer (DST): UTC-4 (EDT)
- ZIP Codes: 13417 (New York Mills); 13495 (Yorkville)
- Area code: 315
- FIPS code: 36-51011
- GNIS feature ID: 0958479
- Website: www.nymills.com

New York Mills is a village in Oneida County, New York, United States. As of the 2020 census, New York Mills had a population of 3,244.

The village of New York Mills is situated partly within the town of Whitestown and partly within the town of New Hartford. It serves as a western suburb of the city of Utica. It is part of the New York Mills Union Free School District.

== History ==
James S. Pula and Eugene E. Dziedzic provide a detailed history on the village in their book New York Mills (Images of America):

New York Mills, named for the textile factories that were once the backbone of the surrounding villages economy, ranked among the foremost producers of quality fabrics in the country. Originally a wilderness area just south of the Mohawk River, the community began with a few scattered homes after the establishment of a small textile mill in 1808. Nourished by a growing economy, the village attracted a mosaic of Welsh and French-Canadian workers in the 19th century, followed by Poles, Syro-Lebanese, and Italians in the early 20th century. A hotbed of abolitionism in the antebellum years, it sent high percentages of its residents off to the Civil War, World War I, and World War II. In 1912 and 1916, its Polish residents founded a union and led textile strikes that were considered the most successful in the nation at that time. With the eventual closing of the mills in the 1950s, residents found employment in the surrounding area as the village evolved into a stable and prosperous suburban community.

The first mill was established in 1808 by Benjamin Stuart Walcott. In 1847, Samuel Campbell became a member of what was by then called the New York Mills corporation. The Campbell and Walcott families would co-own the corporation for the rest of the 19th century. An 1896 account of New York Mills described it as a "factory village".

In 1909, the mills of the New York Mills Corporation went into foreclosure and were purchased by the Augustus D. Juilliard Company. The Juilliard Company sold the mills again in 1953.

As early as 1878, a high percentage of immigrants became an integral part of the village's population.

On April 5, 1912, martial law was proclaimed to stop rioting textile strikers in New York Mills, Yorkville, and Utica.

In 2007, village police chief Bradley Frankland retired after pointing a taser at a village clerk. Since 2020, the chief has been his son, Robert Frankland.

The Middle Mill Historic District was listed on the National Register of Historic Places in 1976.

== Notable people ==
- Lewis A. Brigham, represented New Jersey's 7th congressional district in the United States House of Representatives from 1879 to 1881
- Robin Curtis, actress
- Ed Furgol, winner of the 1954 U.S. Open at Baltusrol, champion golfer who overcame an unbending left arm from a broken elbow at age 12
- Marty Furgol, PGA golfer (unrelated to Ed Furgol)
- Charles Melville Moss (1853 - 1926), classicist at the University of Illinois and author of A First Greek Reader, with Notes and Vocabulary (1887)
- Charles Doolittle Walcott, paleontologist
- Frederic C. Walcott, United States Senator representing Connecticut from 1929 to 1935
- Joe Bonamassa, American blues rock guitarist, singer and songwriter

== Geography ==
New York Mills is located at 43°06′09″N 75°17′32″W.

According to the United States Census Bureau, the village has a total area of 1.1 square miles (2.8 km^{2}), all of it land.

The village is south of the Mohawk River. Some of the surrounding towns and cities near New York Mills include Whitesboro, Utica, Yorkville, and New Hartford.

== Demographics ==
Historical population
Census	Pop.	Note	%±
1870	1,264		—
1880	1,833		45.0%
1890	2,552		39.2%
1930	4,006		—
1940	3,628		−9.4%
1950	3,366		−7.2%
1960	3,788		12.5%
1970	3,805		0.4%
1980	3,549		−6.7%
1990	3,534		−0.4%
2000	3,191		−9.7%
2010	3,327		4.3%
2020	3,244		−2.5%
U.S. Decennial Census

=== 2020 census ===
As of the 2020 census, New York Mills had a population of 3,244. The median age was 43.1 years. 17.1% of residents were under the age of 18 and 22.3% of residents were 65 years of age or older. For every 100 females, there were 89.5 males, and for every 100 females age 18 and over, there were 86.7 males age 18 and over.

100.0% of residents lived in urban areas, while 0.0% lived in rural areas.

There were 1,709 households in New York Mills, of which 22.2% had children under the age of 18 living in them. Of all households, 28.0% were married-couple households, 25.3% were households with a male householder and no spouse or partner present, and 37.3% were households with a female householder and no spouse or partner present. About 45.2% of all households were made up of individuals and 20.4% had someone living alone who was 65 years of age or older.

There were 1,913 housing units, of which 10.7% were vacant. The homeowner vacancy rate was 0.7% and the rental vacancy rate was 7.5%.

Racial composition as of the 2020 census
Race	Number	Percent
White	2,915	89.9%
Black or African American	101	3.1%
American Indian and Alaska Native	4	0.1%
Asian	36	1.1%
Native Hawaiian and Other Pacific Islander	1	0.0%
Some other race	48	1.5%
Two or more races	139	4.3%
Hispanic or Latino (of any race)	140	4.3%

=== 2000 census ===
As of the census of 2000, there were 3,191 people, 1,550 households, and 806 families residing in the village. The population density was 2,807.6 inhabitants per square mile (1,084.0/km^{2}). There were 1,633 housing units at an average density of 1,436.8 per square mile (554.8/km^{2}). The racial makeup of the village was 98.21% White, 0.38% African American, 0.06% Native American, 0.34% Asian, 0.03% Pacific Islander, 0.25% from other races, and 0.72% from two or more races. Hispanic or Latino of any race were 1.07% of the population.

There were 1,550 households, out of which 21.9% had children under the age of 18 living with them, 37.9% were married couples living together, 10.5% had a female householder with no husband present, and 48.0% were non-families. 41.7% of all households were made up of individuals, and 21.4% had someone living alone who was 65 years of age or older. The average household size was 2.06 and the average family size was 2.84.

In the village, the population was spread out, with 18.6% under the age of 18, 7.9% from 18 to 24, 28.1% from 25 to 44, 21.3% from 45 to 64, and 24.0% who were 65 years of age or older. The median age was 42 years. For every 100 females, there were 81.7 males. For every 100 females age 18 and over, there were 78.3 males.

The median income for a household in the village was $30,993, and the median income for a family was $39,779. Males had a median income of $30,000 versus $29,844 for females. The per capita income for the village was $19,793. About 8.6% of families and 10.7% of the population were below the poverty line, including 17.9% of those under age 18 and 6.7% of those age 65 or over.
