= Rome Elks Lodge No. 96 =

- U.S. National Register of Historic Places
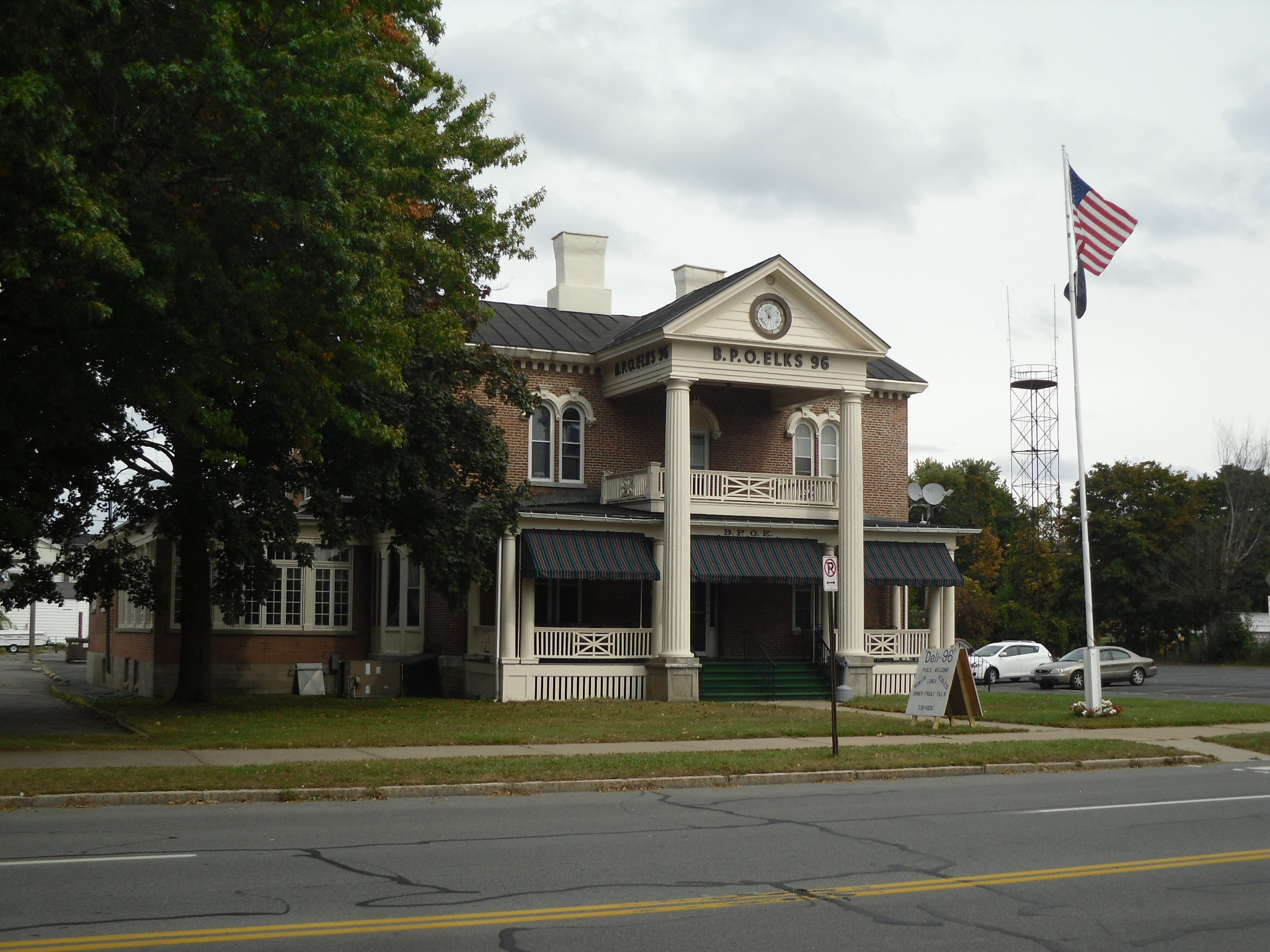
- Rome Elks Lodge No. 96, September 2010

- Location within New York Location within the United States
- Interactive map showing the location of Rome Elks Lodge No. 96
- Location: 126 W. Liberty St., Rome, New York
- Coordinates: 43°12′44″N 75°27′33″W
- Area: Less than 1 acre (0.40 ha)
- Built: c. 1848, 1926, 1932
- Built by: Soper, Hiram, D.B. Prince
- Architect: Rice & Atkinson
- Architectural style: Italianate, Classical Revival
- NRHP reference No.: 13000359
- Added to NRHP: June 5, 2013

Rome Elks Lodge No. 96, also known as the Benjamin Leonard House, is a historic Elk's lodge located at Rome in Oneida County, New York. It consists of an asymmetrical, early Italianate style brick main section (c. 1848), with a large rectangular rear addition (1932), and a sun porch and projecting Classical Revival style portico (1926). The portico features two Doric order fluted columns. It was originally built as a dwelling, but rehabilitated in 1926 for use as an Elk's Lodge.

It was listed on the National Register of Historic Places in 2013.
