= First Methodist Episcopal Church of Rome =

Historic church in New York, United States

- U.S. National Register of Historic Places
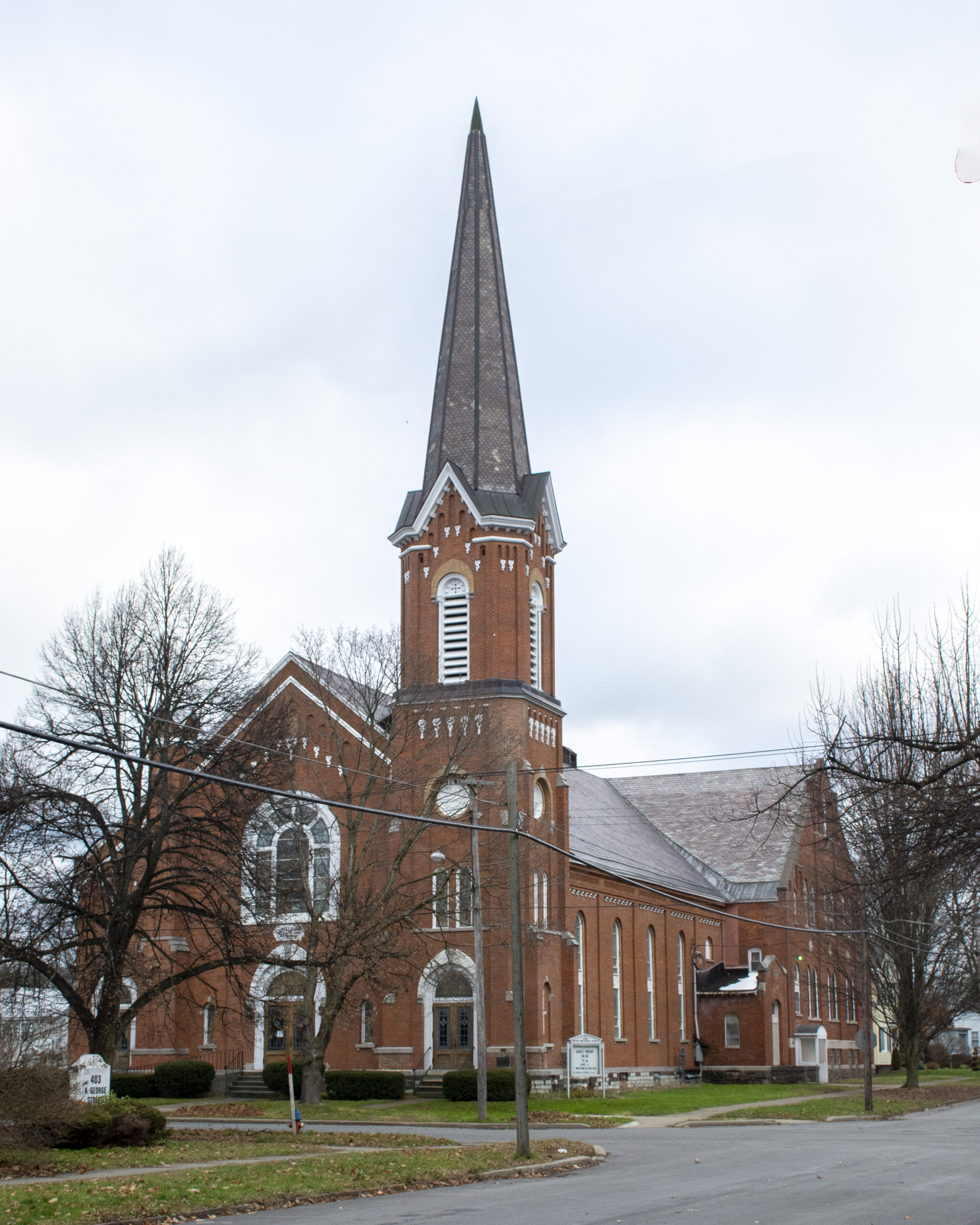

- Location within New York Location within the United States
- Location: 400 N. George St. Rome, New York
- Coordinates: 43°12′58.86″N 75°27′30.62″W
- Area: 0.6 acres (0.24 ha)
- Built: 1868
- NRHP reference No.: 09001286
- Added to NRHP: January 29, 2010

First Methodist Episcopal Church of Rome is a historic Methodist Episcopal church building located at Rome in Oneida County, New York. It includes the original brick and stone church building, completed in 1868, and the Ninde Memorial Chapel, added in 1910–1911. The church is a 2-story, three-bay-wide building with a spire and bell tower. It has a slate-covered gable roof. The chapel is a 2 1/2-story, four-bay-wide, red brick building on a cut stone foundation.

It was listed on the National Register of Historic Places in 2010.
