= Roscoe Conkling House =

Historic house in New York, United States

- U.S. National Register of Historic Places
- U.S. National Historic Landmark
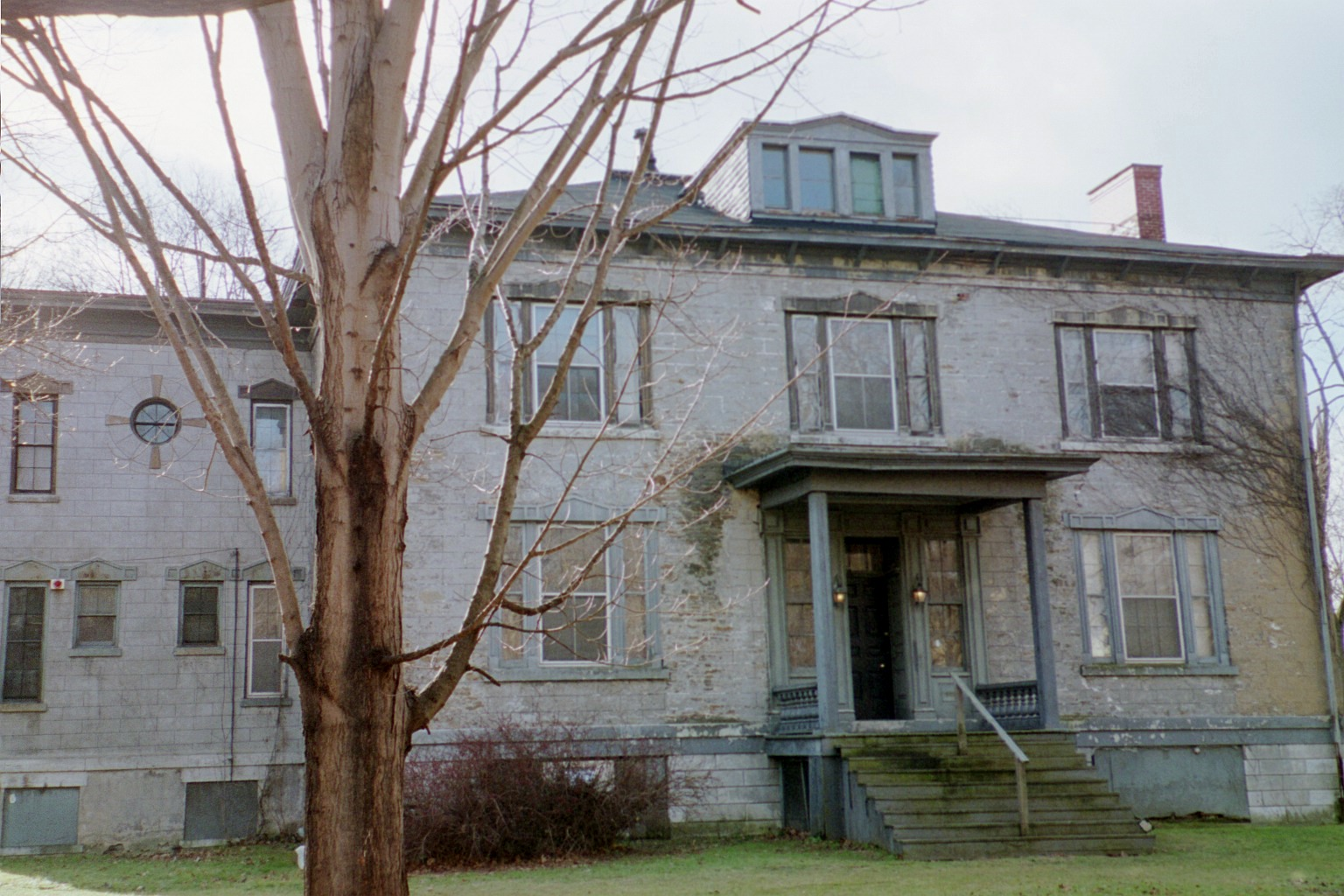
- Roscoe Conkling House, January 2008

- Location within New York Location within the United States
- Location: 3 Rutger Park, Utica, New York, U.S.
- Coordinates: 43°5′45.99″N 75°13′47.02″W
- Built: 1829–1830
- Architect: Philip Hooker
- Architectural style: Greek Revival
- NRHP reference No.: 75001214

Significant dates
- Added to NRHP: May 15, 1975
- Designated NHL: May 15, 1975

The Roscoe Conkling House is a historic house at 3 Rutger Park in Utica, New York, United States. A National Historic Landmark, it was the home of Roscoe Conkling (1829–1888), a powerful and controversial politician.

== Conkling ==
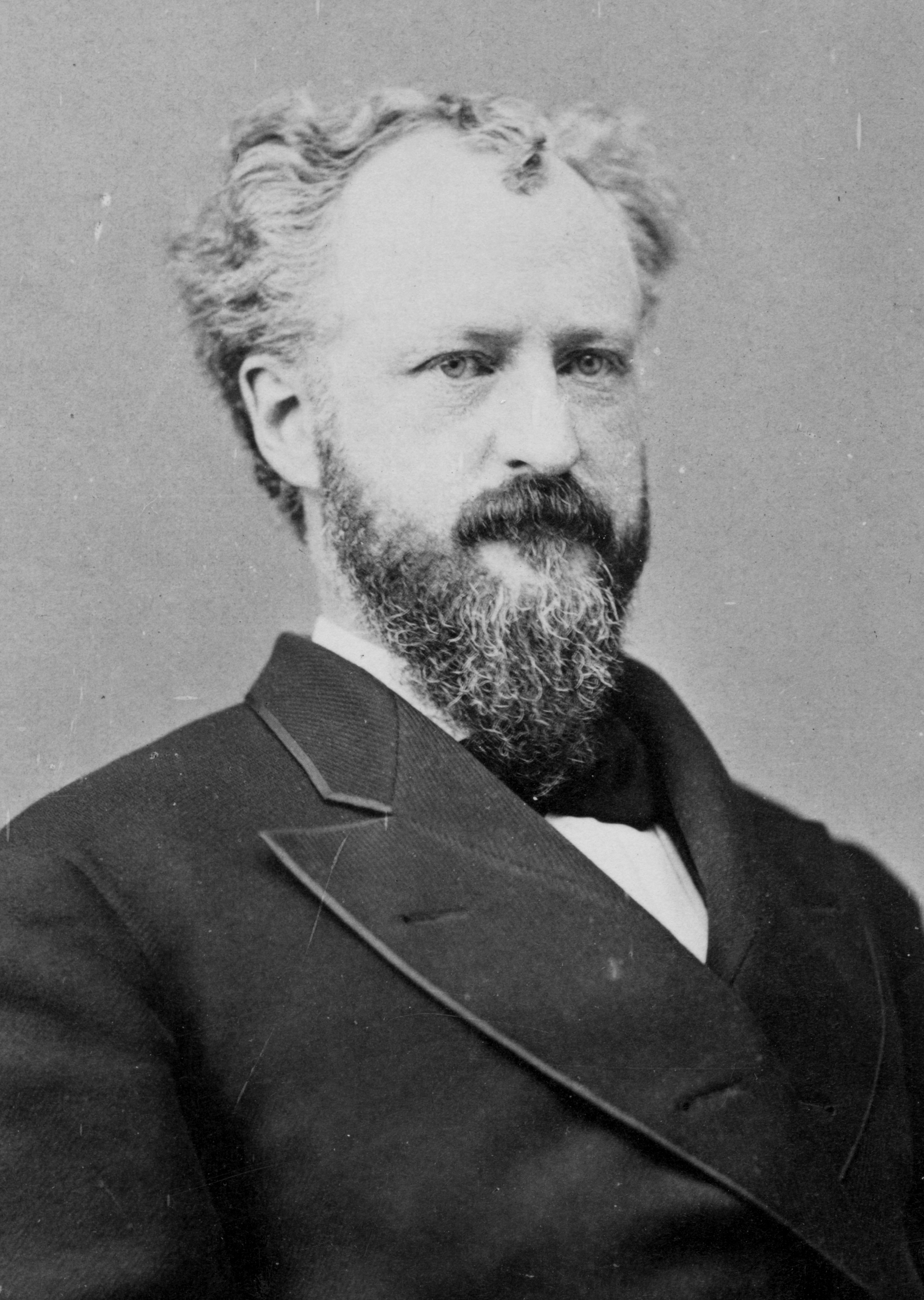
Conkling

Roscoe Conkling's political career began as mayor of Utica in 1858, and rose through terms as U.S. Congressman 1859-1863 and 1865–1867. Finally he was U.S. Senator from New York 1868–1881. In 1870 he became boss of New York's Republican political machine. Conkling was mentor to Chester A. Arthur, and was instrumental in getting him appointed collector of the port of New York in 1871. In 1872 Conkling was offered the position of Chief Justice of the U.S. Supreme Court by Grant, but he refused.

When Rutherford B. Hayes became president in 1877, Conkling violently opposed him on the issue of civil service reform. In 1880, Conkling, as part of the "Stalwart" faction of the Republican Party, supported Grant's bid for a third term. The split in the Republican Party was so divisive that the 1880 Republican National Convention took 36 ballots to nominate James A. Garfield. The fact that Chester Arthur then accepted the nomination for vice president infuriated Conkling. In May 1881, Conkling and the other U.S. Senator from New York resigned from the Senate in protest of Garfield's political appointments. They expected to be immediately re-elected to the Senate by the New York State legislature, but this did not happen. Instead, they returned to New York to campaign for re-election. In the highly charged atmosphere while the New York legislature was deadlocked on this issue, crazed Stalwart supporter Charles J. Guiteau assassinated President Garfield. The resulting public outcry effectively ended Conkling's political career. Although Chester Arthur became president, he kept Conkling at a safe political distance. Arthur did offer him a seat on the U.S. Supreme Court in 1882, but again Conkling refused.

== The House ==
The Roscoe Conkling House was designed by Philip Hooker in the Greek Revival style. It was begun between 1820 and 1824, and completed in 1830 by the Miller family. The house may also be known as the Miller-Conkling-Kernan House. Roscoe Conkling bought the house in 1863 and lived there until his death in 1888. The hip roofed brick house is covered with grey stucco scored to look like rock. The house was purchased from Conkling's family in 1894 by Nicholas Kernan. After this time, the two story East (left) wing was added, as well as the current porch, dormer and chimney tops.

The house was declared a National Historic Landmark in 1975. The house and its park are part of the Rutger-Steuben Park Historic District. In 2005, the house was listed for sale. It could be bought separately or together with another house at 1 Rutger Park that was designed by Alexander Jackson Davis.

As of 2010, both the Conkling House (3 Rutger Park) and 1 Rutger Park are owned by the Landmarks Society of Greater Utica, "which is slowly renovating the buildings with the goal of turning them into mansion-museums."

Julia Seymour Conkling, wife of Senator Roscoe Conkling, served as the first Chapter Regent of the Oneida Chapter, Daughters of the American Revolution, which was formed on June 19, 1893. The first meeting took place in Julia’s home at 3 Rutger Park in Utica, New York.
