= Vernon Methodist Church =

Historic church in New York, United States

- U.S. National Register of Historic Places
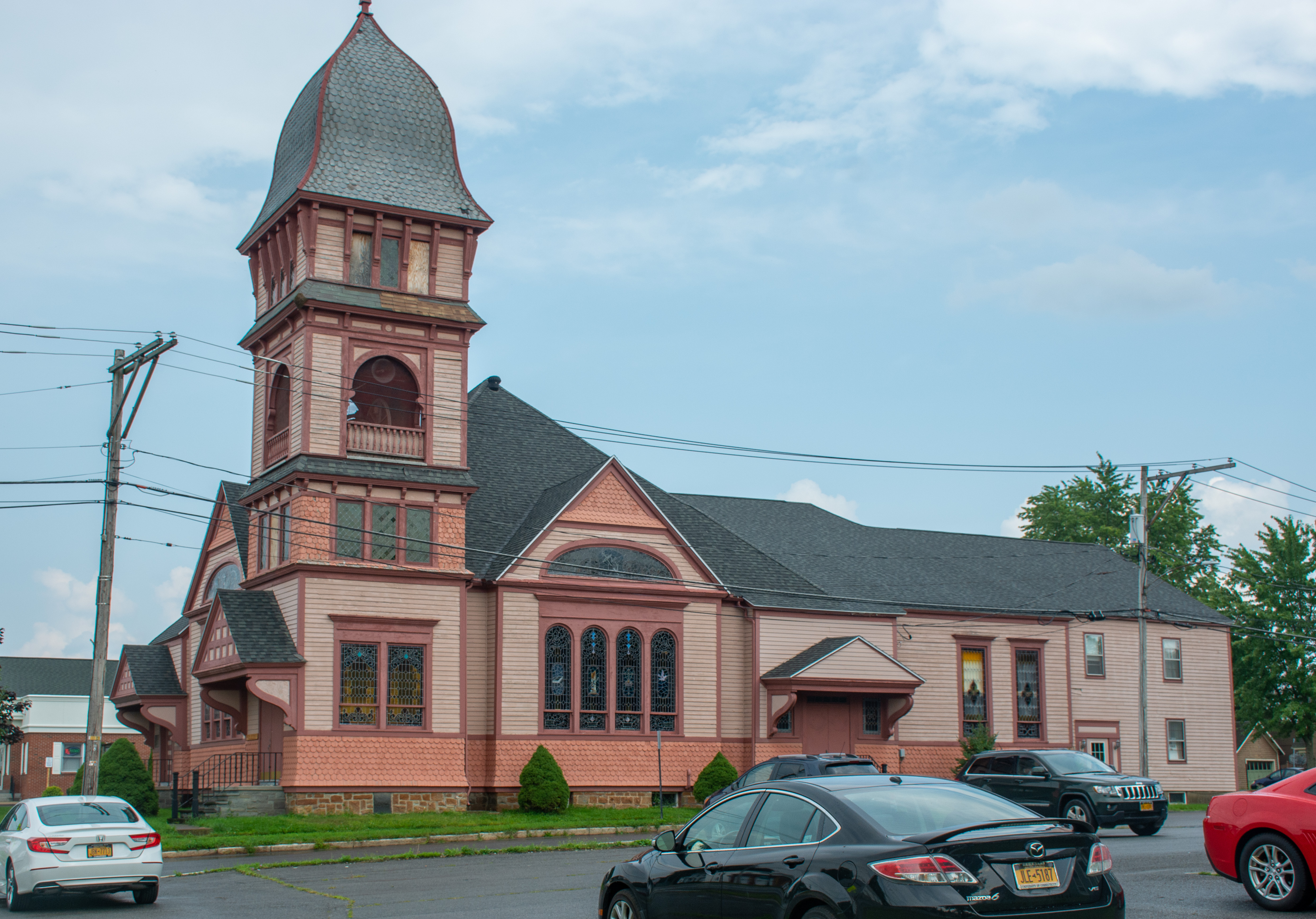

- Location within New York Location within the United States
- Location: Jct. of NY 5 and Sconondoa St., Vernon, New York
- Coordinates: 43°4′43″N 75°32′29″W
- Area: 0.3 acres (0.12 ha)
- Built: 1892
- Architect: Hubbard, Melvin H.
- Architectural style: Queen Anne
- NRHP reference No.: 98000547
- Added to NRHP: May 20, 1998

Vernon Methodist Church is a historic Methodist church at the junction of NY 5 and Sconondoa Street in Vernon, Oneida County, New York. It was built in 1892 and is a rectangular structure consisting of a square sanctuary (54 feet by 54 feet) with projecting, gable roofed wall bays on three sides and an attached parish hall wing. It features a massive engaged entrance/bell tower which incorporates an open belfry with balustrade and a large bellcast roof with slate shingles.

It was listed on the National Register of Historic Places in 1998.
