= Otter Lake Community Church =

Historic church in New York, United States

- U.S. National Register of Historic Places
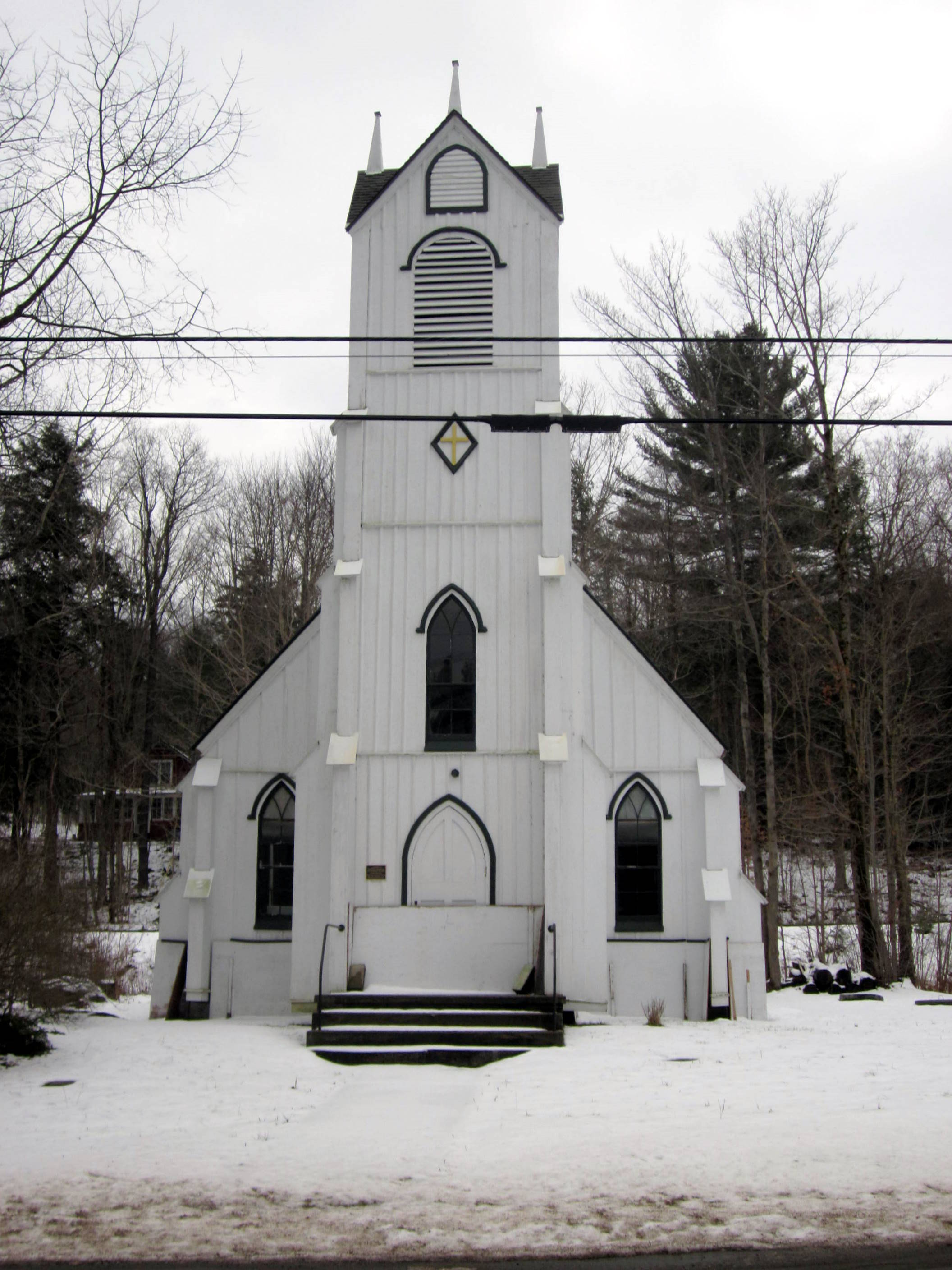
- Otter Lake Community Church, January 2012

- Location within New York Location within the United States
- Location: NY 28, Otter Lake, New York
- Coordinates: 43°35′30″N 75°6′46″W
- Area: less than one acre
- Built: 1861
- Architectural style: Gothic Revival, Bungalow/Craftsman
- NRHP reference No.: 04000704
- Added to NRHP: July 9, 2004

The Otter Lake Community Church, built in 1861 in Hawkinsville, New York, is now located on the east side of Route 28 in Otter Lake, Oneida County, New York. It was moved to Otter Lake in 1921 and has been listed on the National Register of Historic Places since 2004.

== History ==
The church was built to a design inspired by the work of Richard Upjohn in 1859–61 for a German Lutheran congregation in Hawkinsville. The Lutheran congregation abandoned the building in 1891, and the church was acquired and moved to Otter Lake to serve as a non-denominational seasonal summer chapel in 1921.

== Architecture ==
This Gothic Revival-style church has the following architectural features: emphasis on verticality; board and batten siding; steeply pitched roof; and arched windows and door. The interior of the church contains the original pews, altar, and balcony. It is a rectangular, gable roofed Carpenter Gothic structure with board-and-batten siding. It features a massive four stage, square tower engaged in the front facade.
