= Millar-Wheeler House =

Historic house in New York, United States

- U.S. National Register of Historic Places
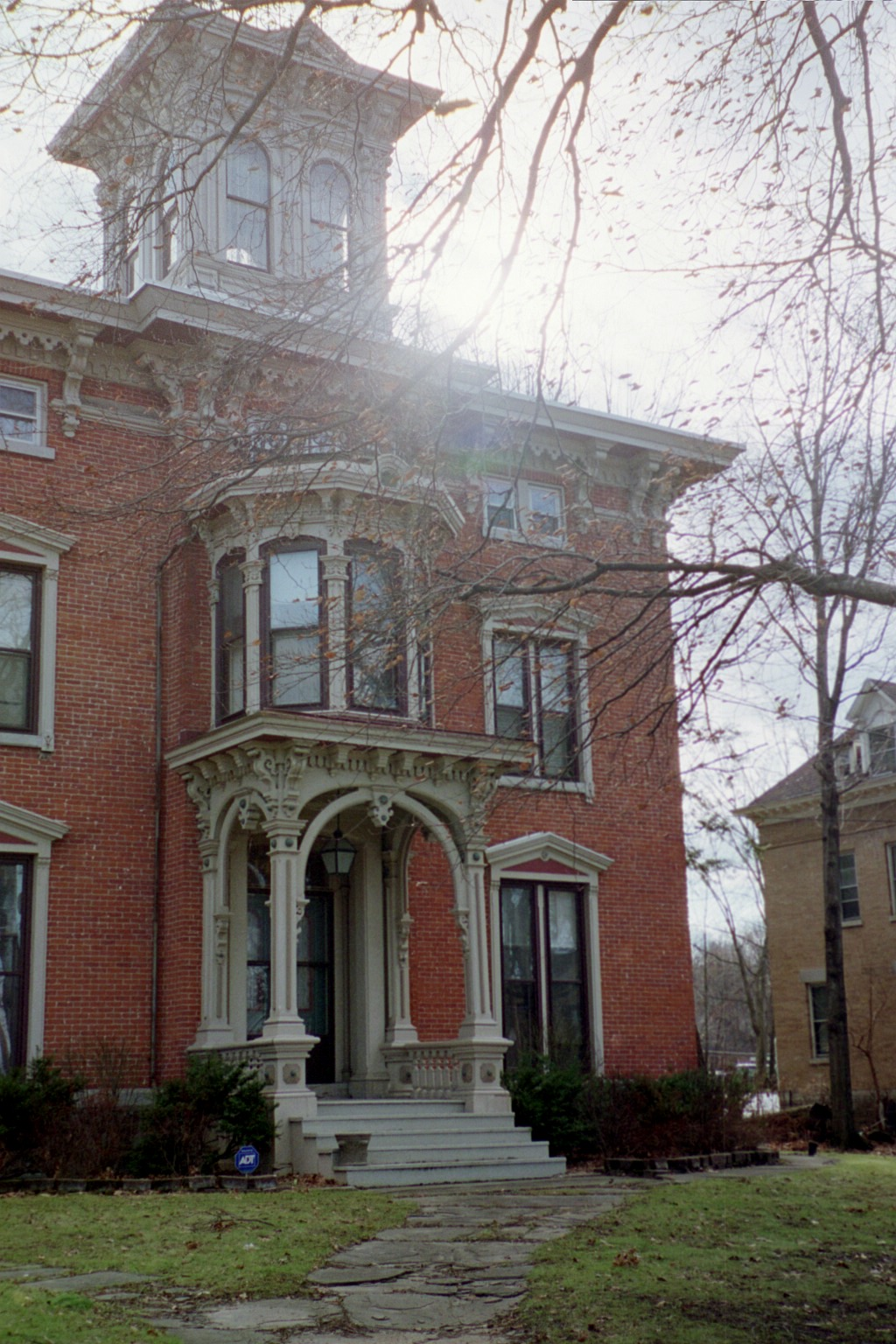
- The Millar-Wheeler House in Autumn

- Location within New York Location within the United States
- Location: 1423 Genesee St., Utica, New York
- Coordinates: 43°5′42.77″N 75°14′37.34″W
- Area: 2 acres (0.81 ha)
- Built: 1866
- Built by: Howard, Ambrose G.
- Architectural style: Italianate
- NRHP reference No.: 00000093
- Added to NRHP: February 10, 2000

The Millar-Wheeler House is a historic home located at 1423 Genesee Street in Utica, Oneida County, New York. It was built in 1866, and consists of a three-story, square, brick main block and two-story, frame rear wing. It features an ornate Italianate style entrance portico topped by an oriel window, a low-pitched hipped roof with broad eaves and belvedere, and scrolled brackets. It is operated as Rosemont Inn, a bed and breakfast.

It was listed on the National Register of Historic Places in 2000.
