= Jervis Public Library =

- U.S. National Register of Historic Places
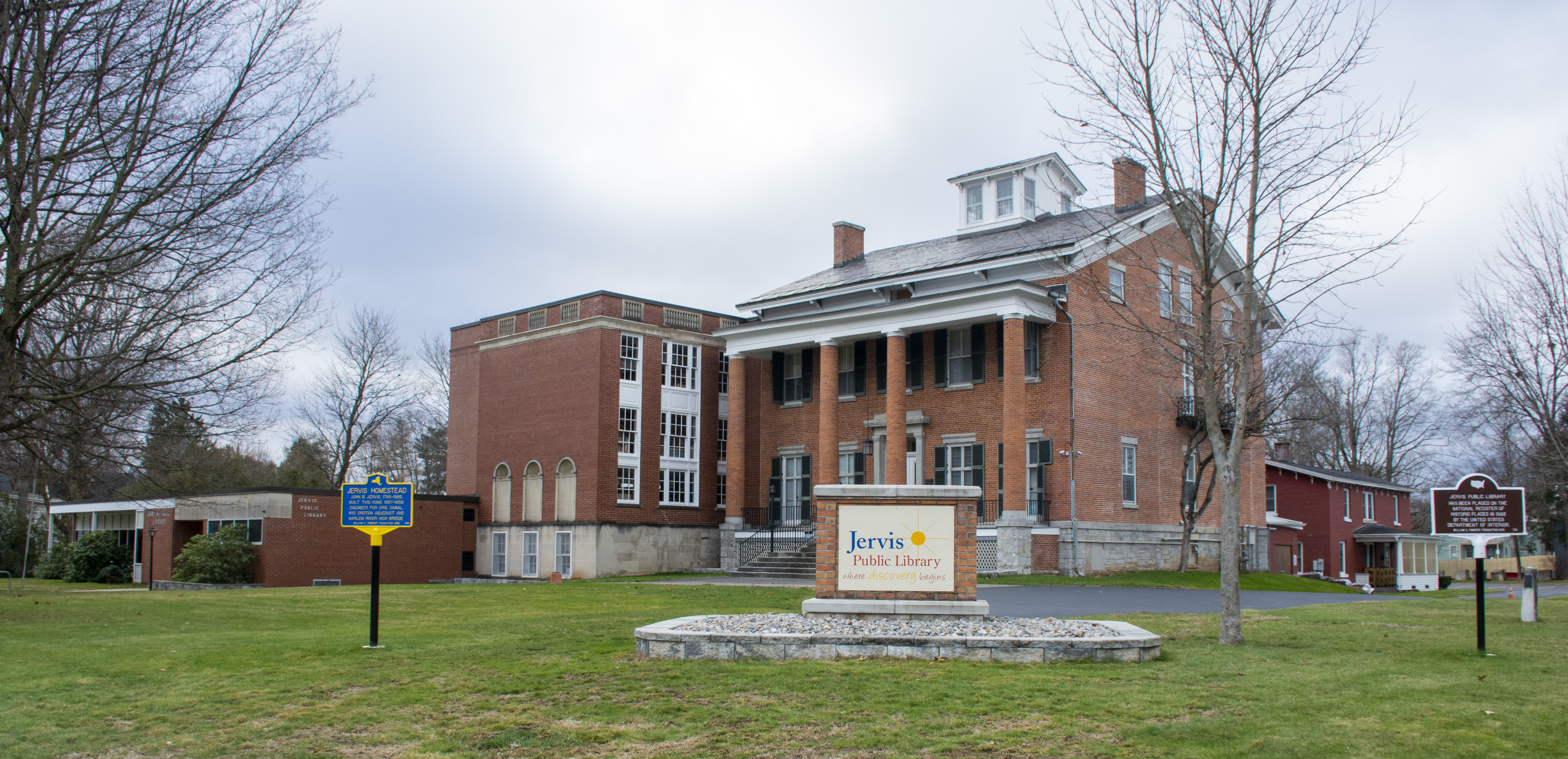

- Location within New York Location within the United States
- Location: 613 N. Washington St. Rome, New York
- Coordinates: 43°13′7″N 75°27′16″W
- Area: 2.2 acres (0.89 ha)
- Built: 1858
- Architect: Jervis, John Bloomfield
- Architectural style: Mid 19th Century Revival
- NRHP reference No.: 82001208
- Added to NRHP: November 4, 1982

Jervis Public Library is a historic library building located in Rome in Oneida County, New York. It was built in 1858 as the residence of John B. Jervis (1795–1885). The original house is a rectangular, 2 1/2-story brick structure with a slate-covered gable roof and cupola. The facade features a 2-story portico supported by four massive Doric order brick columns. A 2-story library extension was added in 1926 and in 1967 a modern library facility was added. Also on the property is a 2-story carriage house built about 1860.

It was listed on the National Register of Historic Places in 1982.
