= Middle Mill Historic District =

Historic district in New York, United States

- U.S. National Register of Historic Places
- U.S. Historic district
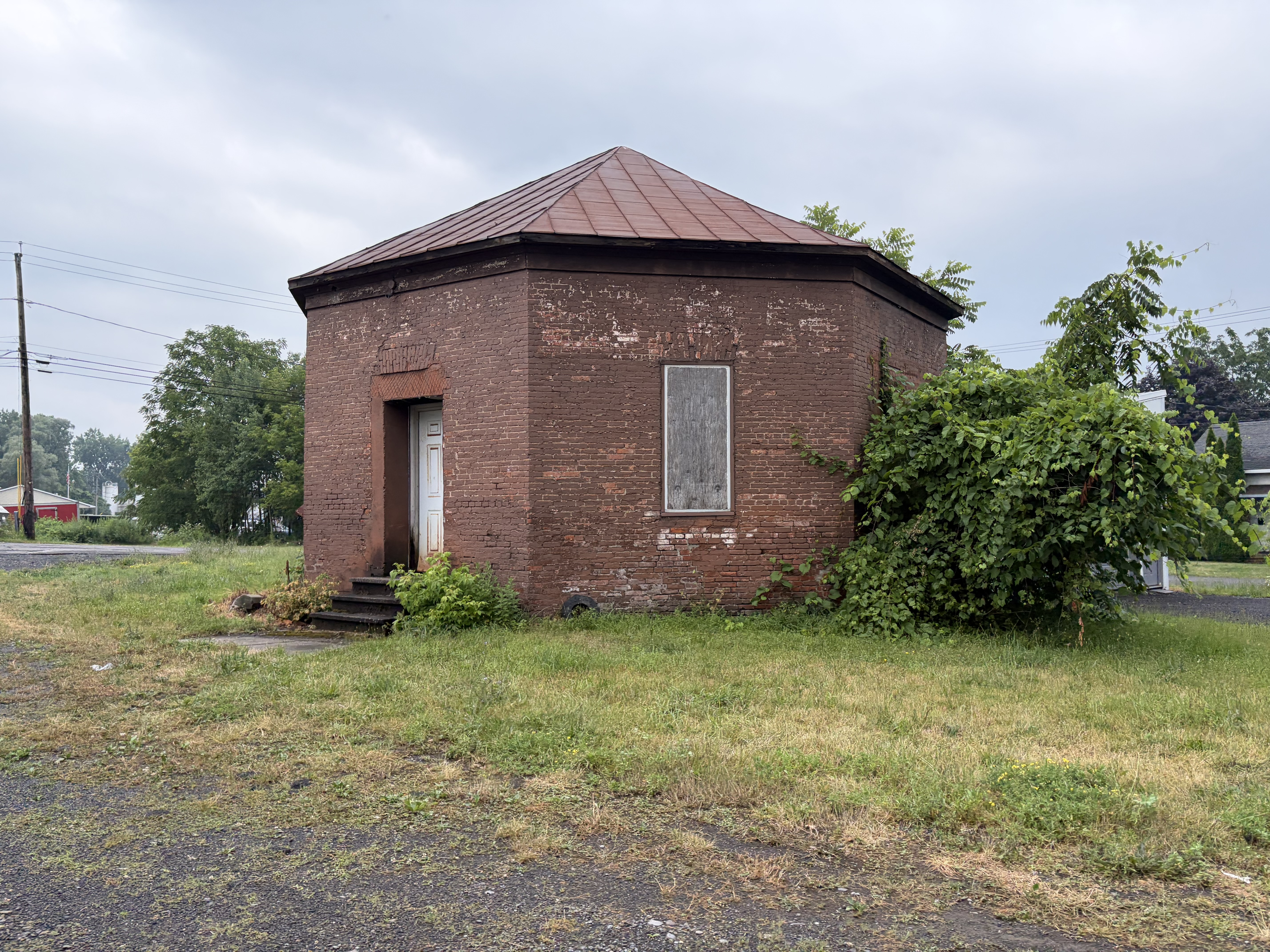
- This octagonal building is a contributing property to the historic district.

- Location within New York Location within the United States
- Location: NY 5A, New York Mills, New York
- Coordinates: 43°6′18″N 75°17′34″W
- Area: 19 acres (7.7 ha)
- Built: 1827
- Architect: Multiple
- Architectural style: Federal
- NRHP reference No.: 76001254
- Added to NRHP: May 28, 1976

Middle Mill Historic District is a national historic district located at New York Mills in Oneida County, New York. The district includes 31 contributing structures and one contributing site. It consists of a grouping of structures clustered in the vicinity of a large mill complex known as Mill Number 2 or the Middle Mills. In addition to the mill complex, there are two churches, rows of factory workers' housing, and a commercial block.

It was listed on the National Register of Historic Places in 1976.
