= Zion Church (Rome, New York) =

Historic church in New York, United States

- U.S. National Register of Historic Places
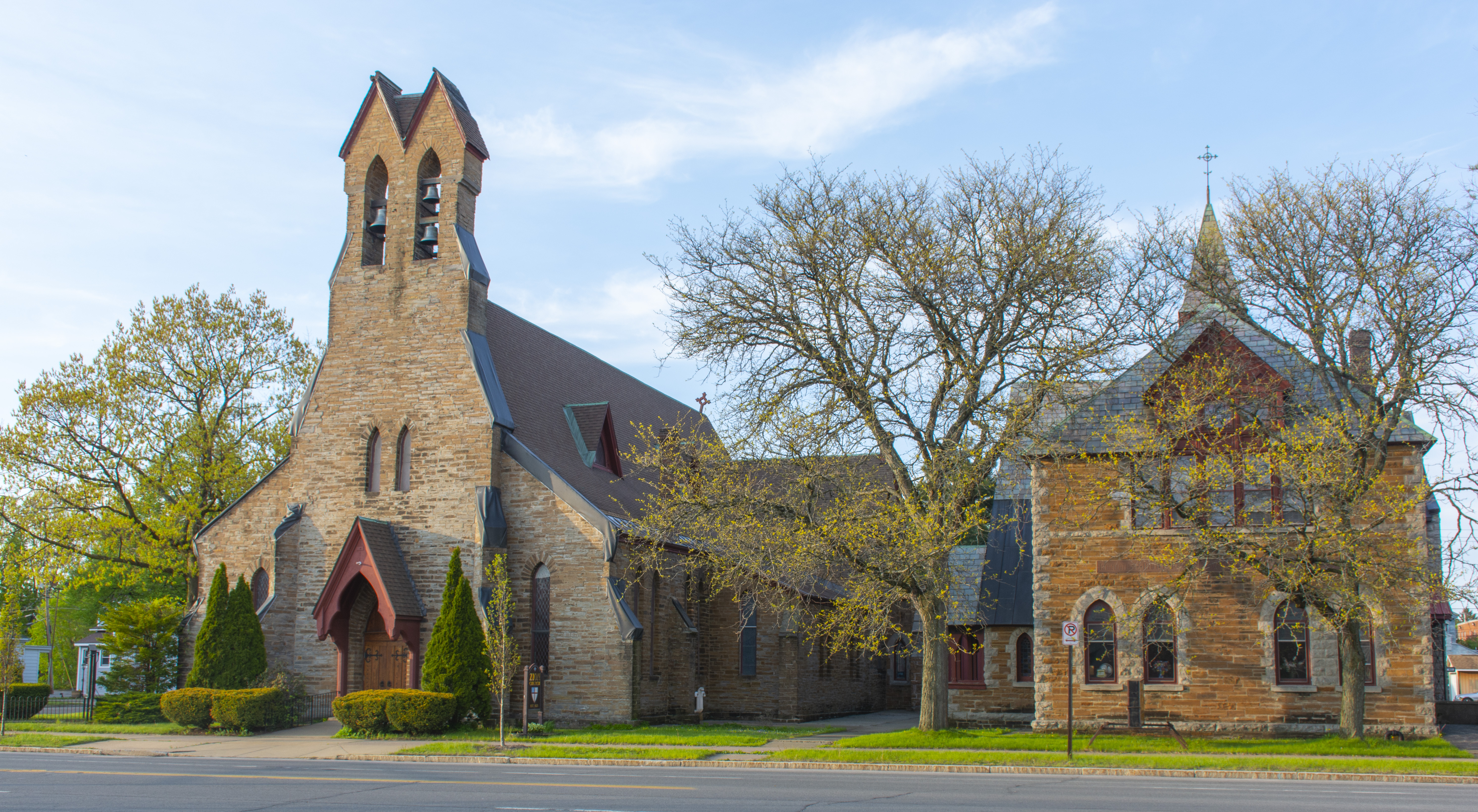

- Location within New York Location within the United States
- Location: 140 W. Liberty St. Rome, New York
- Coordinates: 43°12′46″N 75°27′29″W
- Area: less than one acre
- Built: 1850
- Architect: Upjohn, Richard, (1802-1878); Hubbard, Frederick
- Architectural style: Late Victorian, Gothic Revival styles
- MPS: Historic Churches of the Episcopal Diocese of Central New York MPS
- NRHP reference No.: 97000950
- Added to NRHP: August 21, 1997

Zion Church is a historic Episcopal church building located in Rome, Oneida County, New York. The church was designed by noted national church architect, Richard Upjohn, (1802-1878), built in 1850. It is a three-by-four-bay structure built of bluestone in the Gothic Revival style. Located adjacent is the stone "Clarke Memorial Hall" designed by local designer Frederick Hubbard and built a quarter-century later in 1884–1885.

It was listed in 1997 on the National Register of Historic Places which is maintained by the U.S. Department of the Interior's National Park Service.
