= Rome Catholic School =

Location
- 800 Cypress Street; Rome, (Oneida County), New York 13440; United States; 43°14′18.5″N 75°27′10.5″W

Information
- Type: Private, Coeducational
- Religious affiliation: Roman Catholic
- Established: 1963
- Principal: Michael Powers
- Grades: PK-6
- Colors: Red and White
- Team name: Redwings
- Athletic Director: Joe Melioris
- Website: www.romecatholic.org

Rome Catholic School is a private, tuition funded, co-education school in Rome, New York. Rome Catholic School provides education, based in Roman Catholicism, to students from pre-kindergarten through 6th grade. It is within the auspices of the Roman Catholic Diocese of Syracuse.

== History ==
Rome Catholic is located at 800 Cypress Street in Oneida County, New York. The school replaced the Academy of Holy Names (1873-1963) and St. Aloysius Academy (1850-1963). When Rome Catholic was established in 1963, it was a 9 through 12 high school called Rome Catholic High (RCH). In 1986, 7th and 8th grades were added. During the early 2000s, pre-kindergarten through sixth grade were added and the school was renamed Rome Catholic School (RCS).

In June 2013, the last High School class graduated from RCS. Since then it has been a PK-6 school.

== AFRL Partners ==
A high school course in cyber security was run at Rome Catholic School starting in the spring semester of 2006. This program was affiliated with the US Air Force Research Laboratory in Rome, NY and supported by Syracuse University.

The course was subsequently rolled out to a dozen New York State High Schools as part of Syracuse University Project Advance
