= Mills House (Rome, New York) =

Historic house in New York, United States

- U.S. National Register of Historic Places
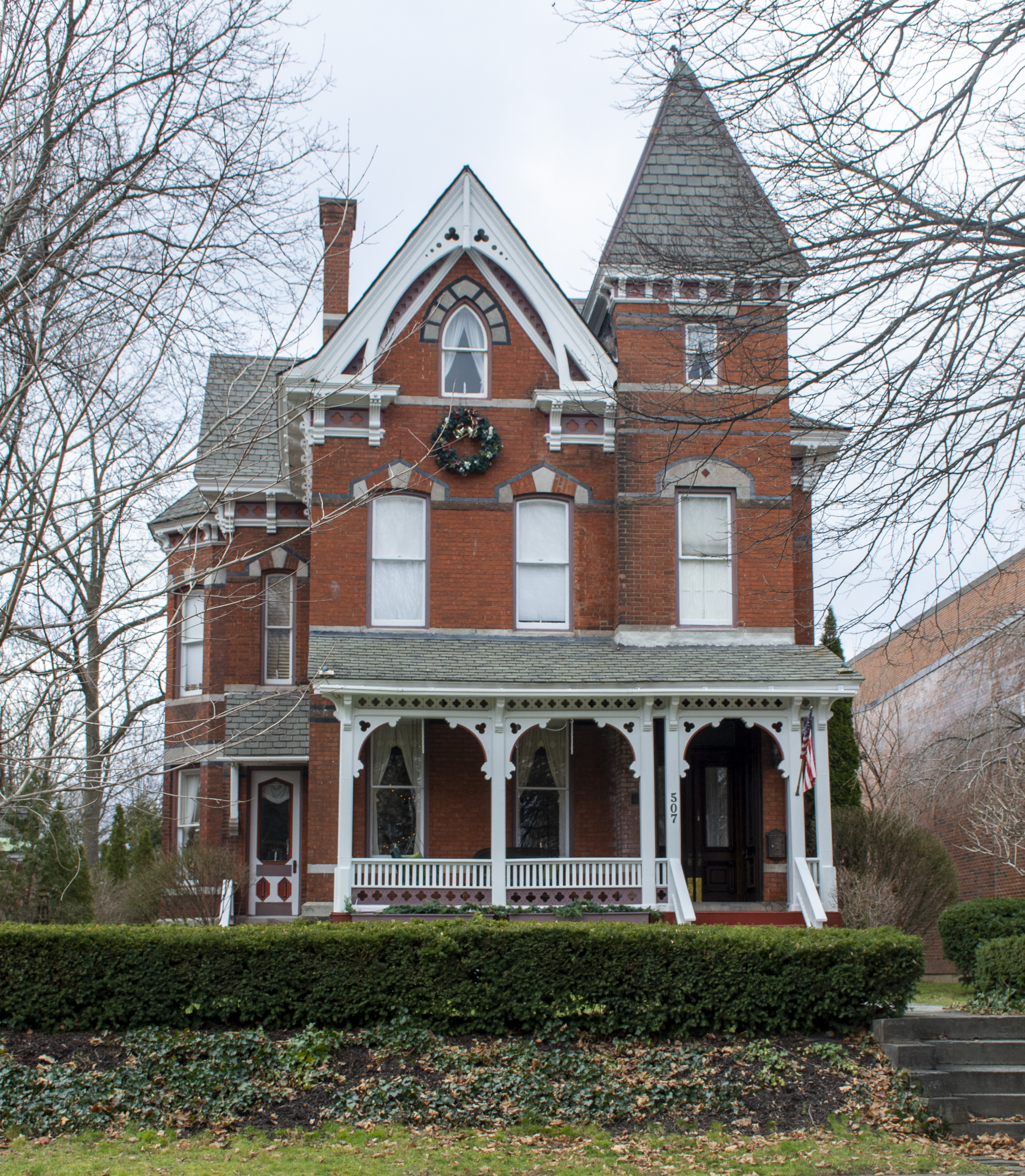

- Location within New York Location within the United States
- Interactive map showing the location of Mills House
- Location: 507 N. George St. Rome, New York
- Coordinates: 43°13′5″N 75°27′28″W
- Area: less than one acre
- Built: 1877
- Architect: Putnam, R.A.
- Architectural style: Late Victorian, Gothic
- NRHP reference No.: 97000566
- Added to NRHP: June 13, 1997

Mills House is a historic home located at Rome in Oneida County, New York. It is an eclectic High Victorian Gothic style brick residence built in 1877. It has a 2 1/2-story, gable-roofed main block and hip-roofed, square, brick kitchen wing. It features a corner tower with pyramidal roof.

It was listed on the National Register of Historic Places in 1997.
