= Rome, New York =

City in New York, United States

- City
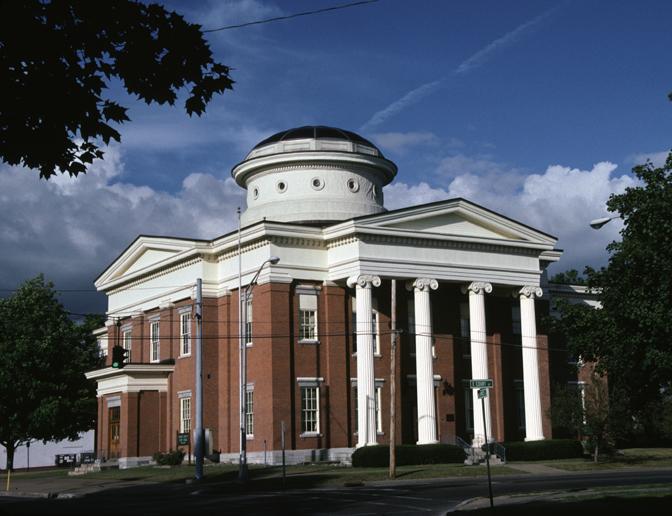
- Oneida County Courthouse
- Nickname: The Copper City
- Motto: Center of It All
- Location within Oneida County and New York

- Location within New York Location within the United States
- Coordinates: 43°13′10″N 75°27′48″W
- Country: United States
- State: New York
- County: Oneida
- Incorporated: 1870

Government
  - Type: Mayor-Council
  - Mayor: Jeffrey M. Lanigan (R)

Area
  - Total: 75.66 sq mi (195.95 km^{2})
  - Land: 74.85 sq mi (193.87 km^{2})
  - Water: 0.80 sq mi (2.08 km^{2}) 0.99%
- Elevation: 456 ft (139 m)

Population (2020)
  - Total: 32,127
  - Density: 429.2/sq mi (165.71/km^{2})
- Demonym: Roman
- Time zone: UTC−5 (Eastern (EST))
  - Summer (DST): UTC−4 (EDT)
- ZIP Codes: 13440-13442 (Rome); 13308 (Blossvale); 13478 (Verona)
- Area code: 315
- FIPS code: 36-63418
- GNIS feature ID: 0962840
- Website: romenewyork.com

Rome is a city in Oneida County, New York, United States, located in the central part of the state. The population was 32,127 at the 2020 census. Rome is one of two principal cities in the Utica–Rome Metropolitan Statistical Area, which lies in the "Leatherstocking Country" made famous by James Fenimore Cooper's Leatherstocking Tales, set in frontier days before the American Revolutionary War. Rome is in New York's 21st congressional district.

The city developed at an ancient portage site of Native Americans, including the historic Haudenosaunee nations. This portage continued to be strategically important to Europeans, who also used the main 18th and 19th-century waterways, based on the Mohawk and Hudson rivers, that connected New York City and the Atlantic seaboard to the Great Lakes. The original European settlements developed around fortifications erected in the 1750s to defend the portage, in particular the British Fort Stanwix (1758) built in New York.

Following the American Revolution, the settlement began to grow with the construction of the Rome Canal in 1796, to connect Wood Creek (leading to Lake Ontario) and the headwaters of the Mohawk River. In the same year the state created the Town of Rome as a section of Oneida County. For a time, the small community next to the canal was informally known as Lynchville, after the original owner of the property, the prominent wine merchant Dominick Lynch.

The New York State Legislature converted the Town of Rome into a city on February 23, 1870. The residents have called Rome the City of American History.

== History ==
=== Oneida Carrying Place ===
Rome was founded along an ancient Native American portage path known as the Oneida Carrying Place, Deo-Wain-Sta, or The Great Carrying Place to the Six Nations (Iroquois), or the Haudenosaunee in their language. These names refer to a portage road or path between the Mohawk River to the east, which flows east to the Hudson River, and Wood Creek to the west, which flows into Oneida Lake and, eventually, Lake Ontario via the Oneida and Oswego Rivers. Now located within the modern Rome city limits, this short portage path was the only overland section of a water trade route stretching more than 1,000 miles between Lake Ontario and the lower Hudson. Travelers and traders coming up the Mohawk River from the Hudson had to transfer their cargo and boats and transport them overland between 1 and six miles (depending on the season) to continue west on Wood Creek to Oneida Lake which was drained by the Oswego River that ultimately flowed into Lake Ontario. This ancient trade route joined the Great Lakes and Canada via the Mohawk River to the Hudson River and the Atlantic Ocean.

Perspective map of Rome with list of landmarks from 1886 by L.R. Burleigh

During the French and Indian War, the North American front of the Seven Years' War, this region was the scene of much fighting. The British erected several small forts to guard the Oneida Carrying Place and the lucrative fur trade against French incursions from Canada; however, a combined French regular army, Canadian, and allied Native American force overwhelmed and massacred a British force here in the Battle of Fort Bull. Later in 1758, after several abortive attempts to fortify the area, the British sent a very large force to secure the Oneida Carry and build a stronger fortification, which they named Fort Stanwix.

Following their defeat by Britain during the war, the French ceded their territory in North America east of the Mississippi River to the British. The British signed the Treaty of Fort Stanwix in 1768 with the Haudenosaunee, under the terms of which they promised to preserve areas west of the Appalachian Mountains as an Indian reserve and to prohibit American colonial settlement. The treaty has also been described as "the last desperate effort of the British to create order west of the Appalachians. The British were unable to enforce their promise, as American colonists continued to move west of the Appalachians, causing conflicts with native tribes. The British abandoned Ft. Stanwix after that war; it deteriorated and was eventually torn down, its parts and materials used by settlers for other structures.

=== Revolutionary War and Fort Stanwix ===
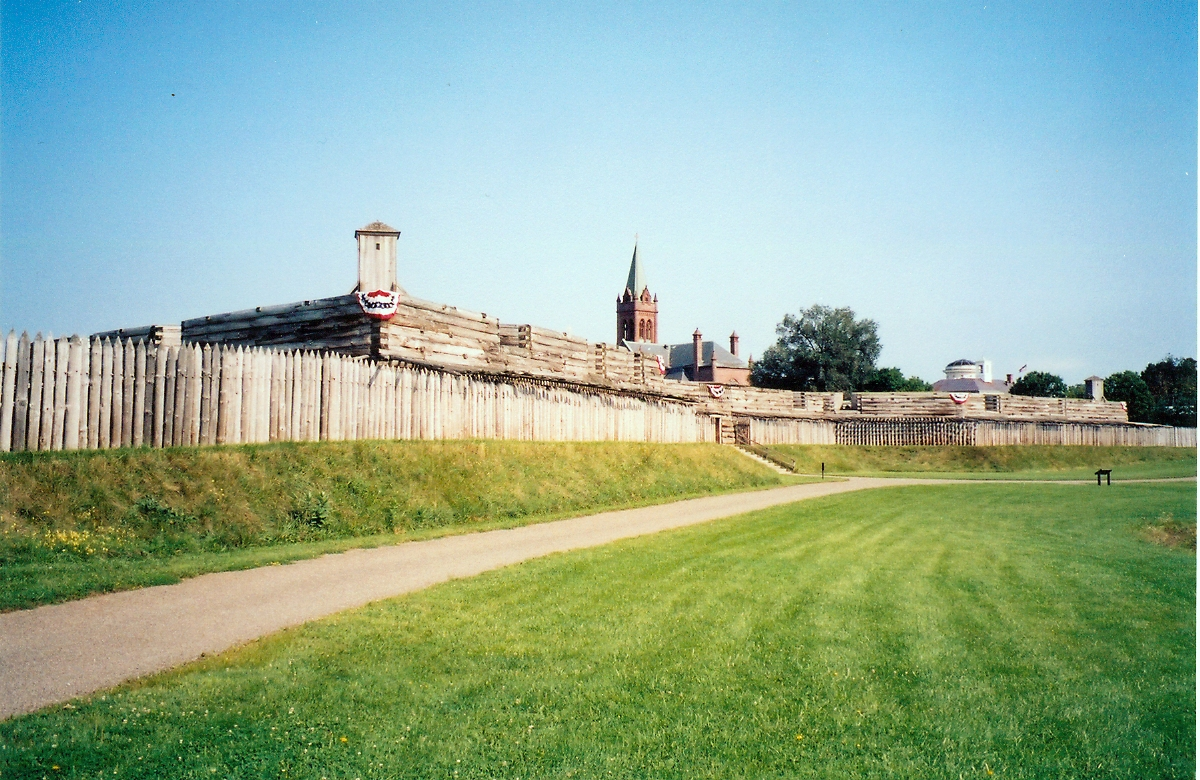
View of the stockade and Fort Stanwix reconstruction completed in 1976 (based on 1758 and 1776 structures)

At the outbreak of the Revolutionary War, American Continental forces took control of the Fort Stanwix site, rebuilding and improving the fort. The installation survived a siege by the British in the Saratoga Campaign of 1777, and it became renowned as "the fort that never surrendered". Patriot militia, regulars, and their Oneida Nation allies under the command of Col. Peter Gansevoort, successfully repelled a 21-day siege in August 1777 by British, German, Loyalist, and Canadian troops and warriors from several Native American nations, all commanded by British Gen. Barry St. Leger. The failed siege, combined with the battle at nearby Oriskany as well as the battles of Bennington, and Saratoga, thwarted a coordinated British effort to take the northern colonies. Following this success, the Americans were able to gain alliances with France and the Netherlands, as both countries were becoming more confident that the rebels had a chance to win.

After the repulsion of the British at Fort Stanwix, bloody fighting erupted along the American northern frontier and throughout the Mohawk Valley. There were heavy losses for both American settlers and the people of the Six Nations, as each side made retaliatory raids against the other in a round of violence. Because many of the Oneida were fighting with the rebels and against the four nations allied with the British, especially the Mohawk and Seneca, the Haudenosaunee had members attacking each other, which they had avoided doing earlier in this century.

The Americans used Fort Stanwix as the primary staging point for attacks against British loyalist units and their Haudenosaunee allies. The Sullivan Expedition of 1779 was launched from here as a scorched earth campaign against villages of Haudenosaunee nations that were allied with the British. Commander George Washington ordered the campaign in retaliation for the fierce frontier attacks in New York, such as the Cherry Valley Massacre by Loyalist irregulars led by Mohawk Chief Joseph Brant and John Butler. The Sullivan campaign destroyed nearly 50 Haudenosaunee villages and their food stores, leading to starvation of many people of these nations during the following winter. Many Haudenosaunee went to Upper Canada for refuge but struggled with starvation there, too.

The American forces abandoned the fort in 1781. After the war, as the area became settled, pioneers took materials to use in constructing their own homes and barns. They built the Rome Canal along Wood Creek, to connect it to the Mohawk River and enable continuous passage by water from Lake Ontario via the Mohawk and Hudson rivers to New York City.

After completion of the Erie Canal in 1825, development of Rome increased. The city became an industrial and trade center in the western Mohawk Valley. The fort site was reduced to a mound of dirt, with bushes and grasses growing over it. During the Great Depression in the early 20th century, Congress passed the Fort Stanwix Act of 1935 to establish the fort as a National Monument because of the site's historic importance. The site was administered by the National Park Service (NPS).

In 1973, the NPS began reconstruction of Fort Stanwix, based on historical evidence related to 18th-century construction and occupation. It was completed in 1976. The fort is operated by the National Park Service as a museum. On July 2, 2005, the Marinus Willet Center opened on the grounds of the monument. It provides audio-visual programs to orient visitors, as well as secure storage space for the museum's collection of artifacts and related historic materials.

=== Commercial growth: Erie Canal ===
The critical east/west American trade route through the frontier was improved by construction of the Erie Canal. On July 4, 1817, construction on the canal began in Rome. The Erie Canal reaches a summit in Rome, attaining an elevation of 420 feet. The first phase was completed in 1825, connecting the Hudson River by waterway to the Great Lakes. It resulted in an increase in trade and traffic between communities around the Great Lakes and New York City, stimulating development all along the route.

=== First Cheese Factory ===
In 1851, Jesse Williams founded the first cheese factory in the United States at Rome. Williams also developed the process used today for large-scale cheese manufacturing. Fifteen years later, New York State had about 500 cheese factories operating in a similar fashion. During the later 19th century, there were numerous dairy farms in the area and throughout the Mohawk Valley. Many shipped their milk and cheese to customers in New York City.

=== Copper City ===
During the Industrial Revolution, Rome became known as the "Copper City," as its metal industries produced approximately 10 percent of all copper in the United States.

The City of Rome was incorporated in 1870.

Revere Copper Products, Inc., founded in Rome during 1928 and 1929, is one of the oldest manufacturing companies in the United States. It developed from a series of mergers between several companies, including Revere Copper Company located in Canton, Massachusetts. The first president of Revere Copper Products, Inc, George H. Allen, was formerly the president of Michigan Copper and Brass Company, which was one of the companies included in the merger. The early history of Revere Copper Products, Inc is detailed in the book Copper Heritage: The Story of Revere Copper and Brass, Inc. by Isaac F. Marcosson. At one time, 10 percent of all copper products used in the United States were manufactured in Rome.

=== Cold War to present day ===
Griffiss Air Force Base in Rome was open from 1942 to 1995, when it closed as part of the Base Realignment and Closure process. It remains home to Rome Laboratory, which is now part of the Air Force Research Laboratory, and to the Eastern Air Defense Sector. Some of the land that formerly made up the land has been redeveloped: Rome Free Academy, the city's public high school, moved onto former base land in 2002. Its airstrip is now part of Griffiss Airport.

Woodstock 1999 was held in Rome, at the former Griffiss AFB site. The three-day rock festival was held over the weekend of July 23–25, and drew a crowd of about 200,000 people. Cable network MTV covered the concert extensively, and live coverage of the entire weekend was available on pay-per-view. The festival featured acts including Metallica, Kid Rock, DMX, Red Hot Chili Peppers, Rage Against the Machine, Korn, Limp Bizkit, Alanis Morissette and Wyclef Jean; early reviews for many of the acts were positive. Critics particularly praised performances by George Clinton, Jamiroquai, James Brown, Sheryl Crow, and Rage Against the Machine. However, the festival ended in a riot, with bonfires being lit in the crowd, brawls with police, and looting.

During the September 11 attacks, Boston Center contacted the Eastern Air Defense Sector in Rome at 8:37 AM. This was the first report of a hijacking that reached NORAD on that day.

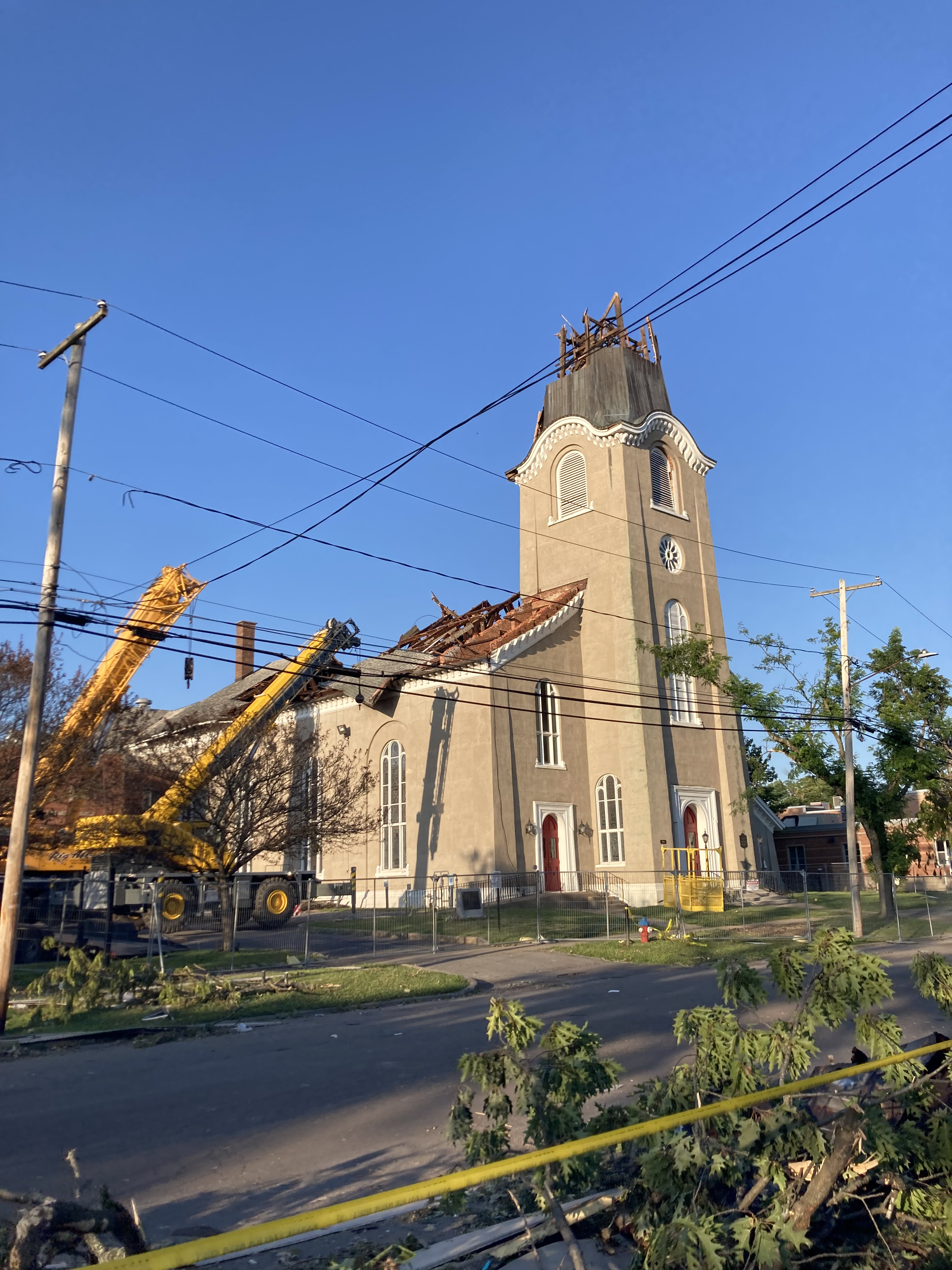
First Presbyterian Church of Rome after sustaining tornado damage.

On July 16, 2024, a high-end EF2 tornado struck Rome, causing widespread power outages and property damage. The tornado touched down just north of the Erie Canal, passed through the center of Rome, and lifted up on the far side of Griffiss Air Force Base. A decommissioned B-52 on display near the airport was moved nearly 25 feet off its platform. Among other heavily damaged structures, two churches were heavily damaged, losing their steeples and having their roofs collapse. Many brick structures collapsed. States of emergency were declared by the city, county, and state governments.

== Geography ==
Rome is the second-largest city by area in New York State, and the 140th largest city in the United States. According to the United States Census Bureau, the city has a total area of 75.7 square miles (196 km^{2}), of which 74.9 square miles (194 km^{2}) is land and 0.8 square miles (2.1 km^{2}) (0.99%) is water.

=== Historic places ===
The following are listed on the National Register of Historic Places:

- First Methodist Episcopal Church of Rome
- Fort Stanwix
- Fort Wood Creek/Fort Bull
- Gansevoort-Bellamy Historic District
- Jervis Public Library
- Mills House
- Rome Arsenal
- Rome Elks Lodge No. 96
- Zion Church

=== Climate ===
Rome has a humid continental climate (or warm-summer climate: Köppen Dfb) with four distinct seasons, characterized by cold winters and temperate summers. Summer high temperatures range from 70–82 °F (21–28 °C). The city is in USDA plant hardiness zone 5b, and native vegetation can tolerate temperatures from −10 to −15 °F (−23 to −26 °C). Rome averages over 120 inches (3,000 mm) of snowfall each winter, mostly due to its proximity to Lake Ontario and the lake-effect snow that it produces.

Climate data for Rome, New York, (1991–2020 normals, (Note: Humidity data calculated from the averages of morning and evening relative humidities.) extremes 1961–present)
Month	Jan	Feb	Mar	Apr	May	Jun	Jul	Aug	Sep	Oct	Nov	Dec	Year
Record high °F (°C)	67 (19)	72 (22)	83 (28)	91 (33)	93 (34)	97 (36)	99 (37)	96 (36)	93 (34)	85 (29)	78 (26)	71 (22)	99 (37)
Mean daily maximum °F (°C)	30.1 (−1.1)	31.8 (−0.1)	41.0 (5.0)	54.9 (12.7)	68.9 (20.5)	76.2 (24.6)	80.9 (27.2)	79.3 (26.3)	72.0 (22.2)	58.9 (14.9)	46.8 (8.2)	35.7 (2.1)	56.4 (13.6)
Daily mean °F (°C)	21.5 (−5.8)	22.5 (−5.3)	31.7 (−0.2)	44.5 (6.9)	56.8 (13.8)	65.3 (18.5)	70.2 (21.2)	68.7 (20.4)	61.4 (16.3)	49.7 (9.8)	39.0 (3.9)	28.3 (−2.1)	46.6 (8.1)
Mean daily minimum °F (°C)	12.9 (−10.6)	13.2 (−10.4)	22.5 (−5.3)	34.1 (1.2)	44.7 (7.1)	54.5 (12.5)	59.5 (15.3)	58.1 (14.5)	50.9 (10.5)	40.5 (4.7)	31.2 (−0.4)	20.9 (−6.2)	36.9 (2.7)
Record low °F (°C)	−31 (−35)	−28 (−33)	−16 (−27)	5 (−15)	24 (−4)	32 (0)	43 (6)	35 (2)	27 (−3)	16 (−9)	−4 (−20)	−21 (−29)	−31 (−35)
Average precipitation inches (mm)	2.50 (64)	2.37 (60)	3.43 (87)	3.72 (94)	4.46 (113)	4.20 (107)	4.25 (108)	3.60 (91)	3.95 (100)	4.67 (119)	3.72 (94)	2.95 (75)	43.82 (1,113)
Average snowfall inches (cm)	31.7 (81)	23.4 (59)	15.1 (38)	3.4 (8.6)	0.0 (0.0)	0.0 (0.0)	0.0 (0.0)	0.0 (0.0)	0.0 (0.0)	0.1 (0.25)	7.3 (19)	20.8 (53)	101.8 (259)
Average precipitation days (≥ 0.01 in)	12.9	14.2	13.2	15.5	14.9	14.0	13.1	13.7	13.4	17.1	15.7	17.0	174.7
Average snowy days (≥ 0.1 in)	15.9	11.7	8.2	2.8	0.0	0.0	0.0	0.0	0.0	0.4	4.2	13.5	56.7
Average relative humidity (%)	66.0	66.2	65.0	64.1	63.3	66.8	66.0	68.2	72.7	69.8	72.3	72.3	67.9
Percentage possible sunshine	42	46	52	58	64	66	65	60	54	48	43	40	53
Source 1: NOAA (snowfall 1981–2010), Western Regional Center
Source 2: Weatherbase

== Demographics ==
Historical population
Census	Pop.	Note	%±
1860	3,584		—
1870	11,000		206.9%
1880	12,194		10.9%
1890	14,991		22.9%
1900	15,343		2.3%
1910	20,497		33.6%
1920	26,341		28.5%
1930	32,338		22.8%
1940	34,224		5.8%
1950	41,682		21.8%
1960	51,646		23.9%
1970	50,148		−2.9%
1980	43,826		−12.6%
1990	44,350		1.2%
2000	34,950		−21.2%
2010	33,725		−3.5%
2020	32,127		−4.7%
U.S. Decennial Census

The city had its peak of population in 1960, with declines caused by restructuring of industry and loss of jobs. Later in the 20th century, the closure of the Air Force base also drew away jobs and residents. The city has worked to develop a new economy. Elements of the base have been redeveloped for new uses, while high-quality research continues.

=== 2020 census ===
As of the 2020 census, Rome had a population of 32,127. The median age was 40.1 years. 21.5% of residents were under the age of 18 and 18.9% of residents were 65 years of age or older. For every 100 females there were 103.1 males, and for every 100 females age 18 and over there were 102.3 males age 18 and over.

81.3% of residents lived in urban areas, while 18.7% lived in rural areas.

There were 13,424 households in Rome, of which 26.4% had children under the age of 18 living in them. Of all households, 33.5% were married-couple households, 22.9% were households with a male householder and no spouse or partner present, and 33.0% were households with a female householder and no spouse or partner present. About 36.9% of all households were made up of individuals and 15.2% had someone living alone who was 65 years of age or older.

There were 14,840 housing units, of which 9.5% were vacant. The homeowner vacancy rate was 1.5% and the rental vacancy rate was 8.0%.

Racial composition as of the 2020 census
Race	Number	Percent
White	26,273	81.8%
Black or African American	2,231	6.9%
American Indian and Alaska Native	145	0.5%
Asian	439	1.4%
Native Hawaiian and Other Pacific Islander	20	0.1%
Some other race	696	2.2%
Two or more races	2,323	7.2%
Hispanic or Latino (of any race)	2,304	7.2%

=== 2000 census ===
As of the 2000 census, there were 34,950 people, 13,653 households, and 8,328 families residing in the city. The population density was 466.4 inhabitants per square mile (180.1/km^{2}). There were 16,272 housing units at an average density of 217.2 per square mile (83.9/km^{2}). The quoted racial makeup of the city was 87.85% white, 7.58% African American, 0.27% Native American, 0.88% Asian American, 0.02% Pacific Islander, 1.35% from other races, and 2.05% from two or more races. Hispanic or Latino people of any race were 4.72% of the population. Like other cities in the region, Rome has numerous Italian-Americans, who maintain a concentration in the Little Italy in the vicinity of East Dominick Street.

There were 13,653 households, out of which 28.1% had children under the age of 18 living with them, 42.6% were married couples living together, 13.9% had a female householder with no husband present, and 39.0% were non-families. 33.2% of all households were made up of individuals, and 14.6% had someone living alone who was 65 years of age or older. The average household size was 2.30 and the average family size was 2.93.

In the city, the population was spread out, with 22.1% under the age of 18, 8.5% from 18 to 24, 29.9% from 25 to 44, 22.3% from 45 to 64, and 17.2% who were 65 years of age or older. The median age was 38 years. For every 100 females, there were 105.1 males. For every 100 females age 18 and over, there were 105.0 males.

The median income for a household in the city was $33,643, and the median income for a family was $42,928. Males had a median income of $31,635 versus $23,899 for females. The per capita income for the city was $18,604. About 12.0% of families and 15.0% of the population were below the poverty line, including 23.4% of those under age 18 and 7.6% of those age 65 or over.

== Economy ==
Rome is headquarters to AmeriCU Credit Union, which serves members in Central and Northern New York.

Rome Memorial Hospital is another major local employer. Rome Hospital opened in 1884. In 1940 it combined with the 1920-founded Murphy Memorial Hospital. The resultant Rome Memorial Hospital is licensed for 129 beds.

== Sports ==
One of Rome's most popular venues is the John F. Kennedy Civic Arena. The facility hosts multiple ice hockey and figure skating events, as well as roller derby bouts. The arena was constructed in 1963–1964. It was fully renovated in 2008.

Between 1964 and 1988, the Rome Knights and later the Copper City Chiefs played their home games on Saturday evenings at the Kennedy Arena. The Chiefs were a semi-professional ice hockey club that competed against Senior and Intermediate level teams from the province of Ontario, Canada; Philadelphia, Pennsylvania; Newark, New Jersey; New England, and cities from the State of New York. The Chiefs were known for a physical and aggressive style of ice hockey, the team roster being built around team toughness. In its 25 years, the Chiefs never had a losing season.

The professional sports franchise, the Rome Frenzy of the Federal Hockey League, made Rome its base and began play in November 2010 at the Kennedy Civic Arena. In February 2011, citing poor attendance, the Frenzy suspended operations and cancelled the last three weeks of the season in Rome.

Rome is also the headquarters of Hamilton College Men's and Women's Rowing. Their boathouse, completed in 2022, is located in Bellamy Harbor Park off the Erie Canal.

== Government ==
The city government consists of a mayor and a common council. The mayor is elected at large. The common council consists of seven members elected from single member districts.

== Education ==
Most of Rome is located in the Rome City School District. Other parts are in the Oriskany Central School District, Sherrill City School District, and Westmoreland Central School District. The first district operates Rome Free Academy.

Rome Catholic School—since 2013 a PK–6 school—was previously a high school. In 2006 it piloted an early Cyber Security course for students in collaboration with the Air Force and Syracuse University which was subsequently rolled out to other New York State High Schools.

New York State School for the Deaf is in Rome.

== Transportation ==
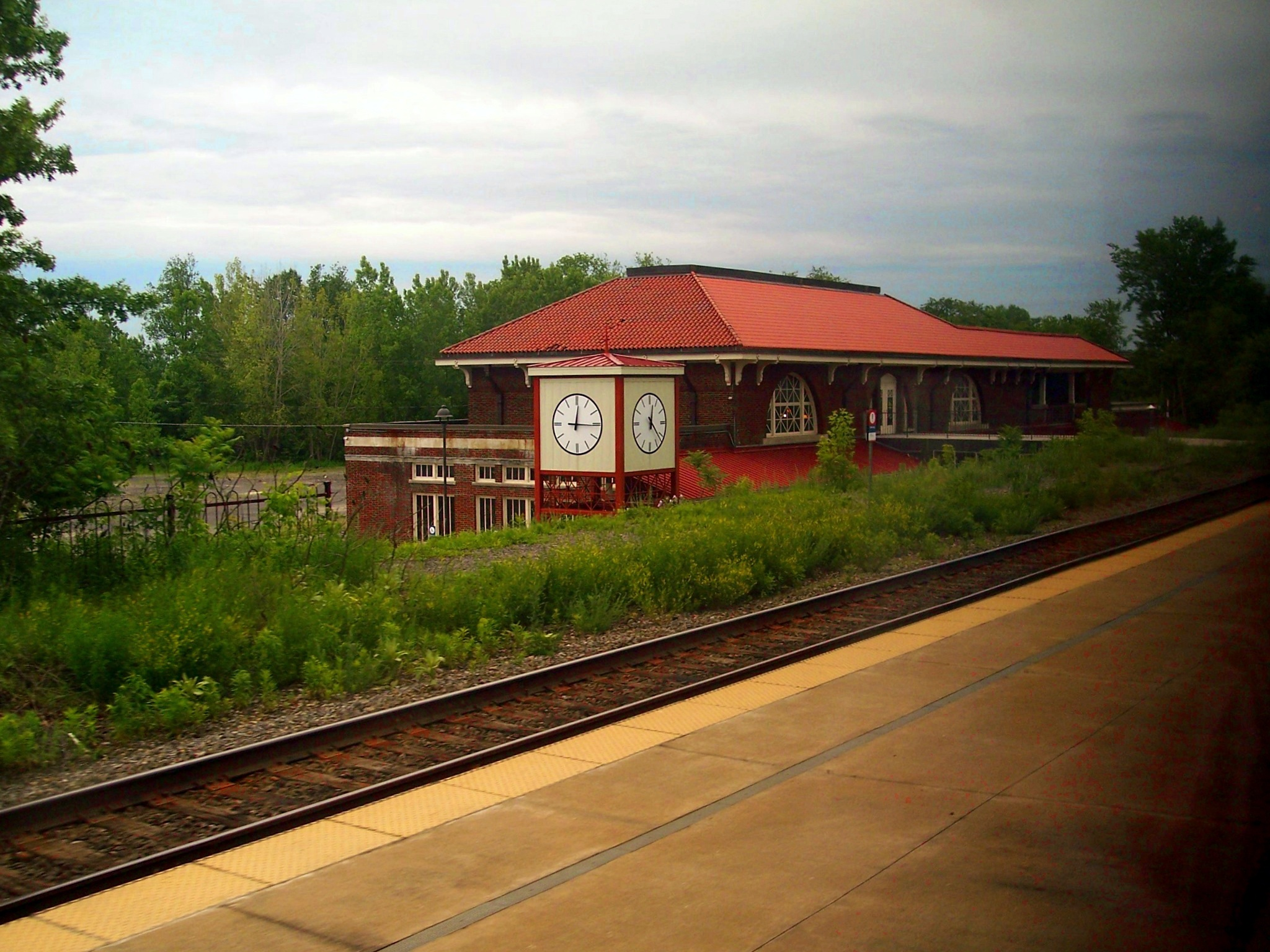
Rome railroad station

=== Highways ===
Rome's primary road connection is the Utica-Rome Expressway, a freeway section of New York State Route 49. The expressway runs 14 miles from Rome to Utica where it meets I-90, I-790, NY 5, NY 12, and NY 8 in a massive cloverleaf interchange.

New York State Route 26, New York State Route 46, New York State Route 49 and New York State Route 69 converge in downtown Rome and are part of two separate triplexes. New York State Route 233 becomes part of a duplex with NY 69 south of the inner district before meeting its northern terminus at the Utica-Rome Expressway (NY 49). New York State Route 365 passes through the eastern portion of the outer district before becoming part of the Utica-Rome Expressway at an interchange.

=== Rail and public transit ===
Rome's Amtrak station is served by Amtrak's Empire Service, with two daily trains in each direction between Niagara Falls and New York City. The daily Maple Leaf serves locations between Toronto and New York.

CENTRO buses run six routes in Rome, two of which serve the Amtrak station.

=== Air ===
Griffiss Air Force Base closed in 1995 and was converted into Griffiss International Airport. It has general aviation as well as military use. No scheduled commercial service uses the airport.

== See also ==
- Capitol Theatre (Rome, NY)
