= Gansevoort–Bellamy Historic District =

Historic district in New York, United States

- U.S. National Register of Historic Places
- U.S. Historic district
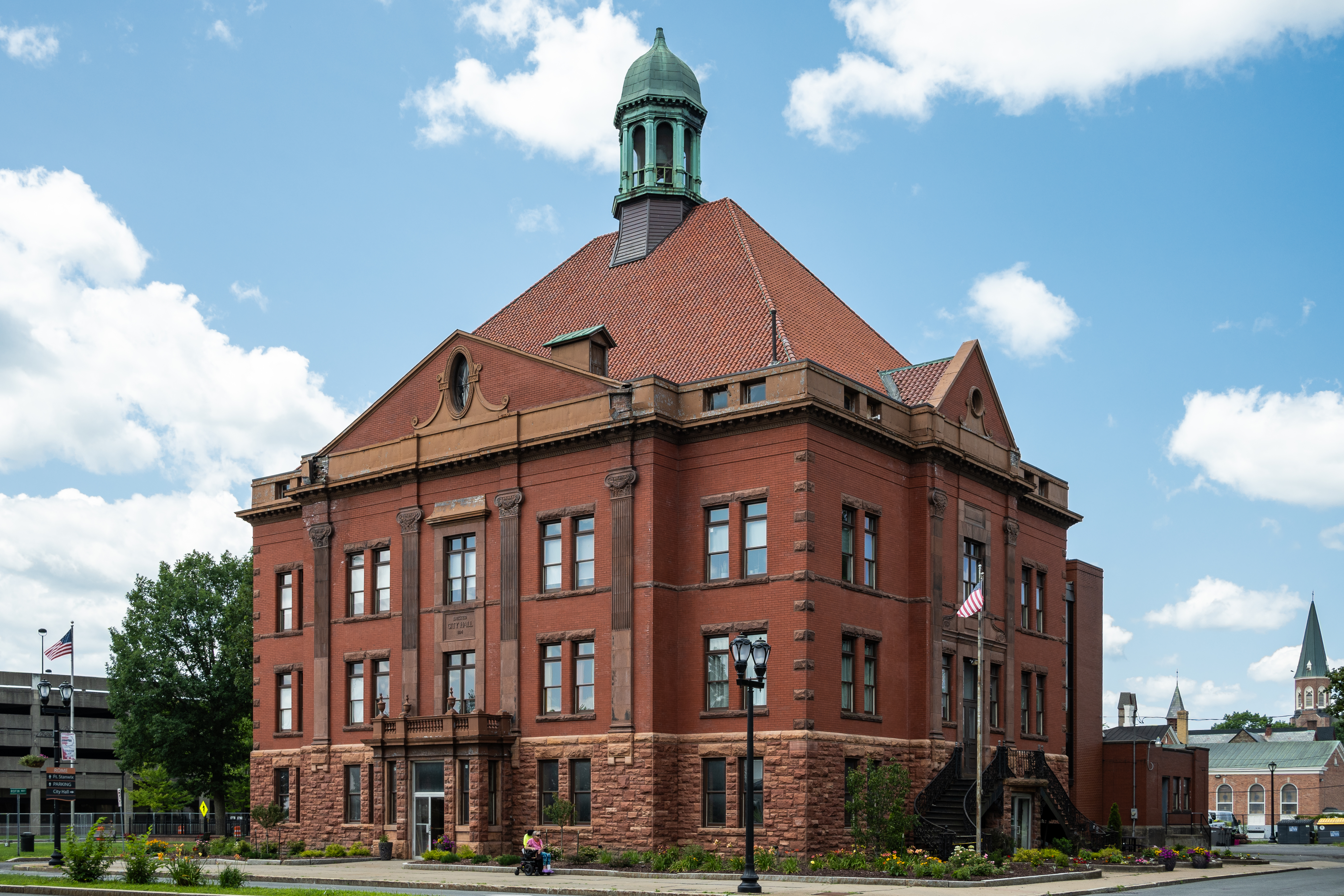
- Rome City Hall, July 2023

- Location within New York Location within the United States
- Location: Roughly bounded by Liberty, Steuben, and Huntington Sts. to Bissell Ave, Rome, New York
- Coordinates: 43°12′47″N 75°27′21″W
- Area: 0 acres (0 ha)
- Architect: Multiple
- NRHP reference No.: 75001213
- Added to NRHP: November 12, 1975

Gansevoort–Bellamy Historic District is a national historic district located at Rome in Oneida County, New York, USA. The district includes ten contributing buildings, two contributing structures and two contributing objects. Located within the district are the former Rome City Hall, U.S. Post Office, Oneida County Courthouse and St. Peter's Catholic Church.

It was listed on the National Register of Historic Places in 1975.
