= Joseph Morelle (disambiguation) =

Some people named Joseph Morelle:

- Joseph Morelle, U.S. Representative for New York's 25th congressional district since 2018.
- Joe Morelle, chef notable for creating Utica greens.
