= Chicken riggies =

American pasta dish

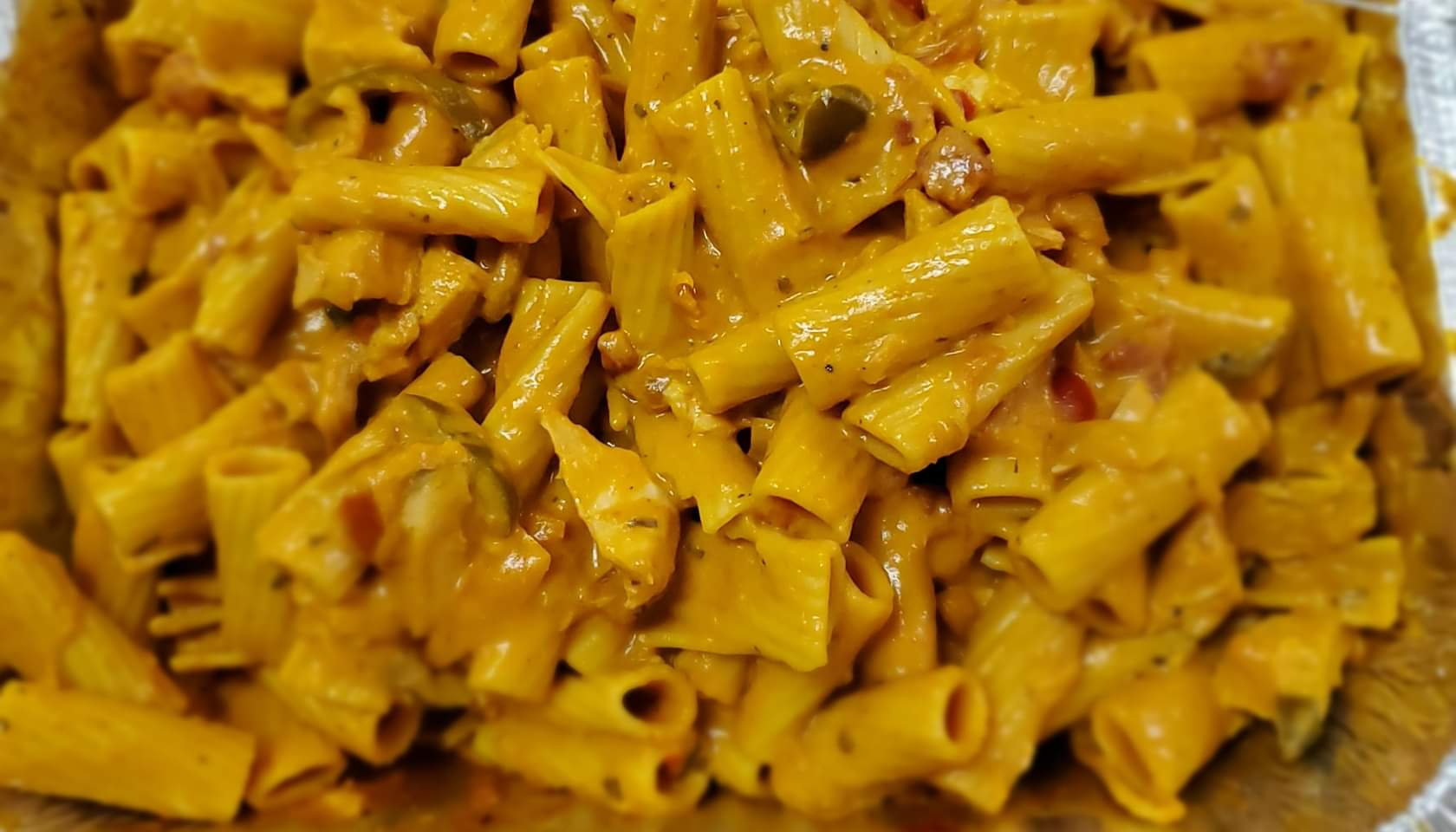
- Alternative names: Utica riggies
- Type: Pasta
- Place of origin: Utica, New York, United States
- Main ingredients: Chicken, peppers, rigatoni, tomato sauce

Chicken riggies or Utica riggies is an Italian-American pasta dish native to the Utica–Rome area of New York State. Although many variations exist, it is a pasta-based dish typically consisting of chicken, rigatoni, and hot or sweet peppers in a spicy cream and tomato sauce. Its origin is unclear, with many chefs from the Utica area claiming the dish.

== See also ==
- Chicken tikka masala, a similar Indo-British dish
- List of chicken dishes
- List of pasta dishes
- Utica greens
