= Lower Genesee Street Historic District =

Historic district in New York, United States

- U.S. National Register of Historic Places
- U.S. Historic district
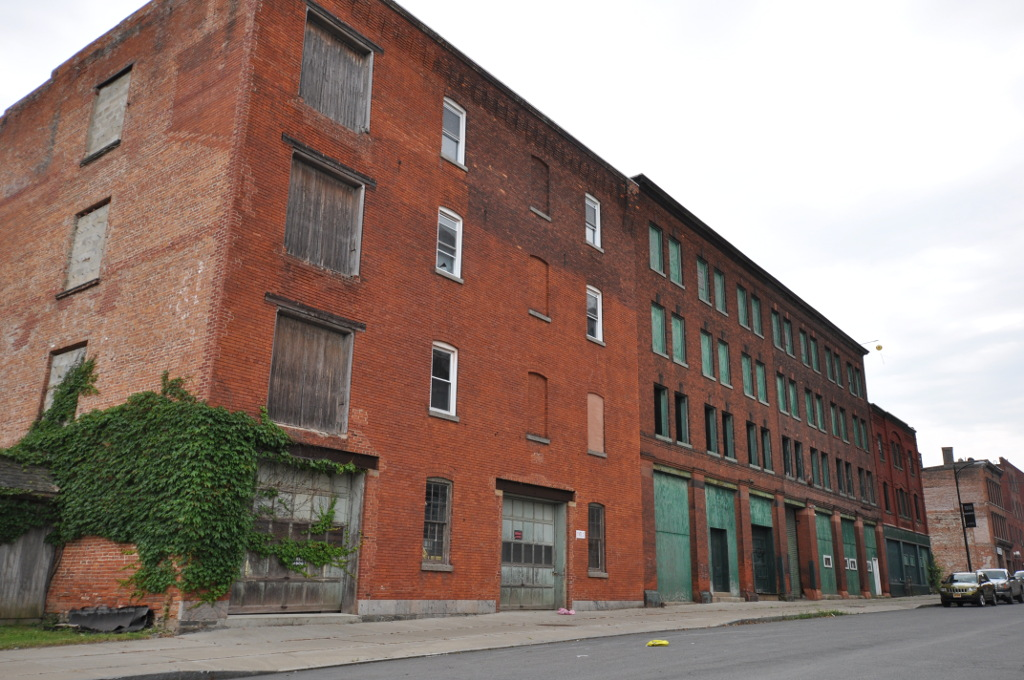

- Location within New York Location within the United States
- Location: Roughly bounded by Genesee, Liberty, Seneca, and Whitesboro Sts. (both sides), Utica, New York
- Coordinates: 43°6′15″N 75°13′42″W
- Area: 13 acres (5.3 ha)
- Built: 1830
- Architect: Multiple
- Architectural style: Greek Revival, Federal, Romanesque
- NRHP reference No.: 82001209
- Added to NRHP: October 29, 1982

Lower Genesee Street Historic District is a national historic district located at Utica in Oneida County, New York. The district includes 45 contributing buildings and encompasses a collection of commercial and industrial buildings in the north center of the city. The oldest extant buildings in the city are located here, which includes buildings dating from 1830 to 1929.

It was listed on the National Register of Historic Places in 1982.
