= Utica, New York =

City in New York, United States

Utica
- City
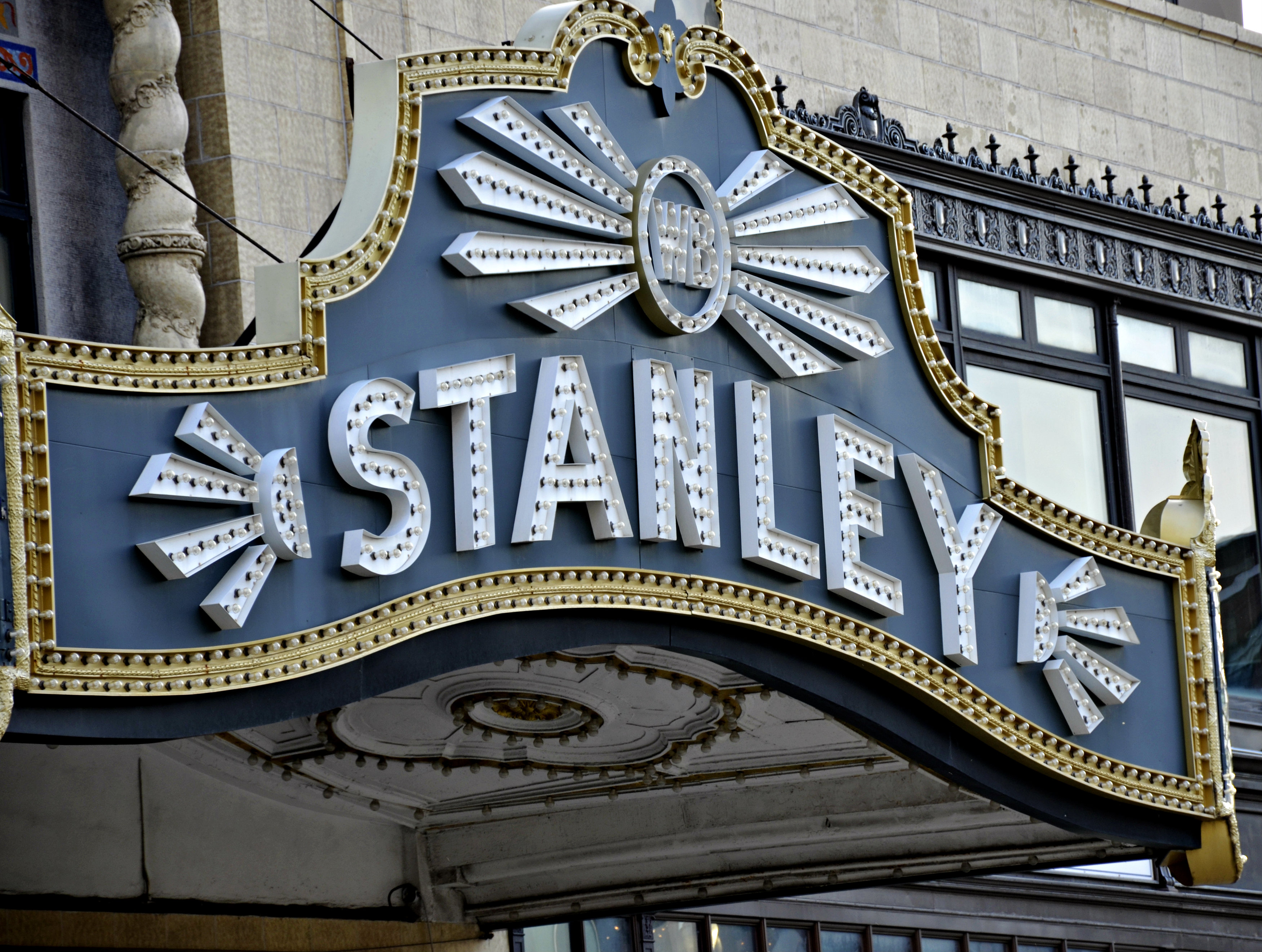
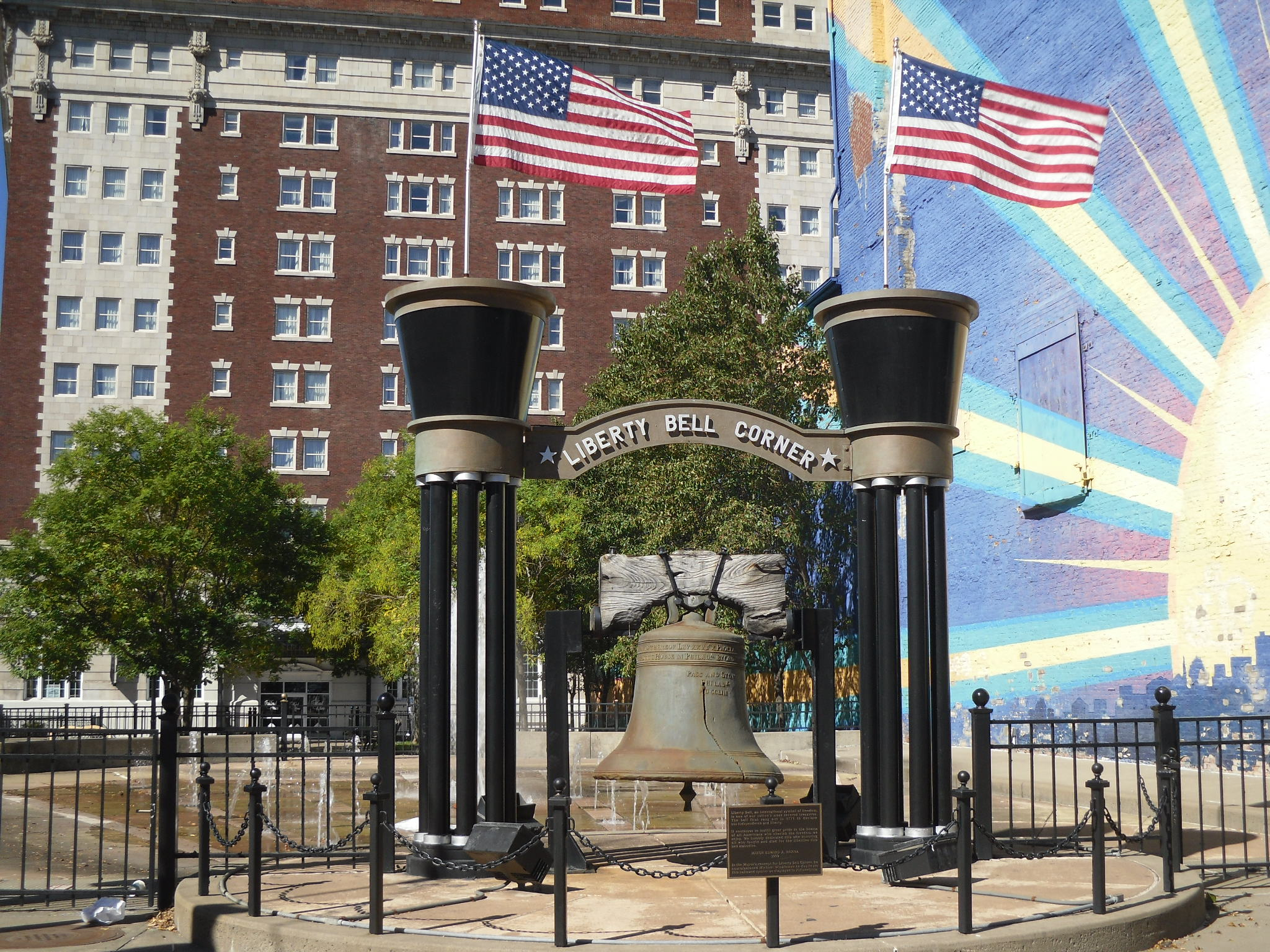
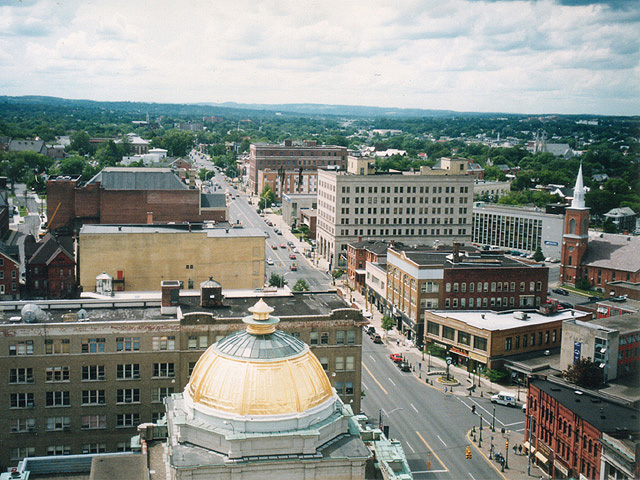
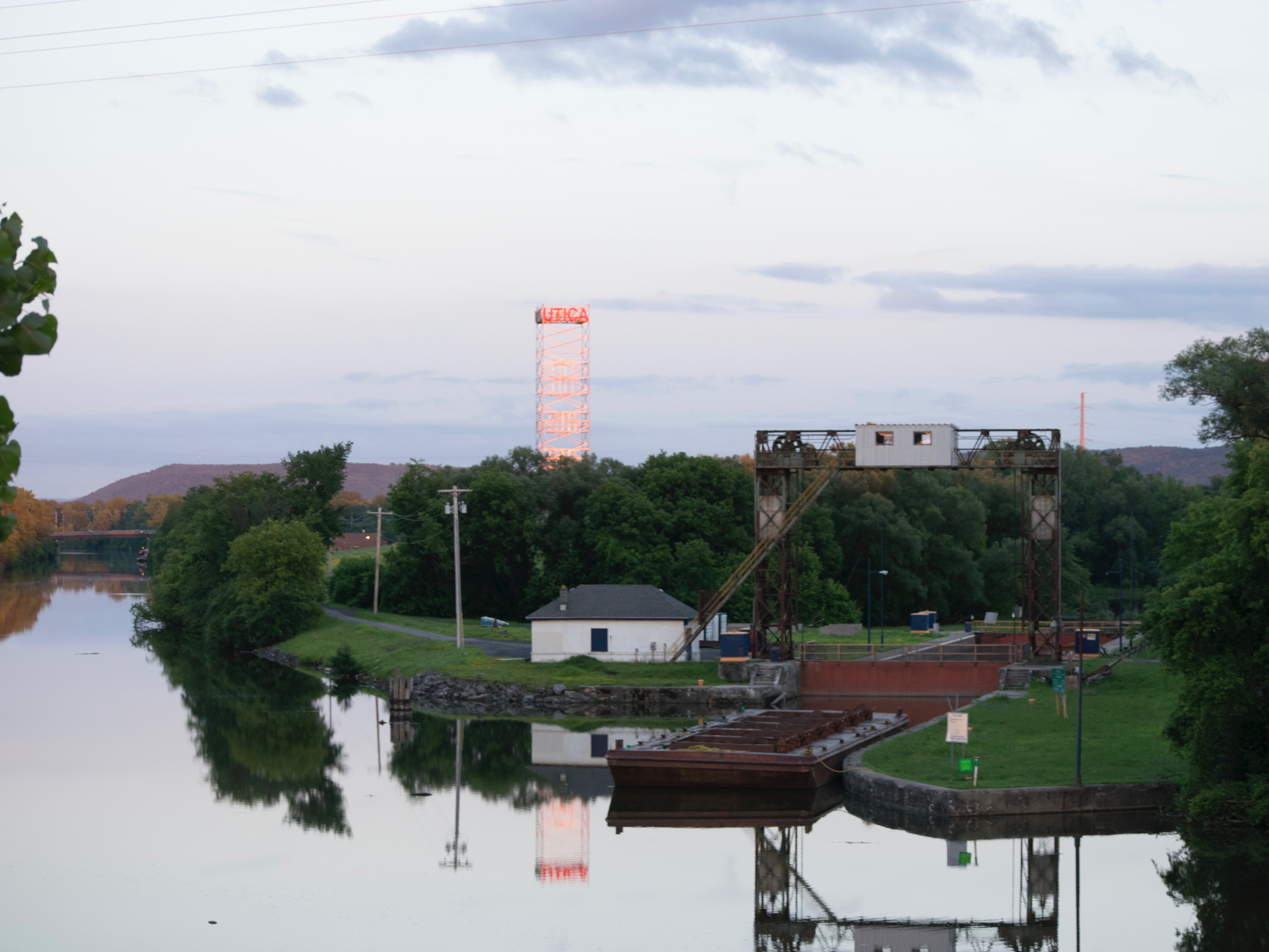
- Skyline Stanley Theater Liberty Bell Corner Looking south on Utica's Genesee Street Utica Tower and harbor lock

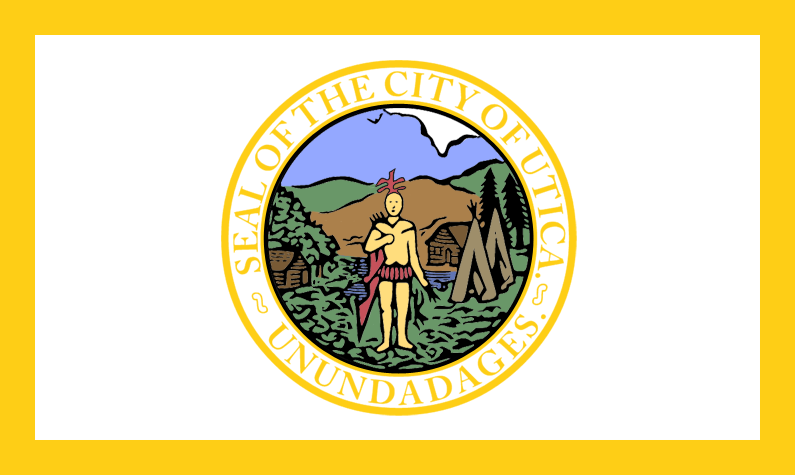
- Flag Seal Logo
- Nicknames: The Handshake City, Sin City, Elm Tree City
- Interactive map of Utica
- Location within New York Location within the United States
- Coordinates: 43°06′03″N 75°13′57″W
- Country: United States
- State: New York
- Region: Mohawk Valley, Central New York
- Metro: Utica–Rome
- County: Oneida
- Land grant (village): January 2, 1734
- Incorporated (village): April 3, 1798
- Incorporated (city): February 13, 1832

Government
  - Type: Strong mayor-council
  - Mayor: Michael Galime (R)

Area
  - City: 16.98 sq mi (43.97 km^{2})
  - Land: 16.72 sq mi (43.31 km^{2})
  - Water: 0.25 sq mi (0.66 km^{2})
- Elevation: 456 ft (139 m)

Population (2020)
  - City: 65,283
  - Density: 3,904.0/sq mi (1,507.33/km^{2})
  - Urban: 117,328 (U.S.: 268th)
  - Metro: 297,592 (U.S.: 163rd) (Note: Estimated MSA rank as of July 1, 2014.)
- Demonym: Utican

GDP
  - Metro: $11.560 billion (2022)
- Time zone: UTC−5 (Eastern (EST))
  - Summer (DST): UTC−4 (EDT)
- ZIP Codes: 13501-13505, 13599
- Area code: 315
- FIPS code: 36-76540
- GNIS feature ID: 0968324
- Website: cityofutica.com

Utica (/ˈjuːtɪkə/) is a city in the U.S. state of New York, and the county seat of Oneida County. The tenth-most populous city in New York, its population was 65,283 in the 2020 census. It is located on the Mohawk River in the Mohawk Valley at the foot of the Adirondack Mountains, approximately 95 mi (153 km) west-northwest of Albany, 55 mi (89 km) east of Syracuse and 240 mi (386 km) northwest of New York City. Utica and the nearby city of Rome anchor the Utica–Rome metropolitan area comprising all of Oneida and Herkimer counties.

Formerly a river settlement inhabited by the Mohawk Nation of the Haudenosaunee Confederacy, Utica attracted European-American settlers from New England during and after the American Revolution. In the 19th century, immigrants strengthened its position as a layover city between Albany and Syracuse on the Erie and Chenango Canals and the New York Central Railroad. During the 19th and 20th centuries, the city's infrastructure contributed to its success as a manufacturing center and defined its role as a worldwide hub for the textile industry.

Like other Rust Belt cities, Utica underwent an economic downturn throughout the mid-20th century. The decline consisted of industrial flight due to offshoring and the closure of textile mills, population loss caused by the relocation of jobs and businesses to suburbs and to Syracuse, and poverty associated with socioeconomic stress and a depressed tax base. With its low cost of living, the city has become a melting pot for refugees from war-torn countries around the world, encouraging growth for its colleges and universities, cultural institutions and economy.

== Name ==
Utica was an ancient Punic and later Roman city in Tunisia.

Many central New York cities are named after places and figures of the Greco-Roman world, including Rome, Syracuse, Ithaca, Troy, Homer, Cicero, and Ovid. This is largely due to the influence of Robert Harpur, a politician and professor at King's College (today Columbia University), who assigned many of the best known names.

An alternative attribution claims that the name was picked during a 1798 meeting at Bagg's Tavern, from a hat holding 13 suggestions.

== History ==
=== Haudenosaunee and colonial settlement ===
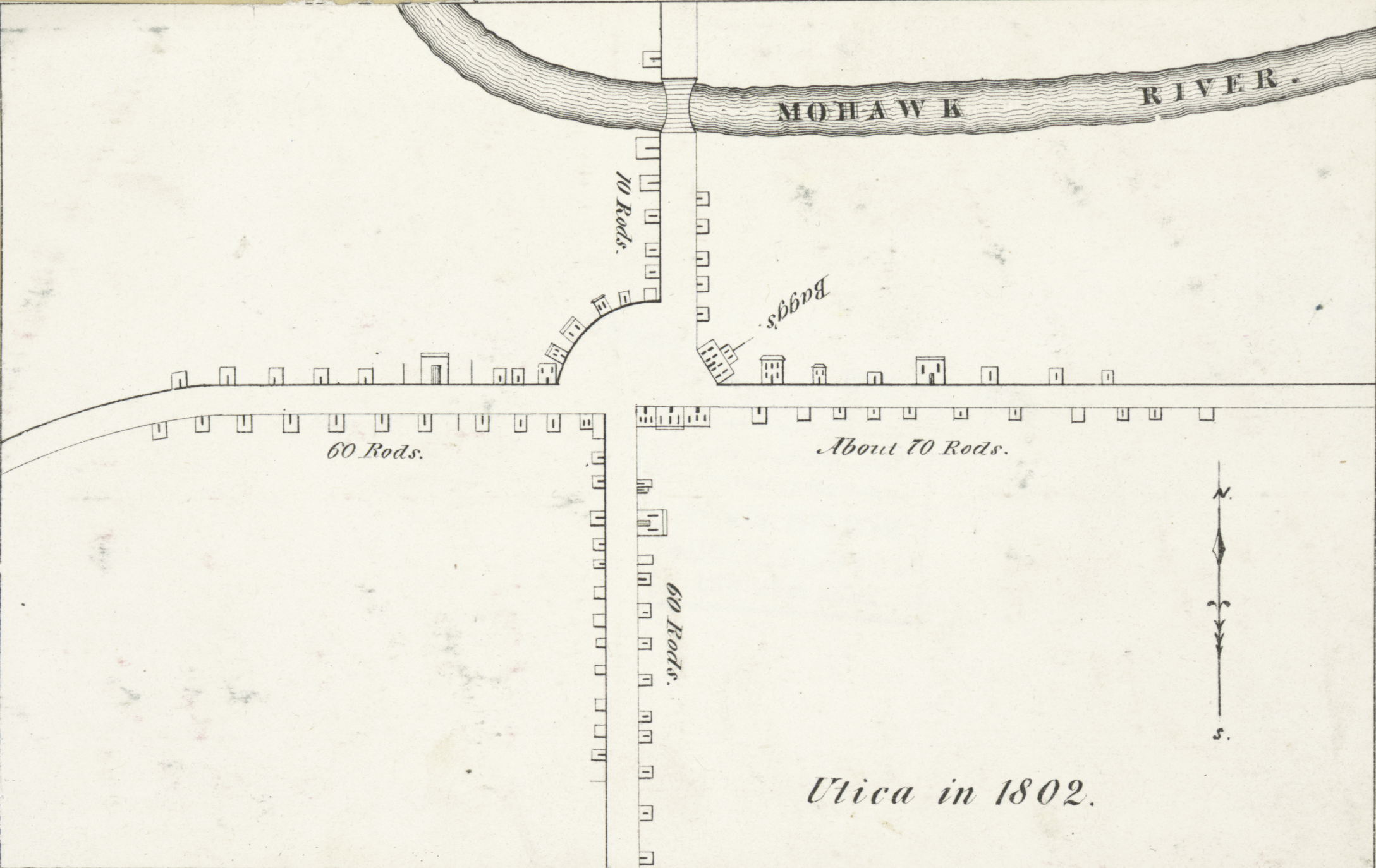
An 1802 engraved map of Utica. The Mohawk River is at the top, and Bagg's Tavern is at the center right.

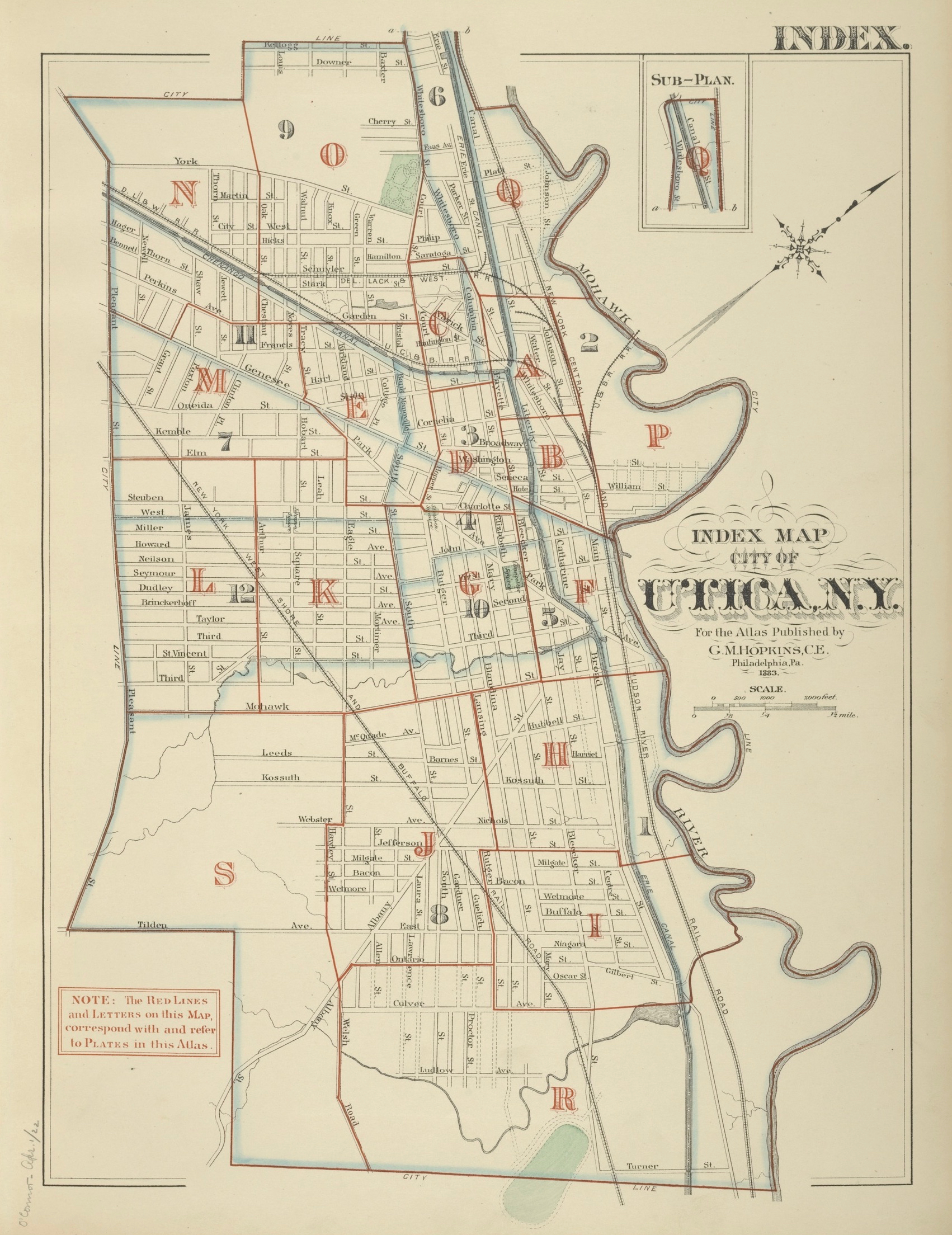
This 1883 index map shows the development around Utica and Bagg's Square, with the Erie Canal (now Oriskany Street) and Chenango Canal towards the upper-right.

Utica was established on the site of Old Fort Schuyler, built by American colonists for defense in 1758 during the French and Indian War, the North American front of the Seven Years' War against France. Prior to construction of the fort, the Mohawk, Onondaga and Oneida nations of the Haudenosaunee (Iroquois) Confederacy had controlled this area southeast of the Great Lakes region as early as 4000 BC. The Mohawk were the largest and most powerful nation in the eastern and lower Mohawk Valley. Colonists had a long-standing fur trade with the Mohawk, in exchange for firearms and rum. The Haudenosaunee nations' dominating presence in the region prevented the Province of New York from expanding past the middle of the Mohawk Valley until after the American victory over the British and British-allied Haudenosaunee in the Revolutionary War. Following the war several Haudenosaunee nations were forced to cede lands to the new State Of New York.

The land housing Old Fort Schuyler was part of a 20,000-acre (81 km^{2}) portion of marshland granted by King George II to New York governor William Cosby on January 2, 1734. Since the fort was located near several trails (including the Great Indian Warpath), its position—on a bend at a shallow portion of the Mohawk River—made it an important fording point. The Mohawk call the bend Unundadages ("around the hill"), a name that now appears on the city's seal.

During the American Revolutionary War, border raids from British-allied Haudenosaunee harried the settlers on the frontier. George Washington ordered America’s first Rangers to enter Central New York and suppress the Haudenosaunee threat. Sullivan's Expedition destroyed more than 40 Haudenosaunee villages and their winter stores, causing starvation. In the aftermath of the war, numerous colonial settlers migrated into the region of New York from New England, especially Connecticut.

In 1794 a state road, Genesee Road, was built from Utica west to the Genesee River. That year a contract was awarded to the Mohawk Turnpike and Bridge Company to extend the road northeast to Albany, and in 1798 it was extended. The Seneca Turnpike was key to Utica's development, replacing a worn footpath with a paved road. The village became a rest and supply area along the Mohawk River for goods and the many people moving through Western New York to and from the Great Lakes.

=== Incorporation of Utica ===
The boundaries of the village of Utica were defined in an act passed by the New York State Legislature on April 3, 1798. Utica expanded its borders in subsequent 1805 and 1817 charters. On April 5, 1805, the village's eastern and western boundaries were expanded, and on April 7, 1817, Utica separated from Whitestown on its west. After completion of the Erie Canal in 1825, the city's growth was stimulated again. Utica became a printing and publishing center, with many newspapers.

The municipal charter was passed by the state legislature on February 13, 1832. In 1840 the United States Census ranked Utica as the 29th-largest in the country (with over 12,000 residents, more than the populations of Chicago, Detroit or Cleveland).

=== Industry and trade ===
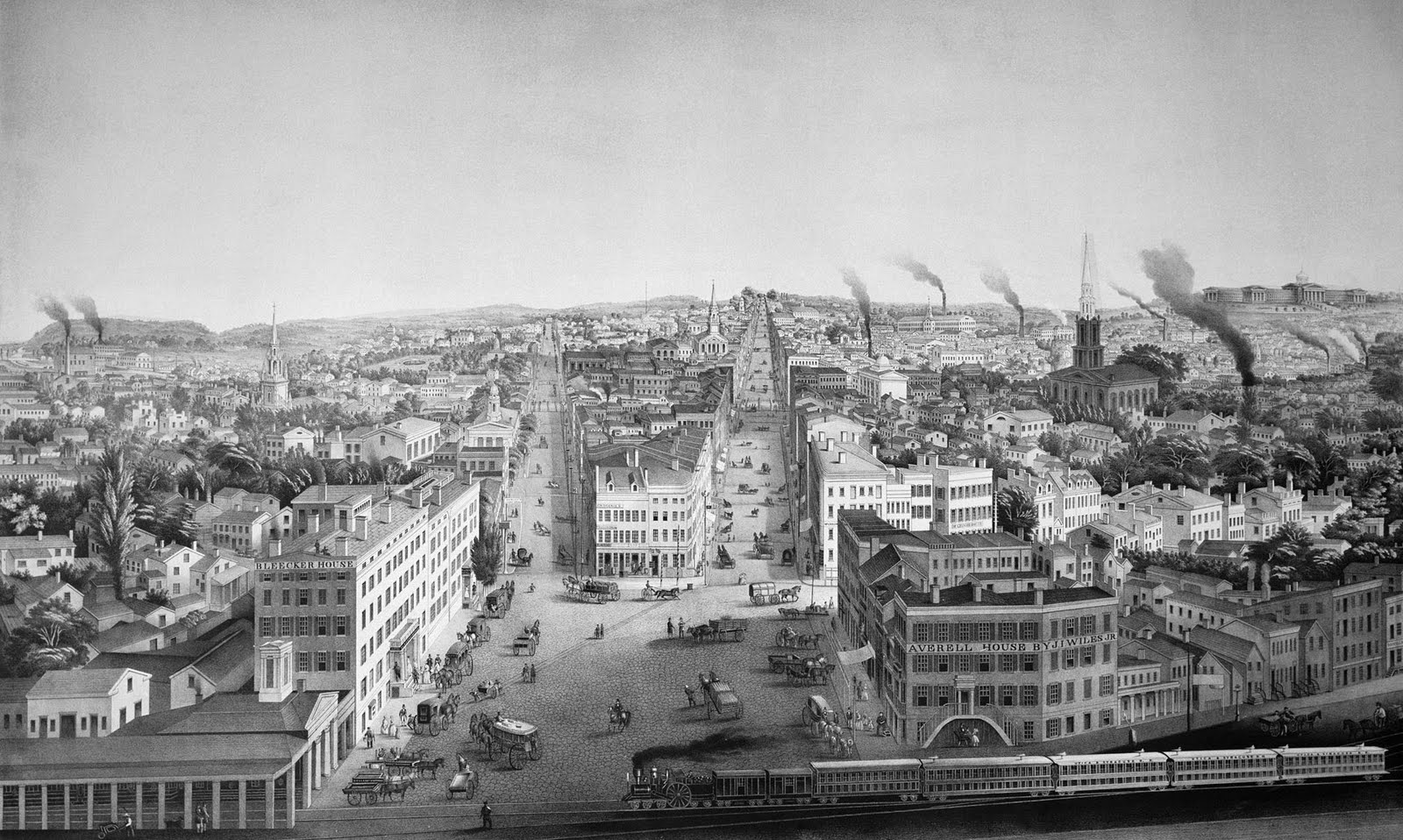
Bird's-eye view of Utica over Bagg's Square in the 1850s, showing the smoke from numerous factory chimneys

Utica's location on the Erie and Chenango canals encouraged industrial development, allowing the transport of anthracite coal from northeastern Pennsylvania for local manufacturing and distribution. Utica's economy centered on the manufacture of furniture, heavy machinery, textiles and lumber. The combined effects of the Embargo Act of 1807 and local investment enabled further expansion of the textile industry.

In addition to the canals, transport in Utica was bolstered by railroads running through the city. The first was the Mohawk and Hudson Rail Road, which became the Utica and Schenectady Railroad in 1833. Its 78 mi (126 km) connection between Schenectady and Utica was developed in 1836 from the right-of-way previously used by the Mohawk and Hudson railroad. Later lines, such as the Syracuse and Utica Railroad, merged with the Utica and Schenectady to form the New York Central Railroad, which originated as a 19th-century forest railway of the Adirondacks.

In the early 1800s, William Williams and his partner published Utica's first newspaper, The Utica Club, from their printing shop on Genesee Street. In 1817 Williams also published Utica's first directory. Utica went on to become a printing and publishing center, with many newspapers.

=== Abolitionism ===
During the 1850s, Utica aided more than 650 fugitive slaves; it played a major role as a station in the Underground Railroad. The city was on a slave escape route from the Southern Tier to Canada by way of Albany, Syracuse, or Rochester. The route, used by Harriet Tubman to travel to Buffalo, guided slaves to pass through Utica on the New York Central Railroad right-of-way en route to Canada. Utica was the locus for Methodist preacher Orange Scott's antislavery sermons during the 1830s and 1840s, and Scott formed an abolitionist group there in 1843. Beriah Green organized the 1835 initial meeting of the New York State Anti-Slavery Society in Utica, which was disrupted by an anti-abolitionist mob led by local congressman Samuel Beardsley and other "prominent citizens". (It adjourned to Gerrit Smith's home in nearby Peterboro, New York.) This mob was part of a national campaign of anti-abolitionist violence in the 1830s.

=== 20th century ===
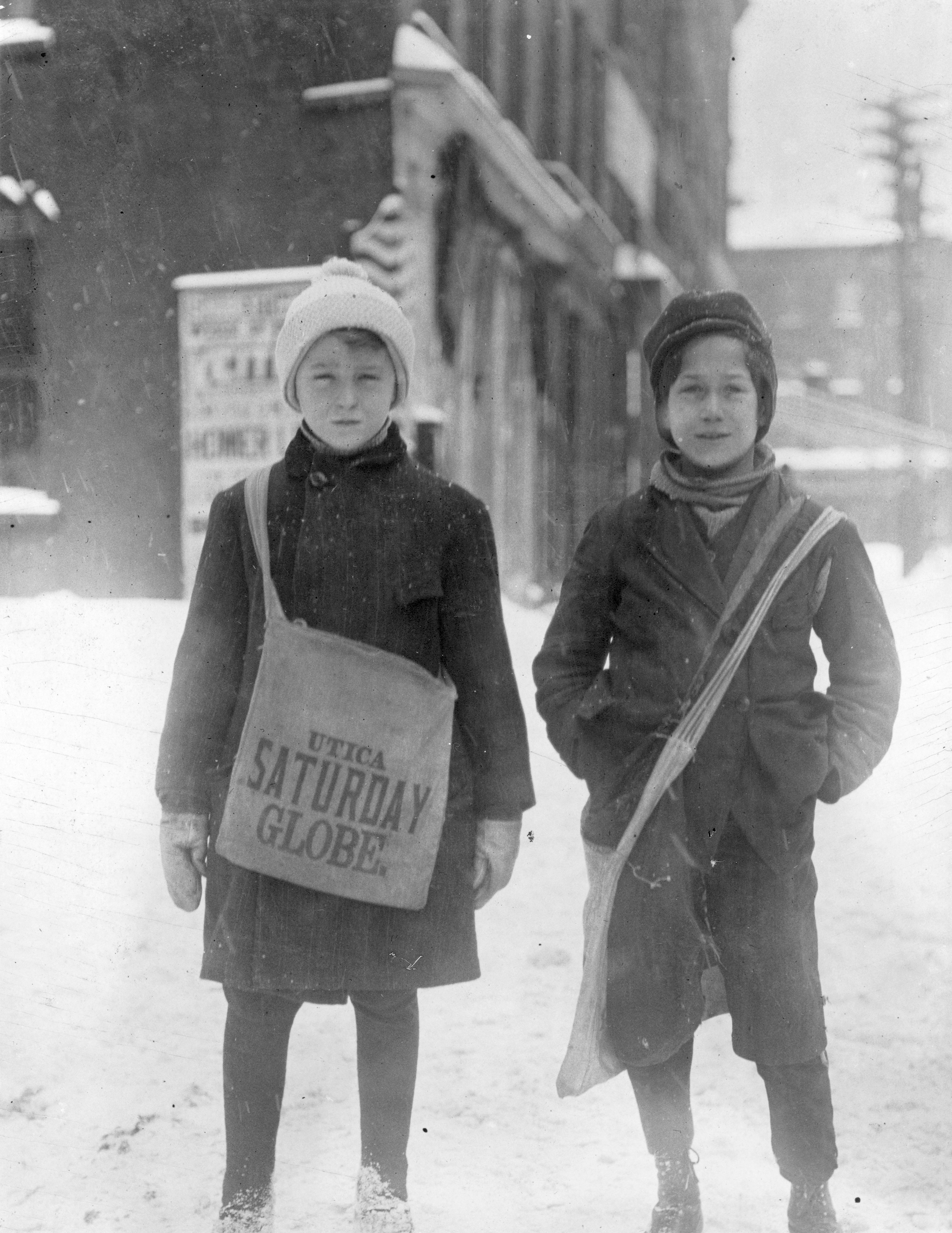
Newsboys for the Utica Saturday Globe, 1910. Photo by Lewis Hine.

The early 20th century brought rail advances to Utica, with the New York Central electrifying 49 mi (79 km) of track from the city to Syracuse in 1907 for its West Shore interurban line. In 1902, the Utica and Mohawk Valley Railway connected Rome to Little Falls with a 37.5 mi (60.4 km) electrified line through Utica.

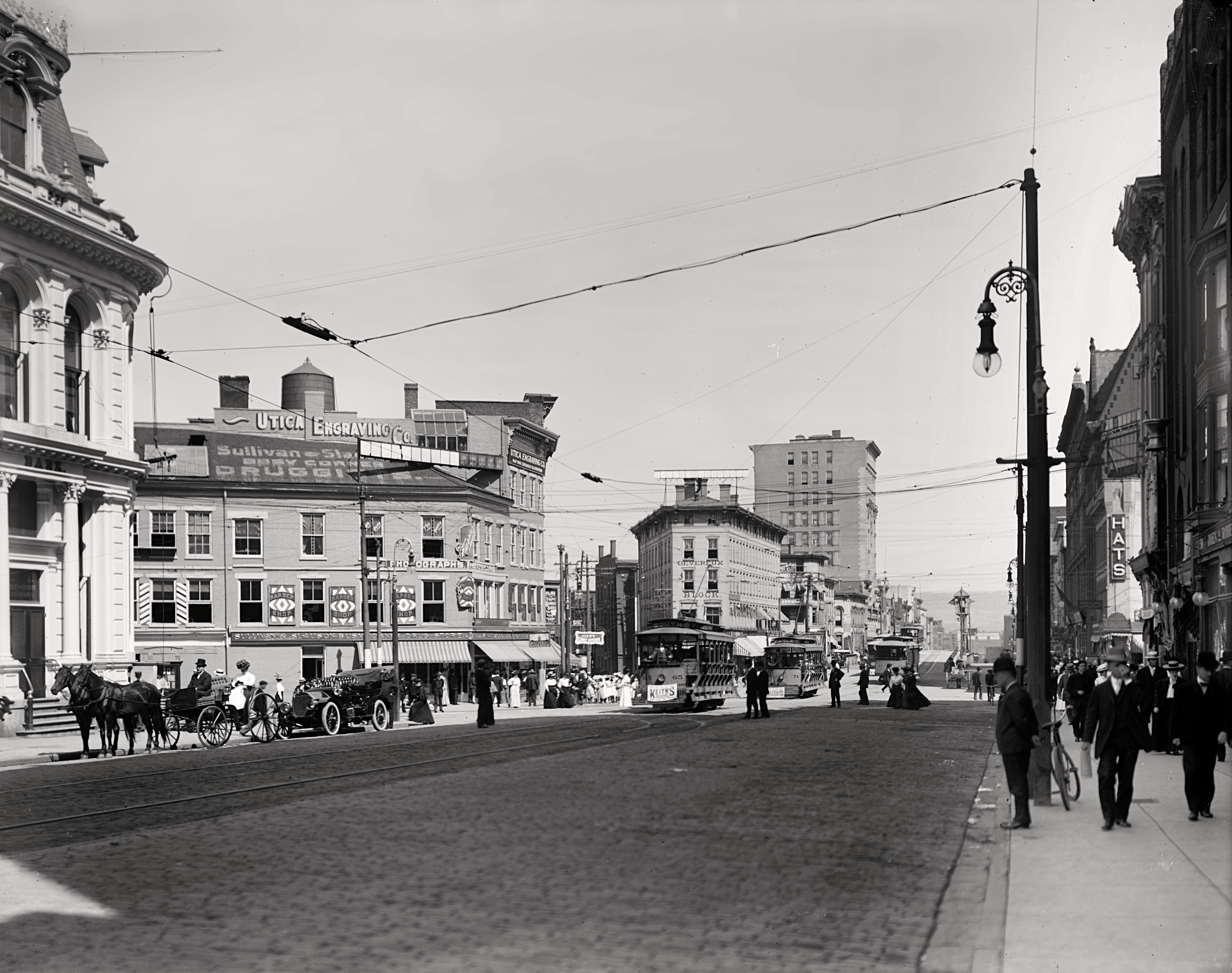
Looking north towards the corner of Genesee and Bleecker streets, c. 1900–1915. Streetcars can be seen crossing a bridge over the Erie Canal.

Waves of Lebanese Maronite, Italian, Irish, and Polish immigrants worked in the city's industries in the early part of the 20th century. Like many other industrial centers, labor unrest affected Utica in the 1910s; on April 5, 1912 martial law was proclaimed to stop riots in Utica, Yorkville, and New York Mills, while on October 28 during the strike wave of 1919, city police shot six or more striking textile workers. In 1919, two-thirds of employed Uticans worked in the textile industry. The textile industry in the Northern United States declined rapidly following World War I, as mills relocated to the Southern United States. Textiles remained the leading industry in Utica through 1947, with the few remaining mills employing a little less than a quarter of the city's workers.

As early as 1928, the area Chamber of Commerce sought to diversify Utica's industrial base. Prompted by local labor issues and national trends, the Republican political machine in Utica declined and was replaced by a Democratic machine headed by Rufus Elefante with the support of Governor (and later, President) Franklin D. Roosevelt. Democratic political leaders cooperated with local business interests to draw modern industry to Utica. General Electric, Chicago Pneumatic, Bendix Aviation, and Univac among others established factories in Utica. Utica College and Mohawk Valley Community College were founded to provide skilled workers, and Oneida County Airport was built to provide transport. The city also underwent residential redevelopment, including slum clearance and modernizing streets and neighborhoods to accommodate the automobile. The period of Utica history through the 1940s and 1950s is sometimes called the "loom to boom" era. While it led to growth of the suburbs of New Hartford and Whitestown, Utica's population remained flat during this era, and unemployment was persistently elevated.

As in some other US cities during the decade, scandals involving political corruption, vice, and organized crime tarnished Utica's reputation. Organized crime in Utica received national attention after three Utican mafiosos were reported to have attended the Apalachin meeting of American Mafia leaders in 1957. The New York Journal American dubbed Utica the "Sin City of the East", and reporting from sources like the Journal American and Newsweek gave Utica a national reputation for Mafia activities. Local business interests, as well as other media sources such as Look magazine, asserted that these reports were exaggerated, and corruption and crime in Utica were no worse than that in similar American cities. In 1959, the scandals culminated in criminal investigations of city employees and officials: many were arrested on charges related to prostitution, gambling, fraud, and conspiracy, and others were forced to resign. The Utica Daily Press and Utica Observer-Dispatch were awarded the 1959 Pulitzer Prize for Public Service for their investigations of local corruption. Elefante's machine lost dominance. Organized crime in Utica was curtailed, but resurged in the late 1970s. The local Mafia, present since the 1930s, ended with the indictment of local associates of the Buffalo crime family in 1989.

Strongly affected by the deindustrialization that took place in other Rust Belt cities, Utica suffered a major reduction in manufacturing activity during the second half of the 20th century. The remaining textile mills continued to be undercut by competitors in the South. The 1954 opening of the New York State Thruway (which bypassed the city) and declines in activity on the Erie Canal and railroads throughout the United States also contributed to a poor local economy. During the 1980s and 1990s, major employers such as General Electric and Lockheed Martin closed plants in Utica and Syracuse. Some Utica businesses relocated to nearby Syracuse, with its larger and more educated workforce. Utica's population fell while population in the county increased, reflecting a statewide trend of decreasing urban populations outside New York City. Eccentric populist mayor Ed Hanna, who served from 1974 to 1978 and from 1996 to 2000, brought himself national media attention but was unable to stem Utica's decline.

=== 21st century ===
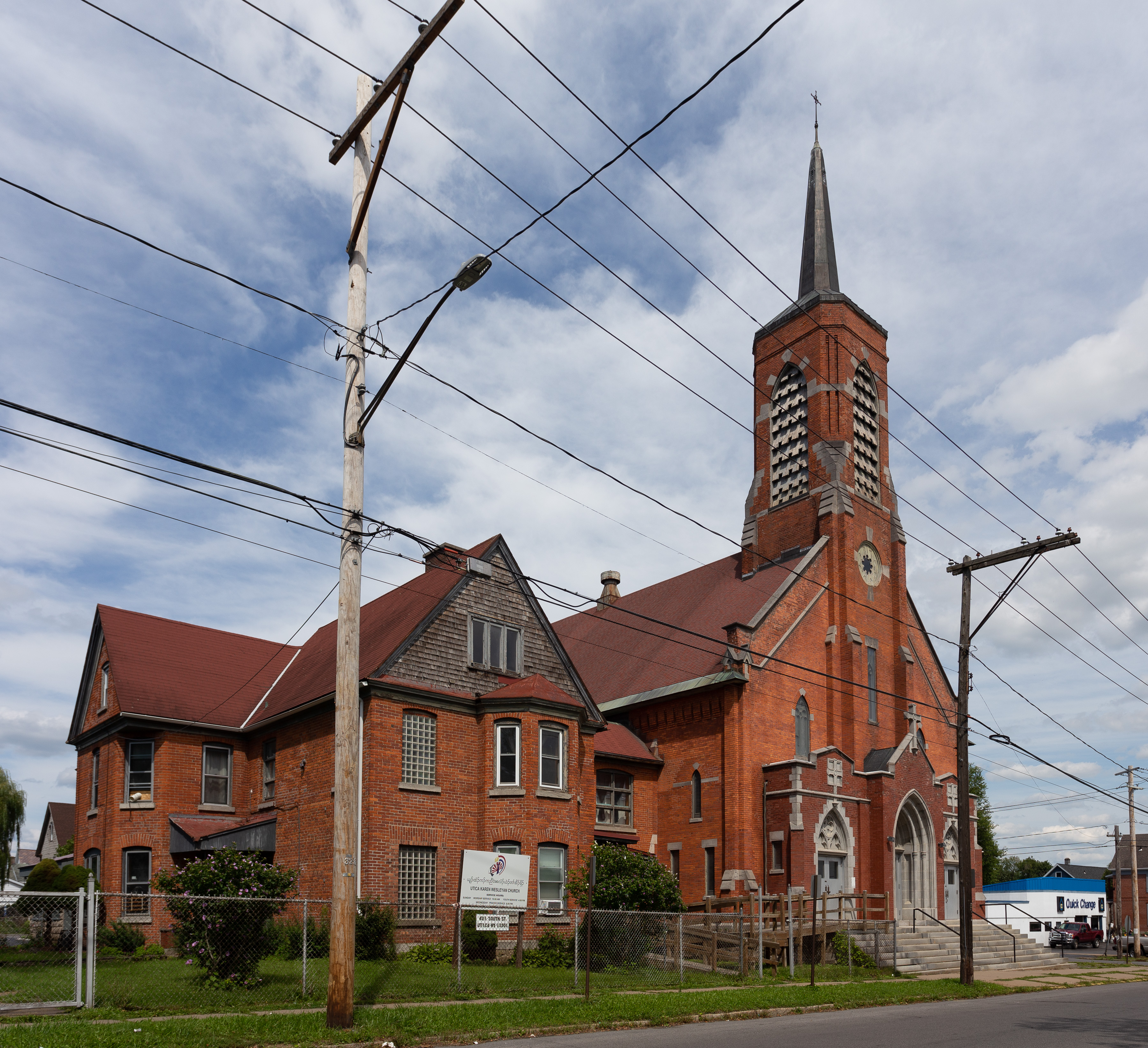
Karen refugees from Myanmar established a Wesleyan Church on South Street.

The low cost of living in Utica has attracted immigrants and refugees from around the world. The largest refugee groups in Utica are Bosnians, with 4,500 refugees resettled following the Bosnian War, and the Karen people of Myanmar, with about 4,000 resettled. Utica also has sizable communities of refugees from the former Soviet Union, Southeast Asia, Africa, the Middle East, and elsewhere. Between 2005 and 2010, Utica's population increased for the first time in decades, largely because of refugee resettlement. In 2015, about one quarter of the population of Utica were refugees, and 43 languages were spoken in city schools. The United Nations High Commissioner for Refugees described Utica as the "town that loves refugees" in 2005, although issues of discrimination still occur. In 2016, the Utica City School District settled lawsuits alleging refugee students were excluded from attending high school. In 2024, 13-year-old Karen refugee Nyah Mway was shot and killed by police, making national news. Immigration raids throughout 2025 and 2026 have also raised tensions.

Utica continues to struggle with a high rate of poverty and a shrunken tax base, adversely affecting schools and public services. Local, regional and statewide economic efforts have been proposed to revitalize the area economy. In 2010 the city developed its first comprehensive master plan in more than a half-century. After a decade of delays and false starts, plans to create a nanotechnology center in the area came to fruition when semiconductor manufacturer Wolfspeed opened a plant in Marcy just north of Utica in 2022. In October 2023, a new hospital in downtown Utica opened, replacing Utica's two existing hospitals.

== Geography ==
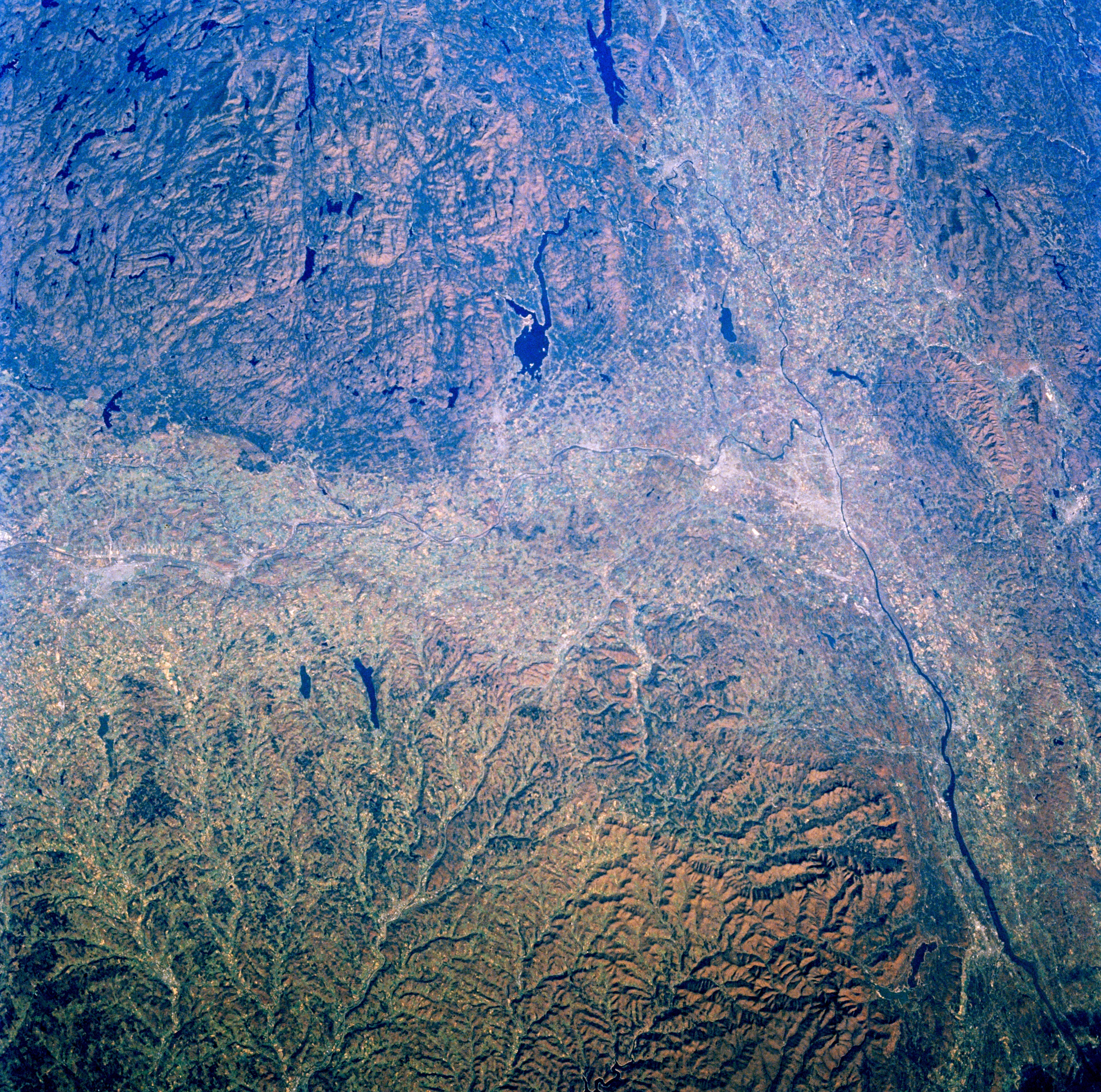
November 1985 photo of the Mohawk Valley from Space Shuttle Challenger, with Utica center-left and Albany center-right

According to the United States Census Bureau, Utica has a total area of 17.02 sq mi (44.1 km^{2})—16.76 sq mi (43.4 km^{2}) of land and 0.26 sq mi (0.67 km^{2}) (1.52 percent) of water. The city is located at New York's geographic center, adjacent to the western border of Herkimer County, and at the southwestern base of the Adirondack Mountains. Utica and its suburbs are bound by the Allegheny Plateau in the south and the Adirondack Mountains in the north, and the city is 456 ft (139 m) above sea level; this region is known as the Mohawk Valley. The city is 90 mi (145 km) west-northwest of Albany and 45 mi (72 km) east of Syracuse.

=== Topography ===
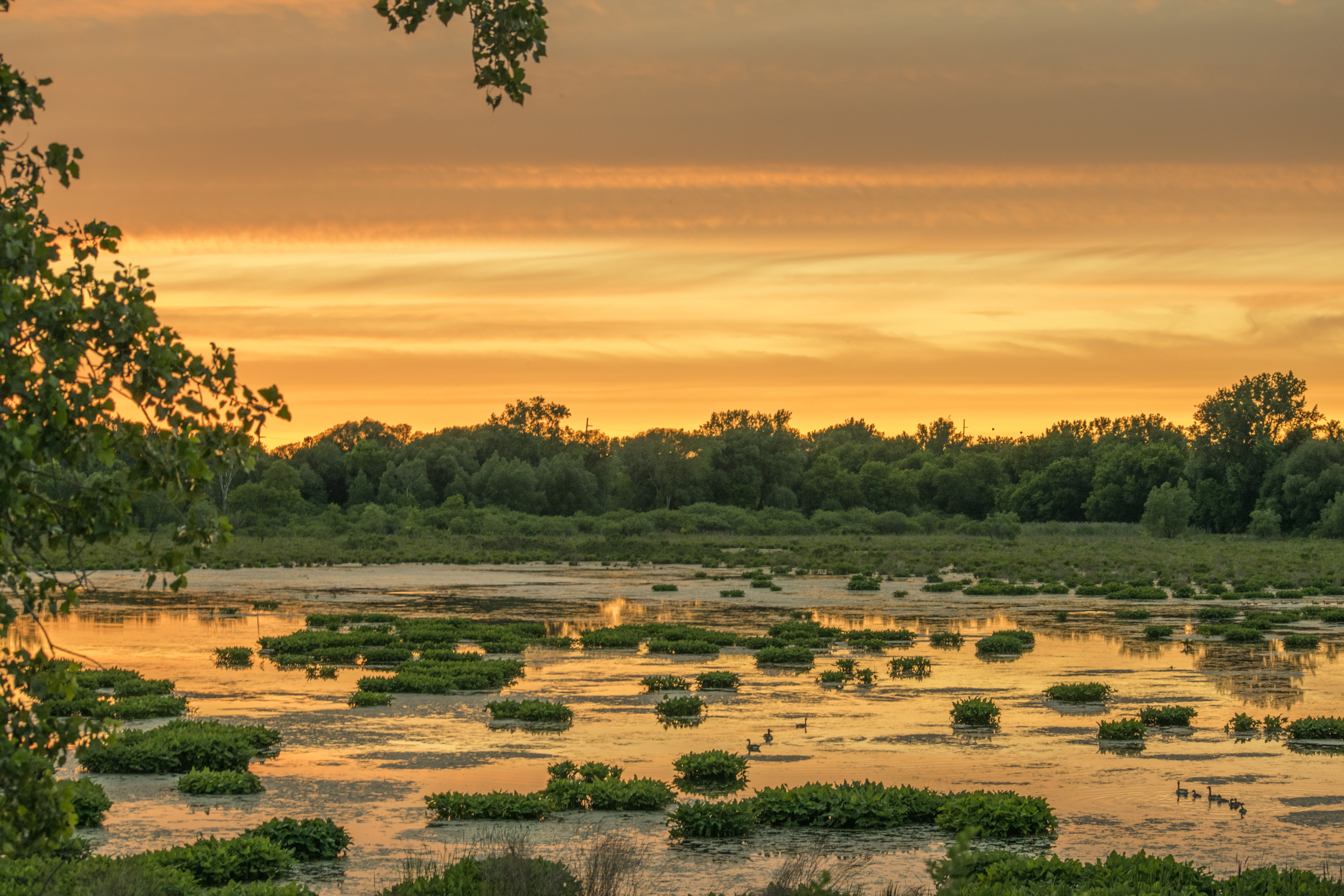
The Utica Marsh is a series of wetlands along the Mohawk River.

The city's Mohawk name, Unundadages ("around the hill"), refers to a bend in the Mohawk River that flows around the city's elevated position as seen from the Deerfield Hills in the north. The Erie Canal and Mohawk River pass through northern Utica; northwest of downtown is the Utica Marsh, a group of cattail wetlands between the Erie Canal and Mohawk River (partially in the town of Marcy) with a variety of animals, plants and birds. During the 1850s, plank roads were built through the marshland surrounding the city. Utica's suburbs have more hills and cliffs than the city. Located where the Mohawk Valley forms a wide floodplain, the city has a generally sloping, flat topography.

=== Cityscape ===
Utica's architecture features many styles that are also visible in comparable areas of Buffalo, Rochester and Syracuse, including Greek Revival, Italianate, French Renaissance, Gothic Revival and Neoclassical. The modernist 1972 Utica State Office Building, at 17 floors and 227 ft (69 m), is the city's tallest.

Streets laid out when Utica was a village had more irregularities than those built later in the 19th and 20th centuries. As a result of the city's location (adjacent to the Mohawk River), many streets parallel the river, so they do not run strictly east–west or north–south. Remnants of Utica's early electric-rail systems can be seen in the West and South neighborhoods, where the rails were set into the streets.

=== Neighborhoods ===
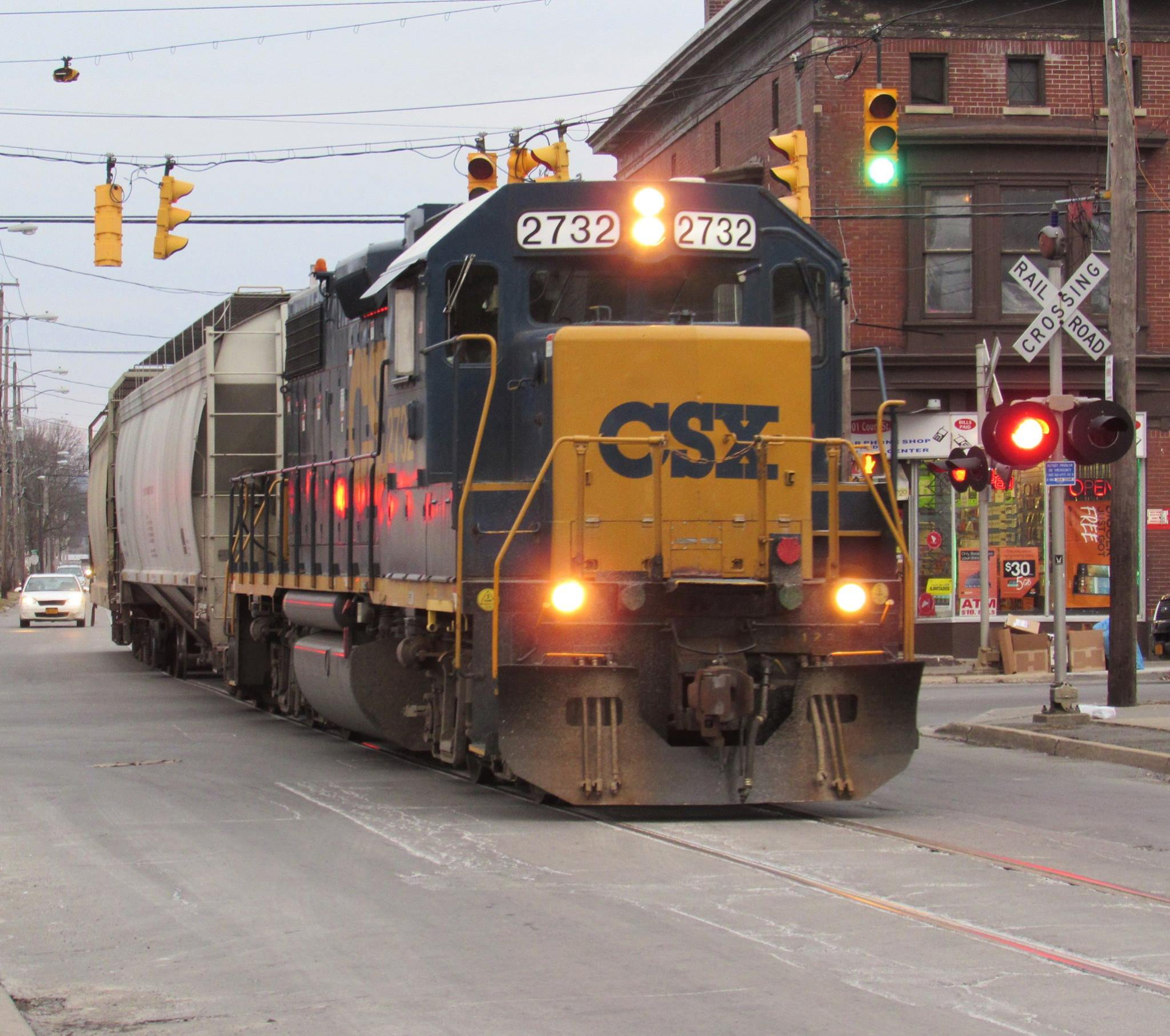
A CSX train sharing Schuyler Street in West Utica

Utica's neighborhoods have historically been defined by their residents, allowing them to develop their own individuality. Racial and ethnic groups, social and economic separation and the development of infrastructure and new means of transportation have shaped neighborhoods, with groups shifting between them as a result.

West Utica (or the West Side) was historically home to German, Irish and Polish immigrants. The Corn Hill neighborhood in the city center had a significant Jewish population. East Utica (or the East Side) is a cultural and political center dominated by Italian immigrants. North of downtown is the Triangle neighborhood, formerly home to the city's African-American and Jewish populations. Neighborhoods formerly dominated by one or more groups saw other groups arrive, such as Bosnians and Latin Americans in former Italian neighborhoods and the historically Welsh neighborhood of Corn Hill. Bagg Commemorative Park and Bagg's Square West (Utica's historic centers) are in the northeastern portion of downtown, with Genesee Street on the west and Oriskany Street on the south.

=== Historic places ===
The following are listed on the National Register of Historic Places:

- Alexander Pirnie Federal Building
- Byington Mill (Frisbie & Stansfield Knitting Company)
- Calvary Episcopal Church
- Roscoe Conkling House
- Doyle Hardware Building
- First Baptist Church of Deerfield
- First Presbyterian Church
- Fort Schuyler Club Building
- Globe Woolen Company Mills
- Grace Church
- John C. Hieber Building
- Hurd & Fitzgerald Building
- Lower Genesee Street Historic District
- Memorial Church of the Holy Cross
- Millar-Wheeler House
- Munson-Williams-Proctor Arts Institute
- New Century Club
- Rutger-Steuben Park Historic District
- St. Joseph's Church
- Stanley Theater
- Tabernacle Baptist Church
- Union Station
- Uptown Theatre
- Utica Armory
- Utica Daily Press Building
- Utica Parks and Parkway Historic District
- Utica Psychiatric Center
- Utica Public Library
- Gen. John G. Weaver House
- Forest Hill Cemetery

=== Climate ===
Utica has a humid continental climate (or warm-summer climate: Köppen Dfb) with four distinct seasons, characterized by cold winters and temperate summers. Summer high temperatures range from 77–81 °F (25–27 °C). The city is in USDA plant hardiness zone 5b, and native vegetation can tolerate temperatures from −10 to −15 °F (−23 to −26 °C).

Winters are cold and snowy; Utica receives lake-effect snow from Lake Erie and Lake Ontario. Utica is colder on average than other Great Lakes cities because of its location in a valley and susceptibility to north winds; temperatures in the single digits or below zero Fahrenheit are not uncommon on winter nights. Annual precipitation (based on a 30-year average from 1981 to 2010) is 45.7 in (116 cm), falling on an average of 175 days.

Climate data for Utica (Rome, New York), 1991–2020 normals, (Note: Humidity data calculated from the averages of morning and evening relative humidities.) (Note: Mean monthly maxima and minima (i.e. the expected highest and lowest temperature readings at any point during the year or given month) calculated based on data at said location from 1991 to 2020) extremes 1893–present
Month	Jan	Feb	Mar	Apr	May	Jun	Jul	Aug	Sep	Oct	Nov	Dec	Year
Record high °F (°C)	67 (19)	72 (22)	83 (28)	91 (33)	95 (35)	99 (37)	100 (38)	97 (36)	100 (38)	89 (32)	79 (26)	71 (22)	100 (38)
Mean maximum °F (°C)	53.5 (11.9)	52.4 (11.3)	61.5 (16.4)	80.5 (26.9)	87.8 (31.0)	89.9 (32.2)	92.1 (33.4)	89.5 (31.9)	88.4 (31.3)	78.1 (25.6)	67.9 (19.9)	56.6 (13.7)	93.4 (34.1)
Mean daily maximum °F (°C)	30.1 (−1.1)	31.8 (−0.1)	41.0 (5.0)	54.9 (12.7)	68.9 (20.5)	76.2 (24.6)	80.9 (27.2)	79.3 (26.3)	72.0 (22.2)	58.9 (14.9)	46.8 (8.2)	35.7 (2.1)	56.4 (13.6)
Daily mean °F (°C)	21.5 (−5.8)	22.5 (−5.3)	31.7 (−0.2)	44.5 (6.9)	56.8 (13.8)	65.3 (18.5)	70.2 (21.2)	68.7 (20.4)	61.4 (16.3)	49.7 (9.8)	39.0 (3.9)	28.3 (−2.1)	46.6 (8.1)
Mean daily minimum °F (°C)	12.9 (−10.6)	13.2 (−10.4)	22.5 (−5.3)	34.1 (1.2)	44.7 (7.1)	54.5 (12.5)	59.5 (15.3)	58.1 (14.5)	50.9 (10.5)	40.5 (4.7)	31.2 (−0.4)	20.9 (−6.2)	36.9 (2.7)
Mean minimum °F (°C)	−14.2 (−25.7)	−8.8 (−22.7)	1.3 (−17.1)	19.2 (−7.1)	29.7 (−1.3)	40.7 (4.8)	48.3 (9.1)	47.0 (8.3)	36.6 (2.6)	26.2 (−3.2)	14.0 (−10.0)	0.1 (−17.7)	−16.2 (−26.8)
Record low °F (°C)	−31 (−35)	−28 (−33)	−27 (−33)	0 (−18)	22 (−6)	31 (−1)	41 (5)	35 (2)	27 (−3)	16 (−9)	−4 (−20)	−26 (−32)	−34 (−37)
Average precipitation inches (mm)	2.50 (64)	2.37 (60)	3.43 (87)	3.72 (94)	4.46 (113)	4.20 (107)	4.25 (108)	3.60 (91)	3.95 (100)	4.67 (119)	3.72 (94)	2.95 (75)	43.82 (1,113)
Average snowfall inches (cm)	31.7 (81)	23.4 (59)	15.1 (38)	3.4 (8.6)	0.0 (0.0)	0.0 (0.0)	0.0 (0.0)	0.0 (0.0)	0.0 (0.0)	0.1 (0.25)	7.3 (19)	20.8 (53)	101.8 (259)
Average precipitation days (≥ 0.01 in)	12.9	14.2	13.2	15.5	14.9	14.0	13.1	13.7	13.4	17.1	15.7	17.0	174.7
Average snowy days (≥ 0.1 in)	15.9	11.7	8.2	2.8	0.0	0.0	0.0	0.0	0.0	0.4	4.2	13.5	56.7
Average relative humidity (%)	66.0	66.2	65.0	64.1	63.3	66.8	66.0	68.2	72.7	69.8	72.3	72.3	67.9
Percentage possible sunshine	42	46	52	58	64	66	65	60	54	48	43	40	53
Source 1: NOAA (snowfall 1981–2010), Western Regional Center
Source 2: Weatherbase

== Demographics ==
Utica, New York – Racial and ethnic composition Note: the US Census treats Hispanic/Latino as an ethnic category. This table excludes Latinos from the racial categories and assigns them to a separate category. Hispanics/Latinos may be of any race.
Race / Ethnicity (NH = Non-Hispanic)	Pop 2000	Pop 2010	Pop 2020	% 2000	% 2010	% 2020
White alone (NH)	46,389	40,164	34,236	76.49%	64.54%	52.44%
Black or African American alone (NH)	7,548	8,851	10,491	12.44%	14.22%	16.07%
Native American or Alaska Native alone (NH)	154	123	138	0.25%	0.20%	0.21%
Asian alone (NH)	1,331	4,594	8,210	2.19%	7.38%	12.58%
Pacific Islander alone (NH)	27	16	26	0.04%	0.03%	0.04%
Some Other Race alone (NH)	130	94	271	0.21%	0.15%	0.42%
Mixed race or Multiracial (NH)	1,562	1,838	2,885	2.58%	2.95%	44.2%
Hispanic or Latino (any race)	3,510	6,555	9,026	5.79%	10.53%	13.83%
Total	60,651	62,235	65,283	100.00%	100.00%	100.00%

Historical population
Census	Pop.	Note	%±
1820	2,972		—
1830	8,323		180.0%
1840	12,782		53.6%
1850	17,565		37.4%
1860	22,529		28.3%
1870	28,804		27.9%
1880	33,914		17.7%
1890	44,007		29.8%
1900	56,383		28.1%
1910	74,419		32.0%
1920	94,156		26.5%
1930	101,740		8.1%
1940	100,518		−1.2%
1950	100,489		0.0%
1960	100,410		−0.1%
1970	91,611		−8.8%
1980	75,632		−17.4%
1990	68,637		−9.2%
2000	60,523		−11.8%
2010	62,235		2.8%
2020	65,283		4.9%
2022 (est.)	64,081		−1.8%
U.S. Decennial Census

The city's growth during the 19th century is indicated by the increase in its population; in 1840 the United States Census ranked Utica as the 29th-largest in the country, with over 12,000 residents, more than the populations of Chicago, Detroit or Cleveland.

As of 2014, the city is the tenth-most populous in New York and the sixth-most populous metro region in New York. It is the seat of Oneida County, and a focal point of the six-county Mohawk Valley region. According to a U.S. Census estimate, the Utica–Rome Metropolitan Statistical Area decreased in population from 299,397 in 2010 to 296,615 on July 1, 2014, and its population density was about 3,818 people per square mile (1,474 people/km^{2}).

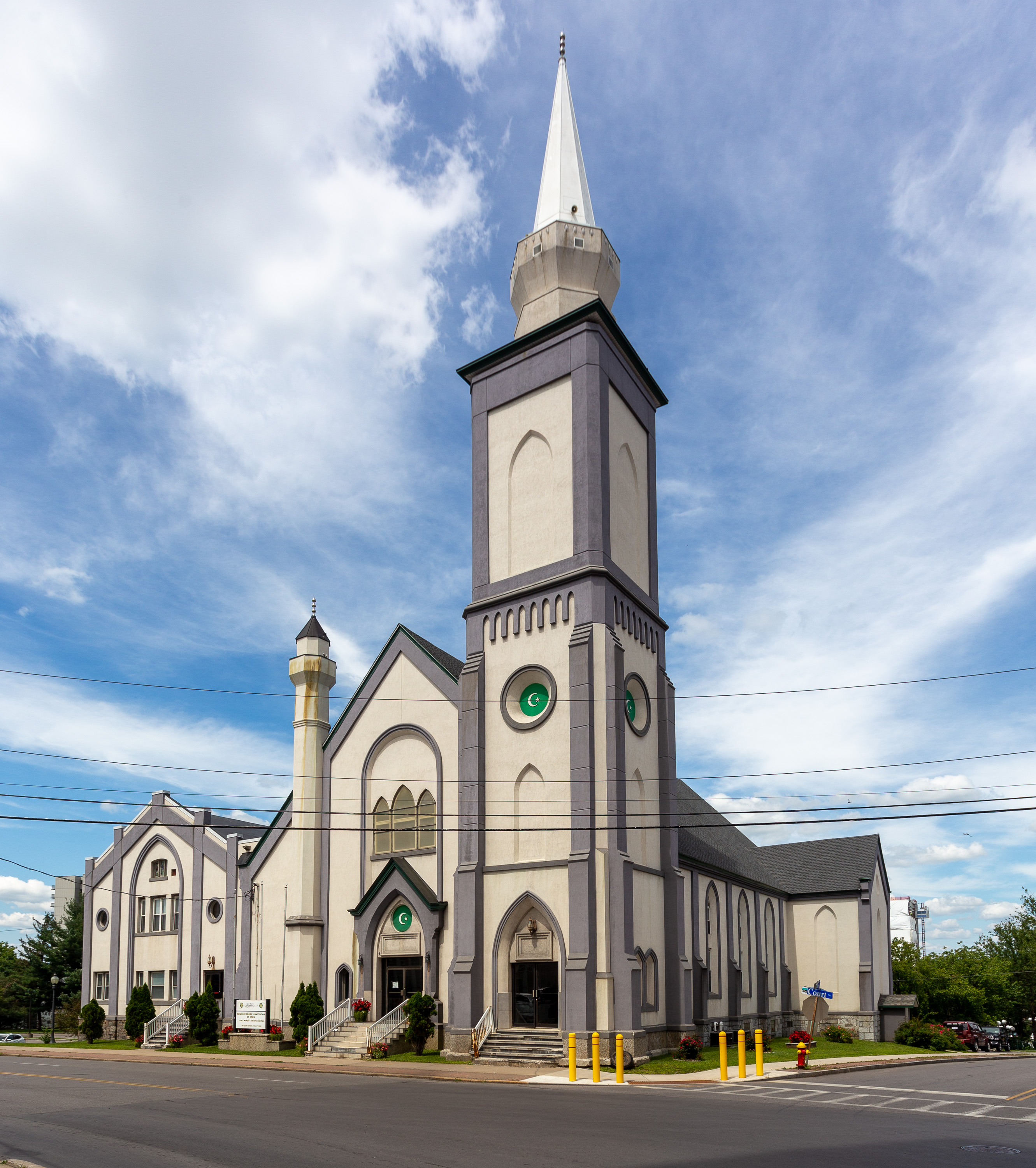
The Bosnian Islamic Association of Utica's mosque near City Hall

Utica's population has remained ethnically diverse and has received many new influxes of immigrants since the 1990s. New immigrants and refugees have included Bosnians displaced by the Bosnian War, Burmese, Karens, Latin Americans, Russians and Vietnamese. More than 42 languages are spoken in the city. Utica's population halted a forty-year decline in 2010, influenced by this influx of refugees and immigrants.

=== Racial and ethnic composition ===
According to the 2013 American Community Survey, the Italian American population has declined since its peak by more than 40%. Italian Americans however remain the most prominent ethnic group, constituting 20% of the city population. Utica is historically one of the most Italian cities in the country. Throughout the 20th century, the city had a higher concentration of Italian immigrants than other cities with notable levels of Italian immigration, such as New York City, Chicago, and Philadelphia. Italian immigrants from Basilicata were first to arrive, but most later immigrants came from the regions of Apulia, Lazio, Calabria, and Abruzzo, with an unusually large number from the village of Alberobello in Apulia. A smaller number came from Sicily than is typical for most Italian-American communities.

The remainder of sizable ethnic groups include, as approximations: Slavs (18%) broken down as Poles (8.3%), Bosnians (7%) and Eastern Slavs at a combined (2.7%). Irish (11.3%), African Americans (10.5%), German (10.3%), ethnically English or American residents (8%), Puerto Ricans (6.8%). Burmese (3.5%), French and French-Canadians (2.7%), Arabs and Lebanese (2%), (non-Hispanic) Caribbean West Indies (1.8%), Dominicans (1.5%), Vietnamese (1.5%) and Cambodians (.7%). Iroquois or other (non-Hispanic) Amerindians (.3%).

Racial composition	2020	2010	1990	1970	1950
White	55.3%	69.0%	86.7%	94.1%	98.4%
—Non-Hispanic	52.6%	64.5%	84.8%	91.2%	n/a
African American	17.3%	15.3%	10.5%	5.6%	1.6%
American Indians and Alaskan Natives	0.3%	0.3%	0.3%	0.2%	n/a
Asian	12.7%	7.2%	1.1%	0.1%	n/a
Other race	6.2%	3.9%	1.5%	0.1%	n/a
Two or more races	8.1%	4.0%	n/a	n/a	n/a
Hispanic or Latino (of any race)	13.8%	10.5%	3.4%	0.9% (Note: Population estimate from a 15-percent sample)	n/a

=== 2020 census ===
As of the 2020 census, Utica had a population of 65,283. The median age was 34.7 years. 25.3% of residents were under the age of 18 and 15.4% of residents were 65 years of age or older. For every 100 females there were 94.6 males, and for every 100 females age 18 and over there were 91.7 males age 18 and over.

100.0% of residents lived in urban areas, while 0.0% lived in rural areas.

There were 25,805 households in Utica, of which 29.9% had children under the age of 18 living in them. Of all households, 29.4% were married-couple households, 24.9% were households with a male householder and no spouse or partner present, and 36.6% were households with a female householder and no spouse or partner present. About 37.2% of all households were made up of individuals and 13.8% had someone living alone who was 65 years of age or older.

There were 28,980 housing units, of which 11.0% were vacant. The homeowner vacancy rate was 1.8% and the rental vacancy rate was 8.6%.

Racial composition as of the 2020 census
Race	Number	Percent
White	36,109	55.3%
Black or African American	11,298	17.3%
American Indian and Alaska Native	211	0.3%
Asian	8,266	12.7%
Native Hawaiian and Other Pacific Islander	38	0.1%
Some other race	4,051	6.2%
Two or more races	5,310	8.1%
Hispanic or Latino (of any race)	9,026	13.8%

=== Income ===
Median income per Utica household was $30,818. Per capita income was $17,653, and 29.6% of the population were below the poverty threshold.

== Economy ==
During the mid-19th century, Utica's canals and railroads supported industries producing furniture, locomotive headlights, steam gauges, firearms, textiles and lumber. World War I sparked the growth of Savage Arms, which produced the Lewis gun for the British Army, and the city prospered as one of the wealthiest per capita in the United States.

In the early 20th century, the local textile industry began to decline, which had a significant impact on the local economy. The boll weevil adversely affected Southern cotton crops in this period. During the late 1940s, air-conditioned mills opened in the southern United States, and jobs were lost as factories were moved south, where labor costs were lower because "right to work" laws weakened unions. Other industries also moved out of the city during a general restructuring in older industrial cities. New industries to rise in the city were electronics manufacturing (led by companies such as General Electric, which produced transistor radios), machinery and equipment, and food processing.

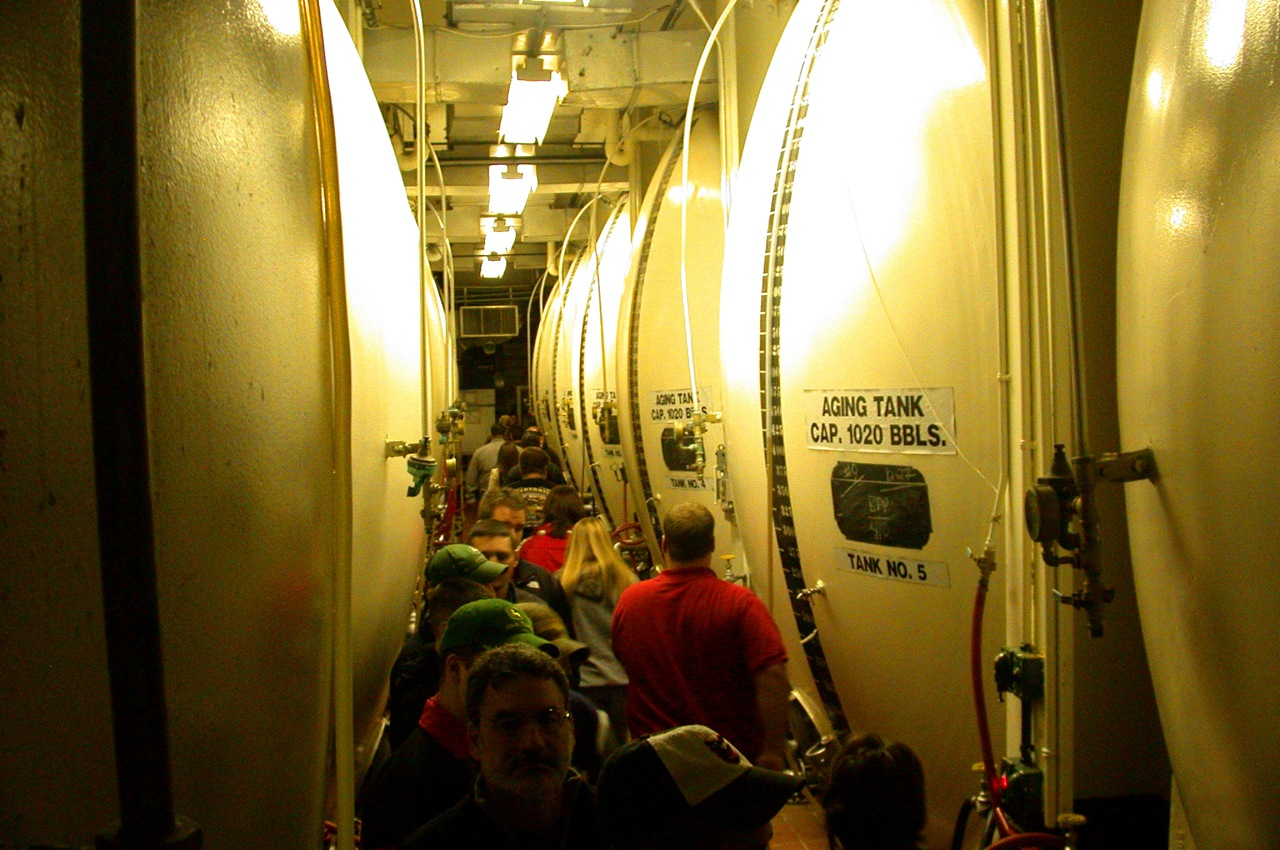
Fermentation tanks at the Matt Brewing Company in West Utica, producer of Saranac beer

The city struggled to make a transition to new industries. During the second half of the 20th century, the city's recessions were longer than the national average. The exodus of defense companies (such as Lockheed Martin, formed from the merger of the Lockheed Corporation and Martin Marietta in 1995) and the electrical-manufacturing industry played a major role in Utica's recent economic distress. From 1975 to 2001, the city's economic growth rate was similar to that of Buffalo, while other upstate New York cities such as Rochester and Binghamton outperformed both.

In the early 21st century, the Mohawk Valley economy is based on logistics, industrial processes, machinery, and industrial services. In Rome, the former Griffiss Air Force Base has remained a regional employer as a technology center. The Turning Stone Resort & Casino in Verona is a tourist destination, with a number of expansions during the 1990s and 2000s.

Utica's larger employers include the CONMED Corporation (a surgical-device and orthotics manufacturer) and the Mohawk Valley Health System, the city's primary health care system.

Construction, such as the North-South Arterial Highway project, supports the public-sector job market. Although passenger and commercial traffic on the Erie Canal has declined greatly since the 19th century, the barge canal still allows heavy cargo to travel through Utica at low cost, bypassing the New York State Thruway and providing intermodal freight transport with the railroads.

== Law, government, and politics ==
Utica, New York
- Crime rates* (2014)

Violent crimes
- Homicide: 6
- Rape: 22
- Robbery: 125
- Aggravated assault: 237
- Total violent crime: 390 ▲

Property crimes
- Burglary: 432
- Larceny-theft: 1,845
- Motor vehicle theft: 107
- Total property crime: 2,384 ▼
- Note: Reported crimes per 100,000 population Source: Utica City Police Department

Government

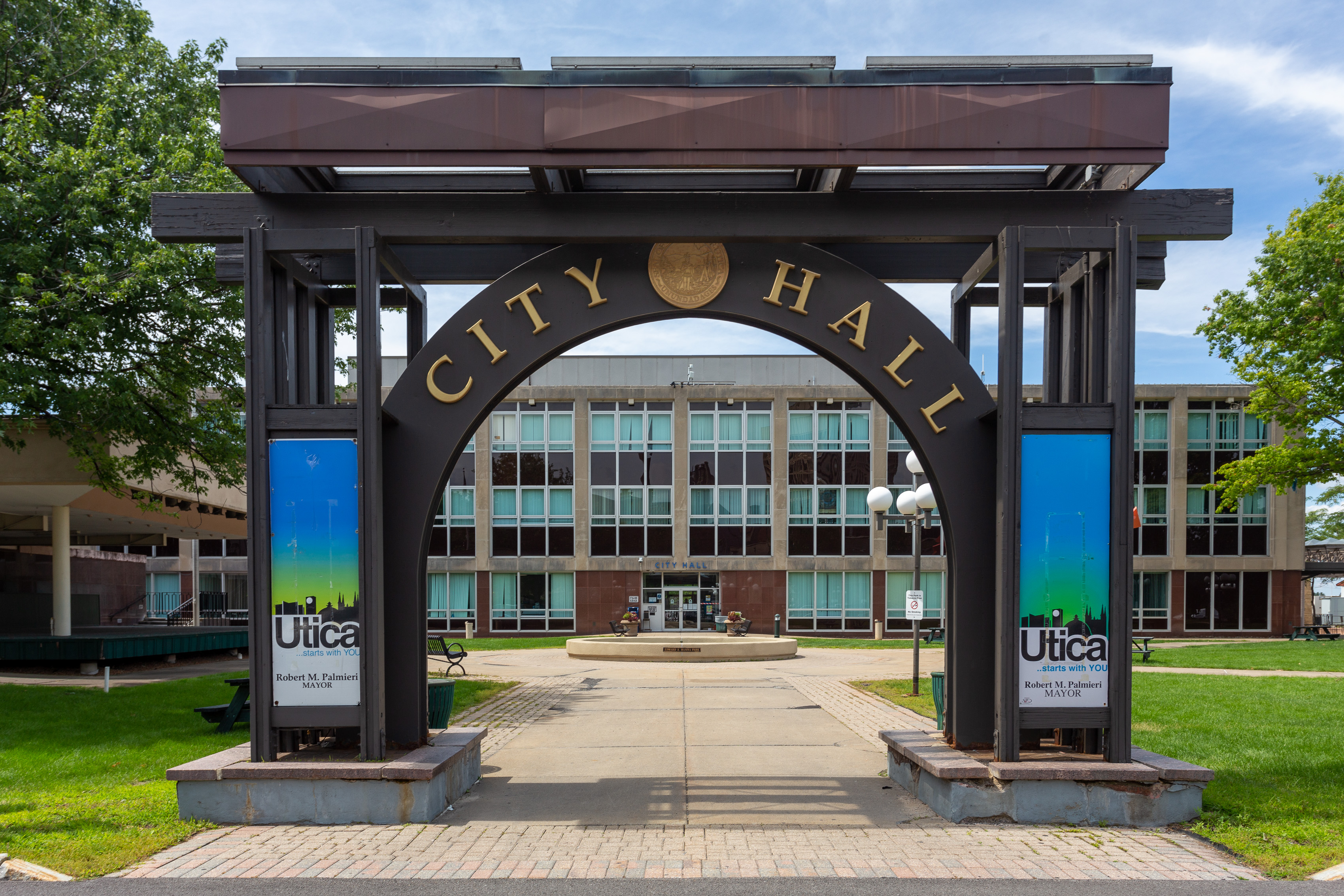
Utica City Hall

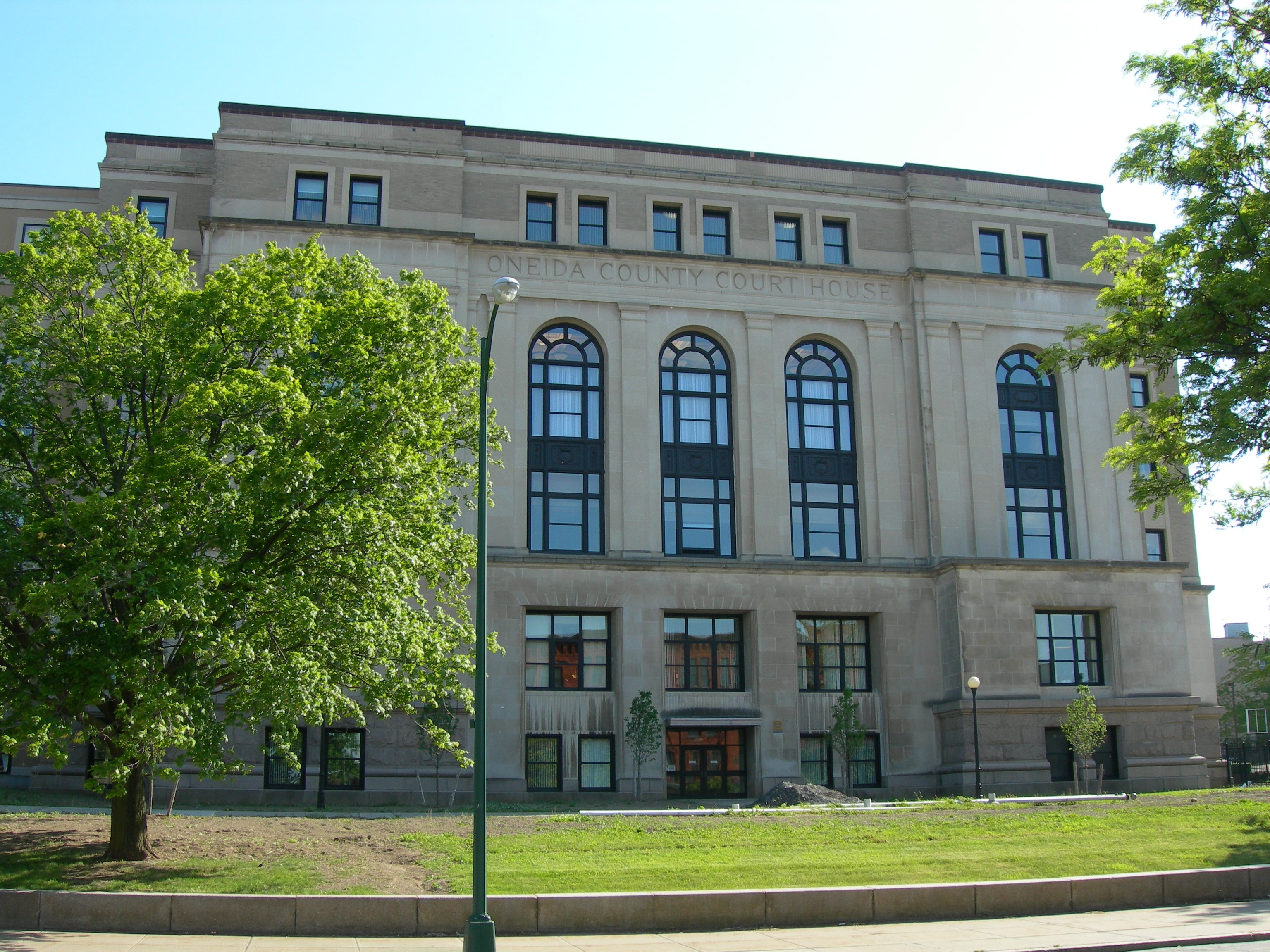
The United States District Court for the Northern District of New York has offices in the Alexander Pirnie Federal Building.

Republican Michael P. Galime was elected to a four-year term as mayor in 2023, and took office at the start of 2024. The common council consists of 10 members, six of whom are elected from single-member districts. The other four, including its president, are elected at-large. Utica has a Strong mayor-council form of government. The council has eight standing committees for issues including transportation, education, finance and public safety. There is a relative balance between the Democratic and Republican parties, a change from the predominantly single-party politics of the 20th century. Throughout the 1950s, Democrats held the mayor's office and a majority on the city council, under the control of Rufus Elefante's political machine.

Utica is in New York's 22nd congressional district, which has been represented by Democrat John Mannion since 2025. The city is served by the United States District Court for the Northern District of New York, with offices in the Alexander Pirnie Federal Building.

According to the comptroller's office, Utica's governmental expenses totaled $79.3 million (~$106 million in 2025) in 2014 (a net increase of $940,000 from the previous year). The 2015–16 budget proposes general-fund spending of $66.3 million (~$87.9 million in 2025). City taxes collected in 2014 were $25,972,930, with a tax rate per thousand of $25.24.

According to the city's police department, there were six murders, 125 robberies, 22 rapes, and 237 assaults in 2014 (an increase from the previous year, representing a violent-crime rate of 0.6 percent). There were 432 burglaries, 1,845 larcenies and 107 motor-vehicle thefts (a decrease from 2013, representing a property-crime rate of 3.8 percent). Compared to other cities in New York, Utica's crime rate is generally low. The Utica Police Department patrols the city, and law enforcement is also under the jurisdiction of the Oneida County Sheriff's Office and the New York State Police. The Utica Fire Department coordinates four engines, two truck companies, and rescue, HAZMAT and medical operations with a 123-person crew.

== Culture ==
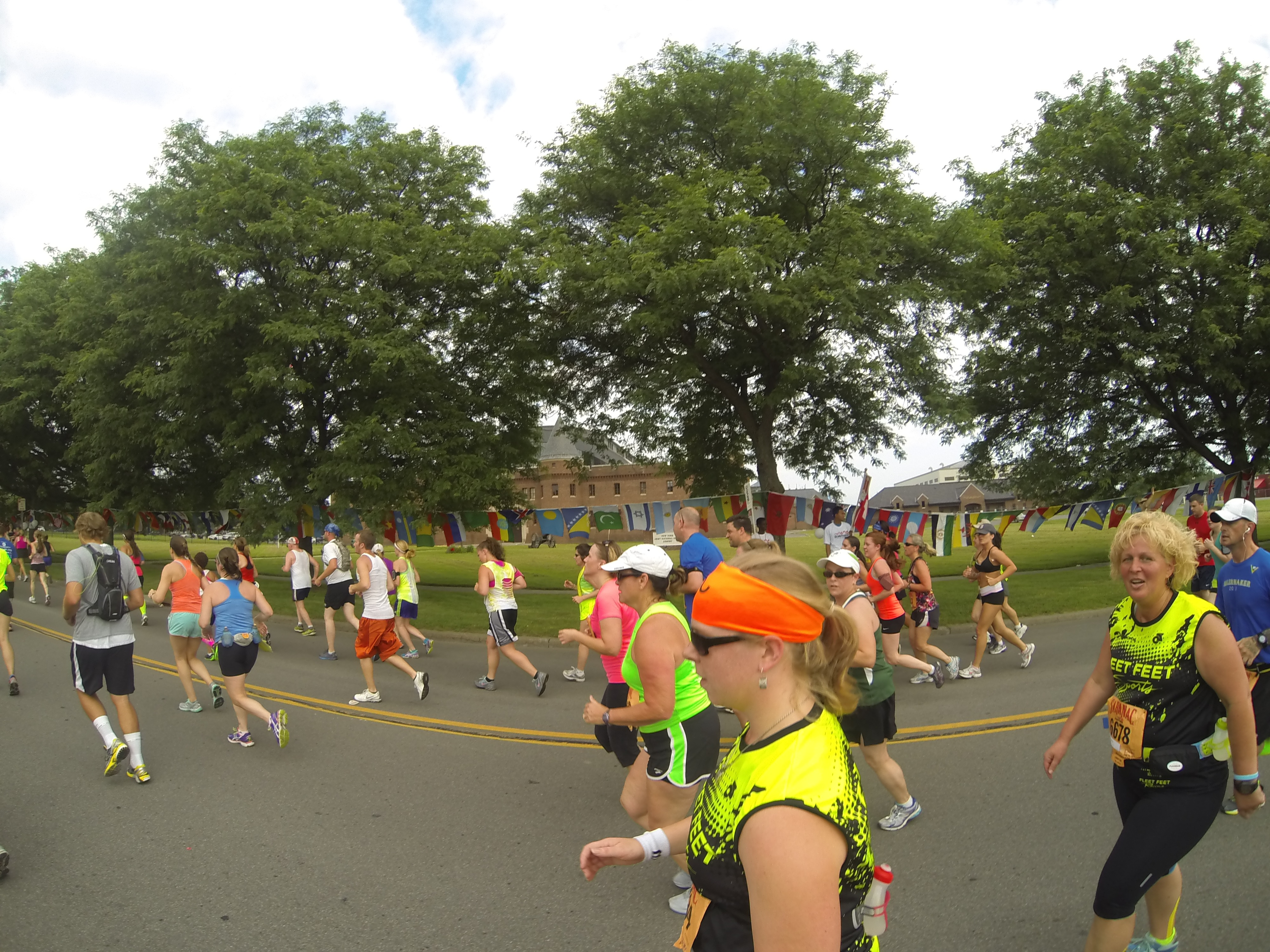
Participants in Utica's annual Boilermaker Road Race

Utica's position in the northeastern United States has allowed the blending of cultures and traditions. It shares characteristics with other cities in Central New York including its dialect group (Inland Northern American English, which is also present in other Rust Belt cities such as Buffalo, Elmira and Erie, Pennsylvania).

Utica shares a cuisine with the mid-Atlantic states, with local and regional influences. Its melting pot of immigrant and refugee cuisines, including Dutch, Italian, German, Irish and Bosnian, have introduced dishes such as ćevapi and pasticciotti (Note: Locally known as "pusties") to the community. Utica staple foods include chicken riggies, Utica greens, half-moons, Italian mushroom stew, and tomato pie. Other popular dishes are pierogi, penne alla vodka, and sausage and peppers. Utica has long had ties to the brewing industry. The family-owned Matt Brewing Company (Saranac Brewery) resisted the bankruptcies and plant closings that came with the industry consolidation under a few national brands. As of 2012, it was ranked the 15th-largest brewery by sales in the United States. The Brewers Association named the brewery among America's top 35 craft breweries in 2019.

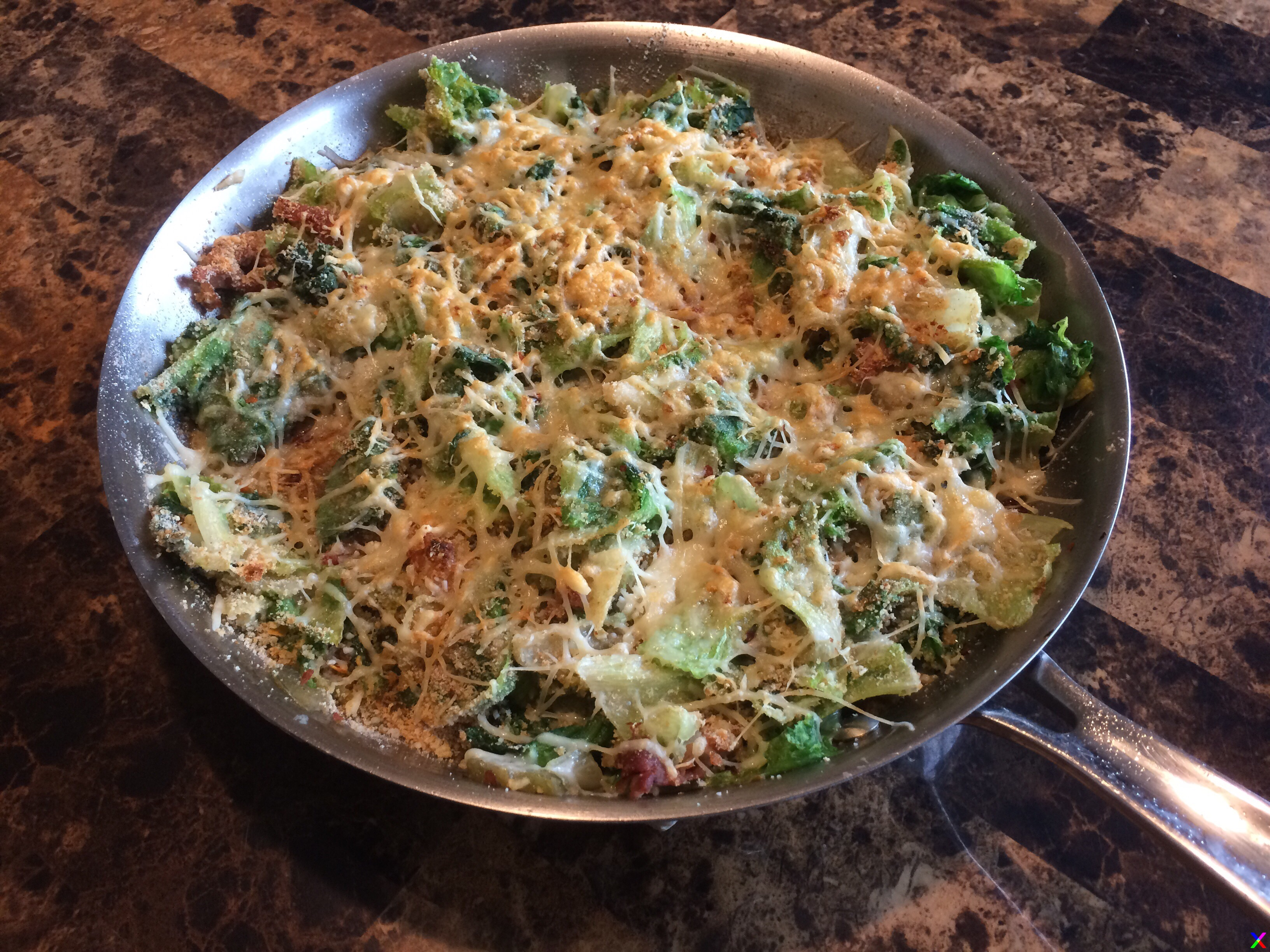
A skillet of Utica greens

The annual 15 km (9.3 mi) Boilermaker Road Race attracts runners from the region and around the world, including Kenya and Romania. The Children's Museum of Natural History, Science and Technology, next to Union Station, opened in 1963. In 2002, the museum partnered with NASA to feature space-related exhibits and events. The Munson-Williams-Proctor Arts Institute, founded in 1919, hosts rotating exhibits alongside its permanent collection. Since 1999, it is also home to the PrattMWP program in cooperation with the Pratt Institute.

The Utica Psychiatric Center is the site of a Greek Revival-style former insane asylum. The Utica crib, a restraining device frequently used at the asylum from the mid-19th century to 1887, was invented there. The Stanley Center for the Arts, a mid-sized concert and performance venue, was designed by Thomas W. Lamb in 1928 and today features theatrical and musical performances by local and touring groups. The Hotel Utica, designed by Esenwein & Johnson in 1912, became a nursing and residential-care facility during the 1970s. Notable guests had included Franklin D. Roosevelt, Judy Garland and Bobby Darin. It was restored as a hotel in 2001.

== Parks and recreation ==
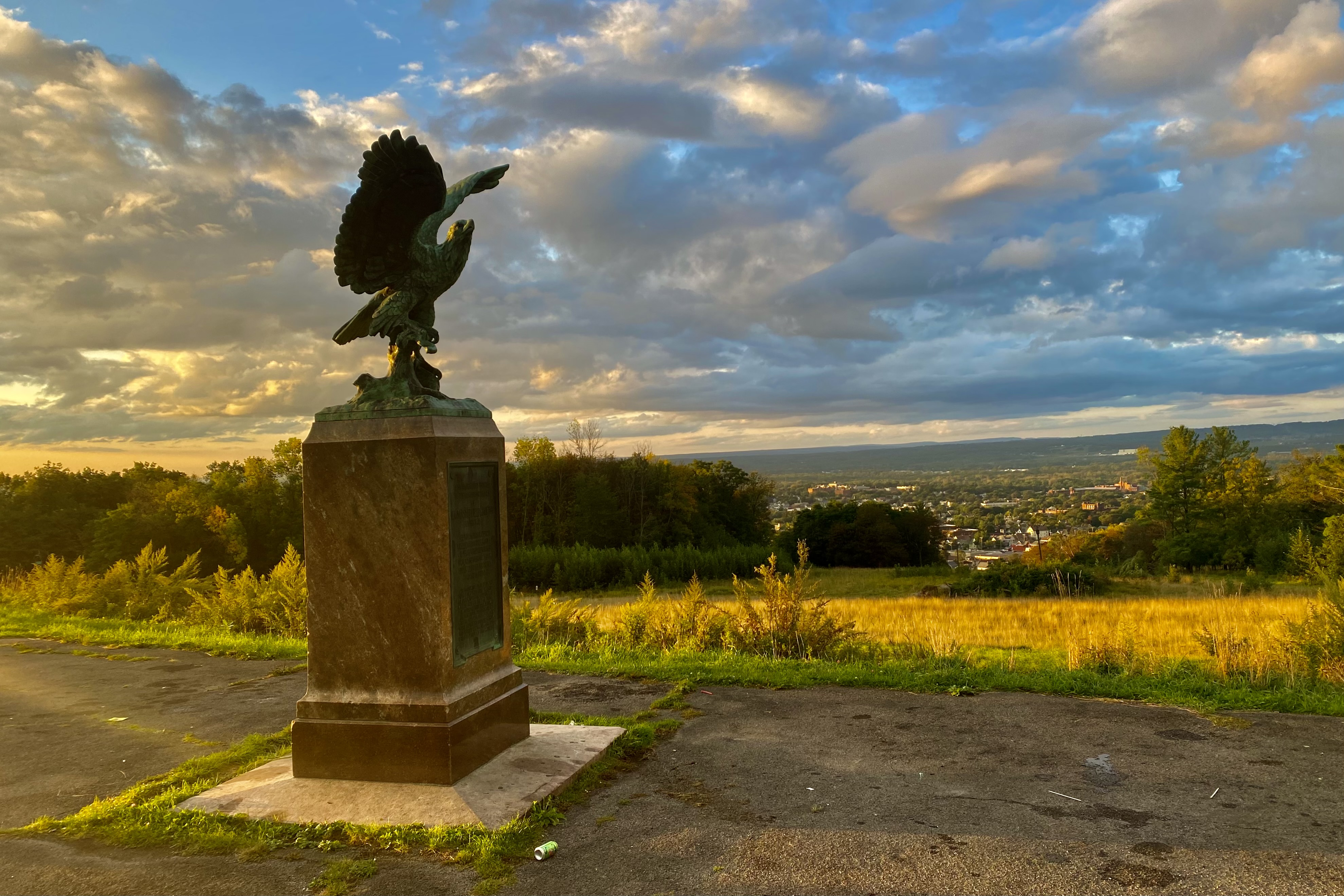
Roscoe Conkling Park

Utica's parks system consists of 677 acres (274 ha) of parks and recreation centers; most of the city's parks have community centers and swimming pools. Frederick Law Olmsted Jr., who designed New York City's Central Park and Delaware Park in Buffalo, designed the Utica Parks and Parkway Historic District. Olmsted also designed Memorial Parkway, a four mi (6.4 km) tree-lined boulevard connecting the district's parks and encircling the city's southern neighborhoods. The district includes Roscoe Conkling Park, the 62-acre F.T. Proctor Park, the Parkway, and T.R. Proctor Park.

The city's municipal golf course, Valley View (designed by golf-course architect Robert Trent Jones), is in the southern part of the city near the town of New Hartford. The Utica Zoo and the Val Bialas Ski Chalet, an urban ski slope featuring skiing, snowboarding, outdoor skating, and tubing, are also in south Utica in Roscoe Conkling Park. Smaller neighborhood parks in the district include Addison Miller Park, Chancellor Park, Pixley Park, Seymour Park, and Wankel Park.

The Utica Canal Terminal Harbor is connected to the Erie Canal and Mohawk River.

== Infrastructure ==
=== Transportation ===
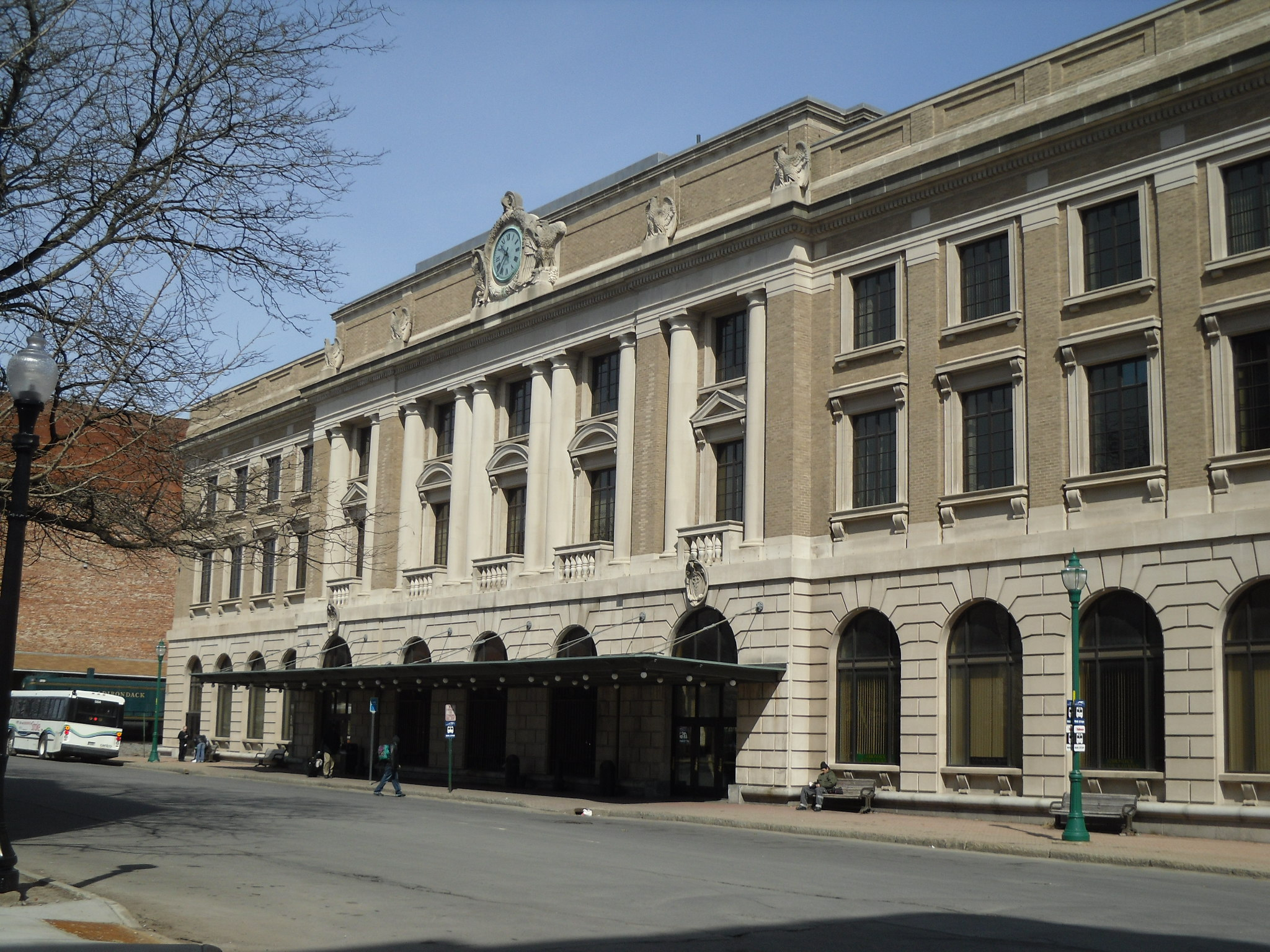
Union Station

Griffiss International Airport in Rome primarily serves military and general aviation, and Syracuse Hancock International Airport and Albany International Airport provide regional, domestic, and international passenger air travel in the greater area. Amtrak's Empire (two unnamed trains), Maple Leaf, and Lake Shore Limited trains stop at Utica's Union Station. Bus service is provided by the Central New York Regional Transportation Authority (CENTRO), a Syracuse public transport operator which runs 12 lines in Utica and has a downtown hub. Intercity bus service is provided by Greyhound Lines, Short Line, Adirondack Trailways, and Birnie Bus Service, with weekday and Saturday service to Syracuse; both stop at Union Station.

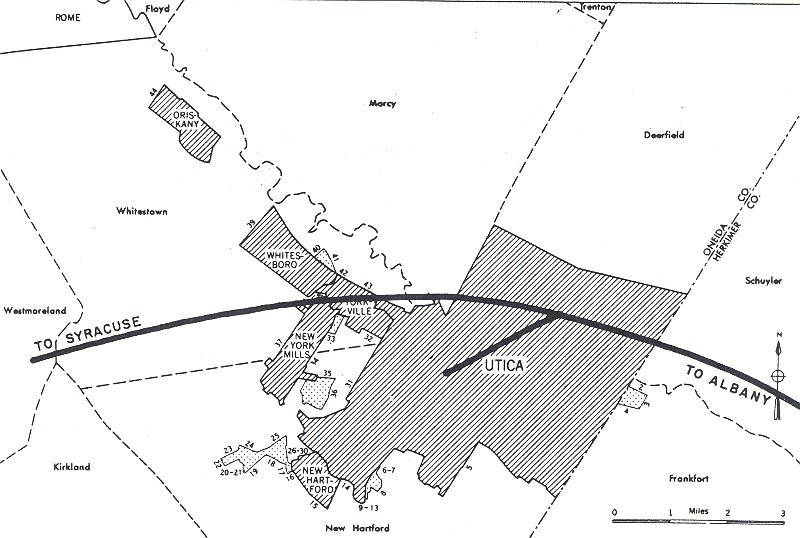
Early Federal Highway Administration map of the Interstate Highway System in Utica; Interstates 90 and 790 are in the shaded portion.

During the 1960s and 1970s, New York state planners envisioned a system of arterial roads in Utica that would include connections to Binghamton and Interstate 81. Due to community opposition, only parts of the highway project were completed, including the North–South Arterial Highway running through the city. Six New York State highways, one three-digit interstate highway, and one two-digit interstate highway pass through Utica. New York State Route 49 and State Route 840 are east–west expressways running along Utica's northern and southern borders, respectively, and the eastern terminus of each is in the city. New York State Route 5 and its alternate routes—State Route 5S and State Route 5A—are east–west roads and expressways that pass through Utica. The western terminus of Route 5S and the eastern terminus of Route 5A are both in the city. With Route 5 and Interstate 790 (an auxiliary highway of Interstate 90), New York State Route 12 and State Route 8 form the North–South Arterial Highway.

=== Utilities ===
Electricity in Utica is provided by National Grid plc, a British energy corporation that acquired the city's former electricity provider, Niagara Mohawk, in 2002. Utica is near the crossroads of major electrical transmission lines, with substations in the town of Marcy. An expansion project by the New York Power Authority, National Grid, Consolidated Edison, and New York State Electric and Gas (NYSEG) is planned. In 2009 city businesses (including Utica College and St. Luke's Medical Center) developed a microgrid, and in 2012 the Utica City Council explored the possibility of a public, city-owned power company. Utica's natural gas is provided by National Grid and NYSEG.

Municipal solid waste is collected and disposed of weekly by the Oneida-Herkimer Solid Waste Authority, a public-benefit corporation that coordinates single-stream recycling, waste reduction, composting, and the disposal of hazardous materials and demolition debris. Utica's wastewater is treated by the Mohawk Valley Water Authority, with a capacity of 32 million gallons per day. Utica's drinking water comes from the stream-fed Hinckley Reservoir in the foothills of the Adirondack Mountains, with 700 mi (1,100 km) of piping throughout the city.

=== Health care ===
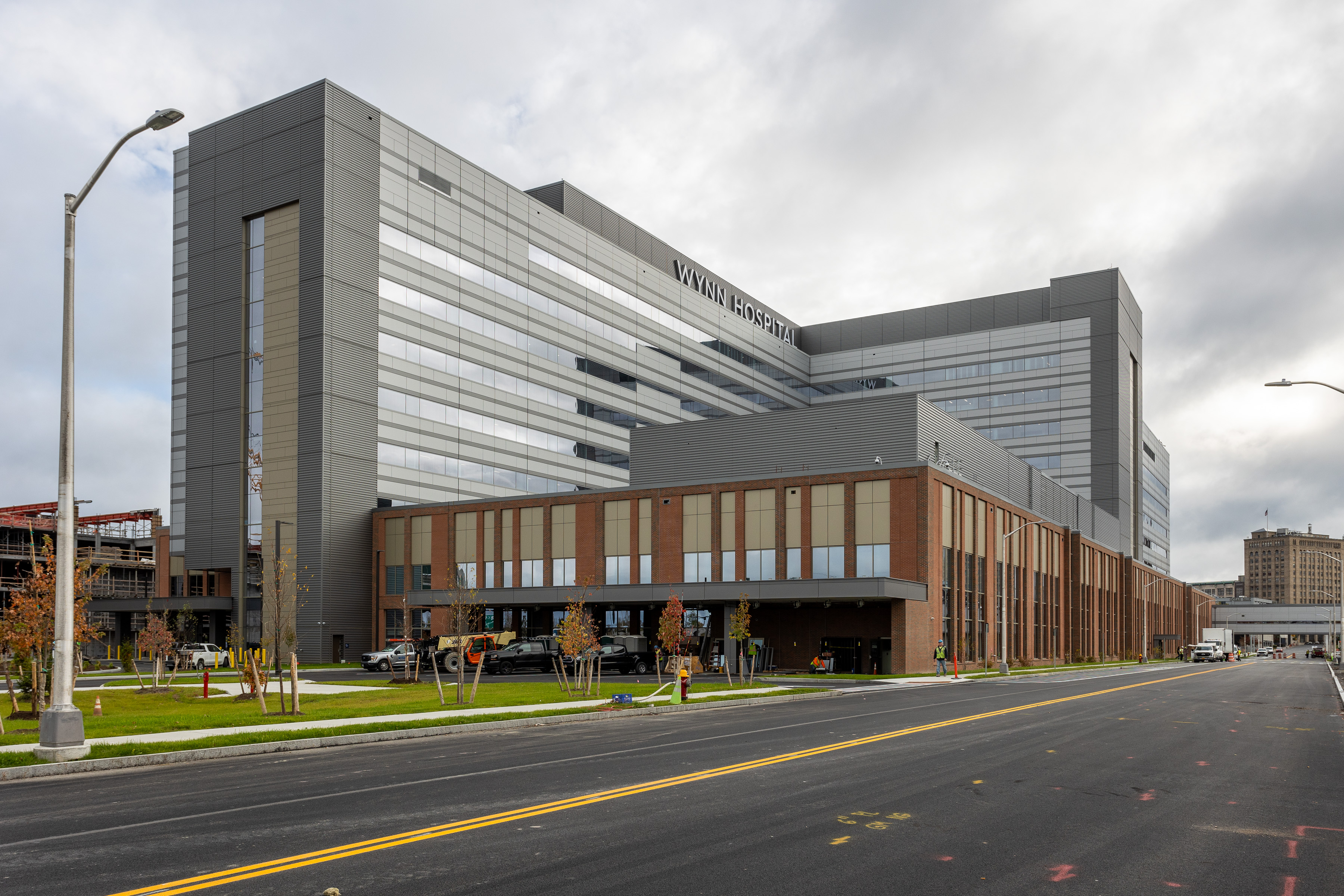
Wynn Hospital

The Wynn Hospital opened October 2023 in downtown Utica. This $650 million facility replaced the 66-year-old Faxton St. Luke’s Healthcare hospital and the 106-year old St. Elizabeth Medical Center, both of which are now closed. Wynn is part of the Mohawk Valley Health System, a non-profit formed in 2014 by the merger of Faxton St. Luke's Healthcare and St. Elizabeth Medical Center.

== Education ==
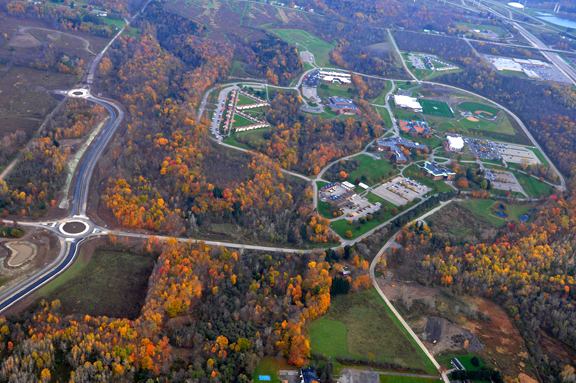
Aerial view of SUNY Polytechnic Institute from south to north

Like Ithaca and Syracuse, Utica has a mix of public and private colleges and universities; three state colleges and four private colleges are in the Utica–Rome metropolitan area. SUNY Polytechnic Institute, on a 400-acre campus in Marcy, has over 2,000 students and is one of 14 doctorate-granting universities of the State University of New York (SUNY). Mohawk Valley Community College is the largest college between Syracuse and Albany with nearly 7,000 students, and an Empire State College location serves Utica and Rome.

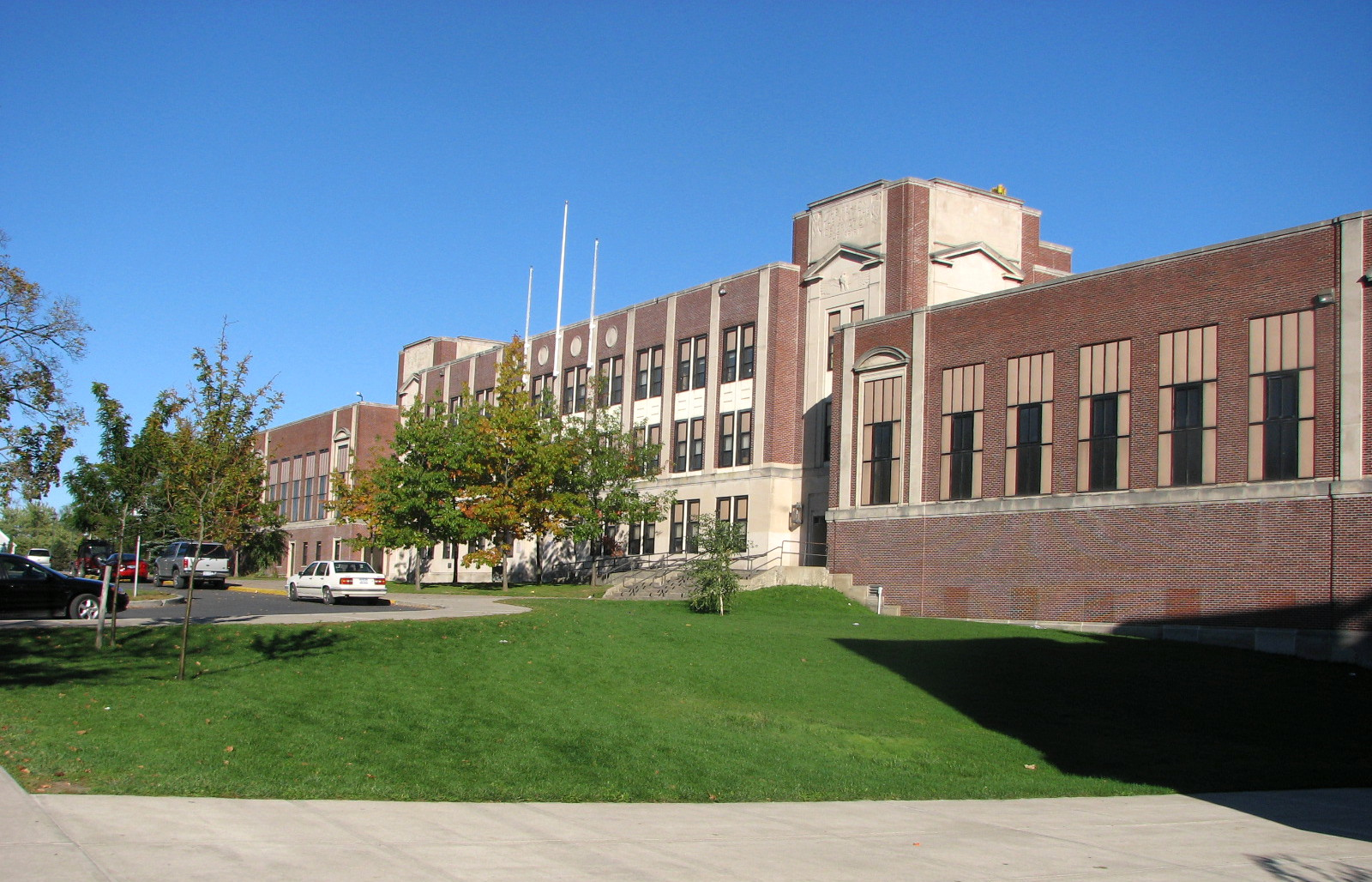
Thomas R. Proctor High School

Formerly a satellite campus of Syracuse University, Utica University (Utica College before 2022) is a four-year private liberal arts college with over 3,000 students. Established in 1904, St. Elizabeth College of Nursing partners with regional institutions to grant nursing degrees. Pratt Institute offers a local two-year fine-arts course through its satellite campus at Munson. The Utica School of Commerce, a for-profit business college, closed at the end of 2016.

The Utica City School District has a boundary that coincides with that of the city. It had an enrollment of nearly 10,000 in 2012 and as of 2015 is the most racially diverse school district in Upstate New York. District schools include Thomas R. Proctor High School, James H. Donovan Middle School, John F Kennedy middle school and ten elementary schools. Utica's original public high school, the Utica Free Academy, closed in 1987. The city is also home to Notre Dame Junior Senior High School, a small Catholic high school founded in 1959 by the Xaverian Brothers.

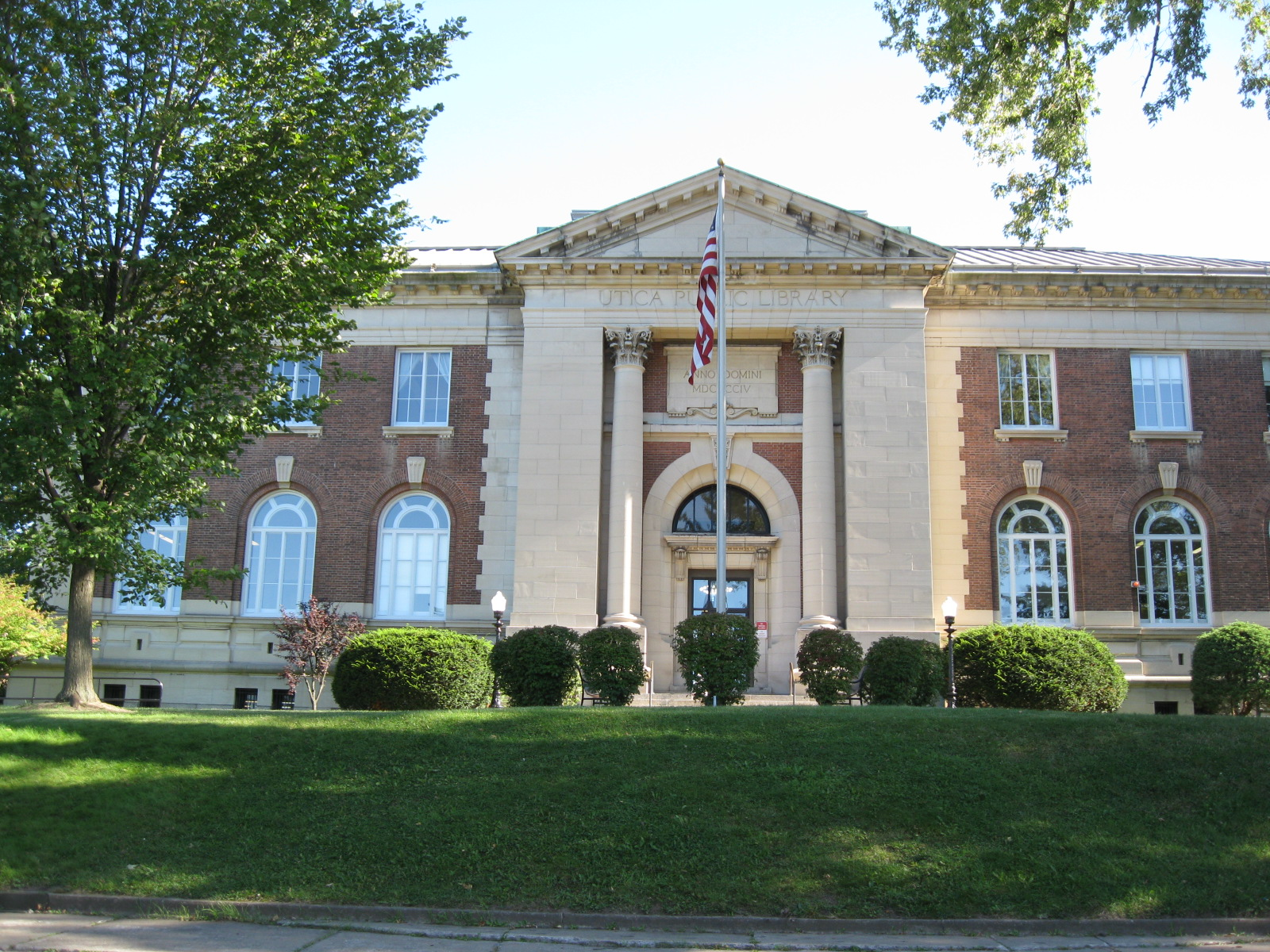
Utica Public Library

The first public library in Utica was founded in 1838. The library's location moved several times until construction of Utica Public Library was completed in 1904. Utica Public Library is part of the tri-county Mid-York Library System, which is also based in Utica. Both institutions are chartered by the Board of Regents of the University of the State of New York.

== Sports ==
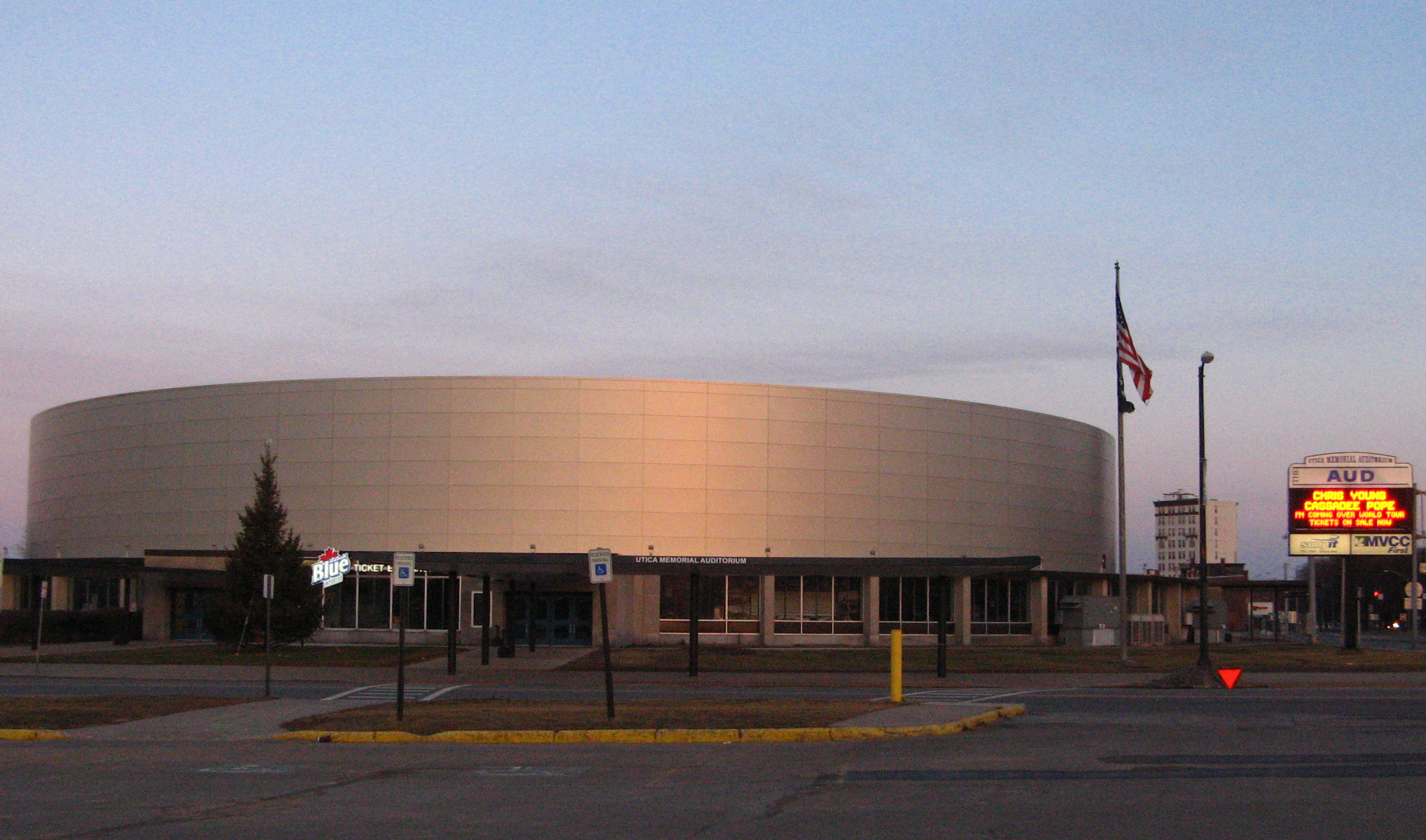
Adirondack Bank Center after renovations, 2016

Utica is home to the Utica Comets of the American Hockey League (AHL), a team affiliated with the National Hockey League's New Jersey Devils. The team was established in Utica for the 2013–14 season when the Vancouver Canucks relocated their AHL franchise. The 3,815-seat Utica Memorial Auditorium, or "the Aud", is home to the Comets and the Utica University Pioneers. The Utica Devils played in the AHL from 1987 to 1993, and the Utica Bulldogs (1993–94), Utica Blizzard (1994–1997), and Mohawk Valley Prowlers (1998–2001) were members of the United Hockey League (UHL). In April 2024, the 2024 IIHF Women's World Championship was played at the Aud.

Since 2018, the city is also home to Utica City FC, the former Syracuse Silver Knights, a professional indoor soccer team playing in the Major Arena Soccer League.

The city was home to the Utica Blue Sox (1939–2001), a New York–Penn League baseball team also affiliated with the Toronto Blue Jays and, later, the Miami Marlins. Other former baseball teams included the Utica Asylums (1900) and the Boston Braves-affiliated Utica Braves (1939–42). Since 2008, the city has been home to a collegiate summer baseball team also called the Blue Sox.

=== Area collegiate teams ===
School	Location	Nickname	Colors	Association	Conference	References
SUNY Polytechnic Institute	Marcy	Wildcats	Blue and gold	NCAA Division III	NEAC	
Hamilton College	Clinton	Continentals	Buff and blue	NCAA Division III	NESCAC	
Utica University	Utica	Pioneers	Navy and orange	NCAA Division III	Empire 8	
Mohawk Valley Community College	Utica, Rome	Hawks	Forest green and white	NJCAA	Region III	
Herkimer County Community College	Herkimer	Generals	Hunter green and gold	NJCAA	Region III	

== Media ==
Utica is served by three stations affiliated with major television networks: WKTV 2 (NBC; CBS on DT2), WUTR 20 (ABC), and WFXV 33 (Fox; CW on DT2). PBS member station WCNY-TV in Syracuse operates translator W22DO-D on channel 24. Several low-power television stations, such as WPNY-LD 11 (MyNetworkTV), also broadcast in the area. Cable television viewers are served by the Syracuse office of Charter Communications (doing business as Charter Spectrum), which produces Spectrum News Central New York and carries public-access channels. Dish Network and DirecTV provide satellite television customers with local broadcast channels.

Daily newspapers covering Utica news include the Rome Sentinel and the Observer-Dispatch. The city has 26 FM radio stations and nine AM stations. Major station owners in the area include Townsquare Media and Galaxy Communications. In addition to minor popular-culture references, Slap Shot (1977) was partially filmed in Utica, and the city has been featured on the TV series The Office.

== See also ==
- Lower Genesee Street Historic District
- Utica Shale — a geological formation named for Utica
- Timeline of town creation in Central New York
- East Utica

== Notes and references ==
=== Bibliography ===
- Bagg, M. M. (1892). Memorial History of Utica, N.Y.: From Its Settlement to the Present Time. Cornell University Library: D. Mason & Co. Publishers. OCLC 1837599.
- Bottini, Joseph P.; Davis, James L. (2007). Utica. Arcadia Publishing. ISBN 978-0-7385-5496-9.
- Childs, L. C. (1900). Outline History of Utica and Vicinity. Utica, New York: New Century Club. OCLC 1558992.
- Switala, William J. (2006). Underground Railroad in New Jersey and New York. Stackpole Books. ISBN 978-0-8117-3258-1.
- Thomas, Alexander R. (2003). In Gotham's Shadow. State University of New York Press. ISBN 978-0-7914-5595-1.
- Thomas, Alexander R.; Smith, Polly J. (2009). Upstate Down: Thinking about New York and Its Discontents. University Press of America. ISBN 978-0-7618-4500-3.
