= Utica greens =

Italian-American escarole dish

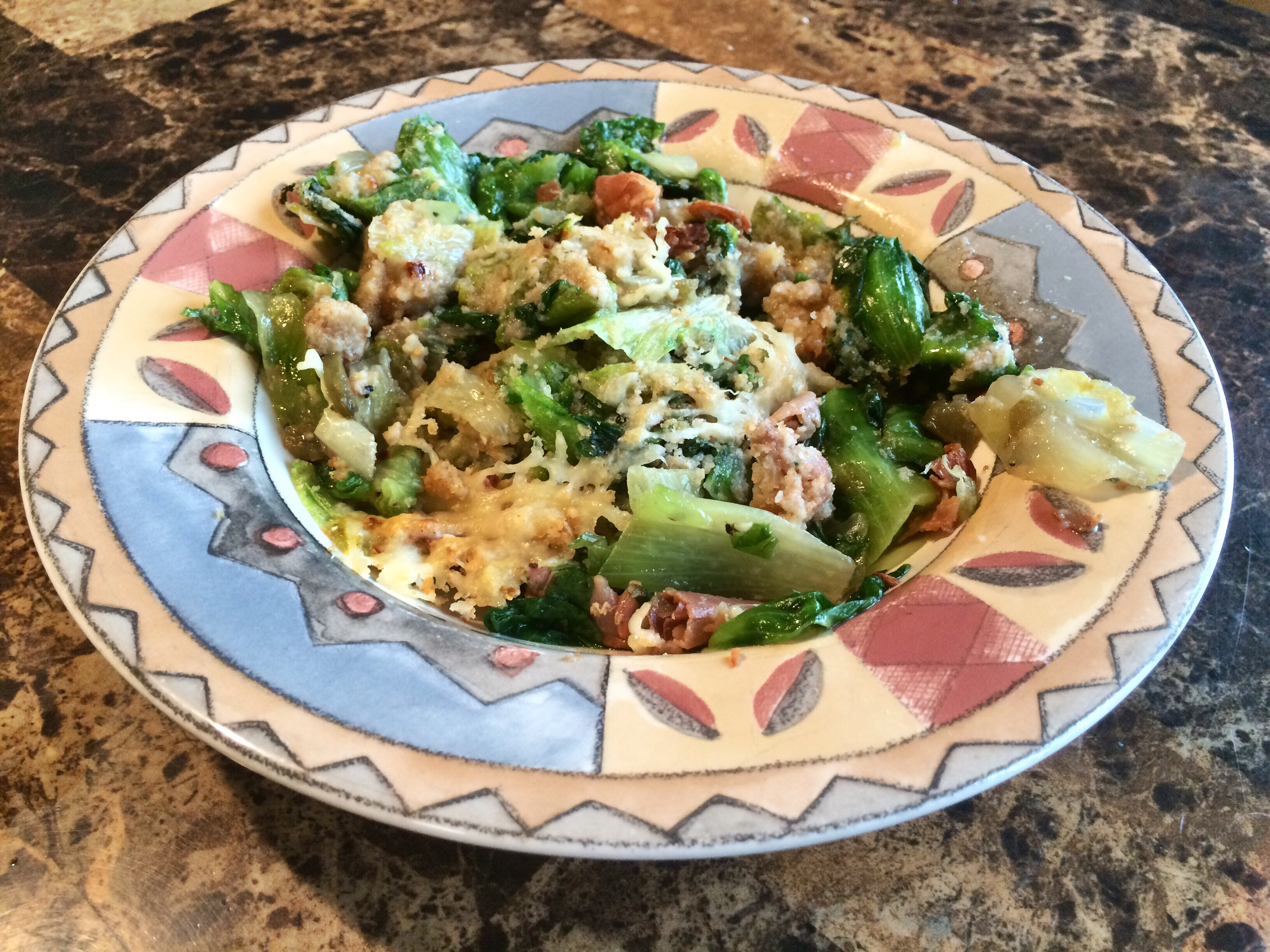
- Type: Vegetable
- Place of origin: Utica, New York, United States
- Serving temperature: Hot or warm
- Main ingredients: Escarole

Utica greens is an Italian American dish made of escarole sauteed with garlic and olive oil. Most recipes include hot cherry peppers, pecorino cheese, bread crumbs, prosciutto or another cured meat, and sometimes chicken broth. In the 1980s, Italian restaurants in Utica, New York began serving this variation on traditional Sicilian and Southern Italian sauteed greens; the dish has since spread to other cities in the United States. Other variations include greens with potatoes, romaine, kale, Swiss chard, and pignoli nuts.

== See also ==
- Cuisine of the Mid-Atlantic states
- List of vegetable dishes
