= Quackenbush =

Quackenbush is a surname of Dutch origin that is an Americanized form of the Dutch Quackenbosch. It is a toponymic surname from the Dutch kwak 'night heron' + bosch 'woodland wilderness'. The surname Quackenbosch is no longer found in the Netherlands. The family descends from 17th-century immigrant to New Netherland Pieter Quackenbosch.

== Name ==
Notable people with the surname include:

- Alvin J. Quackenbush, American merchant and politician from New York
- Bill Quackenbush, Canadian professional hockey player
- Chuck Quackenbush, American politician from California; state insurance commissioner and state assemblyman
- Dave Quackenbush, American punk rock singer
- Henry Quackenbush, American industrialist
- John A. Quackenbush, American politician from New York; U.S. representative 1888–1893
- John Quackenbush, American computational biologist and genome scientist
- Justin Lowe Quackenbush, American jurist
- Kevin Quackenbush, American baseball player
- Max Quackenbush, Canadian professional hockey player
- Mike Quackenbush, American professional wrestler
- Robert Quackenbush, American children's author
- Robert Quackenbush (politician), American politician from Wisconsin
- Sandra Quackenbush, American virologist
- Professor Quackenbush, a fictional adult character by Sloan Fischer in Kidsongs: Very Silly Songs

== Products ==
- Quackenbush rifle

== See also ==
- Herman I. Quackenboss, New York politician
