= Frederick H. Gouge =

American architect (1845–1927)

Frederick Hamilton Gouge
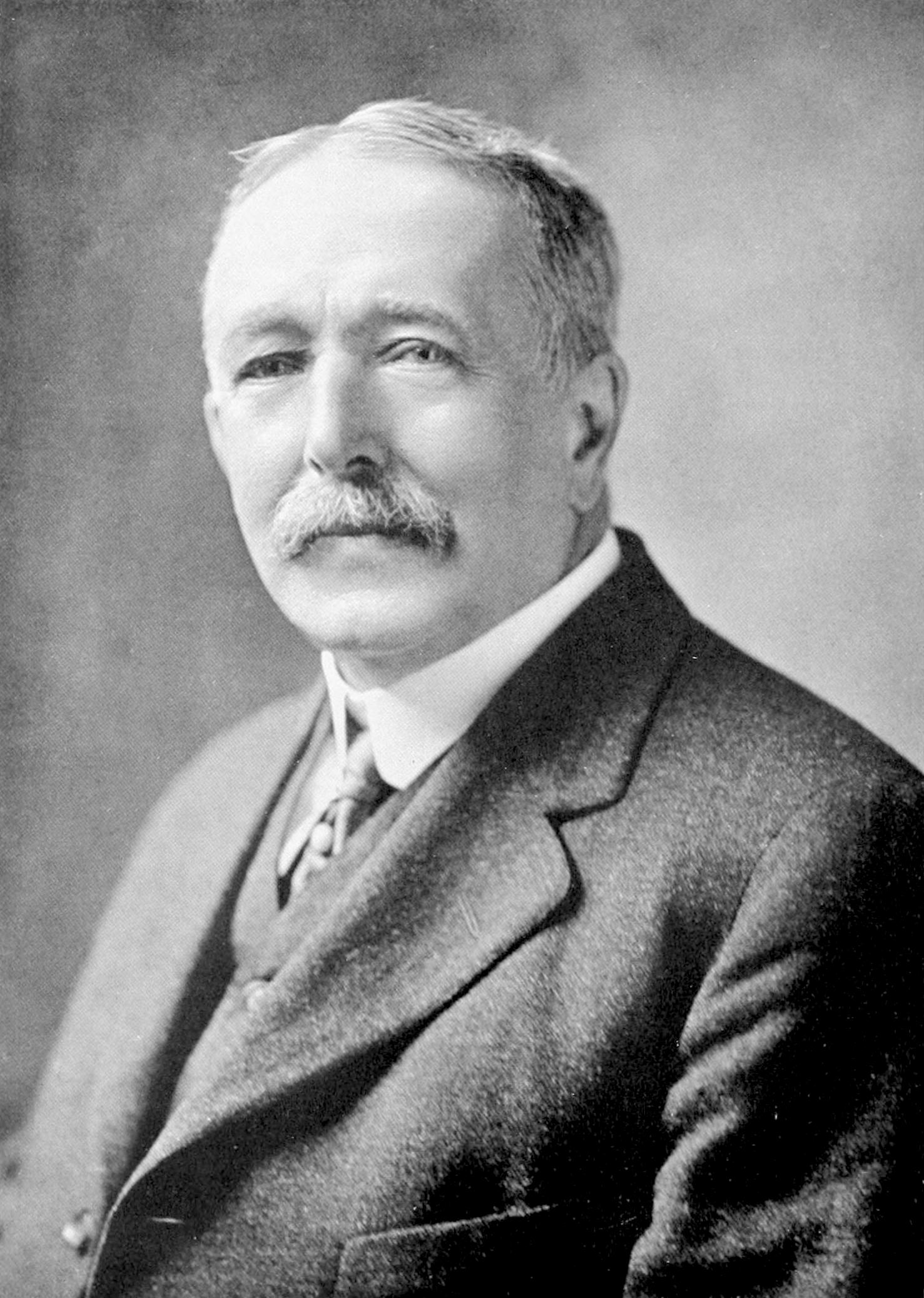
- Frederick H. Gouge, circa 1924
- Born: May 5, 1845; Trenton, New York
- Died: March 6, 1927 (aged 81); Utica, New York
- Occupation: Architect

Frederick Hamilton Gouge (1845–1927) was an American architect practicing in Utica, New York.

== Life and career ==
Frederick H. Gouge was born May 5, 1845, in Trenton, New York, to Jacob and Laura (Powers) Gouge. He grew up on the family farm and was educated in the district schools and the Rome Free Academy. In 1866 he enrolled at Hamilton College in Hamilton, New York, graduating in 1870 with a bachelor of arts degree. For two years he worked for a civil engineering firm, working on the Delaware and Bound Brook Railroad. In 1872 he went to Ithaca, where entered the office of Cornell University architect William Henry Miller, also a native of Trenton. They formed a partnership in 1873, and practiced together as Miller & Gouge for three years. In 1876 Gouge went to Utica, where he opened his own office as an architect. For the next several decades Gouge operated his practice as a sole practitioner. However, in 1913 at the age of about 68, Gouge formed a partnership with William W. Ames, forming the firm of Gouge & Ames. Ames had been employed by Gouge since 1884. Gouge practiced with Ames until his death, after which Ames continued the practice of Gouge & Ames up until his own death in 1949.

Gouge joined the American Institute of Architects (AIA) in 1882, and was elected to the College of Fellows in 1888. He was also a member of the Western New York State Association of Architects, a chapter of the Western Association of Architects, which organization was merged into the AIA in 1889. He twice served as president of the Central New York chapter.

In addition to his professional affiliations, Gouge was a member of the Utica Chamber of Commerce and served a term as president. He was also a member of the Fort Schuyler Club and the Royal Arcanum.

== Personal life ==
Gouge was married to Abbie Perkins Moore, a great-granddaughter of founding father Roger Sherman, in 1881. They had three children: Julia Sherman Gouge (1886-1969), Laura Moore Gouge (1883-1945) and George Frederick Gouge (1890-1948). Gouge died March 6, 1927, in Utica and was buried at the Olden Barneveld Cemetery. His son George became a successful advertising executive in New York City.

== Legacy ==
Gouge was architect of at least six buildings that have been listed on the United States National Register of Historic Places, though one has been demolished.

- H.M. Quackenbush Factory Herkimer, New York (1874, NRHP 2022)
- Doyle Hardware Building, 330 Main St, Utica, New York (1881 and 1901, NRHP 1993)
- Winston Building, 230 Genesee St, Utica, New York (1881)
- Fraternity house for Delta Upsilon, 66 Broad St, Hamilton, New York (1882–83, demolished)
- Memorial Presbyterian Church, Court St and Sunset Ave, Utica, New York (1882–84, demolished 1985)
- Knox Hall of Natural History, Hamilton College, Clinton, New York (1883, altered)
- Carlile Building, 240 Genesee St, Utica, New York (1884)
- Newell Building, 111 Genesee St, Utica, New York (1884, demolished)
- Sayre Building, 121 Genesee St, Utica, New York (1884, demolished)
- Utica City National Bank Building, Genesee and Catherine Sts, Utica, New York (1884, demolished)
- St. Francis de Sales R. C. Church (former), 131 Eagle St, Utica, New York (1887)
- Park Baptist Church, Rutger and West Sts, Utica, New York (1886–88, demolished)
- Fraternity house for Delta Upsilon, 22 College Hill Rd, Clinton, New York (1888)
- Washington School, 1216 Oswego St, Utica, New York (1889, demolished)
- Cayuga County Savings Bank Building, 115 Genesee St, Auburn, New York (1891, demolished 1954)
- Colgate Gymnasium, Colgate University, Hamilton, New York (1893, demolished 1924)
- John C. Hieber Building, 311 Main St, Utica, New York (1893, NRHP 2007)
- Benedict Hall of Languages, Hamilton College, Clinton, New York (1897)
- Addition to the New Century Club, 253 Genesee St, Utica, New York (1897, NRHP 1985)
- Truax Hall of Philosophy, Hamilton College, Clinton, New York (1900, demolished 1970)
- Chemistry Building, Hamilton College, Clinton, New York (1903, altered 1930)
- Commons Hall, Hamilton College, Clinton, New York (1903)
- Commercial Travelers Mutual Accident Association Building, 70 Genesee St, Utica, New York (1904)
- Carnegie Hall, Hamilton College, Clinton, New York (1904)
- Utica Daily Press Building, 310 Main St, Utica, New York (1904–05, NRHP 1993)
- Plymouth Church, 500 Plant St, Utica, New York (1905–06)
- Catherine Nellis Memorial Chapel, Fort Plain Cemetery, Fort Plain, New York (1906–07)
- South Hall, Hamilton College, Clinton, New York (1907)
- Richfield Springs Public Library, 102 W Main St, Richfield Springs, New York (1910)
- Fraternity house for Delta Upsilon, Campus Rd, Clinton, New York (1911–12)
- Hurd & Fitzgerald Building, 400 Main St, Utica, New York (1911, NRHP 1993)
- Byington Mill Office, 421-423 Broad St, Utica, New York (1912, NRHP 1993, demolished 2007)
- East Utica Library (former), 900 Lansing St, Utica, New York (1913)
- Kernan School, Utica, New York (1915, demolished 2018)
- Mary Lyon Fisher Memorial Chapel, Wildwood Cemetery, Lyons Falls, New York (1921–22, NRHP 2011)
- Andrews Hall, Colgate University, Hamilton, New York (1922–23)
- Parish House, Plymouth Church, 500 Plant St, Utica, New York (1924)
- South Church, Congregational (former), 2317 Genesee St, Utica, New York (1927)
- Mount Markham Central School, (Note: Designed in association with architects Kinne & Frank, also of Utica.) 500 Fairground Rd, West Winfield, New York (1932–33)

== Gallery of architectural works ==
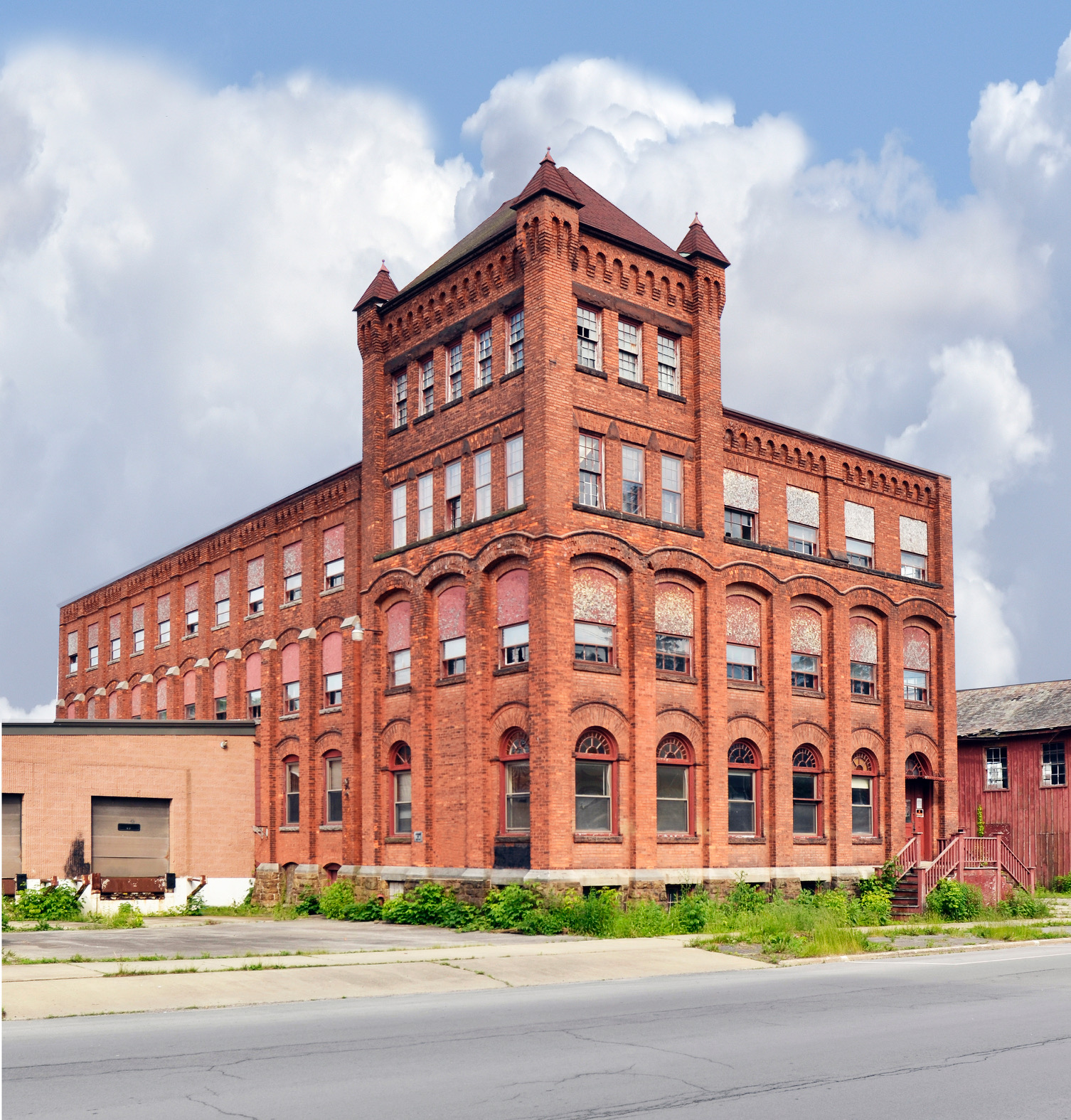
H.M. Quackenbush Factory, Herkimer, NY, 1874.

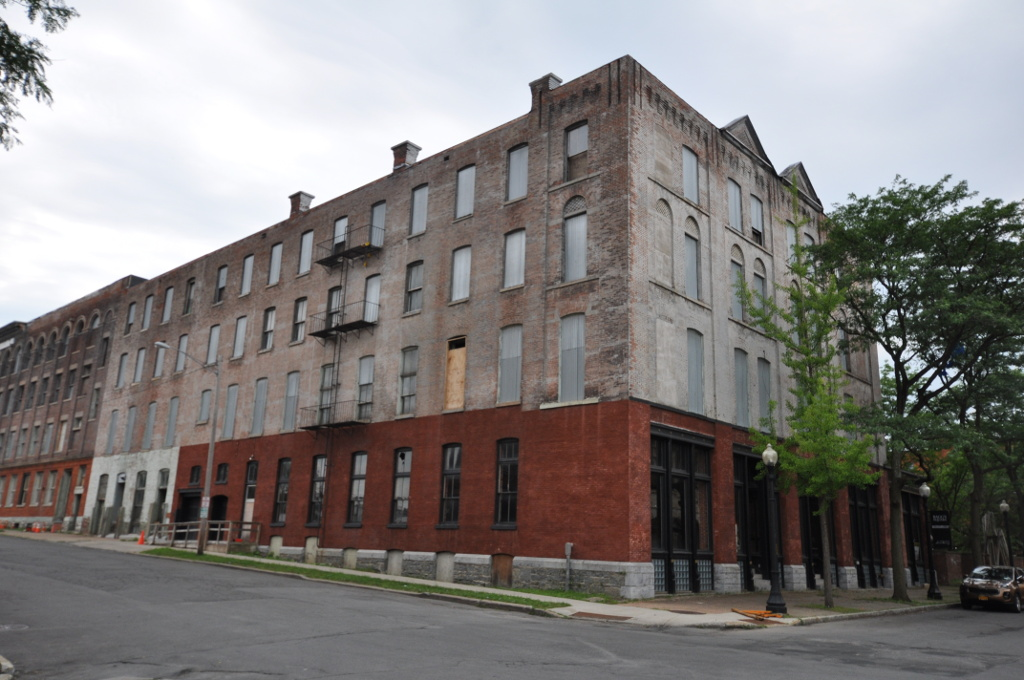
Doyle Hardware Building, Utica, New York, 1881 and 1901.

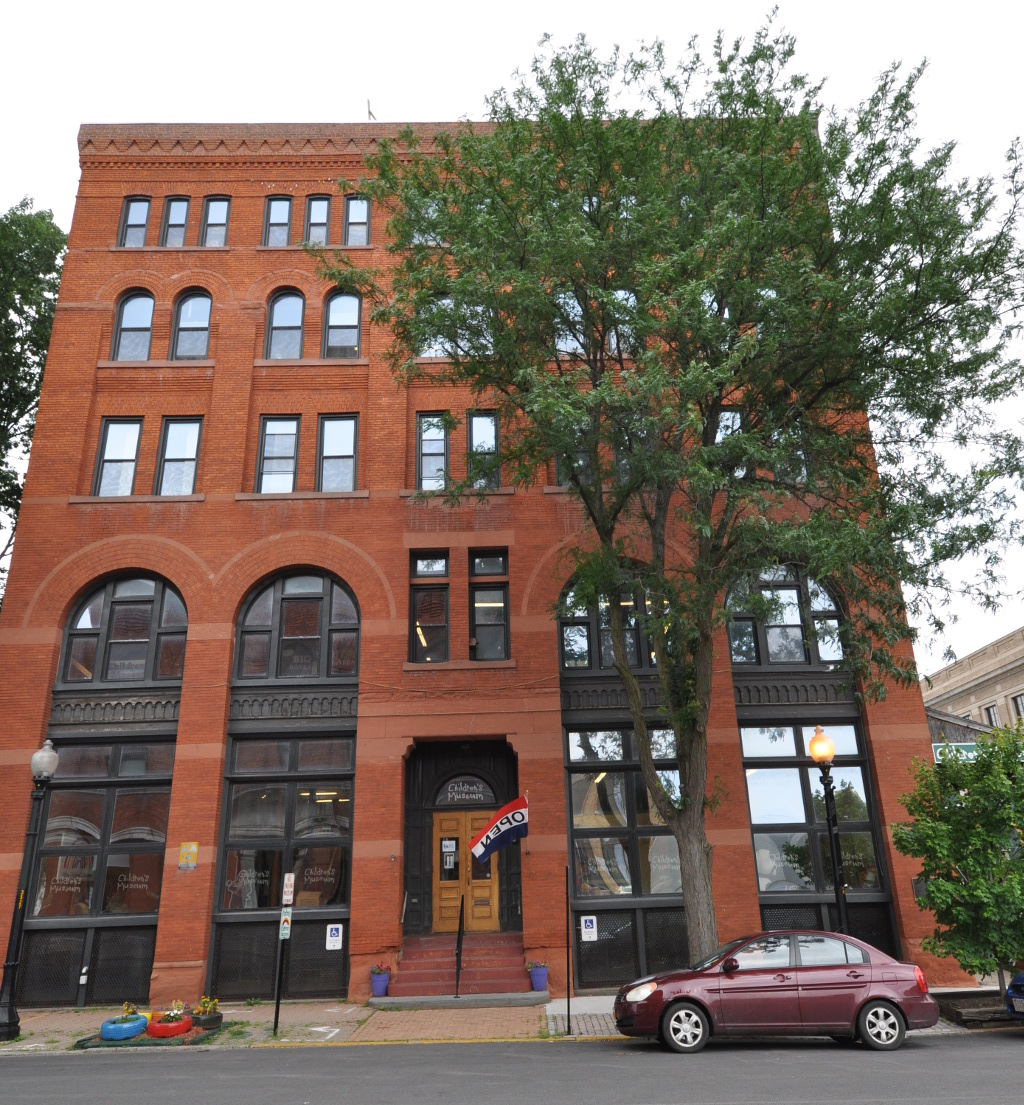
John C. Hieber Building, Utica, New York, 1893.

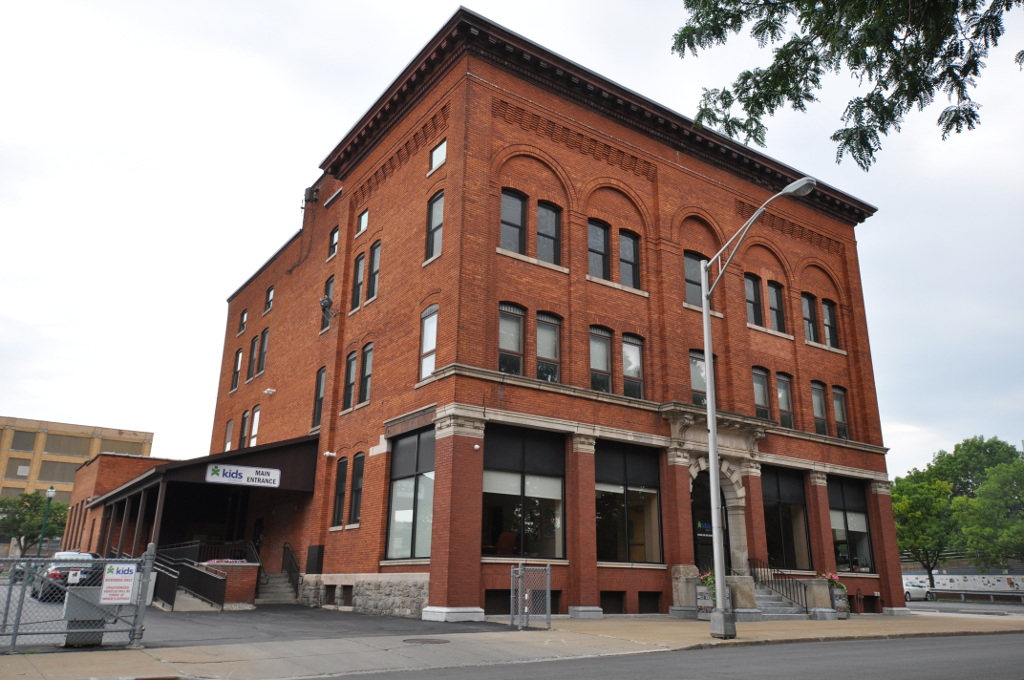
Utica Daily Press Building, Utica, New York, 1904-05.

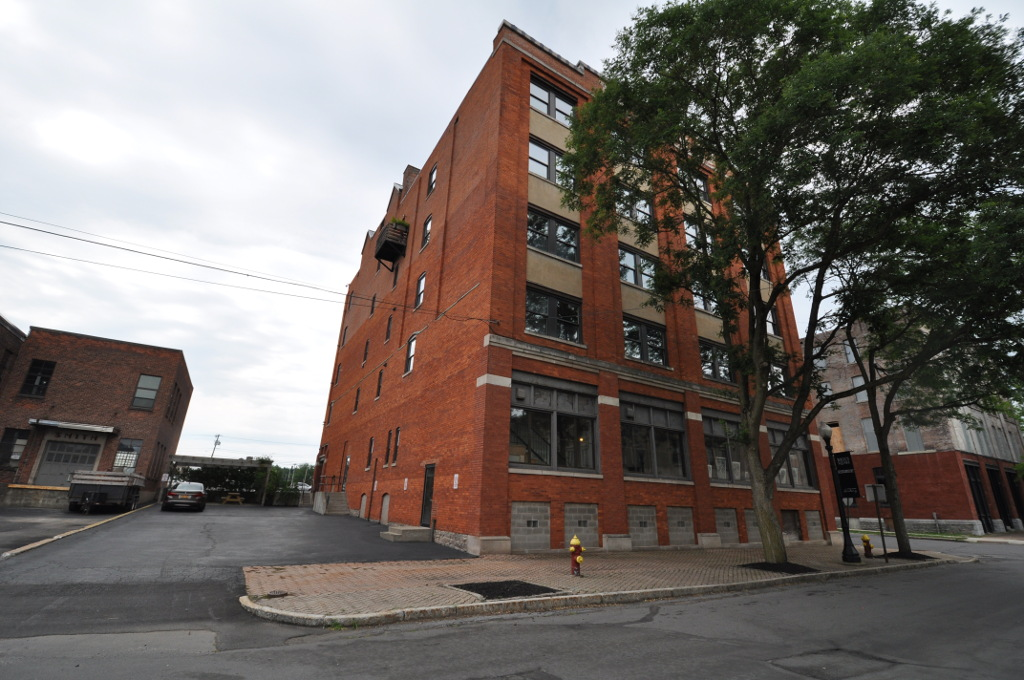
Hurd & Fitzgerald Building, Utica, New York, 1911.
