= HMQ =

HMQ or hmq may refer to:

- hmq, ISO 639-3 code for Hmu language
- HMQ Group, organizations founded by Henry Quackenbush
- HMQ Productions, producer of 1996 film Gulls including Jeanie Drynan
- HMQ, initialism for Her Majesty the Queen used in the Monarchy of Canada and other monarchies
- HMQ, division code for Huimin, Hohhot, China
