= Hunting weapon =

Weapon primarily for hunting game animals

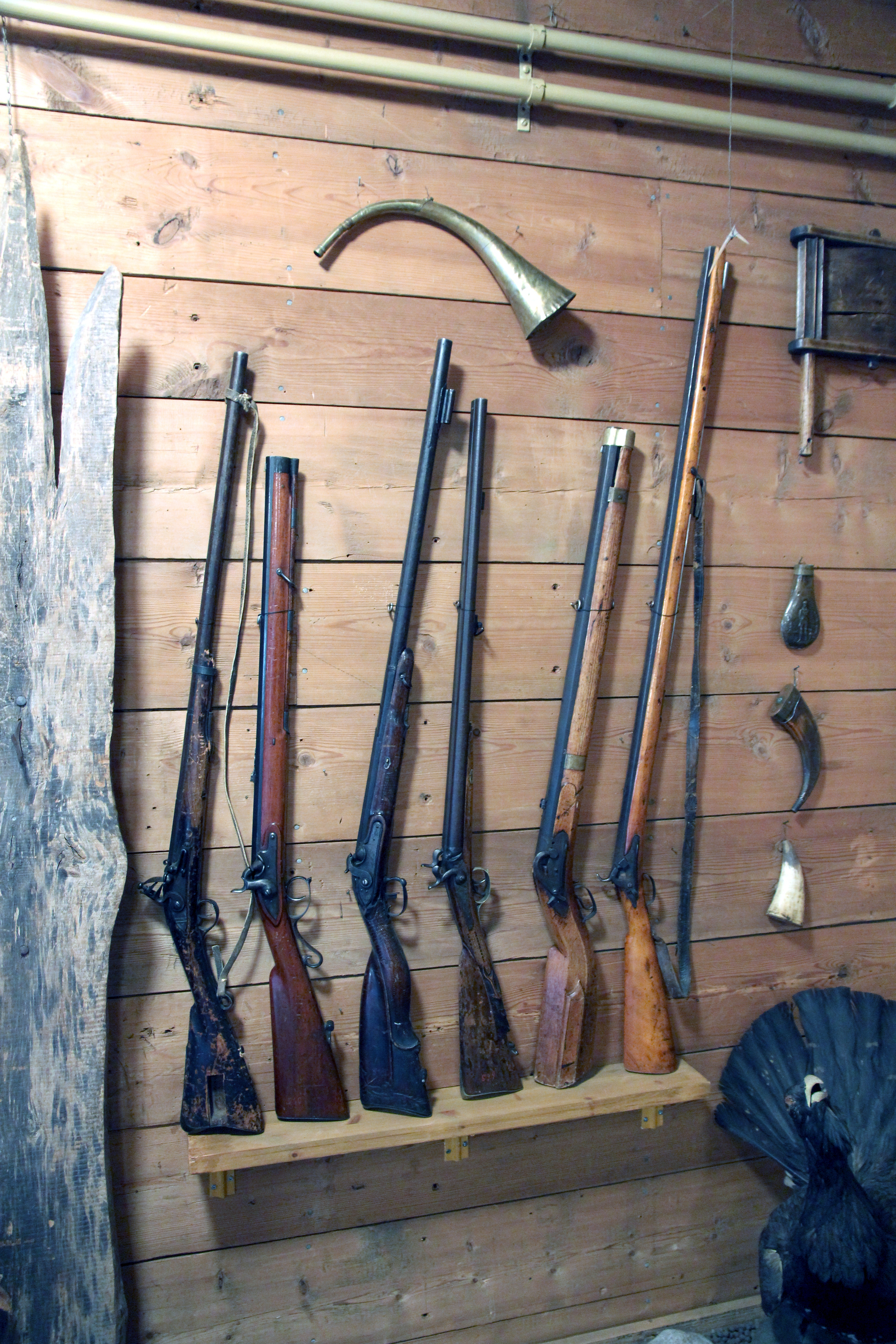
Old hunting rifles at the Suur-Savo Museum in Mikkeli, Finland

Hunting weapons are weapons designed or used primarily for hunting game animals for food or sport, as distinct from defensive weapons or weapons used primarily in warfare.

== Characteristics ==
Since human beings are lacking in the natural weapons possessed by other predators, humans have a long history of making tools to overcome this shortcoming. The evolution of hunting weapons shows an ever-increasing ability to extend the hunter's reach, while maintaining the ability to produce disabling or lethal wounds, allowing the hunter to capture the game.

The spear was in use for hunting as early as five million years ago in hominid and chimpanzee societies, and its usage may go back even further. The spear gave the hunter the ability to kill large animals, at ranges as far as the hunter could throw the spear; the Roman pilum, for example, had a range of 30 metres (98 feet). Spear throwing devices such as the bâton de commandement, woomera, and atlatl extended that range even further by giving the hunter leverage to throw the spear faster and farther. The atlatl allowed a skilled user to throw a dart up to 100 metres (110 yards). Archaeological evidence of the atlatl has been found on all continents except for Antarctica. The atlatl was displaced starting in the late Paleolithic with the easier to make and use bow and arrow, which remains in common use today in both sporting and hunting. With the advent of accurate, reliable firearms, firearms became the weapon of choice. Each new evolution of hunting weapons extended the range and accuracy; a skilled hunter, with suitable equipment and good conditions, can take game at ranges of over 1,000 meters (1 km).

Another hunting weapon, based on different principles than the spear, is the throwing stick. While at its simplest the throwing stick is just a heavy club thrown at the game, a well-designed throwing stick uses the principles of an airfoil shape and gyroscopic stability; the oldest of these dates back 200,000 years to ancient Poland. The kylie, for example, Australian hunting boomerang in use into modern times, uses the bent shape and a symmetric airfoil cross-section to provide stability and low drag for long, accurate throws. Kylies do not return (a good thing, since they are large, heavy, and dangerous) but smaller, lighter versions, the classic boomerang, exhibit the classic circular path that made the boomerang famous. Boomerangs, of both the non-returning and returning variety, have been found in many ancient cultures, ranging from Egypt to North America.

Other early weapons used for hunting include the sling, which allows small stones or metal balls to be thrown at much higher velocities than the arm alone, and the blowgun. The South American blowgun's curare tipped darts, intended to paralyze small game, is very similar in function to modern capture guns, with the substitution of a barbiturate for the paralytic curare.

== Usage and regulations ==
Hunting weapons are typically regulated by game category, area within the state, and time period. Regulations for big game hunting often specify a minimum caliber or muzzle energy for firearms. The use of rifles is often banned for safety reasons in areas with high population density, limited topographic relief, or for hunting on bodies of water where the danger of ricochet exists. Specific seasons for bow hunting or muzzle-loading black-powder guns are often established to limit competition with hunters using more effective firearms. The state of Oklahoma, for example, has a three-and-a-half-month archery season, a 25-day muzzleloader season, and a 16-day modern gun season

== History ==
The atlatl, one of the "newest" popular primitive hunting weapons

The most popular hunting weapons during antiquity were the bow and the spear. During pre-history, prior to the invention of the bow, the most popular was arguably the atlatl; archaeological finds of atlatls have occurred on all continents except Antarctica. Today, however, the most popular primitive hunting weapons are muzzleloading rifles. Whatever the choice of arms, primitive hunting weapons are used during special primitive weapon hunting seasons in many parts of the world

Atlatls, consisting of a weighted stick with a flexible spear or dart, are one example of primitive weapons that are commonly used today. In the U.S., the Pennsylvania Game Commission has given preliminary approval for the legalization of the atlatl for hunting certain animals. The animals that would be allowed to atlatl hunters have yet to be determined, but attention is focused on deer. There are some who object, stating that the atlatl is rarely capable of a clean kill, resulting in undue suffering for the sport animal. As of 2007, only Alabama allowed the use of the atlatl for deer hunting, with a few other states allowing its use for rough fish (rather than food or sport species), as well as some game birds and non-game mammals.

Primitive hunting weapons are the only weapons permitted for some types of modern-day hunting. For example, the newly opened 2007 Florida Alligator Hunt specifically prohibits firearms due to the dangers of firing bullets around bodies of water, and recommends instead the use of a detachable-head harpoon for hunting alligators during the nighttime hours that hunting is permitted. A bang stick, a specialized type of firearm, is then often used to sever the spinal cord of the alligator just to the rear of the head. This kills the alligator immediately upon its being taken, as required by regulatory laws governing the hunt.

- Atlatl
- Bolas
- Blowgun
- Bow (weapon)
- Boomerang
- Cutlass
- Hunting sword
- Crossbow
- Harpoon (for hunting marine mammals and Florida alligators)
- Muzzleloader
- Spear
- Slingshot
- Sling (weapon)
- Woomera (spear-thrower)

== Firearms by type ==
Modern cartridge firearms are generally broken down into classifications based on their characteristics. Due to the vast number of laws regulating firearms in different jurisdictions, legal definitions may vary widely from the technical definitions provided here.

=== Rifles ===
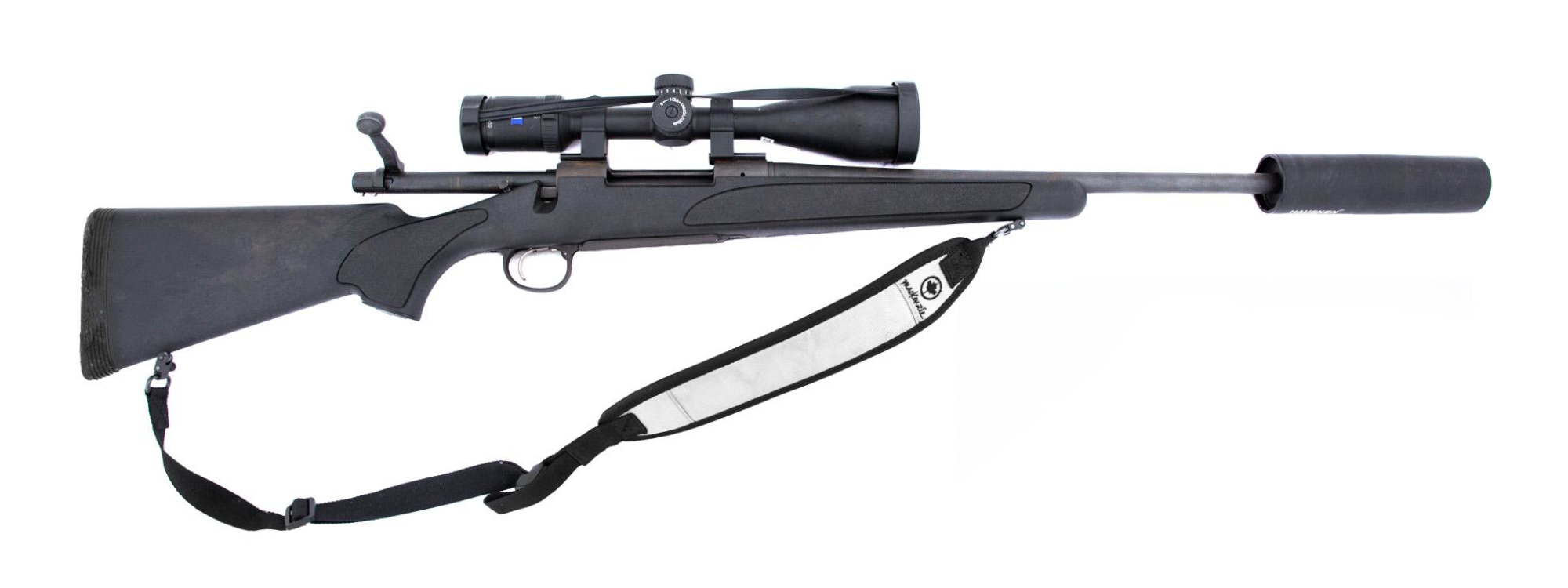
Remington Model 700 bolt-action hunting rifle in .30-06 Springfield with mounted telescopic sight and suppressor

Rifles are shoulder fired guns with rifled barrels, and provide the greatest accuracy and range of all hunting weapons. Centerfire rifles are generally used for killing big-game species. Rimfire rifles, such as the .22 Long Rifle, are used for killing small-game species.

=== Shotguns ===
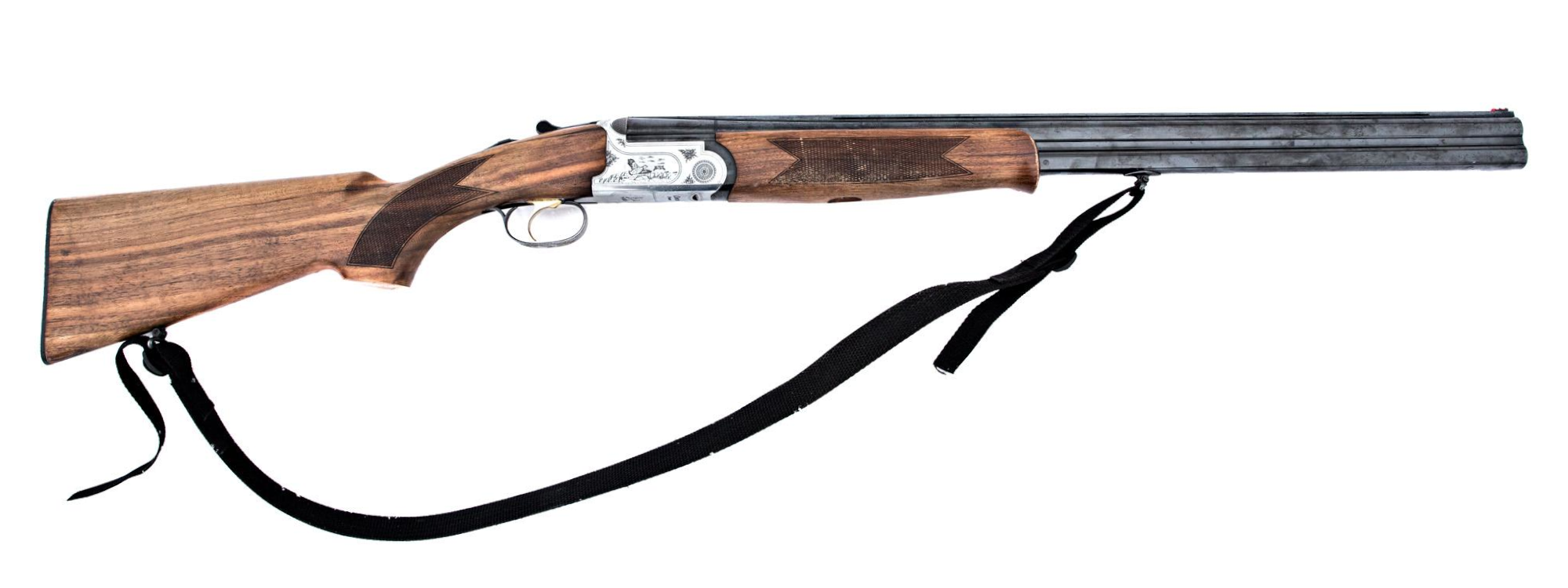
12-gauge break-action over/under shotgun

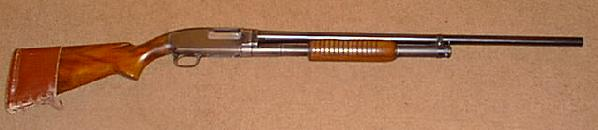
Winchester Model 1912 12-gauge hammerless pump-action shotgun

Shotguns were originally designed to fire multiple small projectiles in a single shot. This method is still used mainly for hunting small game, and, occasionally, for hunting deer with buckshot, but modern shotguns can also be used for bigger game (deer, bear, etc.) when loaded with slugs. Hunting shotguns are shoulder-fired weapons, and are generally smoothbores, but guns designed to fire slugs may have rifled barrels. Shotguns are used for short range shooting, and are less accurate than rifles, though the ability to fire multiple projectiles makes them ideal for small, fast moving targets. Additionally, the shorter effective range of shotguns, measured typically less than 100 yards (91 m) when using shot or slugs, with a maximum slug travel range of a few hundred yards for missed shots, becomes a safety advantage when hunting in areas with high population densities relative to using rifles that may have a maximum bullet travel range of several miles for missed shots.

=== Handguns ===
Handguns are becoming increasingly popular for hunting. Intended to be fired with one or two hands, but lacking a shoulder support, handguns are more challenging to shoot accurately than a long gun (a rifle or shotgun). Hunting handguns differ from defensive handguns in a number of ways; hunting handguns usually have longer barrels, better sights (often mounting telescopic sights or red dot sights), and, depending on the game, will fire a much more powerful cartridge. Rimfire hunting handguns can be of any action type, but centerfire hunting handguns are dominated by the single shot and revolver actions, such as the Thompson Center Arms Contender.

=== Powerheads or bang sticks ===
A powerhead or bang stick is a device which fires a firearms cartridge or blank cartridge in contact with the target, and relies primarily on the muzzle blast to kill the target. Powerheads are often attached to spears used for spear fishing, or attached to a handle to make a bang stick, which is thrust (while still held) at the target. Bang sticks are often carried for defense against shark attack, but are legally required for alligator hunting in some areas.

== Firearms by action ==
Firearms are often broken down further by the action type, which describes how the firearm loads and fires each cartridge.

=== Single-shot firearms ===
Single-shot firearms used for hunting generally fall into three categories:

- Falling-block action
- Break-barrel action
- Single-shot bolt action

Single-shot firearms when used for hunting have some advantages over other rifles: they are cheap, they are usually more accurate, and their silent action does not scare game. On the other hand, their single-shot characteristic limit one's ability to make follow-up or repeated shots quickly, when the first round does not provide a clean kill or when multiples of game appear. Likewise, when hunting dangerous game, having only a single shot capability increases the danger for the hunter, and single-shot firearms are therefore rarely used for hunting dangerous game. Single-shot designs can be found in all classes of hunting firearms, including rifles, shotguns, and handguns.

=== Multi-barreled firearms ===
Rifles and shotguns containing multiple barrels are some of the oldest types of multi-shot firearms, and their use continues to this day. These guns are traditionally used for hunting fast-moving or dangerous game, as the simplicity of the design makes a rapid second shot quick and certain; double rifles are known as express rifles or when combined shotgun with rifle, are known as a combination gun, the original "combination" guns and are mostly manufactured by specialized gunsmiths in Europe. The double-barreled shotgun is still the primary choice for most shotgun sporting events, as well as hunting of game birds. The double rifle, due to the difficulty involved in regulating the two barrels to impact at the same point of aim, is prohibitively expensive; for example, a Purdey, Parker or Holland & Holland double rifle sells between US$50,000 to $150,000. Combination guns, containing two, three, four, or five barrels, most often with a mix of rifle and shotgun barrels, and are popular choices for hunting in Europe. A typical three barrel drilling mix of a rimfire rifle, a powerful centerfire rifle, and a shotgun barrel allows the taking of a very wide range of game with a single gun. Multi-barrel designs in hunting guns are generally restricted to rifles, shotguns, and combination guns.

=== Revolvers ===
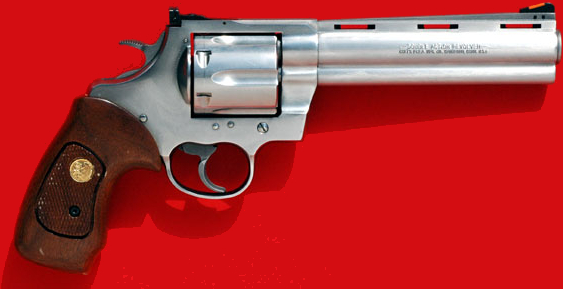
.44 Magnum Colt Anaconda

Revolvers use multiple chambers and a single barrel to provide much of the reliability of a multi-barreled firearm without the weight and expense. Generally found only in handguns, the revolver is becoming increasingly popular for hunting ever larger game, as shown by earlier developments such as the .41 Remington Magnum, and .44 Remington Magnum, and by later developments such as the .454 Casull, .460 S&W Magnum, .480 Ruger, and .500 S&W Magnum.

=== Repeating action types ===
Repeating actions provide an easy way for the user to load a new round of ammunition into the firearm, usually from a spring-loaded magazine. These may be manually operated, or powered by energy tapped from the firing of a cartridge.

- Bolt-action firearms are rugged, reliable, and typically the most accurate, due to the strong camming action that locks the bolt into the receiver. The disadvantage is that bolt actions require removing the firing hand from the trigger to operate the bolt, which requires more time between shots than other repeating actions.
- Lever-action firearms represent the earliest successful repeating actions. Essentially unchanged for over a century, lever action rifles are faster to operate than a bolt action, though the traditional designs and tubular magazines used limit the pressures and bullet shapes that can be used. The use of lever action hunting rifles is deeply embedded in American culture.
- Pump-action firearms are faster to cycle than lever actions, but are not well suited for firing from a supported position. Most pump-action designs are found in shotguns, which are typically fired from a standing position where the movement of the arm to operate the action is not an issue.
- Semi-automatic firearms are similar in principle to Automatic firearms, but only allow one shot per pull of the trigger. These actions provide the fastest operation, usually allowing a shot to be fired as fast as the shooter can pull the trigger. Since the action requires the energy created by the cartridge to operate the cyclic, there is less felt recoil, however, they may fail to cycle under extreme conditions.

== Air rifles and air pistols ==
Air rifles have long been used as hunting weapons, for well over 200 years. Lewis & Clark, on their early journey through the Western United States, carried a repeating air rifle for use as a hunting weapon, it being considered more reliable than the flintlocks they also carried on their exploring journey.

Air rifles are well suited for hunting small game such as squirrels and rabbits in commonly available powers. Such hunting is widely practiced in the United States and in the UK. Nonetheless, some states in the United States prohibit the use of air rifles for hunting regardless of the foot pound equivalent (FPE) of the projectile that is launched; for example, Florida prohibits the use of any air rifle for any hunting. On the other hand, in the UK, 12 FPE is the categorical limit for air rifles used for hunting. Above this muzzle energy rating, air rifles are considered to be firearms from a legal standpoint in the UK, and normal firearms regulations apply to these higher power air rifles.

Air pistols and rifles are also well suited for hunting vermin (e.g., rats).

Large game air rifles have experienced a resurgence in the last several decades, and are now capable of taking all game in North America, unlike the earlier Quackenbush rifle. Power levels of modern large game air rifles have greatly exceeded the hunting capabilities of the earlier Girandoni Air Rifle. Large bore air rifles made by Dennis Quackenbush, or those imported from Korea (i.e. Dragon Claw 50 caliber imported by Pyramydair), are capable of generating about 200 ft⋅lbf (270 J) of energy with large bullets (200 grains (13 g) or more), making them capable of taking large game.

== Animals ==
Trained animals, most commonly dogs, are often used to track, flush, or retrieve game in various forms of hunting. In some sports, animals are also used as the weapons for bringing down the game. Examples of animals used in this way are some breeds of canines such as hounds, terriers, and dachshunds or raptors such as falcons, hawks, and eagles.
