= Leslie Butterscotch =

American retired professional wrestler

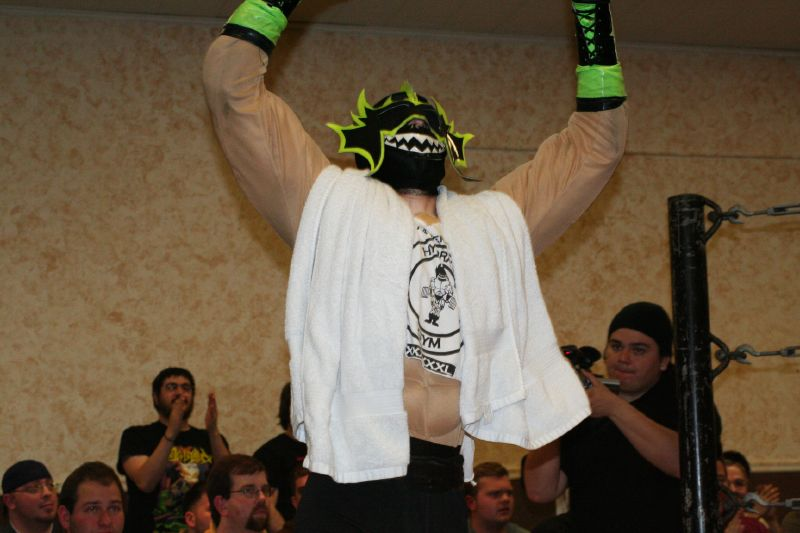
- Hydra in 2008

Personal information
- Born: Andrew Dinsmore Wilmington, Delaware

Professional wrestling career
- Ring name(s): Hydra; Leslie Butterscotch
- Billed height: 5 ft 9 in (1.75 m)
- Billed weight: 140 lb (64 kg)
- Billed from: The Belly of the Beast
- Trained by: Chris Hero; Mike Quackenbush
- Debut: 2005

Andrew Dinsmore is an American professional wrestler best known his time in the wrestling promotion Chikara as Hydra. During his time in Chikara, he was part of The Order of the Neo-Solar Temple and The Sea Donsters.

== Career ==
=== Chikara ===
==== Debut (2005–2006) ====
Hydra made his debut for Chikara, as a rudo on November 13, 2005 at an event at Philadelphia, Pennsylvania. He was featured in a match teaming with UltraMantis Black, Icarus and Dr. Cheung in a winning effort against Angel de Fuego, Lance Steel, Lance Steel and Mister ZERO. He would become UltraMantis Black's protégé however Black shortly became inactive. On November 19, 2005, Hydra received his first loss in CHIKARA when his team consisting of him, The Punisher and Dr. Cheung lost to Lance Steel, Dragon Dragon and Equinox. On February 25, with Equinox, Hydra lost in the first round of a tag team tournament to Chris Hero and Claudio Castagnoli.

==== The Order of the Neo-Solar Temple (2006–2008) ====
Hydra would then form a stable with UltraMantis Black, who would later include Crossbones in October 2006, on June 25, 2006 when Black attacked his old, and now technicos, partner Hallowicked during the Young Lions Cup. Hallowicked had begun teaming with Delirious to form the team Incoherence. On July 22, Hydra and UltraMantis defeated Fire Ant and Soldier Ant. However, on August 22, they were defeated by Ryan Cruz and Darin Corbin.

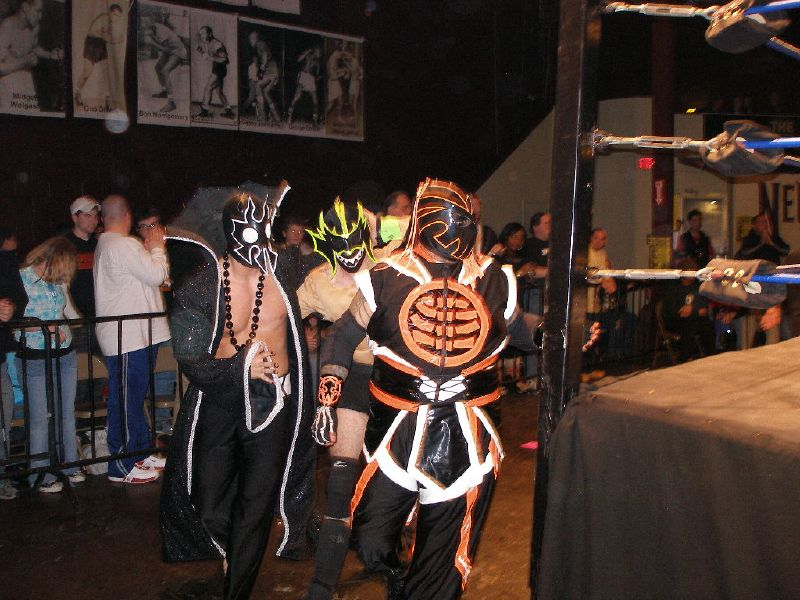
(Left to right) UltraMantis Black, Hydra and Crossbones of the Order of the Neo–Solar Temple

Hydra then teamed with Los Ice Creams to defeat The Colony and The Equinox on September 22, 2006. Crossbones would then make his first appearance with The Order of the Neo-Solar Temple when the three of them defeated The Colony and The Equinox on October 28. The stable would continue their winning streak when they defeated Equinox, Retail Dragon and Trik Davies on November 12. Five days later, Incoherence finally received their revenge when they defeated the Neo-Solar Temple. Also that night, the Temple lost again, this time teaming with Blind Rage, to Incoherence who teamed with Cheech and Cloudy.

The stable were unfortunate at the beginning of 2007 as they lost to Los Ice Creams on February 16. On April 22, however, the faction managed to defeat Andy Sumner, Drew Gulak and Tim Donst. On May 16, Hydra had his first singles match in months when he lost to Worker Ant. The next day, Black and Hydra defeated The Olsen Brothers. On June 22, Hydra participated in the fifth Young Lions Cup however he lost to MosCow in the first round. During the third night of the Young Lions Cup, the Temple defeated MosCow, Player Dos and Super Xtremo. On September 22, 2007, the Temple were once again defeated by Incoherence. On October 26, the Temple defeated Dragon Dragon USApe and MosCow.

On October 27, Hydra and Jigsaw defeated UltraMantis Black and Shane Storm. At CHIKARA's event The Sordid Perils of everyday Existence, Black seemingly turned on Hydra causing him to lose to Shane Storm whom Black would later align himself with. However heading in 2008, the Temple appeared functional. The Temple were defeated by The Colony on December 9, 2007.

On January 27, 2008, Hydra scored one of his biggest victories in CHIKARA when he defeated Moravian Greyhound and Pablo the Zombie Plantain in a triple-threat match. The Temple then participated in the King of Trios tournament until they were eliminated in the quarter-final. On April 19, 2008, UltraMantis defeated Tim Donst, whom he had dropped on his head in Donst's debut the previous year, with the Praying Mantis Bomb. After the match, the Neo-Solar Temple kidnapped the concussed Donst and managed to convince him to become the fourth member of the faction. However, this would all be revealed to be a plan created by Mike Quackenbush as he had sent Donst to infiltrate the Neo-Solar Temple in order to find out who had leaked the secret of the Chikara Special to Chris Hero. Quackenbush had been feuding with Hero and in the course of the feud, Quackenbush invented a move Hero could not break. After defeating him in a singles match, Quackenbush taught the move to every tecnico on the Chikara roster. However, on November 17, 2007, Hero had been able to break the hold and use it himself to win his feud against Equinox. On June 18, 2008, Donst left the Neo-Solar Temple and with information gathered undercover, he was able to reveal to Quackenbush that Shane Storm, Quackenbush's long time tag team partner, had been the one who had leaked the move and the counter to it to UltraMantis Black, who in turn taught the move to Hero. After being given an ultimatum by UltraMantis, Hydra left the Order with Donst and together they would form the tag team known as the Sea Donsters, resulting in the Neo-Solar Temple being dwindled down to a tag team.

==== The Sea Donsters (2008–2009) ====
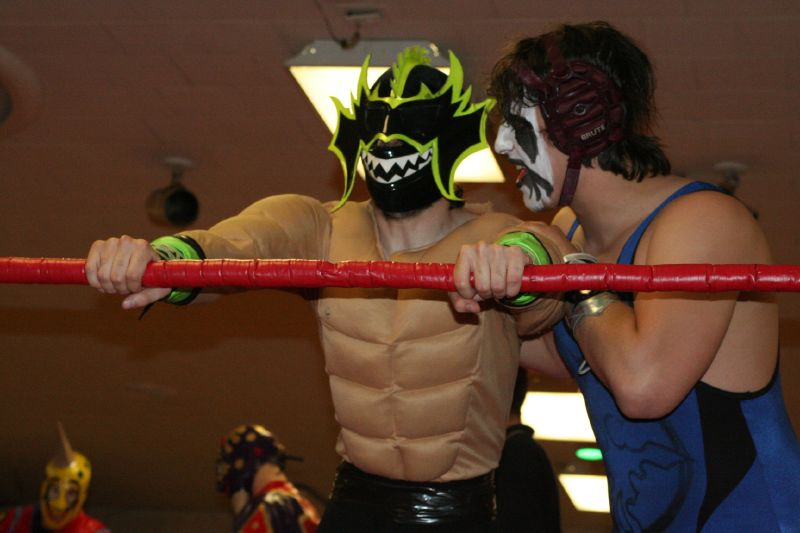
The Sea Donsters (Hydra, left, and Tim Donst, right) in 2008

On April 20, 2008, Hydra lost to Chuck Taylor. For one night only, The Temple and Sea Donsters briefly merged to defeat The Colony and Pantera on 17 May. Now a technico, The Sea Donsters made their tag team debut defeating Player Uno and Stupified the next day. On May 23, the Donsters were victorious against Grudyin and Tucor. The next day they defeated Los Ice Creams. The Sea Donsters teamed with UltraMantis Black to defeat Gran Akuma, Icarus and Chuck Taylor during the first night of the sixth addition of CHIKARA's Young Lion's Cup. Tim Donst then finally faced Black and was successful in his endeavours. On August 9, 2008 at CHIKARA's All that Glitters event, The Sea Donsters teamed in the main event (marking Hydra's first CHIKARA main event) in a losing effort when they challenged Incoherence for their Campenatos de Parejas (Tag team Championships) when the Temple interfered.

The Sea Donsters then began feuding with The Order of the Neo-Solar Temple, starting with a losing effort when they teamed with Mike Quackenbush in a six-man tag team match that saw the Temple team with Dr. Cube. On September 6, 2008, Hydra was defeated by Brodie Lee via a Big Boot. The next day, Hydra teamed with Helios and Incoherence to defeat The Neo-Solar Temple, TJ Cannon and Bruce Maxwell. The Sea Donsters seemingly appeared inactive until the pairing lost to two of the three members of The UnStable (Colin Delaney and STIGMA) on October 19. Individually Donst and Hydra participated in the Torneo Cybernetico, however both of them were eliminated in the first round by UltraMantis Black and STIGMA respectively. The next day (November 16, 2008), The Sea Donsters defeated Icarus and Gran Akuma. Finally, on December 12, 2008, The Sea Donsters faced The Order of the Neo-Solar Temple in a tag team match, which they won. The following night, Hydra defeated his former teacher Black whilst Donst was injured in a tag team match, thus starting a feud with STIGMA.

Following Donst's feud with STIGMA, the Donsters returned to action on February 21, 2009 teaming with Create-a-Wrestler in a losing effort to The Un-Stable. During the final night of CHIKARA's 2009 King of Trios, the Donsters participated in a tag team gauntlet that saw them pick up a victory over Tony Kozina and Ryan Drago however they were eliminated by The Order of the Neo-Solar Temple. Mike Quackenbush and Jigsaw won the match in the end. The pairing were then against each other when Player Dos, STIGMA, Tim Donst & Brodie Lee defeated Player Uno, Vin Gerard, Hydra and Buck Hawke on April 25, 2008. On Night 3 of the Young Lions Cup, the Sea Donsters teamed with KC "Cloudy" Day and wrestled Player Uno, Yellow Dog and Dasher Hatfield, which Hydra's team lost. After the match Tim Donst attacked Hydra, Donst said that he was tired of losing and that he was the backbone of the team, which ended the Sea Donsters. On November 21, 2009, Hydra wrestled Tim Donst in a Loser Leaves CHIKARA match at Throwing Life's Instructions Away, which Hydra lost, forcing him to leave the company.

=== Independent circuit (2008–2012) ===
In 2008, Dinsmore performed under the name of Kenny Butterscotch for BBOW (Bad Brothers of Wrestling) at Colgate University in Hamilton, NY, losing to Kerman the German.

In 2009, Dinsmore would reprise the role of the erstwhile Kenny Butterscotch, changing his name to Leslie and doing job matches for Ring of Honor. In a televised appearance, he teamed with Orange Cassidy in the first iteration of the Flavors of the Week, losing to the American Wolves for Ring of Honor Wrestling on HDNet.

2010 saw Butterscotch make appearances for Ring of Honor school offshoot, Pro Wrestling Respect, and in 2011, he would appear as a manager for Steve "The Turtle" Weiner for Beyond Wrestling.

In the summer of 2012, Butterscotch formed a tag team with Avery Boysenberry called the Flames of Love and appeared at a number of shows for the Wrestling is Fun! promotion. On the Wrestling Is YouTube channel, the Flames of Love starred in their own web series, "Flavors of the Weak." Employing a meta-narrative theretofore unexplored in professional wrestling, Butterscotch and Boysenberry played themselves as characters, their on-screen personas when the camera was running, and their wrestling personas, "The Rising Flame" and "Dapper Donnie," respectively. The premise of the show was that Butterscotch and Boysenberry were childhood friends determined to make it in pro wrestling after an in-their-minds-successful career in their backyard promotion, CCW (Cream (of the) Crop Wrestling). The web series explores their attempts to break into the wrestling business, from hiring a manager (the snake oil salesman with a heart, "Gorgeous" Giordaan Gordon) to washing cars and hiring themselves out to birthday parties in order to raise money.

At the end of 2012, the Flames of Love tag team dissolved.

=== Return (2021-2024) ===
Hydra would return to professional wrestling in summer 2021 for LVAC (Lehigh Valley Apparel Creations), quickly inserting himself into a feud with heel commissioner Chris Reject. During this time, he also began teaming with Billy Avery as the Mighty Seamen at PWE (Pro Wrestling Explosion) out of Philadelphia, Pennsylvania.

It was announced that Hydra would put his mask on the line in a Lucha de Apuestas 10-person tag team match at LVAC's October 21, 2022 event.

On October 21, 2022 at LVAC, Hydra and his team, consisting of UltraMantis Black, Crossbones, Cheeseburger, and Clara Carreras, lost a Lucha de Apuestas match against Billy Avery, Channing Thomas, CPA, Ryan Mooney, and Gran Akuma. Following the match, Hydra unmasked, revealing himself to be Leslie Butterscotch.

== Championships and accomplishments ==
- Pro Wrestling Illustrated
  - Ranked No. 495 of the top 500 singles wrestlers in the PWI 500 in 2008

== Luchas de Apuestas record ==
Winner (wager)	Loser (wager)	Location	Event	Date
Billy Avery (career)	Hydra (mask)	Bethlehem, Pennsylvania	LVAC Let's Hang Out '22 (Spooky Edition)	October 21, 2022
