= New Century Club (Utica, New York) =

- U.S. National Register of Historic Places
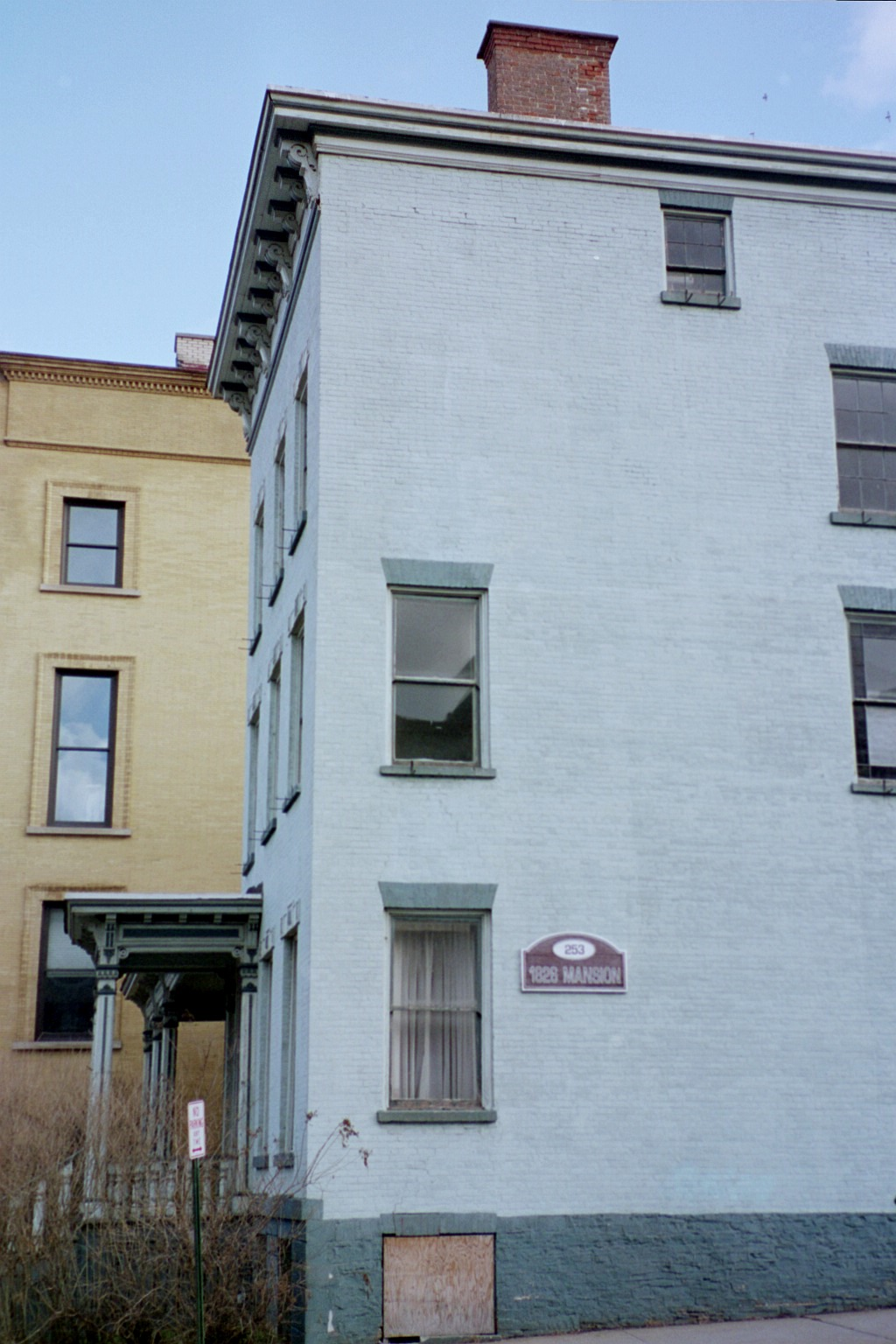

- Location within New York Location within the United States
- Location: Utica, New York
- Coordinates: 43°5′58″N 75°14′6″W
- Built: 1826
- Architect: Frederick H. Gouge
- Architectural style: Greek Revival, Renaissance, Italianate
- NRHP reference No.: 85002289
- Added to NRHP: September 12, 1985

The New Century Club is located at 253 Genesee Street in Utica, New York. It was added to the National Register of Historic Places in September, 1985. It is architecturally significant for its Greek Revival architecture, once characteristic of this part of the city of Utica. It is socially significant as the home of the New Century Club, a women's civic organization established in 1893 and "responsible throughout the early twentieth century for projects that notably improved Utica's educational system, outdoor recreational facilities and youth justice system."

It was a work of Utica architect Frederick H. Gouge.

== See also ==
- New Century Club (Wilmington, Delaware)
- National Register of Historic Places listings in Oneida County, New York
