= Byington Mill (Frisbie & Stansfield Knitting Company) =

- U.S. National Register of Historic Places
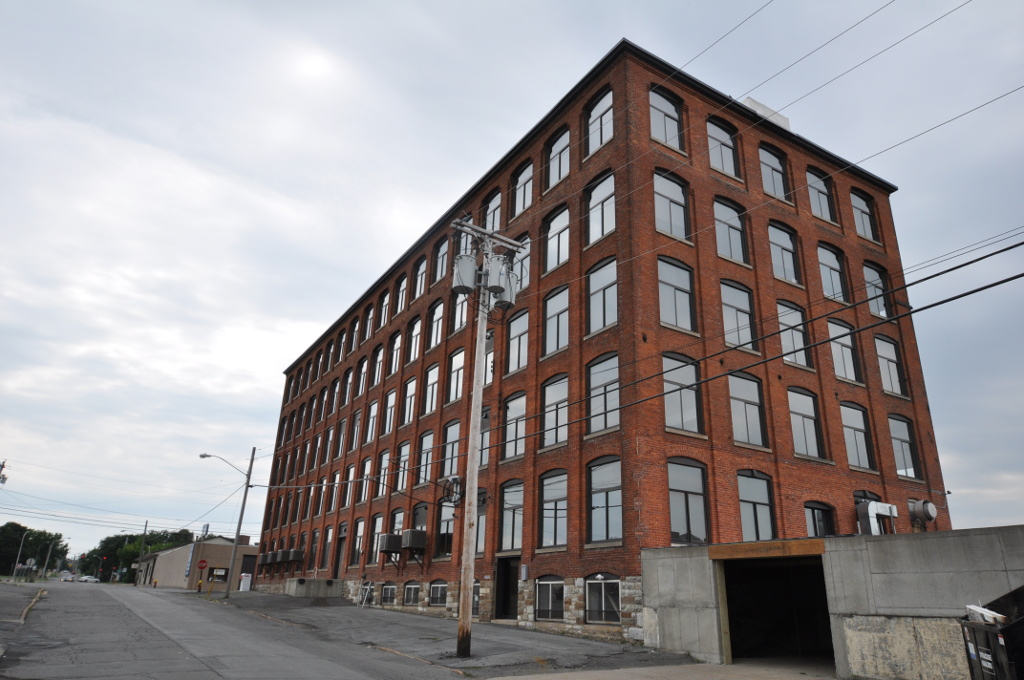

- Location within New York Location within the United States
- Location: 421-423 Broad St., Utica, New York
- Coordinates: 43°6′9″N 75°13′20″W
- Area: 0.6 acres (0.24 ha)
- Built: 1910
- Architect: Gouge, Frederick H.
- Architectural style: Early Commercial
- NRHP reference No.: 93000458
- Added to NRHP: May 27, 1993

Byington Mill (Frisbie & Stansfield Knitting Company), also known as the J. A. Firsching & Son Building, is a historic knitting mill located at Utica in Oneida County, New York.

It was designed by Utica architect Frederick H. Gouge and was built in 1910 as a four-story structure; a fifth floor was added before 1929. It consists of a rectangular main block built of brick load bearing walls, a heavy timber frame, and a flat roof. A two-story office wing and one story shop section was originally attached to the building. However, this addition was demolished in 2007 when the city erroneously issued a permit to do so. It was listed on the National Register of Historic Places in 1993.

The city of Utica repossessed the building in 1983 and sold it to the Cobblestone Construction Co. in 1999. Cobblestone struggled to attract tenants, and left the building in 2008. The building was purchased and restored by Pezzolanella Construction in 2009 for $315,972.
