= Hurd & Fitzgerald Building =

- U.S. National Register of Historic Places
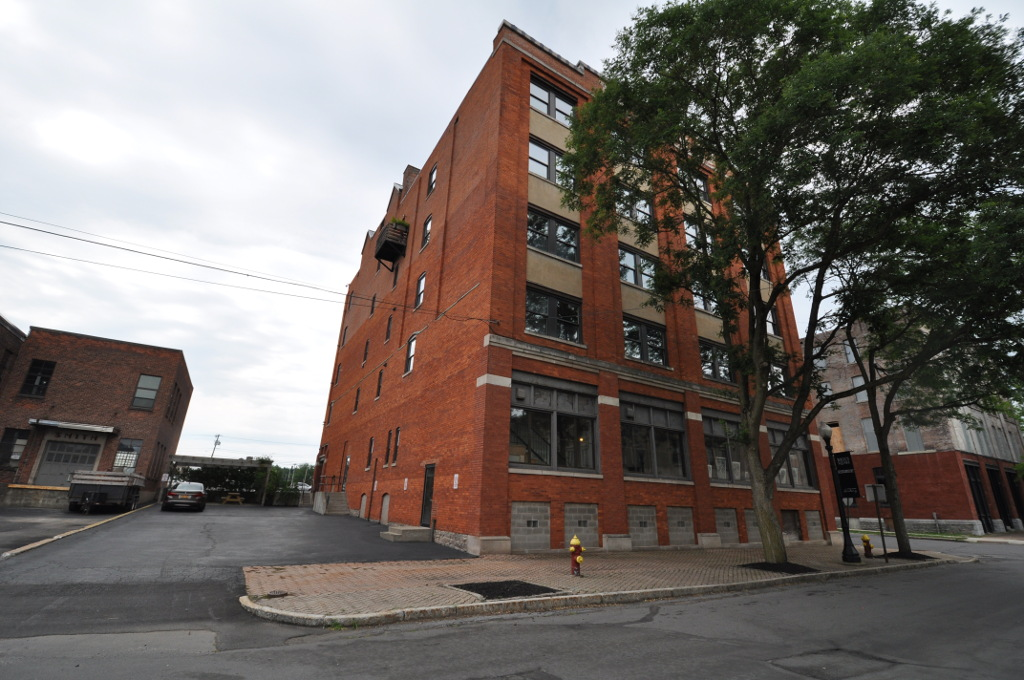

- Location within New York Location within the United States
- Location: 400 Main St., Utica, New York
- Coordinates: 43°6′12″N 75°13′24″W
- Area: 0.2 acres (0.081 ha)
- Built: 1911
- Architect: Gouge, Frederick H.
- Architectural style: Early Commercial
- NRHP reference No.: 93000500
- Added to NRHP: June 25, 1993

Hurd & Fitzgerald Building, also known as the Hurd Sales Company, is a historic factory building located at Utica in Oneida County, New York. It was built in 1911 and is a five-story, rectangular brick building built for a shoe and rubber goods manufacturer. It was a work of Utica architect Frederick H. Gouge.

It was listed on the National Register of Historic Places in 1993.
