= John C. Hieber Building =

Historic commercial building in New York, United States

- U.S. National Register of Historic Places
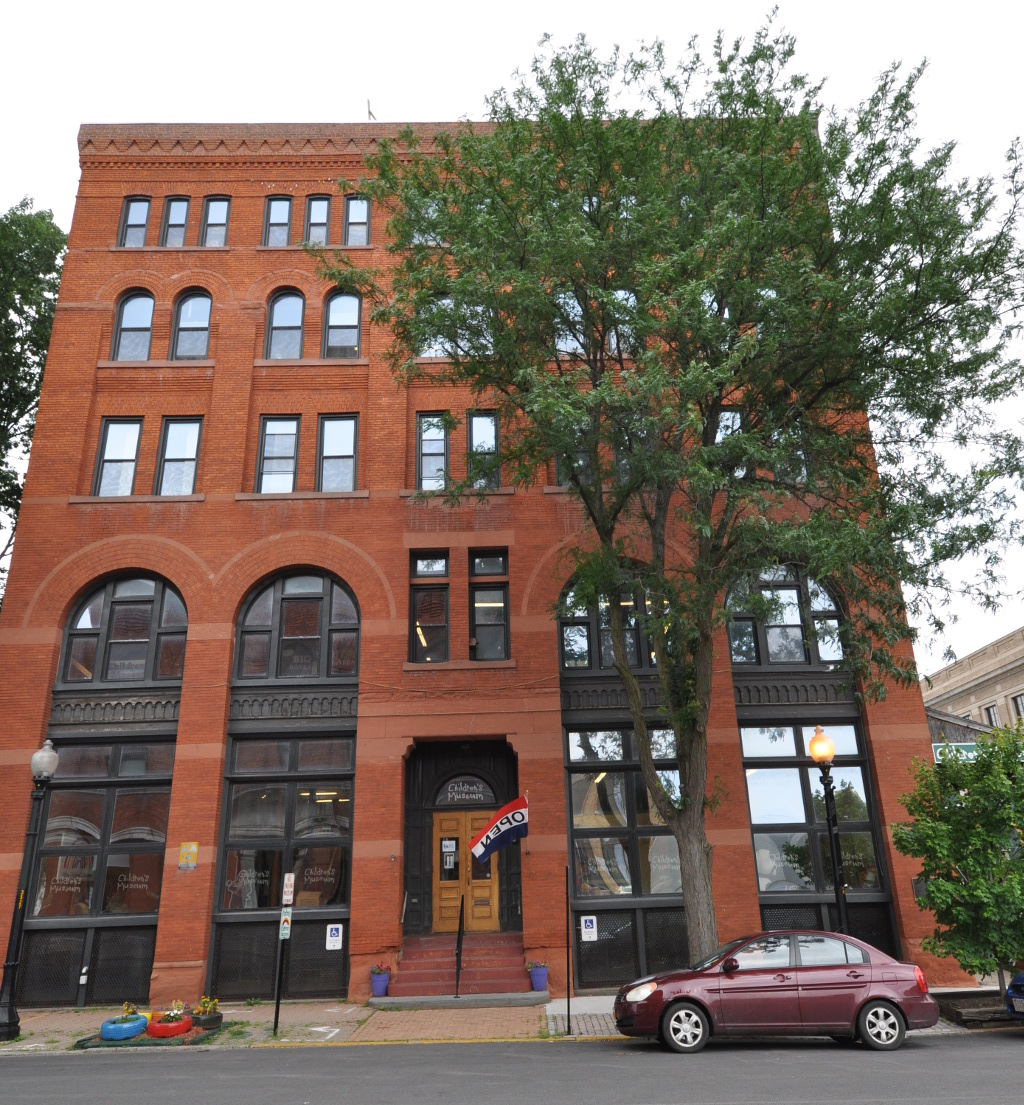

- Location within New York Location within the United States
- Location: 311 Main St., Utica, New York
- Coordinates: 43°6′15″N 75°13′29″W
- Area: less than one acre
- Built: 1893
- Architect: Frederick H. Gouge
- Architectural style: Renaissance
- NRHP reference No.: 07000756
- Added to NRHP: July 24, 2007

The John C. Hieber Building is a historic commercial building located at Utica in Oneida County, New York.

== Description and history ==
It was built in 1893, and is a five-story, rectangular, flat-roofed, red brick structure, 60 feet by 100 feet, with a random ashlar stone foundation. It was designed by Utica architect Frederick H. Gouge as a combined sales and warehouse facility.

The building was owned by the Utica Children's Museum from 1979 to 2020, when Robert Esche's development company Mohawk Valley Garden bought the building, and the museum relocated. The first floor is now occupied by a restaurant.

It was listed on the National Register of Historic Places on July 24, 2007.
