= DGUSA Open The Northern Gate =

2010 Dragon Gate USA event

Open The Northern Gate
- Promotion: Dragon Gate USA
- Date: May 7, 2010 (aired May 7, 2010)
- City: Windsor, Ontario, Canada
- Venue: The Windsor Armoury
- Attendance: ca. 200

Open The Northern Gate was a professional wrestling event produced by Dragon Gate USA.

#	Matches	Stipulations
Dark	Kyle O'Reilly defeated Brent B	
1	CHIKARA Sekigun (Jigsaw & Mike Quackenbush) defeat KAMIKAZE USA (Akira Tozawa & Gran Akuma)	
2	Jon Moxley (c) defeats Phil Atlas	FIP World Heavyweight Championship Match
3	CIMA defeats Jimmy Jacobs	
4	Masaaki Mochizuki defeats Naruki Doi	
5	Jon Bolen & Tyson Dux defeat Brad Martin & Xtremo	
6	Masato Yoshino defeats Dragon Kid	Best 2 out of 3 falls
7	KAMIKAZE USA (SHINGO & YAMATO) defeat WORLD-1 (BxB Hulk & PAC)	
