= Doyle Hardware Building =

- U.S. National Register of Historic Places
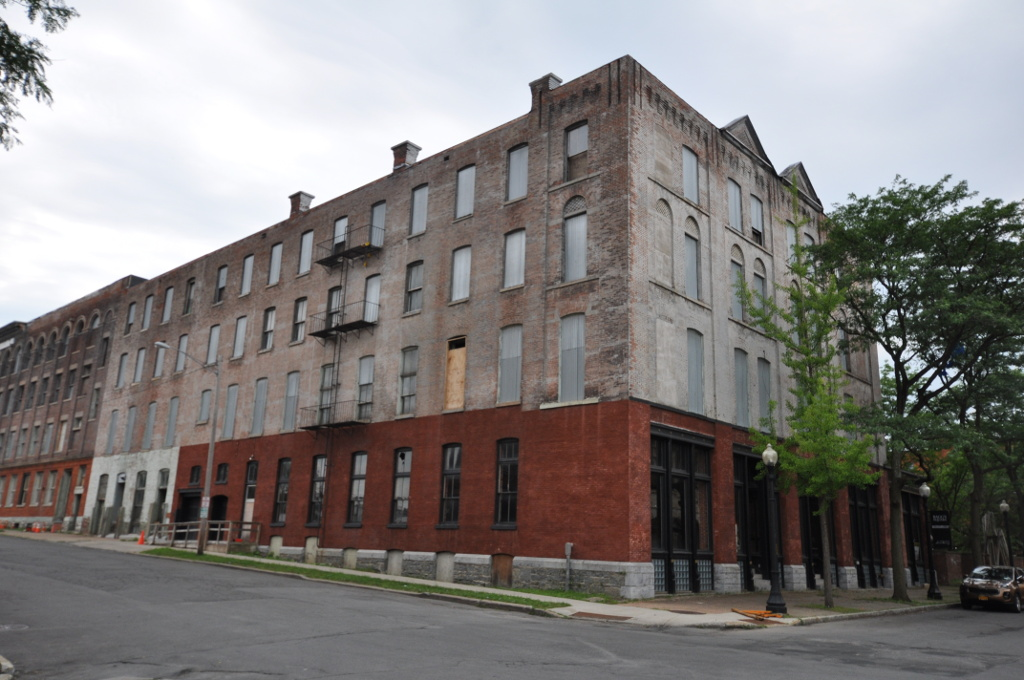

- Location within New York Location within the United States
- Location: 330-334 Main St., Utica, New York
- Coordinates: 43°6′13″N 75°13′27″W
- Area: 0.5 acres (0.20 ha)
- Built: 1881
- Architect: Gouge, Frederick H.
- Architectural style: Early Commercial
- NRHP reference No.: 93000498
- Added to NRHP: June 10, 1993

Doyle Hardware Building is a historic factory building located at 330 Main St in Utica in Oneida County, New York. It was built in three sections between 1881 and 1901. The entire four story complex is approximately 100 feet by 260 feet with 82,000 square feet of space. It was a work of Utica architect Frederick H. Gouge.

Built originally as a clothing factory, in 1934 it became a factory for manufacture of spark plugs, and in 1947 became home to Utica Distributing Company, later Doyle Hardware.

It was listed on the National Register of Historic Places in 1993.

== Redevelopment ==
City officials and local business saw the building as important to the revitalization of the surrounding historic neighborhood, which includes Union Station, also on the National Register of Historic Places.

The building was purchased in 2007 by a developer who planned to convert the building into a restaurant, commercial office space and loft apartments. A restaurant and bar opened in 2010 but closed in 2012 with no other development of the building occurring. The building went into foreclosure and the developer declared bankruptcy on Jan 31, 2013. The building was listed for sale in 2015.
