= Utica Daily Press Building =

Historic commercial building in New York, United States

- U.S. National Register of Historic Places
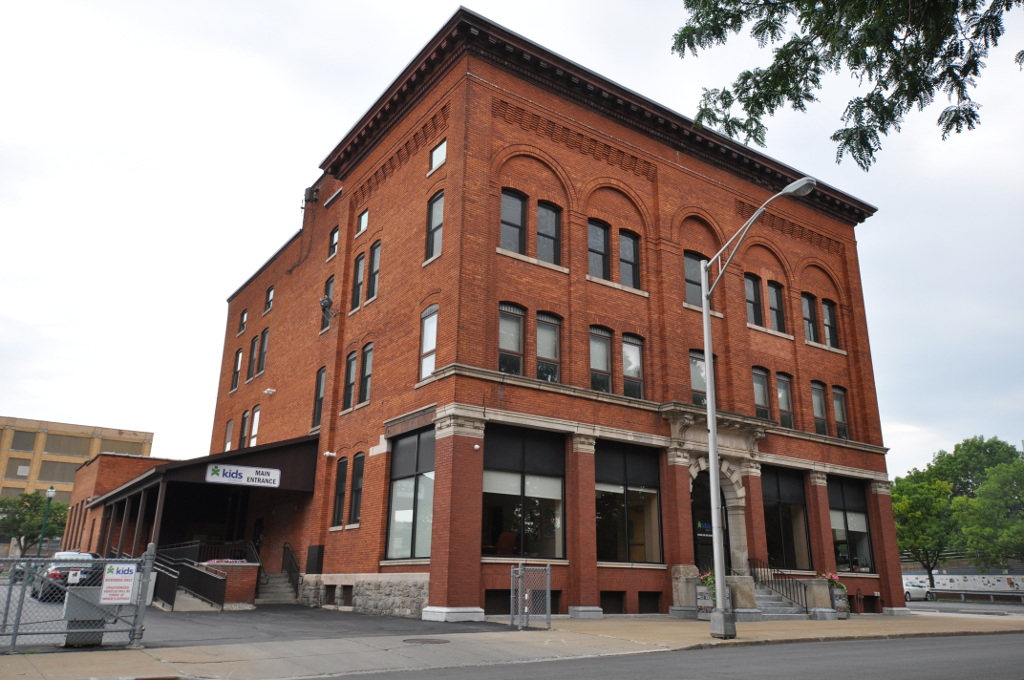

- Location within New York Location within the United States
- Location: 310-312 Main St., Utica, New York
- Coordinates: 43°06′14″N 75°13′28″W
- Area: 0.3 acres (0.12 ha)
- Built: 1905
- Architect: Frederick H. Gouge
- Architectural style: Early Commercial
- NRHP reference No.: 93000501
- Added to NRHP: June 10, 1993

Utica Daily Press Building, also known as Gaffney Communications, is a historic building located at Utica in Oneida County, New York. It was built in 1904-1905 as offices and printing plant for the Utica Daily Press. It consists of a 3 1/2-story rectangular brick main block, with two 1-story additions.

It was listed on the National Register of Historic Places in 1993.
