= Utica Children's Museum =

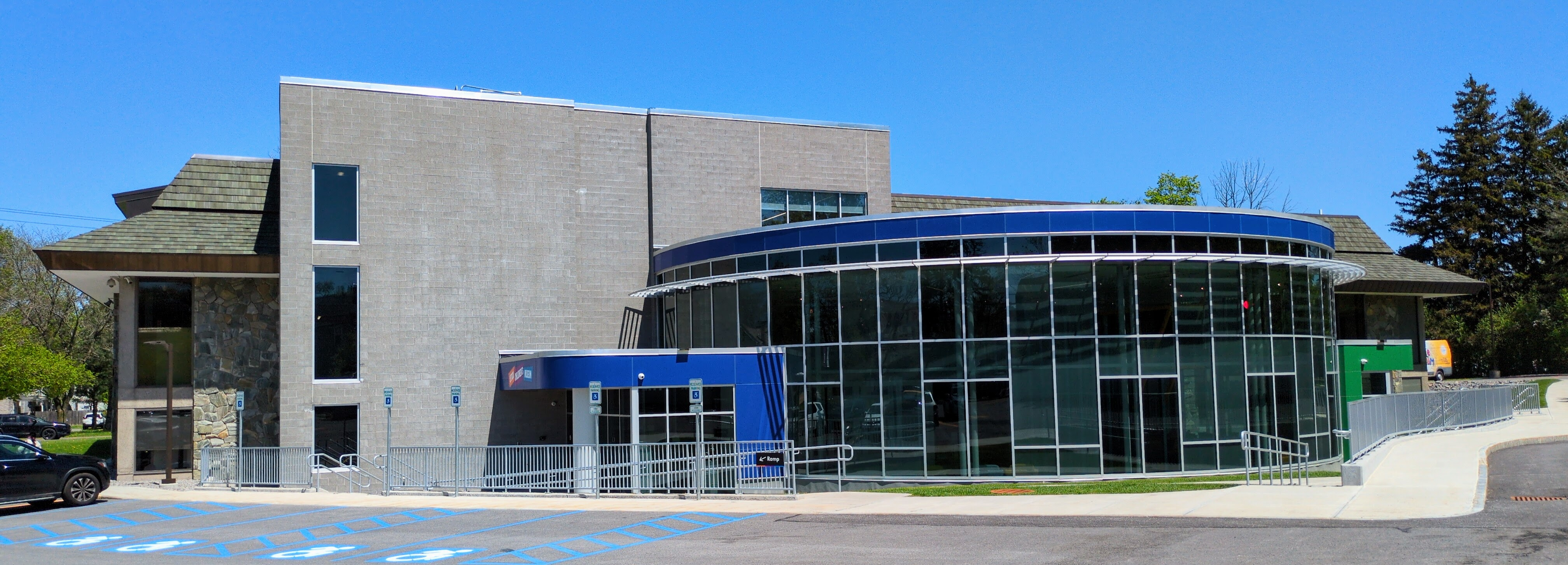
- New museum building as of May 2025
- Former names: Junior Museum of Oneida County; Mohawk Valley Museum; Children's Museum of History, Natural History & Science
- Established: 1 August 1963
- Location: Utica, New York
- Coordinates: 43°5′13″N 75°15′11″W
- Type: Children's museum
- Collection size: 7 galleries and 60+ exhibits
- Website: uticachildrensmuseum.org

The Utica Children's Museum is a children's museum in Utica, New York. It closed its old downtown location in 2020 at the start of the COVID-19 pandemic. Its new location along Utica's Memorial Parkway opened on May 1, 2025.

== History ==
The museum was founded on August 1, 1963, by the Utica Junior League. Originally called the "Junior Museum of Oneida County", it was housed in the basement of the Utica Public Library, and its only exhibit was a replica of an Iroquois longhouse. In 1965, the museum moved to a former city Parks department building in Roscoe Conkling Park and remained there for nine years. In 1974 it moved into the upper floor of the Valley View golf course, also within Roscoe Conkling Park. In 1975 its name was changed to the Mohawk Valley Museum.

In 1979, the museum moved into the John C. Hieber Building, where it stayed until 2020. Initially the museum occupied the first floor and half of the second floor of the Hieber Building, but it soon expanded to three floors. The fourth floor was opened in 2002 with help from NASA and the Office of Science. The Junior League of Utica disbanded in 2006. In 2017, the museum approved a managed services contract with local non-profit Kids Oneida, which would rename itself ICAN in 2019.

In March 2020, ICAN announced that the museum would be relocating to a new building on the Memorial Parkway, located at the former location of the Utica City School District administrative offices. The COVID-19 pandemic caused the museum to close its old location sooner than expected. Through the pandemic, it held virtual programming and visits by a bookmobile-like van called it calls the "Mobile Museum". Groundbreaking on the new building was held in October 2021. The museum reopened on May 1, 2025.
