= Mike Quackenbush =

American writer and professional wrestler

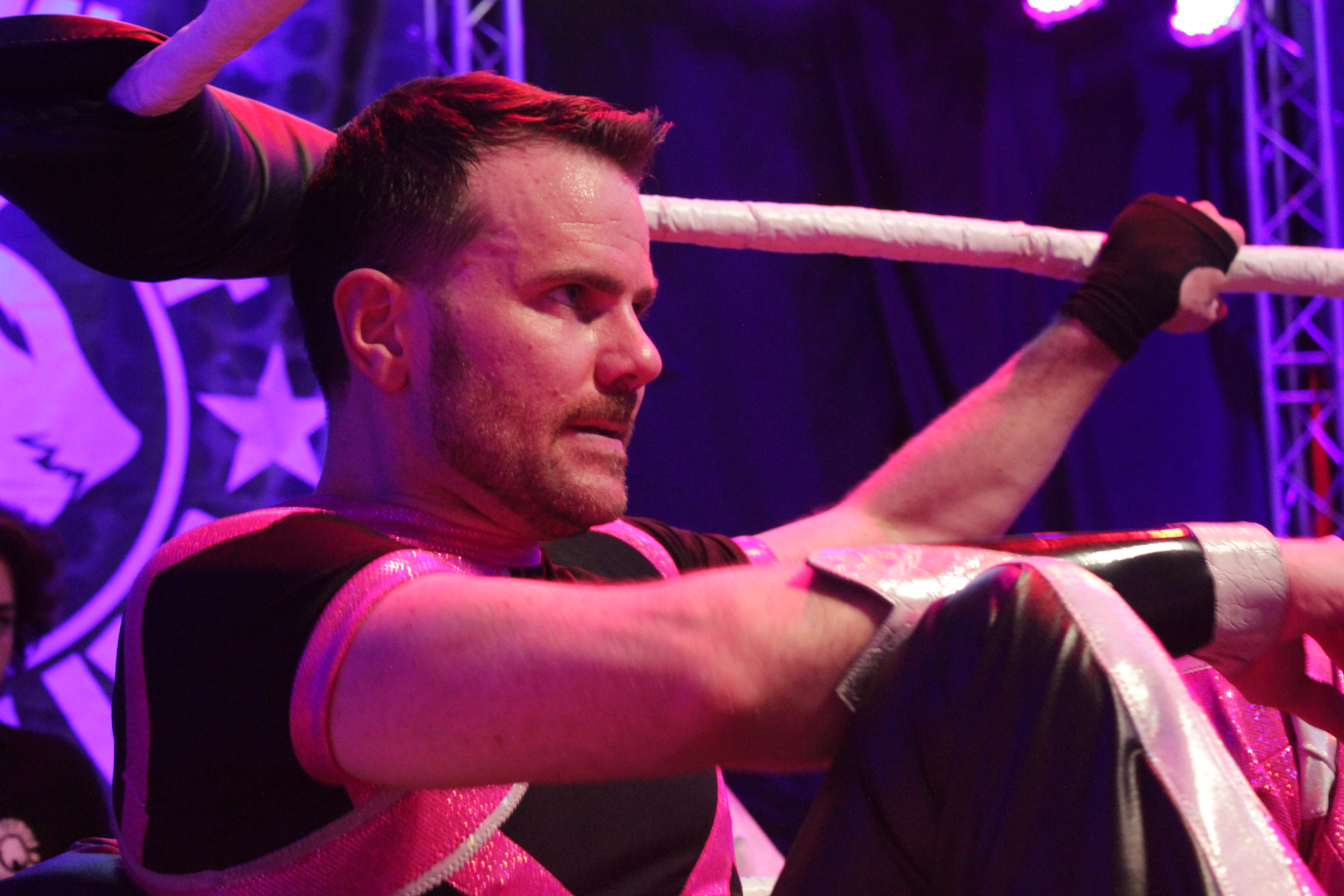
- Quackenbush in 2019

Personal information
- Born: Michael Spillane; March 18, 1976 (age 50) West Lawn, Pennsylvania, U.S.

Professional wrestling career
- Ring name(s): M. Quackenbush; Mike Quackenbush; Spyrazul
- Billed height: 6 ft 0 in (1.83 m)
- Billed weight: 191 lb (87 kg)
- Billed from: West Lawn, Pennsylvania
- Trained by: Ace Darling; Reckless Youth; Skayde
- Debut: May 20, 1994

Michael Spillane (born March 18, 1976) is an American podcaster, author, professional wrestling trainer, professional wrestling promoter, and semi-retired professional wrestler, better known by his ring name Mike Quackenbush.

He has hosted several podcasts and video podcasts including The Grizzly Bear Egg Cafe, Chikara Podcast-A-Go-Go, Deep Blue Something, The Trending Show, Daddy on Board, Kayfabe 2.0, and Til We Make It. He is also the sole content contributor to Quackenbush on Camelot, a news resource for the goings-on at the dinner theater franchise Medieval Times and renaissance fairs. Quackenbush has written seven books including the two memoirs Headquarters (2001) and Secret Identity: Essays From Both My Lives (2004). Both memoirs were re-released as e-books for the Kindle in May 2010, and a few years later in 2017, he released 7 Keys to Becoming a Better Performer: A Book for Fellow Pro-Wrestlers. From 1998 to 2008, Quackenbush penned a regular column titled "From Bell To Bell" for The Wrestler magazine and "The International Report" for Pro Wrestling Illustrated, among other publishing credits.

In wrestling, Quackenbush is well known for being the promoter of Chikara and head trainer of its Wrestle Factory, a promotion and school he co-founded in 2002 with Reckless Youth. Quackenbush is also noted for his 25 year in-ring career on the independent wrestling circuit, during which he became a former NWA World Junior Heavyweight Champion and CZW World Junior Heavyweight Champion. In 2016, Sports Illustrated included Quackenbush on their list of the Top 101 Wrestlers of All Time.

== Professional wrestling career ==
=== Early career ===
Quackenbush began taking bookings for multiple local independent companies, including PCW and SCW in late 1998. Growing up, Quackenbush idolized Japanese professional wrestler Jushin Thunder Liger and adopted the nickname "Lightning" in tribute to him. Entering the business untrained, Quackenbush received training from wrestler Ace Darling, who took Quackenbush in as his protege. In 1999, he was ranked #128 by Pro Wrestling Illustrated in the annual PWI 500 as well as being named the June Flavour of the Month by the publication. Quackenbush eventually befriended independent wrestlers Reckless Youth and Don Montoya. They began teaming together as a trio, dubbed The Black T-shirt Squad (abbreviated to The BTS), due to all three wearing black t-shirts in their wrestling attire, by fellow wrestlers, which eventually was used as their ring name. Quackenbush started taking most bookings with his fellow stablemates opposed to performing as a singles wrestler.

=== Combat Zone Wrestling (1999, 2004–2005) ===
Quackenbush first appeared in Combat Zone Wrestling (CZW) on June 19, 1999, at Down In Flames, where he defeated Reckless Youth and Ric Blade in the opening three-way dance. On May 14, 2005, he won CZW's Best of the Best 5 elimination tournament in Philadelphia, Pennsylvania, after defeating Arik Cannon, Claudio Castagnoli, B-Boy, Kevin Steen and Super Dragon. He also held the CZW World Junior Heavyweight Championship twice.

=== Chikara (2002–2020) ===
Quackenbush founded a professional wrestling school branded The Wrestle Factory in January 2002 along with Reckless Youth, where both men were appointed as head trainers for the school. They opened the promotion Chikara in May of the same year. At the inaugural show on May 25, 2002, Quackenbush teamed with fellow BTS stablemates Reckless Youth and Don Montoya in a match, where they defeated the Gold Bond Mafia (CM Punk, Colt Cabana and Chris Hero). On the last show of 2002 Quackenbush finished his first feud in Chikara, by pinning Mitch Ryder. The following year Quackenbush formed the SuperFriends tag team with Chris Hero and went the whole year undefeated. In 2004 Quackenbush teamed up with Team F.I.S.T. (Icarus and Gran Akuma) and started a feud with the Toxic Trio (Eddie Kingston, BlackJack Marciano and Jigsaw). The two teams faced each other on May 22, 2004, at Aniversario 3: Dodging the Sophomore Jinx, where Quackenbush and F.I.S.T. were victorious and as per stipulation of the match, Kingston and Marciano were shaved bald. In the spring of 2004 Quackenbush started disappearing from Chikara shows, just as Larry Sweeney's Sweet 'n' Sour International rose to prominence. He returned on October 30 during the first annual torneo cibernetico match at The Cibernetico Cometh under a mask and the ringname Spyrazul as a member of the Sweet 'n' Sour International. However, at the end of the match Spyrazul attacked his own teammates, removed his mask and walked out on Sweeney, who ended up being pinned by Jigsaw to end the match.

In March 2005 the Chikara Wrestle Factory assumed control of the Combat Zone Wrestling wrestling school. Quackenbush served as head trainer of the joint facility for the two-year duration, until the schools separated in March 2007. Quackenbush re-formed his SuperFriends tag team with Chris Hero and together the two of them entered the 2005 Tag World Grand Prix. They would make it to the finals of the tournament, where they were defeated by AC/CC (Arik Cannon and Claudio Castagnoli), after Hero turned on Quackenbush. Together Hero, Castagnoli and Cannon would form the highly successful stable and later tag team The Kings of Wrestling, with whom Quackenbush, Reckless Youth and Jigsaw would feud with the rest of the year.

In late 2005 Quackenbush suffered a career-threatening back injury. He would make his in-ring return on March 18, 2006, at a Westside Xtreme Wrestling event, where he defeated Ares for the wXw World Heavyweight Championship. In his Chikara return on March 31, he would drop the title back to Ares. He then recruited Jigsaw and Shane Storm to help him battle the Kings of Wrestling, who had replaced Arik Cannon with Quackenbush's former partners Team F.I.S.T. Quackenbush set his sights on Chris Hero and defeated Gran Akuma and Icarus with his new finishing maneuver Quackendriver III. At the conclusion of the year Quackenbush, Storm and Jigsaw saved Claudio Castagnoli from a beatdown at the hands of his Kings of Wrestling partners.

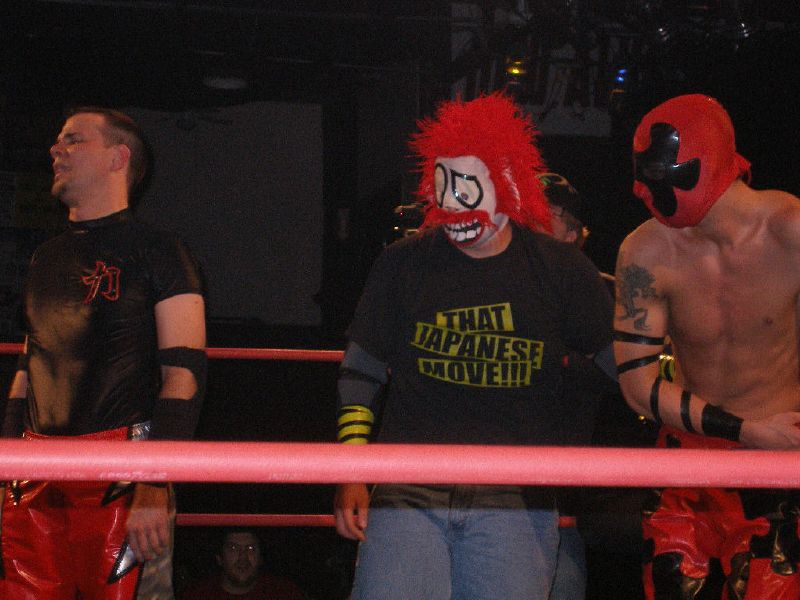
(Left to right) Quackenbush, Shane Storm and Jigsaw, the 2007 King of Trios

2007 started with Quackenbush, Jigsaw and Storm defeating Team Canada (Jagged, Shane Matthews and Max Boyer), Team TNA (Alex Shelley, Chris Sabin and Sonjay Dutt), Team Mucha Lucha (Lince Dorado, El Pantera and Sicodelico, Jr.) and finally Miyawaki, Yoshiaki Yago and Kudo to win the inaugural King of Trios tournament. The following month on March 25 Claudio Castagnoli defeated Quackenbush to win the right to represent Chikara in the first ever King of Europe Cup. That same month Chikara Podcast–A–Go–Go was launched. The weekly video podcast debuts a new episode every Monday night and is available through iTunes, YouTube and other online outlets.

On April 22, 2007, Quackenbush refereed a match between former partners Chris Hero and Claudio Castagnoli and counted the pinfall that forced Castagnoli to re-join the Kings of Wrestling. The following month Quackenbush faced Hero in a match two years in the making and defeated him after debuting a new submission maneuver, the Chikara Special.

Following the match, Quackenbush announced that since he knew Hero would never be able to break the Chikara Special, he would teach it and the counter to it to every tecnico wrestler on the Chikara roster. However, to Quackenbush's amazement it did not take long for Hero to break the hold and apply it himself in a match against Equinox. In order to find out who leaked the move, Quackenbush sent Tim Donst to infiltrate the rudo stable the Order of the Neo-Solar Temple, led by UltraMantis Black. Meanwhile, Quackenbush and Shane Storm gained three straight victories, which would give them the right to challenge for the Campeonatos de Parejas (Tag Team Championship), but on June 14, 2008, Donst returned from his assignment and informed Quackenbush that his partner Shane Storm had been the one who leaked the move to UltraMantis Black, who in turn taught it to Hero. Quackenbush attacked Storm, who would find new partners in Vin Gerard and Colin Delaney, while renaming himself Stigma.

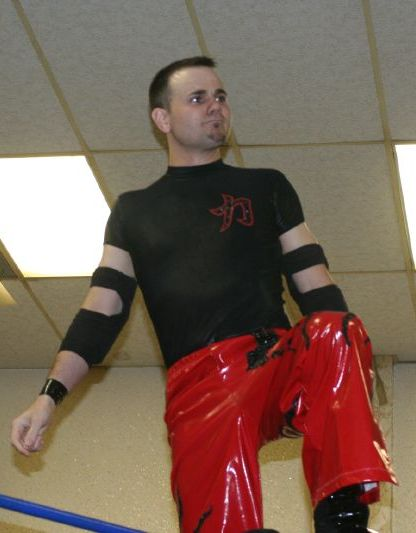
Quackenbush at a Chikara show in June 2008

On September 7, 2008, Jigsaw, who had unmasked himself while in Ring of Honor, returned to Chikara and saved Quackenbush and Donst from the UnStable. Quackenbush returned the favor the following month, but refused to re-form the team with Jigsaw until he put his mask back on. On December 14 at the season seven finale Quackenbush and Jigsaw, under a mask, defeated Stigma and Delaney in a tag team match. In early 2009 Quackenbush and Jigsaw gained three points, but were unable to defeat the Campeones de Parejas The Osirian Portal (Amasis and Ophidian) on April 25. After May's anniversary shows Quackenbush decided to take some time off from in-ring competition in order to heal his injured back.

In 2010 Quackenbush became embroiled in a feud with Bruderschaft des Kreuzes (BDK), who had formed on the final show of 2009 and were threatening to take over Chikara, with its members quickly winning the Young Lions Cup, Campeonatos de Parejas and King of Trios, while also having one of its members as the Chikara Director of Fun. After UltraMantis Black declared that rudos and tecnicos would have to come together in order to stop BDK, Quackenbush announced on August 11 that he would join his seven-man team facing BDK in the annual torneo cibernetico match on October 23. After defeating The Young Bucks (Matt and Nick Jackson) and BDK members Lince Dorado and Pinkie Sanchez, Quackenbush and Jigsaw were looking to get a shot at BDK's Claudio Castagnoli and Ares and their Campeonatos de Parejas. However, on August 27 Quackenbush and Jigsaw failed in their attempt at getting a third point by losing to BDK members Daizee Haze and Sara Del Rey, after some shady officiating from the stable's own referee Derek Sabato. The following day Quackenbush and Jigsaw restarted their march towards three points by defeating the House of Truth (Josh Raymond and Christian Abel). On September 18 they picked up their second point by defeating BDK's Lince Dorado and Tim Donst. On October 23 Quackenbush represented Chikara in the torneo cibernetico match, where the company's originals faced BDK. He managed to eliminate Tim Donst from the match after countering his Inverted Chikara Special into the original Chikara Special, but was immediately afterwards eliminated himself by BDK's Claudio Castagnoli. The following day Quackenbush and Jigsaw once again failed in their attempt at getting their third point in a match against BDK members Pinkie Sanchez and Tursas. This failure led to Quackenbush's and Jigsaw's former partner Stigma reminding them that he and Quackenbush still had the three points they had earned two and a half years earlier, but Quackenbush made it clear that he wanted to win the Campeonatos de Parejas with Jigsaw, not Stigma. On November 22 Quackenbush and Jigsaw competed in a four-way elimination match with Sara Del Rey and Daizee Haze, The Osirian Portal and F.I.S.T. (Icarus and Chuck Taylor) and after eliminating all three teams, finally earned the three points needed in order to challenge for the Campeonatos de Parejas. On December 12, 2010, at the season nine finale Reality is Relative Quackenbush and Jigsaw cashed in their points and defeated Ares and Castagnoli two falls to one to win the Campeonatos de Parejas for the first time. Quackenbush and Jigsaw made their first successful defense of the title on February 19, 2011, defeating The Batiri (Obariyon and Kodama). For the 2011 King of Trios, Quackenbush and Jigsaw formed a trio with Japanese joshi legend Manami Toyota, who had made her Chikara debut alongside Quackenbush the previous September, and on April 15 defeated Amazing Red, Joel Maximo and Wil Maximo in their first round match. The following day, the trio was eliminated from the tournament in the quarterfinal stage by Team Michinoku Pro (Dick Togo, Great Sasuke and Jinsei Shinzaki). On September 18, Quackenbush and Jigsaw lost the Campeonatos de Parejas to F.I.S.T. (Chuck Taylor and Johnny Gargano) in their third defense. From May to October 2011, Quackenbush took part in 12 Large: Summit, a tournament used to determine the first ever Chikara Grand Champion. Quackenbush ended up winning his block of the tournament with a record of four wins and one loss to set up a final match with the winner of the other block, Eddie Kingston. On November 13 at Chikara's first internet pay-per-view, High Noon, Quackenbush was defeated by Kingston in a match to determine the first Chikara Grand Champion.

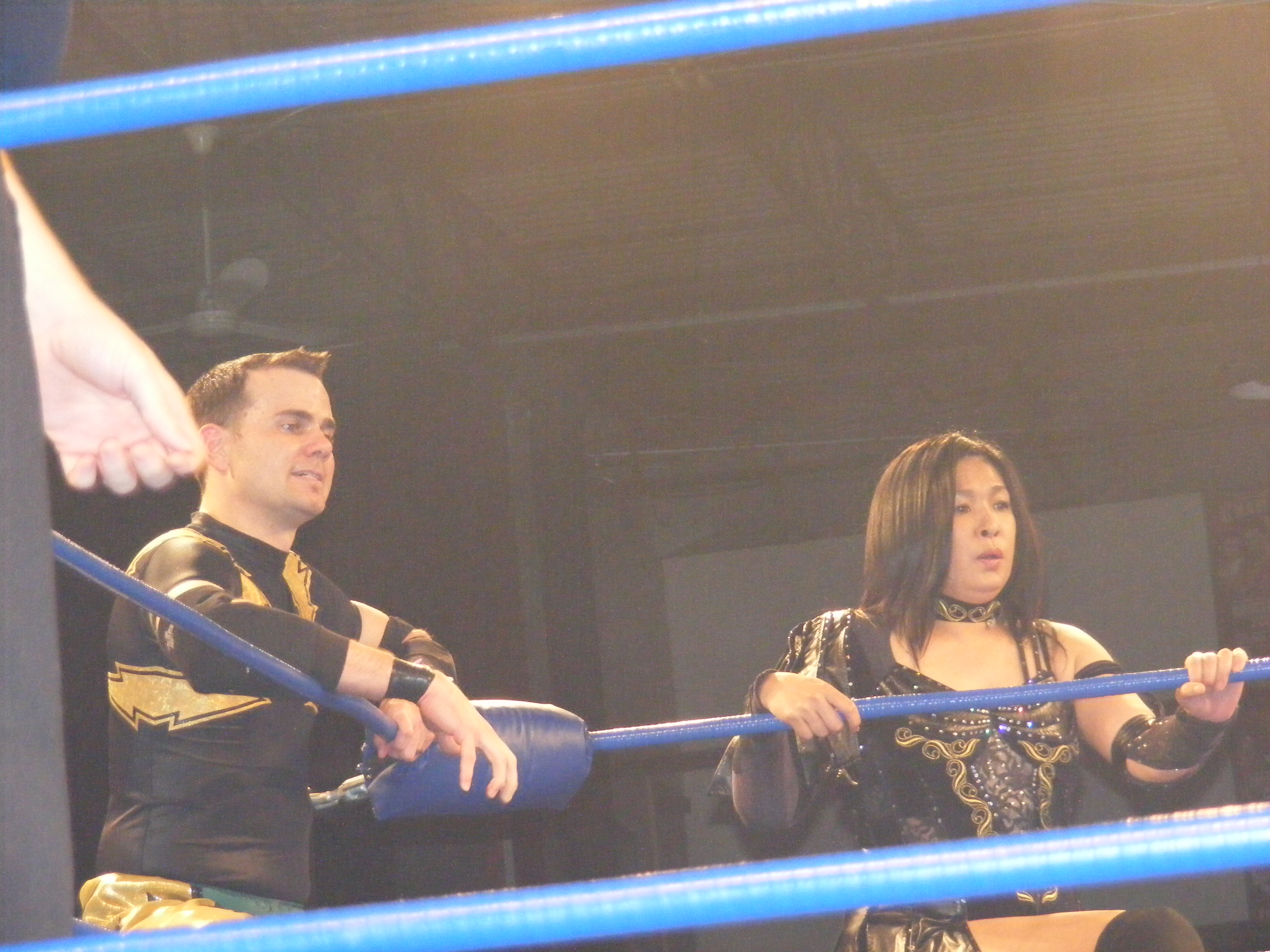
Quackenbush with Manami Toyota in April 2011

Beginning on February 26, 2012, Quackenbush began feuding with the new Gekido stable of 17, assailAnt, combatAnt, deviAnt and The Shard. assailAnt, combatAnt, deviAnt later revealed that they were former dropouts of the Chikara Wrestle Factory, while The Shard was a former training partner of Jigsaw and 17 revealed that he had modeled his career after Quackenbush's and claimed to be just as talented as him, but had never gotten recognized for it. The group announced that its intention was to expose Chikara's "dark underbelly". On June 2 at Chikara's second internet pay-per-view, Chikarasaurus Rex: How to Hatch a Dinosaur, Quackenbush, Eddie Kingston, Jigsaw, Green Ant and Soldier Ant defeated Gekido in a ten-man tag team match, after which Quackenbush grabbed 17's hand and broke his fingers, sidelining him for nine weeks. On August 18, Quackenbush and 17 faced off in a tag team match, where Quackenbush and Jigsaw faced 17 and The Shard. Quackenbush lost the match, being disqualified for "excessive punishment" after hitting 17 with all four versions of his Quackendriver, ending 17's Chikara career in the process. Following the match, Jigsaw confronted Quackenbush about his new mean streak. Quackenbush later explained that he no longer needed to control his temper and play by the rules to maintain an image, since at High Noon Eddie Kingston had taken over his role as the face of Chikara. On September 14, Quackenbush entered the 2012 King of Trios, teaming with Jigsaw and Manami Toyota, just like the previous year. In their first round match, the trio defeated Gekido members combatAnt and deviAnt and Colony member Soldier Ant. After the match, Quackenbush continued his mean streak by attacking combatAnt, eliminating also him from Chikara. The following day, Quackenbush, Jigsaw and Toyota were eliminated from the tournament, after losing to Team Sendai Girls (Dash Chisako, Meiko Satomura and Sendai Sachiko). On November 18, Quackenbush set his sights on eliminating The Shard from Chikara, however, his attempt was stopped by Jigsaw, who superkicked his former Campeones de Parejas partner and then left the arena with The Shard. On December 2 at Chikara's third iPPV, Under the Hood, Quackenbush represented Chikara in an eight-man tag team match, where they were defeated by Gekido, led by Jigsaw. Afterwards, Quackenbush made peace with assailAnt, who turned tecnico and jumped from Gekido to Chikara. On April 6, 2013, Quackenbush teamed with his idol Jushin Thunder Liger to defeat Jigsaw and The Shard in a main event tag team match. Following the event, Quackenbush took a hiatus from in-ring action to heal a tibia fracture suffered during the match and wrist and rib injuries suffered earlier. Quackenbush later claimed that he had no plans to return to the ring.

When Chikara returned from its one-year hiatus on May 25, 2014, with the You Only Live Twice iPPV, Quackenbush was revealed as the promotion's new Director of Fun. In May 2016, Quackenbush announced he was coming out of his retirement to take on Johnny Kidd in what was billed as Kidd's retirement match on May 28. The match, contested in eight three-minute rounds, ended in a 1–1 draw. Quackenbush wrestled another match on December 3, 2016, losing to Drew Gulak in Gulak's Chikara farewell match. Quackenbush's next match took place on April 1, 2017, when he was defeated by Zack Sabre Jr. On September 2, Quackenbush defeated Johnny Kidd in a British Rules match.

On June 24, 2020, Quackenbush announced that Chikara was shutting down and he was resigning as head trainer at the Wrestle Factory following accusations of both inappropriate language and misconduct were made against him and his team as part of the #SpeakingOut movement.

=== National Wrestling Alliance (2007–2010) ===
Quackenbush defeated Tiger Mask at the now defunct Fight Sports Midwest, to capture the NWA World Junior Heavyweight Championship on May 11, 2007. Throughout the match, Quackenbush unlaced and loosened Tiger Mask's mask, a major sign of disrespect amongst masked wrestlers. In the finish of the match Quackenbush completely pulled off his opponent's mask and used the distraction to pin him for the title. In a promo after the match, Quackenbush explained that he did everything to get the NWA World Junior Heavyweight Championship and that he was, in no way, proud of it. He said he viewed the belt as his ticket to Japan, as Japanese promotions had not booked him in any events. He has since defended the title in Chikara against the likes of Black Tiger and Akira Raijin. On November 6, 2010, Quackenbush lost the title to Craig Classic at Pro Wrestling Fusion's November Coming Fire pay-per-view, ending his reign at 1,275 days, the second longest reign in the title's history.

=== Ring of Honor (2007, 2008, 2009) ===
On April 27, 2007, Quackenbush made his debut for Ring of Honor, at The Battle of Saint Paul. Throughout the remainder of the year, he made multiple appearances, several times teaming with Jigsaw. He has competed against the likes of Claudio Castagnoli, Matt Sydal and Bryan Danielson. Although he did compete in one six man tag team match at Ring of Honor's Transform show on January 12, 2008, he did not compete in ROH again till March 2009 when he wrestled, and lost to, Bryan Danielson and Jerry Lynn in singles matches on March 20 and 21, respectively.

=== Independent Wrestling Association Mid-South (2007) ===
In September 2007 Quackenbush won the 2007 Ted Petty Invitational held by Independent Wrestling Association Mid-South by defeating Billy Roc, Joey Ryan and Josh Abercrombie on his way to the finals where he eliminated both Claudio Castagnoli and Chuck Taylor to win the tournament. Quackenbush also captured the IWA Mid-South Heavyweight Championship. Quackenbush made his debut in Japan for Michinoku Pro, defeating Shibaten in the village of Takazawa. He wrestled for the same company, the next night, defeating Rei. In a four-way elimination match against Chris Hero, Eddie Kingston and Chuck Taylor, Quackenbush put his IWA Mid-South Heavyweight Championship and IWA Mid-South Light Heavyweight Championship on the line. Quackenbush was pinned by Chuck Taylor, thus capturing the IWA Mid-South Light Heavyweight Championship. Eddie Kingston then pinned Quackenbush, capturing the IWA Mid-South Heavyweight Championship.

=== Dragon Gate USA (2009–2011) ===
On July 25, 2009, Quackenbush appeared on Dragon Gate USA's first pay-per-view Enter the Dragon in an eight-man tag team Chikara showcase match, where Quackenbush, Jigsaw, Fire Ant and Soldier Ant defeated Gran Akuma, Icarus, Amasis and Hallowicked. Following the match Quackenbush started a promo, which was interrupted by Yamato, who low-blowed him. Jigsaw and Gran Akuma ran to make the save, but Akuma turned on his fellow Chikara wrestlers and assisted Yamato in assaulting Quackenbush and Jigsaw. On September 6 at the second PPV titled Untouchable Quackenbush and Jigsaw defeated Yamato and Akuma. On November 28 at the third PPV Freedom Fight Quackenbush entered the tournament to crown the first Open the Freedom Gate Champion, but was eliminated in the first round in a four-way match with Jorge Rivera, Super Crazy and the winner of the match, Cima. On January 23, 2010, at the fourth PPV, Fearless, Quackenbush and Jigsaw defeated Cima and Super Crazy in a tag team match. At the two following shows, Open the Ultimate Gate and Mercury Rising, on March 26 and 27, Quackenbush and Jigsaw lost to Genki Horiguchi and Susumu Yokosuka and defeated The Young Bucks (Matt and Nick Jackson) in tag team matches. On May 7 at Open the Northern Gate Quackenbush and Jigsaw defeated Kamikaze USA representatives Gran Akuma and Akira Tozawa in a tag team match and were then assaulted by their teammates Yamato and Shingo. At the following day's tapings of the Uprising pay-per-view, Quackenbush and Jigsaw were defeated by the team of Naruki Doi and PAC. After the match Quackenbush challenged Yamato to a tag team match, before he and Jigsaw were once again jumped by the members of Kamikaze USA. On July 24 at the tapings of the Enter the Dragon 2010 pay–per–view, Quackenbush, Jigsaw and Hallowicked teamed up with the Open the Dream Gate Champion Masato Yoshino to defeat Kamikaze USA's Yamato, Gran Akuma, Akira Tozawa and Jon Moxley in an eight-man elimination tag team match. On September 25 at Untouchable 2010, Quackenbush competed in a three-way match, which was won by BxB Hulk and also included Akira Tozawa. The following day at Way of the Ronin, Quackenbush wrestled in a six-way match, which was won by Brodie Lee. On February 21, 2011, Dragon Gate USA announced that Quackenbush had decided to disband the Chikara Sekigun stable and take a leave of absence from the promotion in order to concentrate on defending his newly won Campeonatos de Parejas in Chikara.

=== WWE (2016, 2018) ===
On February 8, 2016, Quackenbush began work for WWE as a guest trainer and coach at their Orlando, Florida-based Performance Center. His role expanded to include production consultation for WWE's developmental brand, NXT.

In November 2018, Quackenbush returned to WWE's Performance Center, training with injured wrestler Alexa Bliss.

=== Other promotions and endeavors ===
Quackenbush has toured Canada, Mexico and several European countries during his career. In 2004, he briefly united six championships from three different countries (USA, Mexico and Germany) into the "I-Crown". During his 2000 hiatus from wrestling, Quackenbush wrote his novel Headquarters, produced a direct–to–video project called Crusaders and hosted an improv comedy show and jousting tournament. He returned to the ring in April 2000, after just two full months off.

On December 11, 2010, Quackenbush wrestled his idol Jushin Thunder Liger at a Jersey All Pro Wrestling event. In the end, Liger defeated Quackenbush to retain his JAPW Light Heavyweight Championship.

On February 2, 2013, at the inaugural National Pro Wrestling Day event, Quackenbush wrestled Colt Cabana on the afternoon show in a losing effort.

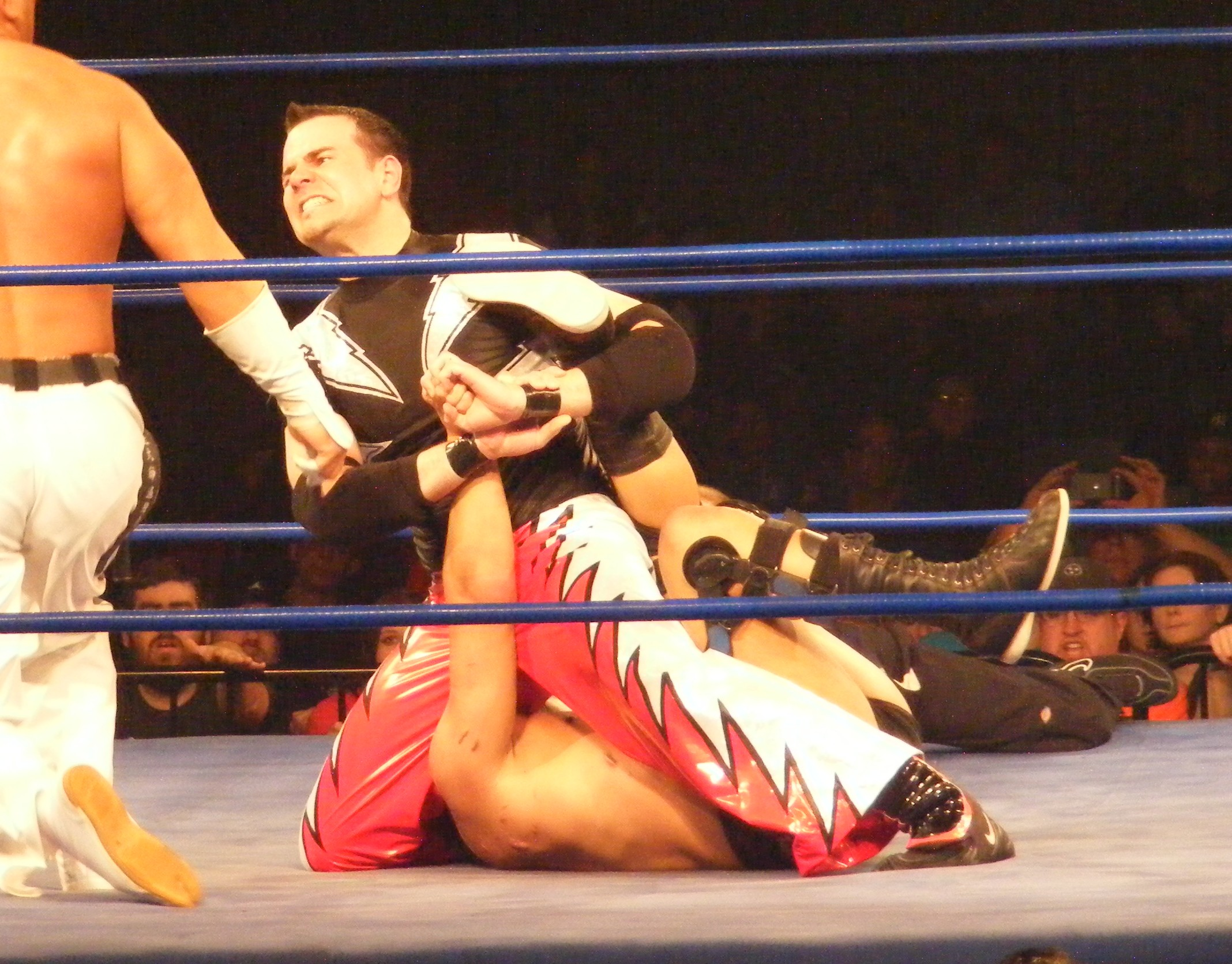
Quackenbush performing the Chikara Special on the Great Sasuke

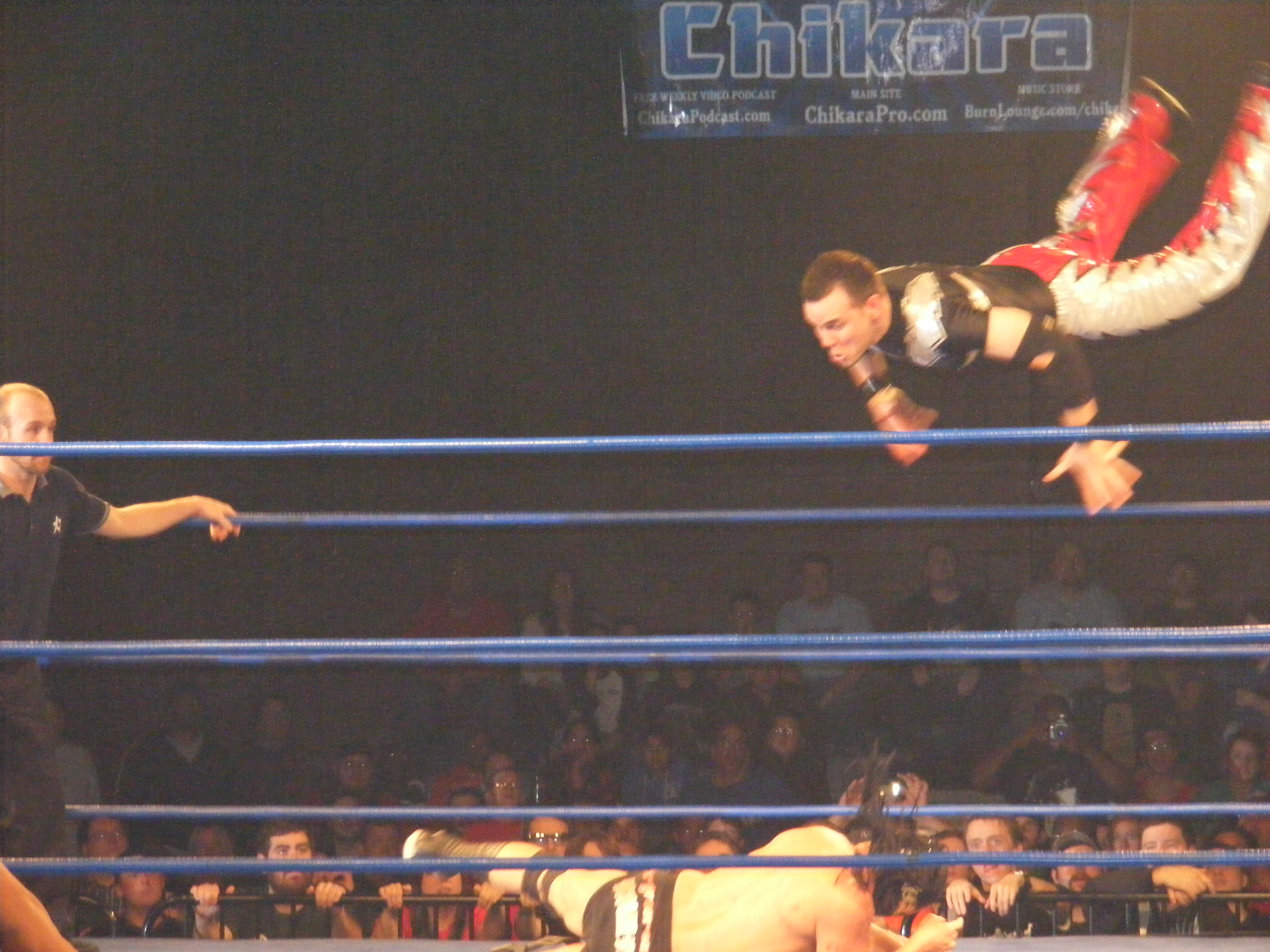
Quackenbush going for a high-angle senton bomb on the Great Sasuke

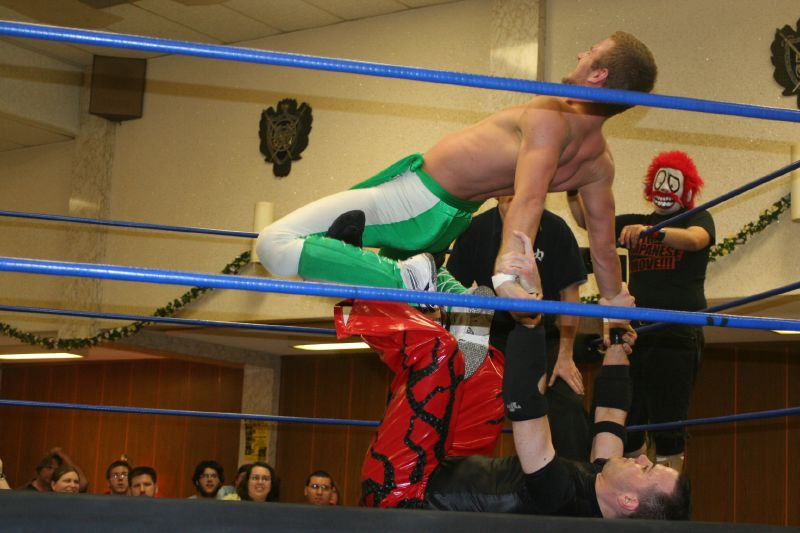
Quackenbush performing a Mexican surfboard on Stupefied in 2008

== Wrestlers trained ==
- Al Deniro
- Aleister Black
- Alexa Bliss
- Amasis
- Andrew Reed
- Andy Sumner
- Angel de Fuego
- Archibald Peck
- Argus
- Arik Cannon
- Athan Promise
- Athrun Amada
- Billy Avery
- Blaster McMassive
- Blaxstrom
- Blind Rage
- Boomer Hatfield
- BLK Jeez
- Branden O'Connor
- Brew Vallon
- Brother Bedlam
- Brown Morning of Belarus
- Bryce Remsburg (referee)
- Bullet Ant
- Cajun Crawdad
- Callux The Castigator
- Caveman Chad
- Chad Gable
- Cheeseburger
- Chris Dickinson
- Christopher McGuckin
- Claudio Castagnoli
- Cliff Pettersson
- Cornelius Crummels
- Crossbones
- Danjerhawk
- Danny Havoc
- Darkness Crabtree
- Dasher Hatfield
- Dave Segan
- Davey Lawless
- Davey Vega
- Devantes
- Doc Diamondfire
- DJ Skittlez
- Dr. Cheung
- Dragon Dragon
- Dragonfly
- Drew Gulak/Soldier Ant
- Eddie Kingston
- Edith Surreal
- Emil Sitoci
- Escorpion Egipcio
- Estonian ThunderFrog
- Exess Jr.
- Fire Ant/Orange Cassidy
- Francis O'Connor
- Frightmare
- G-Raver
- Gran Akuma
- Green Ant (II)
- Hallowicked
- Hermit Crab
- Icarus
- Jack Bonza
- Jack Marciano
- Jakob Hammermeier
- Jardi Frantz
- Jet Jaghori
- Jervis Cottonbelly/Kevin Condron
- Jigsaw
- Joker
- Jon Barber (referee)
- Joshua Wells
- Journey Burke
- Kamen MK
- Kellan Thomas
- Kobald
- Kodama
- Lady Frost
- Lance Steel
- Larry Sweeney
- Leslie Butterscotch
- Lince Dorado
- Lucky 13
- Madison Eagles
- Mark Angelosetti
- Marshal T
- Mason Hunter
- Math Magician
- Matt Demorest
- Matt Makowski
- Matt Novak
- Max Zero
- Medianoche
- Molly McCoy
- Mr. Zero
- Niles Young
- Obariyon
- Ollie
- Ophidian
- Ophidian (II)/The Whisper
- Private Eye
- Professor Nicodemus (manager)
- Proletariat Boar Of Moldova
- Qefka the Quiet
- Razerhawk
- Rorschach
- Rory Gulak
- Saturyne
- Sebastian Dark
- ShareCropper
- Shynron
- Silver Ant/Dieter VonSteigerwalt
- Skeeter McCoy
- Solo Darling
- Stokely Hathaway (manager)
- Stigma
- Sonny Defarge
- Tengkwa
- Terry Daniels
- Thief Ant
- Thumbtack Jack
- Tim Donst
- Tim Kilgore
- Travis Huckabee
- Tunku Amir
- Tursas
- Tyler Murphy
- Übergang
- UltraMantis Black
- Veronica Ticklefeather (valet)
- Victor Benjamin
- Vin Gerard
- Vita VonStarr
- Vries Kastelein
- Wheeler Yuta
- Wesley Croton
- Worker Ant
- Worker Ant (II)
- "Z" Shooting Star Sick
- Zenith

== Championships and accomplishments ==
- Alianza Universal Lucha Libre
  - AULL Intercontinental Lightweight Championship (2 times)
  - AULL Mexican Middleweight Championship (2 times)
- Allied Powers Wrestling Federation
  - APWF Internet Championship (1 time)
- Chikara
  - Campeonatos de Parejas (1 time) – with Jigsaw
  - King of Trios (2007) – with Jigsaw and Shane Storm
- Combat Zone Wrestling
  - CZW World Junior Heavyweight Championship (2 times)
  - Best of the Best V (2005)
- Eastern Wrestling Federation
  - EWF Light Heavyweight Championship (1 time)
- Far North Wrestling
  - FNW Freeweight Championship (1 time)
- Future Wrestling Alliance
  - FWA Championship (3 times)
- International Pro Wrestling
  - IPW Junior Heavyweight Championship (1 time)
  - IPW Hardcore Light Heavyweight Championship (1 time)
- Independent Wrestling Association Deep South
  - IWA Deep South Heavyweight Championship (1 time)
- Independent Wrestling Association Mid-South
  - IWA Mid-South Heavyweight Championship (1 time)
  - IWA Mid-South Light Heavyweight Championship (1 time)
  - Ted Petty Invitational (2007)
- Independent Wrestling Union
  - IWU Light Heavyweight Championship (1 time)
- National Wrestling Alliance
  - NWA World Junior Heavyweight Championship (1 time)
- Northeast Wrestling
  - NEW Junior Heavyweight Championship (1 time)
- Pennsylvania Championship Wrestling
  - PCW Junior Heavyweight Championship (1 time)
  - PCW Six-Man Tag Team Championship (1 time) – with Inferno Kid and Boogie Woogie Brown
  - PCW Tag Team Championship (2 times) – with Pat Shamrock (1) and Inferno Kid (1)
- Pro Wrestling Entertainment
  - PWE Heavyweight Championship (2 times)
  - PWE Tag Team Championship (2 times) – with Hallowicked
- Pro Wrestling Illustrated
  - PWI ranked him #128 of the top 500 singles wrestlers in the PWI 500 in 1999
  - PWI ranked him #441 of the 500 best singles wrestlers during the "PWI Years" in 2003
- Steel City Wrestling
  - SCW Junior Heavyweight Championship (1 time)
  - SCW Lord of the Dance Championship (1 time)
- United States Championship Wrestling
  - USCW Junior Heavyweight Championship (1 time)
- Westside Xtreme Wrestling
  - wXw World Heavyweight Championship (1 time)
  - wXw World Lightweight Championship (1 time)

== Bibliography ==
- Mike Quackenbush (2001) Headquarters
- Mike Quackenbush (2002) Chikara Yearbook: 2002
- Mike Quackenbush (2004) Secret Identity
- Mike Quackenbush (2004) Chikara Yearbook: 2004
- Mike Quackenbush (2009) Chikara Yearbook: 2009 Edition
- Mike Quackenbush (2011) Chikara Yearbook: 2011 – Update
- Mike Quackenbush (2017) 7 Keys to Becoming a Better Performer: A Book for Fellow Pro-Wrestlers
- Mike Quackenbush (2020) Toolbox: Building Better Pro-Wrestling
- Mike Quackenbush (2021) Pro Wrestling History - Six Threads & Sixteen Decades
