= Quackenbush rifle =

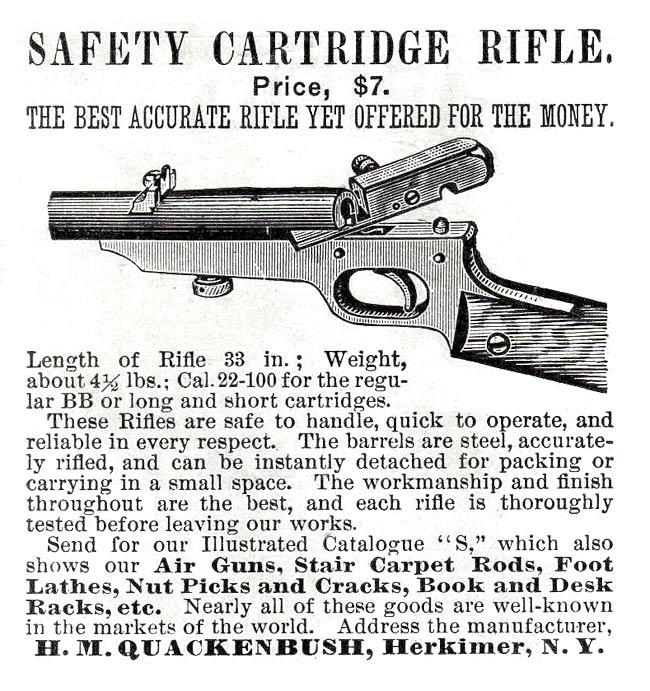
- Type: rifle, air gun
- Place of origin: United States

Production history
- Designer: Henry M. Quackenbush
- Designed: Quackenbush patented his "Safety Rifle" on February 23rd, 1886; #336,586.
- Variants: 11

Specifications

The Quackenbush rifle, invented by industrialist Henry M. Quackenbush, is a clever but cheaply made "Boys' rifle" sold in large numbers in the 1893–1920 period, along with several models of air guns.

== Versions ==
There were eleven models of the air rifle. The overall line was known for being ornamental and accurate. The Quackenbush rifles are fairly desirable collector items and sell for several hundred dollars depending on the exact model and the condition.

The "Junior Safety" rifle came with either a fixed wire stock or one that slid forward for use as a "bicycle rifle" nearly identical with the stock later used on the USAF M4 survival rifle. The "bicycle rifle" had a leather or canvas case by which it was able to be attached in three places on a bicycle. The stock were removed by pulling down on a loop spring.

The "Safety" rifle was able to fire BB's, short, long, and long rifle projectiles. The barrel was made from nickel or gun blued steel.

Quackenbush made gun models were both air gun and firearm; they could shoot .22 caliber, shot, or .21 1/2 projectiles. The last guns were produced in the late 1940s.
