= Henry Quackenbush =

American inventor and industrialist

- Born: Henry Marcus Quackenbush; April 27, 1847; Herkimer, New York
- Died: September 8, 1933 (aged 86)
- Occupations: Industrialist; inventor
- Known for: founding H.M. Quackenbush Co.
- Spouses: Emily E Wood Quackenbush (b.1854 - d.1895); Flora Franks Quackenbush (b.1867 - d.1958)
- Children: Paul Henry (1879 – 1946); Amy (1886 – 1966); Franks (1899 – 1988); Henry Marcus, Jr. (1904 – 1910)

Henry Marcus Quackenbush (April 27, 1847 – September 8, 1933), commonly called "H.M.", was an American inventor and industrialist who founded the H.M. Quackenbush Company in Herkimer, New York. His company was widely known for its air rifles and for the invention of the metal, spring-jointed nutcracker. At the age of 16, he invented the extension ladder, which he patented on October 22, 1867.

== Early apprenticeship and invention of extension ladder ==
Quackenbush was born in Herkimer, New York, in 1847. At age fourteen, he began an apprenticeship at gun manufacturer Remington Arms Co., where he acquired skills as a metalworker and gunmaker. After receiving the patent, Quackenbush began manufacturing ladders himself, until he sold the patent for $500. Several years later, he left his job at Remington to start his own metal working and gun shop in his hometown of Herkimer. It was a good running shop.

== The H.M. Quackenbush Co. ==
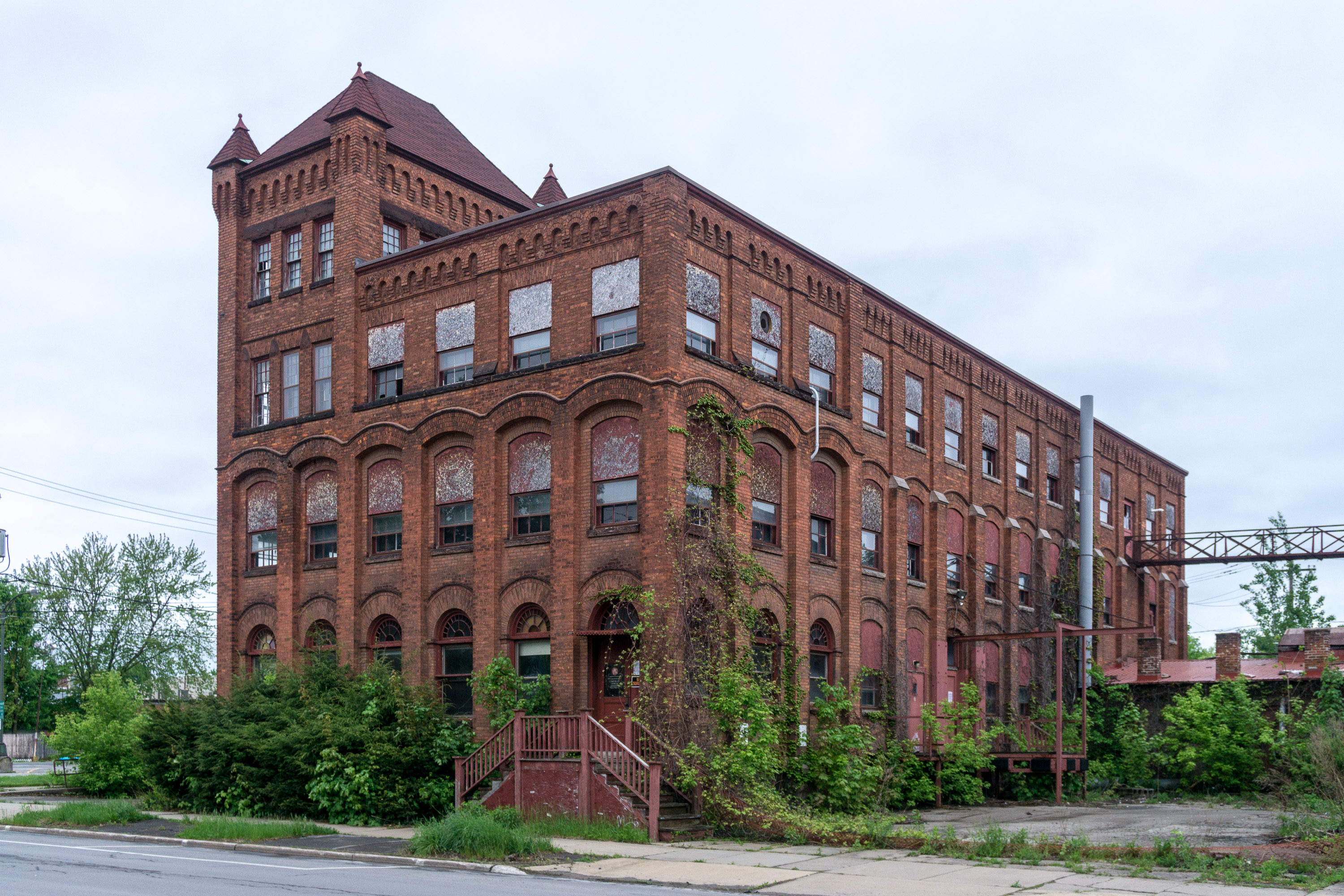
Quackenbush building, 220 Prospect Street, Herkimer

In 1871, he founded the Quackenbush Company in Herkimer, New York, and obtained his first air gun patent (issued June 6, 1871) for his Eureka air pistol. The pistol is now a collector's item.

=== Air rifles ===
The company began producing air rifles in 1876. Their spring/air design, as well as the steam-powered manufacturing plant itself, were considered to be innovative at the time.

In the 1880s, they began mass production of so-called "gallery guns", and the Quackenbush name appeared in carnival and amusement arcade shooting galleries throughout the United States.

The company went on to play a key role in the standardization of shot sizes for shotguns and air-guns, and to produce many models of their very popular Quackenbush air rifles.

=== Nutcrackers ===
In 1913, Quackenbush invented the spring-jointed nutcracker and a nutpick, designs still in wide use today. Over the years, his company produced over 200 million, and metal nutcrackers seen today stamped with the hallmark "HMQ" or "QBC" were those made by the Quackenbush. The company stopped making air guns in the 1930s, but continued making nutpicks and nutcrackers.

=== Other innovations ===
The company also developed and manufactured many other products over the years -- ranging from rifles and sport firearms to kitchen gadgets and seafood tools. Based on U.S. Patent Office records, H.M. Quackenbush and his company were responsible for inventing, or significantly contributing to the development of, numerous early 20th century inventions, including: bicycles; a foot-powered wood lathe; the scroll saw; darts; stair rails; the extension ladder; a bathroom shelf; the nut cracker and picks; the .22 caliber rimfire rifle (3 models, including a bicycle rifle); various air rifles and pistols; ammunition for airguns, including lead air rifle shot (commonly known as "BBs"), felted slugs; the Kaleidoscope; and garment hangers ("coat hangers").

In addition to the items he invented and manufactured, Quackenbush also had to invent the machinery needed to produce the items, which included many innovative manufacturing techniques and methods.

in 1939, the New Jersey Board of Pharmacy tried to prevent the Quackenbush Company from selling vitamins. On October 24, 1940, County Judge Robert Davidson in the common pleas court of Paterson, New Jersey ruled that vitamins were "essentially food products" and not subject to pharmaceutical regulations.

== Death of founder and the company since ==
H.M. Quackenbush died in 1933, at age 86. He is buried in Oak Hill Cemetery in Herkimer, NY.

The following year, his company was incorporated in New York by surviving family members as H. M. Quackenbush, Inc. Operations continued in the following decades under the direction of various Quackenbush family members. During World War II, the company contributed significantly to wartime production, and manufactured a number of military supplies -- including bullet cores, shell casings and other screw machine products used in the war effort.

Since then, most of the company's once prospering, large factories and facilities in Upstate New York's Mohawk Valley have been closed. But in 1979, H. M. Quackenbush Inc. acquired the assets of Utica Plating Co. Marketing, and transferred distribution of nutcrackers and related products to the M. E. Heuck Co. in Cincinnati, Ohio, leaving metal finishing as their primary remaining line of business. The downsized operation was reconstituted as HMQ Metal Finishing Group, LLC, in 1998, with Frederick H. Hager, the great-great grandson of the founder, as chairman and CEO. HMQ Group had three operating units, in addition to their corporate offices in Herkimer. These included the H.M. Quackenbush plant in Herkimer, HMQ Chemtech LLC in Oriskany, NY, and HMQ National Plating LLC in Syracuse, NY.

In 2005, the company ceased operations and closed, and its assets were purchased by another plating industry company, Whyco Finishing Technologies, based in Thomaston, CT.

In July 2021, the Herkimer County Industrial Development Agency (IDA) approved a quit claim resolution turning over the former H.M. Quackenbush property on North Prospect Street in Herkimer, New York, to the Herkimer 9 initiative who have plans to revive the site including it having a museum honoring Quackenbush.

In June 2023 the Quackenbush factory site was added to the New York state and United States national registers of historic places.
