= 1973 in art =

Events from the year 1973 in art.

== Events ==
- August 25 – Jesús Soto Museum of Modern Art in Ciudad Bolívar, Venezuela, designed by Carlos Raúl Villanueva, is opened.
- Alexander Calder is hired by Braniff International Airways to paint a full-size DC-8-62 as a "flying canvas".
- David Hockney begins a 2-year spell living and working in Paris.
- Aristeidis Metallinos begins his career as a sculptor.
- Robert Scull's collection of American Pop and Minimal art is auctioned by Sotheby's in New York City.

== Awards ==
- Archibald Prize: Janet Dawson – Michael Boddy

== Exhibitions ==
- November to December – Henri Matisse at the Acquavella Galleries in New York City.
- Christopher Williams – centenary exhibition in Cardiff, Maesteg and Swansea.

== Works ==
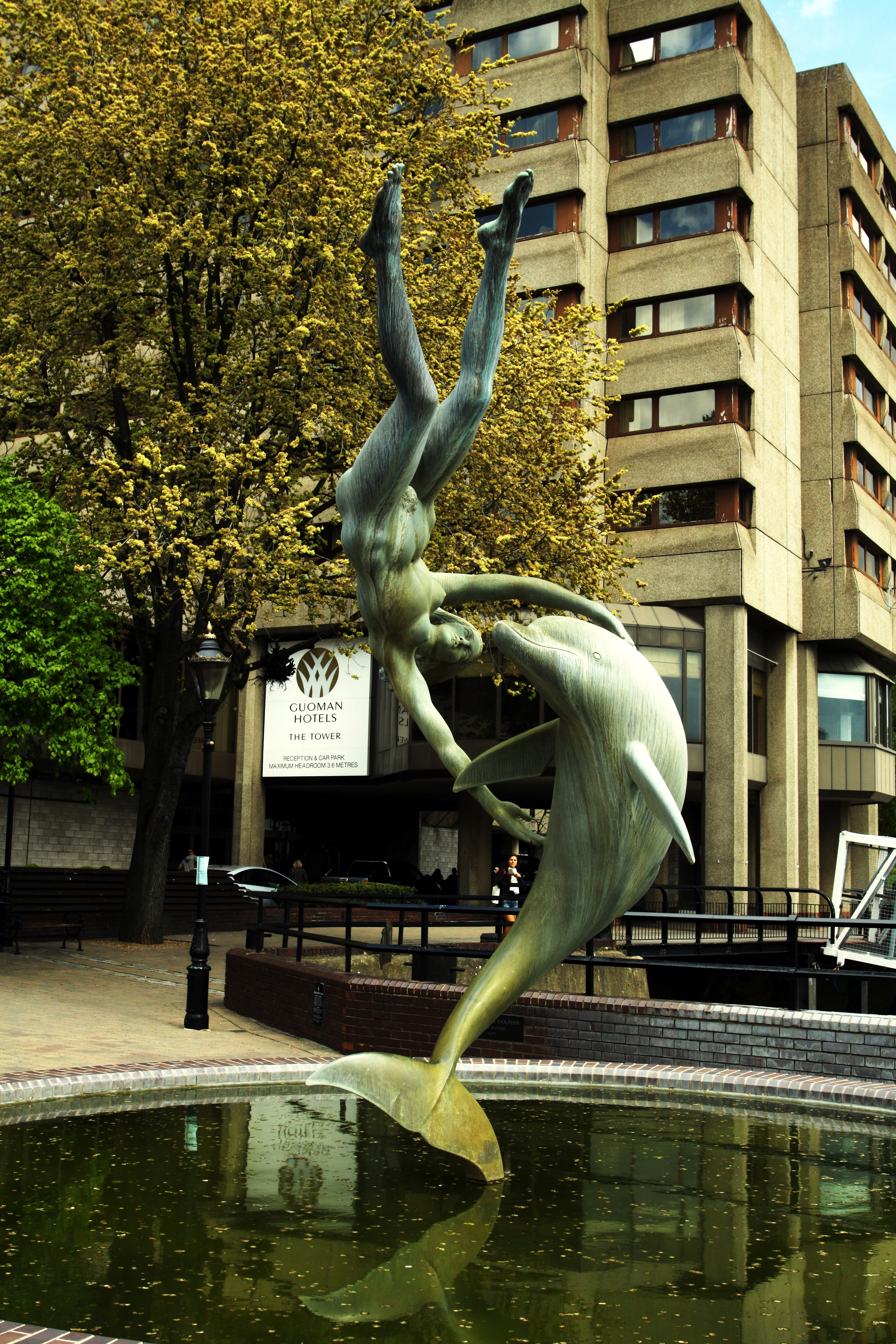
David Wynne – Girl with a Dolphin

- Emma Amos – Sandy and Her Husband
- Michael Ayrton – Icarus (sculpture, London)
- Michael Craig-Martin – An Oak Tree (conceptual work)
- Salvador Dalí – Dalí Seen from the Back Painting Gala from the Back Eternalised by Six Virtual Corneas Provisionally Reflected by Six Real Mirrors (stereoscopic painted in duplicate but for a small variation – completed)
- William Eggleston – The Red Ceiling (photograph)
- Ben Enwonwu – Tutu
- Gluck – Credo (Rage, Rage Against the Dying of the Light) (completed)
- Barbara Hepworth – Conversation with Magic Stones
- Hipgnosis – The Dark Side of the Moon (album cover)
- David Hockney – The Student: Homage to Picasso (print)
- David Inshaw – The Badminton Game
- Nabil Kanso – Place des Martyres (paintings); Vietnam paintings series (through 1974)
- Frederic Littman – Farewell to Orpheus (bronze, Portland, Oregon)
- Joan Miró – completes series The navigator's hope
- Joan Mitchell – Iva (monumental triptych, Tate Modern
- Henry Moore – Large Four Piece Reclining Figure 1972–73 (bronze)
- Mike Parr – Wound By Measurement (performed at Galerie Impact in Lausanne, Switzerland)
- Ivor Roberts-Jones – Statue of Winston Churchill, Parliament Square (bronze, London)
- Dorothea Tanning – Hôtel du Pavot, Chambre 202 (work completed)
- Euan Uglow – Georgia
- Andy Warhol – Man
- David Wynne
  - Embracing Lovers (bronze, Guildhall, London)
  - Girl with a Dolphin (bronze, by Tower Bridge, London)

== Births ==
- January 29 – Louise Hindsgavl, Danish artist
- February 1 – Yuri Landman, Dutch musician, comic book creator and singer
- May 8 – Hiromu Arakawa, Japanese manga artist
- July 7 – Natsuki Takaya, Japanese manga artist
- July 28 (possible date) – Banksy, English graffiti artist
- August 18 – Jerome Lagarrigue, French painter and illustrator
- date unknown
  - Noma Bar, Israeli-born illustrator and graphic artist.
  - Jean-Pierre Canlis, American glass artist.
  - Oisín McGann, Irish author and illustrator.
  - Rosalind Nashashibi, Palestinian-English film artist.
  - Charles Pétillon, French photographer and installation artist

== Deaths ==
=== January to June ===
- January 17 – Tarsila do Amaral, Brazilian modernist artist (b. 1886).
- March 14 – Chic Young, American cartoonist (b. 1901).
- March 25
  - Gerda Höglund, Swedish religious painter (b. 1878).
  - Edward Steichen, American photographer, painter and curator (b. 1879).
- April 8 – Pablo Picasso, Spanish painter, draftsman and sculptor (b. 1881).
- April 13 – Henry Darger, American outsider artist (b. 1892)
- April 28 – Siri Derkert, Swedish artist, sculptor and political campaigner (b. 1888).
- May 1 – Asger Jorn, Danish artist and essayist (b. 1914).
- May 12 – Edith Tudor Hart, née Suschitzky, Austrian-born photojournalist and communist agent in Britain (b. 1908).
- May 16 – Albert Paris Gütersloh, Austrian painter and writer (b. 1887).
- May 18 – Ronald Ossory Dunlop, Irish author and painter (b. 1894).
- May 21 – Montague Dawson, English maritime painter (b. 1890).

=== July to December ===
- July 20 – Robert Smithson, American artist (b. 1938).
- August 9 – Claude Buckle, English poster artist and watercolourist (b. 1905).
- September 30 – Peter Pitseolak, Inuit photographer, artist and historian (b. 1902).
- November 13 – Elsa Schiaparelli, Italian fashion designer (b. 1890).
- November 17 – Adolf Wissel, German painter, an official artist of Nazism (b. 1894).
- December 7 – Camilo Mori, Chilean painter (b. 1896).
- December 13 – Ralph Stackpole, American sculptor, painter, muralist, etcher and art educator (b. 1885).
- December 16 – Andrej Bicenko, Russian fresco painter and muralist (b. 1886).

== See also ==
- 1973 in Fine Arts of the Soviet Union
