= Sandy and Her Husband =

1973 painting by Emma Amos

Sandy and Her Husband is a 1973 painting by the postmodern African-American painter and printmaker Emma Amos (1937-2020). In 2018 the painting was acquired directly from the artist's collection by the Cleveland Museum of Art after having been shown as the centerpiece of the exhibition "We Wanted a Revolution: Black Radical Women, 1965–85" at the Brooklyn Museum. The painting actually contains a painting of another Amos painting "Flower Sniffer" (1966), which is a self portrait, and thus the artist was also able to insert herself into the later painting. In addition "Flower Sniffer" was exhibited at the Brooklym Museum to corresponding visual and historical effect. It is considered one of if not the most important work by Amos.

Writing on Artnet in an article on some of the romantic embraces depicted in art Caroline Goldstein says of the work...."Gorgeous and stylish, Sandy and Her Husband is a painting of aching everyday intimacy. The couple sways together in their stylishly appointed apartment, fingers woven together, eyes closed, lost in a song we can’t hear and sharing a moment. Their apartment is decked out in full ’70s style, in the artist’s lush palette.

The painting is being exhibited as part of a traveling retrospective of the artist's work "Emma Amos: Color Oddessry" originating at the Georgia Museum of Art in Athens, Georgia (January 30, 2021 - April 25, 2021). The show will then move on to the Munson-Williams-Proctor Arts Institute (June 19 to September 12, 2021), and the Philadelphia Museum of Art (October 9, 2021, to January 2, 2022.
