= Louise M. Davies Symphony Hall =

Concert hall in San Francisco

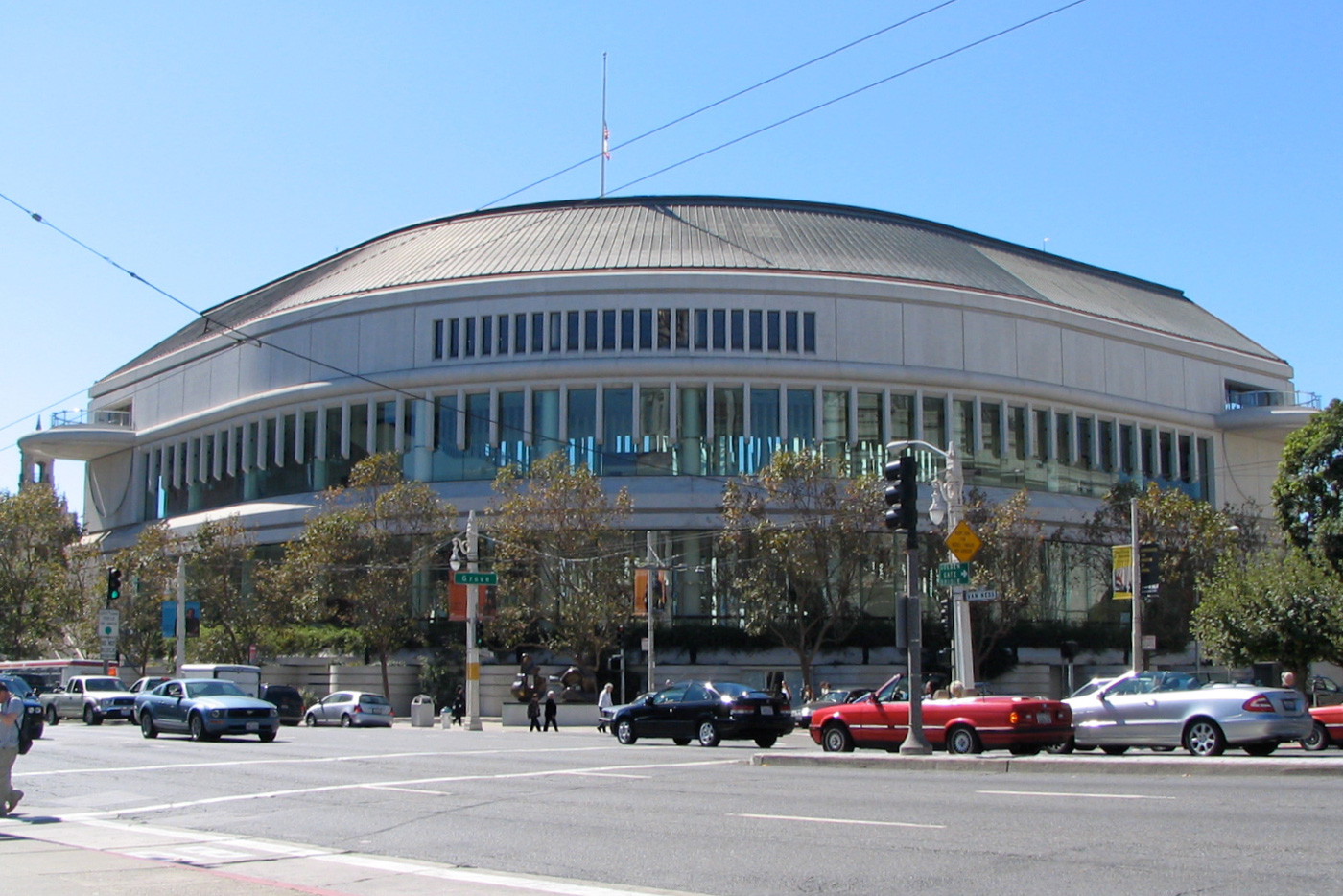

- Location in Central San Francisco
- Interactive fullscreen map
- Address: 201 Van Ness Avenue; San Francisco, California; United States
- Coordinates: 37.777970°N 122.420646°W
- Owner: San Francisco War Memorial and Performing Arts Center
- Capacity: 2,743
- Type: concert hall
- Public transit: Van Ness; Civic Center

Construction
- Opened: 1980; 46 years ago
- Architects: Skidmore, Owings & Merrill and Pietro Belluschi

Website
- sfwarmemorial.org

Louise M. Davies Symphony Hall is the concert hall component of the San Francisco War Memorial and Performing Arts Center in San Francisco, California. The 2,743-seat hall was completed in 1980 at a cost of US$28 million to give the San Francisco Symphony a permanent home.

Previously, the symphony shared the neighboring War Memorial Opera House with the San Francisco Opera and San Francisco Ballet. The construction of Davies Hall allowed the symphony to expand to a full-time, year-round schedule.

== Acoustics ==
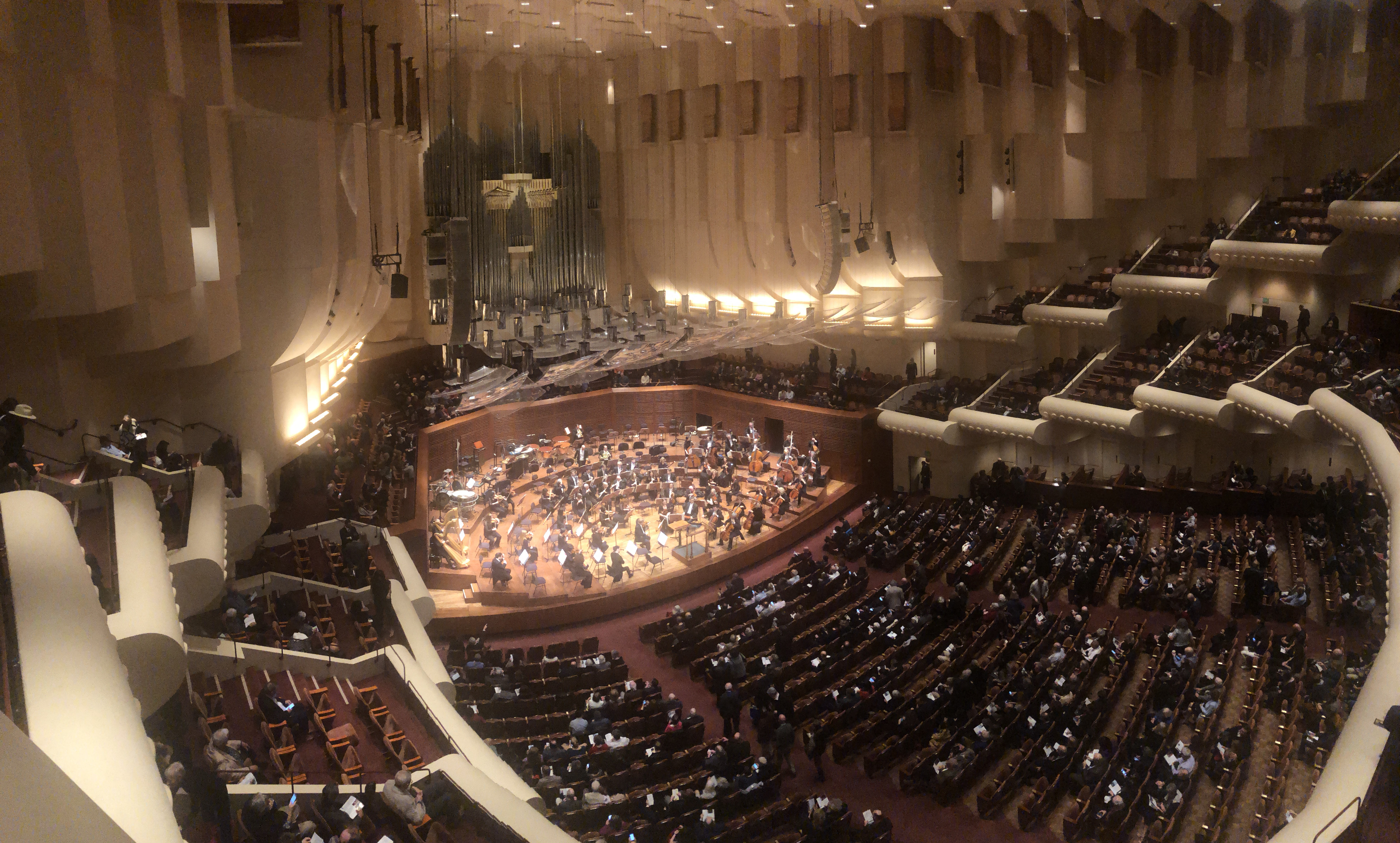
The San Francisco Symphony at the Symphony Hall

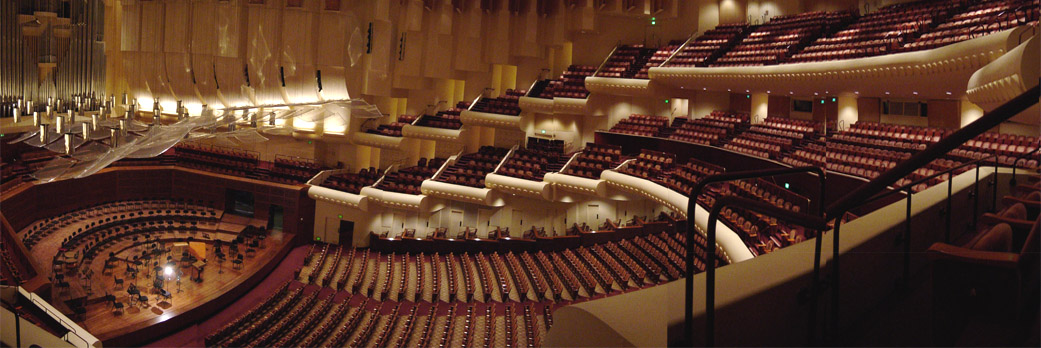
Auditorium

Designed by Skidmore, Owings & Merrill and Pietro Belluschi along with acoustical consultants Bolt, Beranek and Newman, its design is elegant both inside and out. A "cloud" of movable convex acrylic reflecting panels over the stage enables the acoustic space to be adjusted to suit the size of the orchestra and audience, while adjustable fabric banners around the auditorium can alter the reverberation time from approximately one to two-and-one-half seconds.

Architects created acoustic isolation of the performance space by constructing a building within a building. The outer building uses one inch thick structural glass as a curtain wall, with the next structural wall forming the back wall of the lobby spaces. Passing through a door leads to a hallway, bounded on one side by the lobby wall and on the other by the structural wall of the inner building. This continuous hallway acts as an acoustical isolator and is surfaced with sound absorbing material.

However, the hall's large volume and seating capacity initially resulted in less than ideal results. Kirkegaard Associates completed acoustical renovations in 1992 at a cost of $10 million which resulted in substantial improvement.

The modifications included: narrowing and shaping the walls above the stage to reduce the volume of space and increase useful reflections, replacing the cloud of reflector discs with a more effective array of curved rectangular panels covering a larger area and now computer adjustable, moving the walls of the floor-level seating inward to make the audience area narrower and more rectangular, adding aisles to replace the former continental seating, adding diffusing elements in various parts of the hall, and increasing the "rake" of the floor seating to provide better sightlines. In addition, the firm installed risers on the stage allowing musicians to both see and hear each other better. These and other improvements enhanced not only the acoustics but also the hall's beauty.

== Fratelli Ruffatti concert organ ==
The Fratelli Ruffatti electro-pneumatic pipe organ with 147 ranks was added in 1984. It is designed to accommodate repertory from the pre-baroque to modern times. The console can be electronically reprogrammed for both major schools of organ keyboard organization, the German and the French. The console is mobile and can be placed where appropriate to the program or stored off-stage when not in use.

== Amenities ==
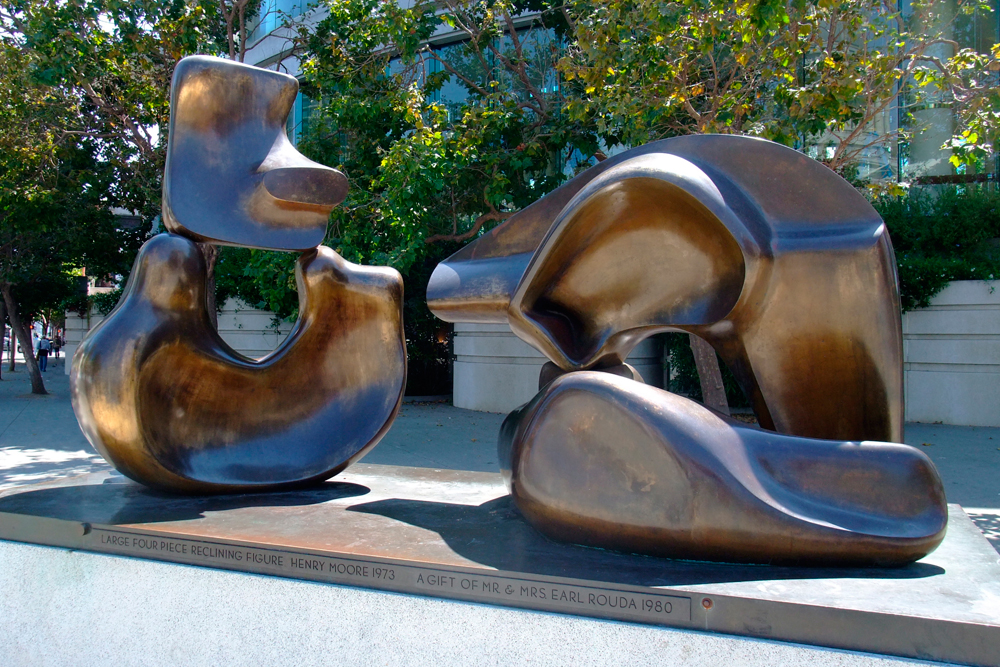
Large Four Piece Reclining Figure 1972–73 by Henry Moore, 1973. Bronze, approximately 13 feet.

In addition to the concert hall itself, an adjoining building contains the Harold L. Zellerbach Rehearsal Hall, comprising three separate rehearsal spaces. The largest of these was designed to be the same size as the stage of the Opera House across the street to accommodate Opera and Ballet rehearsals. Davies Hall also contains offices for symphony staff, a music library, dressing rooms, a recreation room and lockers for symphony musicians, and the Wattis Room, a private dining room for major donors. A proposed recital hall was never built; that portion of the site remains empty, and is used for employee parking.

A Henry Moore bronze sculpture, Large Four Piece Reclining Figure 1972–73 (1973), is displayed outside the hall at the corner of Grove Street and Van Ness Avenue.

Davies Hall also occasionally hosts non-orchestral performances by contemporary musicians.

== Reviews ==
In 1980, Paul Goldberger of The New York Times called the hall "a building utterly confused about style, a poor hybrid that has neither the verve of one aspect of the city's identity nor the powerful tradition of another."

== See also ==
- List of concert halls
