= Large Four Piece Reclining Figure 1972–73 =

Sculpture series by Henry Moore

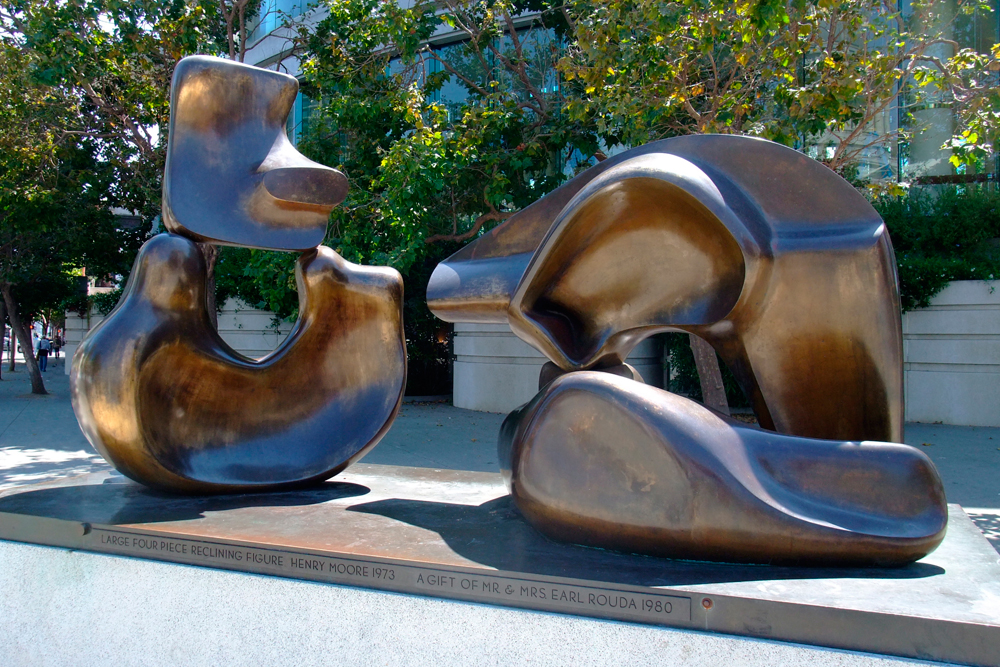
- outside the Davies Symphony Hall in San Francisco
- Artist: Henry Moore
- Catalogue: LH 629
- Medium: Bronze
- Subject: A reclining human figure
- Dimensions: 4 m (13 ft)

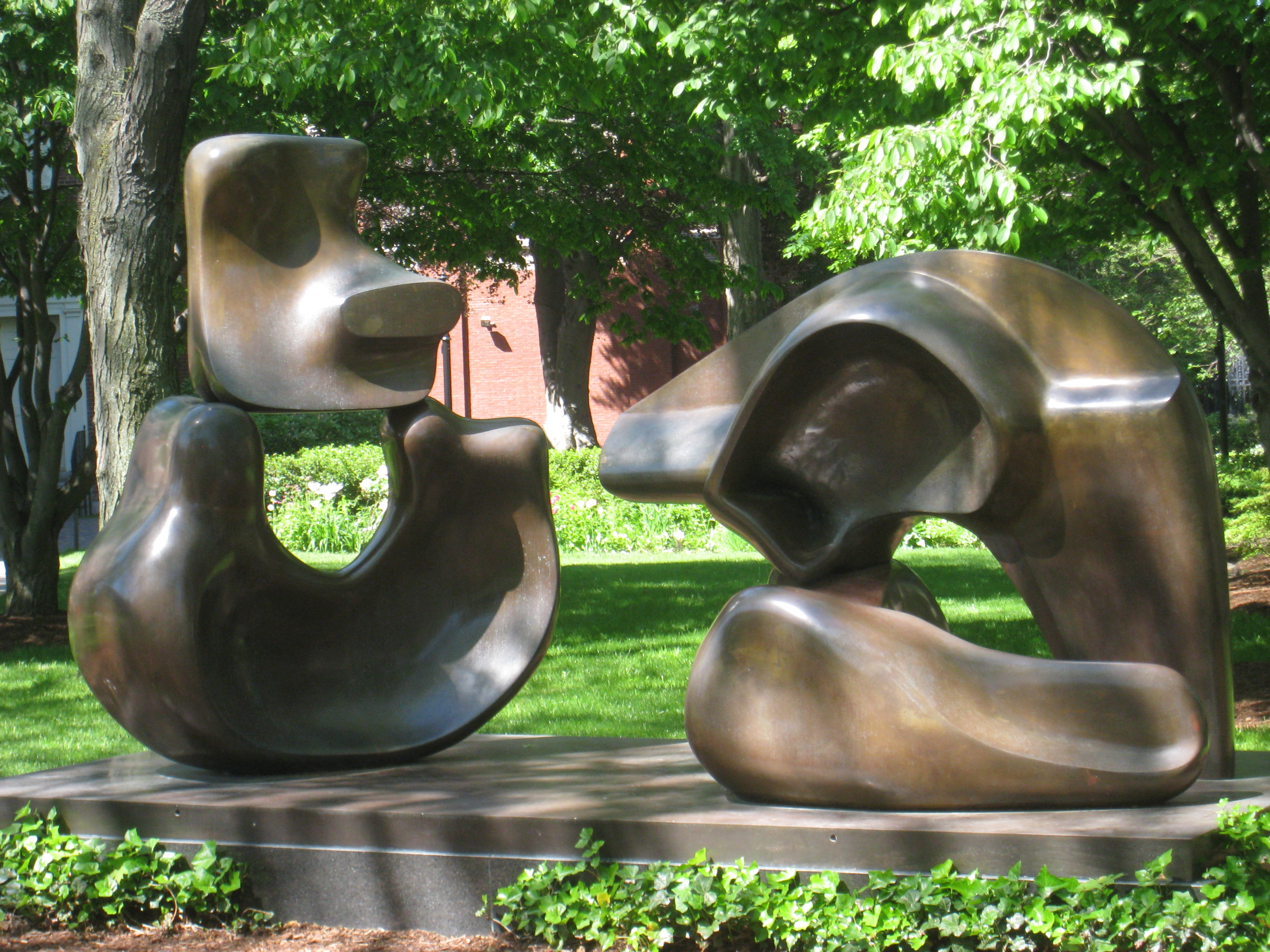
Large Four Piece Reclining Figure 1972–73 at Harvard University.

Large Four Piece Reclining Figure 1972–73 (LH 629) is a bronze sculpture by Henry Moore. Approximately 4 metres (13 ft) long, the sculpture was made an edition of seven full size casts (plus an artist's copy), all cast by the Hermann Noack foundry in Berlin.

== Description ==
Relatively unusually for Moore's work, the cast is polished rather than patinated. The highly abstract – almost surreal – sculpture comprises four pieces, with the composition reminiscent of a reclining human figure.

== Casts ==
One cast is located outside the Louise M. Davies Symphony Hall at the intersection of Van Ness and Grove Streets in San Francisco's Civic Center, in the U.S. state of California. The work's estimated cost is between $60,000 and $85,000. The work was displayed in London's Gagosian Gallery in 2012.

Other casts are located at the Lamont Library, Harvard University, in Cambridge, Massachusetts, and at Yamanashi Prefectural Museum of Art in Kofu, Japan. The artist's copy (cast 0) is at the Henry Moore Foundation in Perry Green, Hertfordshire.

== See also ==
- 1973 in art
- List of sculptures by Henry Moore
