= Fountain Elms =

Historic house in New York, United States

- U.S. National Register of Historic Places
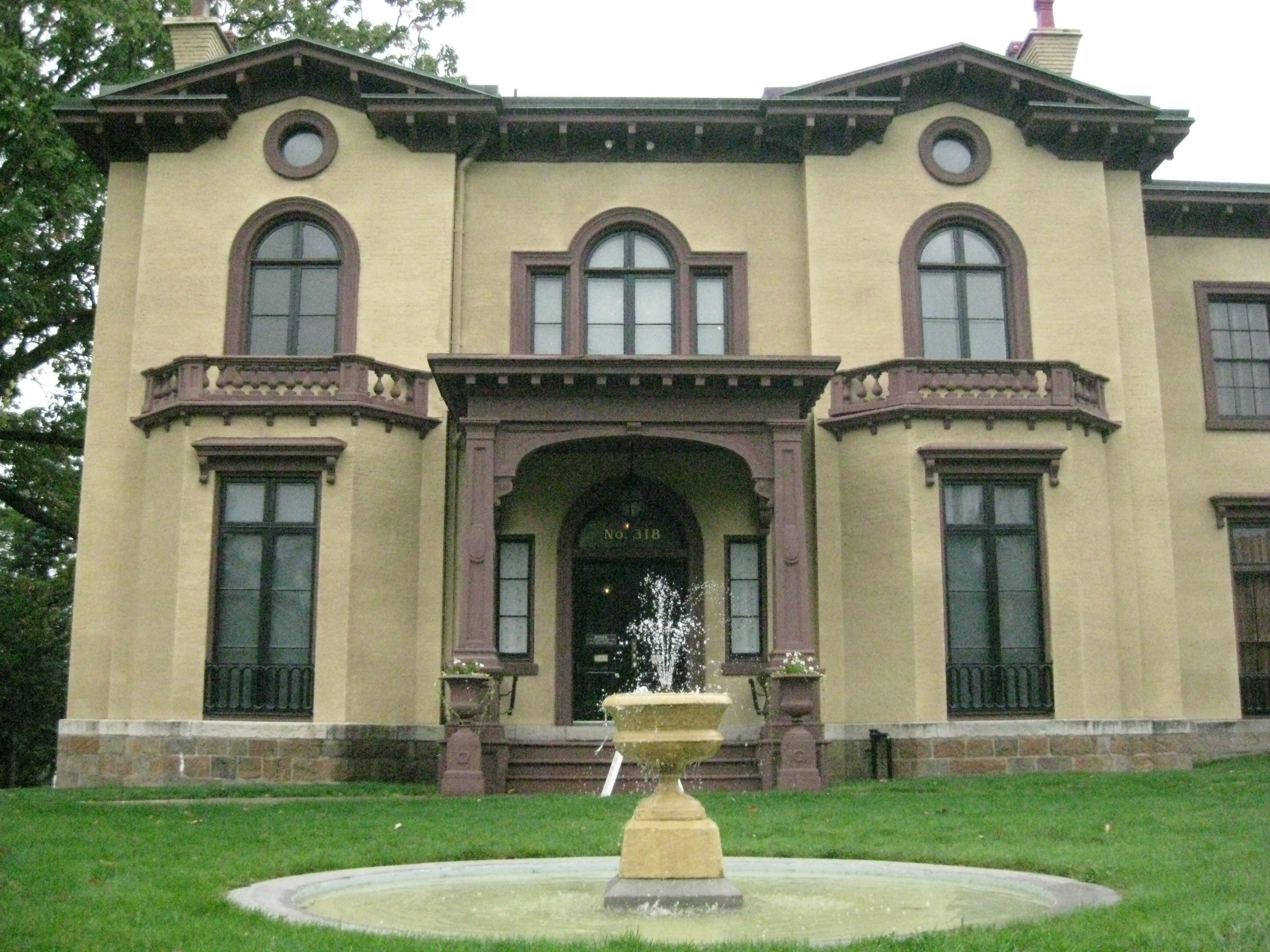

- Location within New York Location within the United States
- Location: 318 Genesee St., Utica, New York
- Coordinates: 43°5′49″N 75°14′29″W
- Area: less than one acre
- Built: 1852
- Architect: Woolett, William, Jr.; Thomas, Phillip
- Architectural style: Italian style
- NRHP reference No.: 72001599
- Added to NRHP: November 3, 1972

Fountain Elms is a historic home located at Utica in Oneida County, New York. It is part of the Munson-Williams-Proctor Arts Institute. The original block was completed in 1852 in the "Italian Style". It is basically a cube with a center hall plan. The original rear wing was remodeled in 1883 and a third two-story wing added. An additional wing and piazza were added in 1908, resulting in the current irregular plan.

It was listed on the National Register of Historic Places in 1972.

== Background ==
Fountain Elms, located on Genesee Street in Utica, NY, was built in 1850 by Helen Elizabeth Munson Williams (1824-1894) and James Watson Williams (1810-1873) in collaboration with architect William Woollett of Albany, NY. Fountain Elms was also the home where Helen and James Williams raised their three daughters Grace (1847-1854), Rachel (1850-1915), and Maria (1853-1935)

== Family ==
In 1823 Alfred Munson (1793-1854) moved to Utica, NY. He obtained his fortune in the Northeastern United States through investments in industrial businesses which included coal mining, manufacturing, canal development, and railroad and steamboat transportation.

Helen Elizabeth Munson Williams, Alfred's daughter, was a Utica, NY native who in 1846 married local lawyer James Watson Williams. James became heavily involved in his father-in-law's business negotiations, and even became a lobbyist in the New York State Legislature on Alfred's behalf. Helen was well regarded for her philanthropic efforts in the Central New York region, as well as for her abundant 19th century fine art collections. She was known as a savvy investor who, through strategic decisions, increased her inheritance ten-fold. Using her acquired money, she went on to purchase more pieces of fine art and decorations adding to what would become the center of the family's art compilation. Helen was also civic-minded and provided money to help fund such projects as the renovation of the Grace Episcopal Church. After the death of Helen Munson Williams in 1894, her two surviving daughters Rachel and Maria continued with her philanthropic efforts in the Oneida county region of New York State.

On April 9, 1891, at the age of 38, Maria Watson Williams married the prominent Thomas R. Proctor (1844-1920). Rachel Munson Williams at the age of 44 married Frederick Proctor (1856-1929) in 1894. After Rachel and Frederick's marriage, they moved into Fountain Elms; during this time the pair continued to add to the building's internal design by collecting multiple works of art and decorative furnishings. In returning from England in 1912, Rachel expanded the Episcopal Sisterhood and the Sisters of Saint Margaret. Rachel and husband Frederick Proctor built and provided furnishings for St. Luke's home and hospital. Rachel and Maria are both credited with providing many contributions to Grace Church in Utica. Rachel and Maria did not provide heirs to the Munson Williams Proctor fortune.

== Fountain Elms ==
After the death of James Watson Williams in 1876, Helen and her children began the task of modifying the Fountain Elms home. In 1936 shortly after the death of Maria the Munson Williams Proctor Arts Institute was opened by Frederick Proctor as the "Fountain Elms Building." It served as the museum's galleries for years until 1960 after the completion of a brand new gallery space designed by Philip Johnson. It was then decided that the Fountain Elms building would be restored to its original 1850s Victorian era style. The project received a large amount of national attention as it was one of the earliest of its kind in the United States. In August 2013 the building had sustained a large amount of water damage. In order to repair the damage, the Preservation League of New York State awarded $3,000 to the project.

== Current uses ==
The museum has a wide array of permanent collections including European Modernism, Modern and Contemporary Art, 19th Century American Paintings and Sculptures, and Thomas Cole's “The Voyage of Life” ( “Fountain Elms Building.” ). General admission is free, but special exhibits may require a fee. The museum also houses workshops and art classes ( “Fountain Elms Building.” ). The Museum has events annually, including the Sidewalk Art show, Antique and Classic Car show, and the Invitational Craft show, which are free to the public( “Fountain Elms Building.” ) .
