= Iva (painting) =

1973 painting by Joan Mitchell

Iva is a 1973 oil on canvas painting by Joan Mitchell. It was the first in a cycle of paintings she created at her newly acquired house in Vétheuil in northern France, and was named for her German Shepherd dog. It was acquired by the city of Jacksonville in Florida in 1978 and sold at auction in 2018. Darlene and Jorge M. Pérez donated it to the Tate in London in 2025.

== Description ==
The painting is a monumental oil on canvas triptych. It measures 110 1/4 x 236 inches (280.035 x 599.44 cm). The lot essay for the 2018 Christie's auction of the painting describes Iva as a " ... lush, operatic painting of monumental proportions ... a painterly tour-de-force, capturing the fleeting effects of nature in all its temperamental glory. Brooding passages of atmospheric reds, maroons, mauves and warm earth tones are loosely stacked amongst veils of more ethereal pigments. Bright bursts of canvas punctuate these mottled colors, giving the impression of sunlight breaking through storm-riddled clouds. Floating fields of soft lavender and delicate cornflower blue commingle alongside sparkling areas of bright white. Fine rivulets of thinned-down pigment trickle down the canvas, like falling rain on weathered stone". It is named for Mitchell's German Shepherd dog, that was given to Mitchell by the art dealer Marguerite Maeght, co-founder of the Maeght Foundation. Mitchell said of her dog that she was " ... a total extension of me, or I am of her. I don't know which way you want to put it". The painting evokes the house in Vétheuil, near the river Seine, in the Arrondissement of Pontoise in northern France, that Mitchell had recently acquired. It is the first of a cycle of paintings that she created at the house. Mitchell had previously worked out of a small studio in Paris on the rue Frémicourt, but her new house in Vétheuil with its expansive walls and rural views inspired her and allowed her to work on large canvases. Mitchell would often be kept company by her dog Iva as she worked late at night, listening to Charlie Parker, Italian operas or the music of Johann Sebastian Bach on her Hi-Fi.

== History ==
Iva was exhibited at Mitchell's exhibition at the Whitney Museum of American Art from March-May 1974. It was sold by the Xavier Fourcade gallery to the Prudential Insurance Company of America in 1978 and subsequently acquired by the city of Jacksonville in Florida. The city donated it as a gift to Museum of Contemporary Art Jacksonville in 2006. It was sold at the Post-War and Contemporary Art auction at Christie's in New York on 18 May 2018 for $3,252,500. It was donated to the Tate in 2025 by Darlene and Jorge M. Pérez.

The painting had hung in the Pérez's bedroom. Maria Balshaw, the director of the Tate, described the donation as the most significant to the institution since the Seagram murals by Mark Rothko in 1969. Balshaw had convinced the couple to donate the painting to the Tate over a two-year period. Balshaw said that she felt the Tate had "missed the boat" in terms of acquiring Mitchell's works when they were more affordable. Mitchell's work had been underappreciated, like many female artists. Prior to the donation of Iva the Tate had owned a much smaller late work and some prints by Mitchell.

The Pérezs also endowed a curatorial post at Tate for African art. The couple also plan to make donations to the Tate of African and Latin American artists from their collection. It is intended that Iva will be displayed next to the Seagram murals in the Tate Modern.
