= Charles Pétillon =

French photographer and installation and mixed media artist

Charles Pétillon (born 1973) is a French photographer and installation and mixed media artist who often employs balloons in his art making. Among his works are ones he labels "invasions" where he deploys large amounts of often white ballons into pre-existent built and natural environments. In one notable work the artist installed 100,000 ballons in Covent Garden. Another high-profile work by Pétillon installed in terminal 2E at Charles de Gaulle Airport in Paris features a giant sleeping feline under constellations of light fixtures resembling the balloons favored by the artist, which illuminate as the day darkens into night. The work is titled "Le Phare" (En: Lighthouse).

Pétillon exhibits at Gallerie Danysz in Paris.
