= Jean-Pierre Canlis =

American sculptor

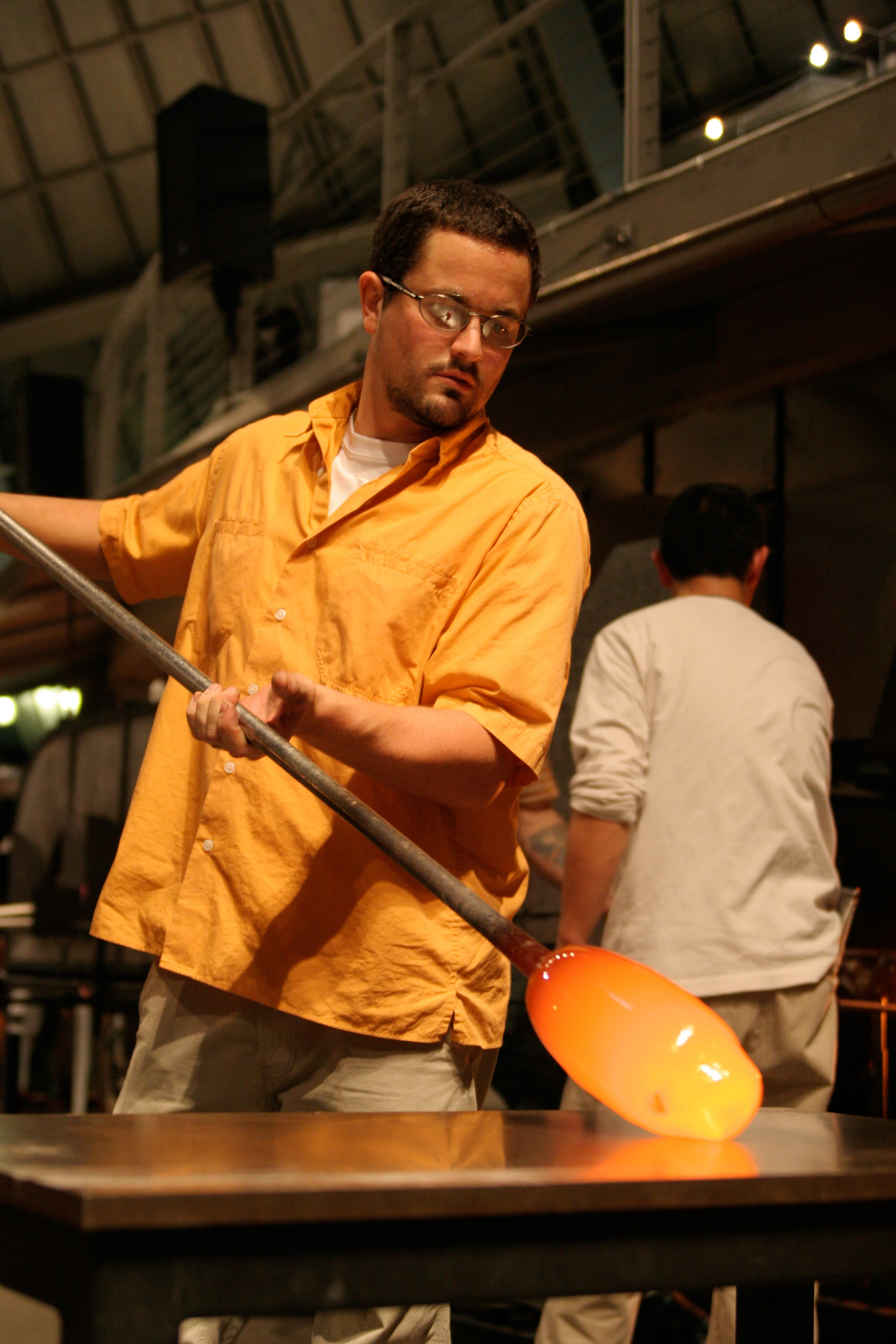
Jean-Pierre Canlis sculpting a section of his piece "Insignificance."

Jean-Pierre Canlis (born 1973) is an American glass artist.

Jean-Pierre Canlis first picked up a glassblowing pipe in 1991 at the Punahou School in Honolulu, Hawai'i. He later studied glass art at Alfred University's School of Art and Design in New York, and the Pilchuck Glass School in Stanwood, Washington. During the summer of 1993, instructor Martin Blank introduced Canlis to Seattle glass artist, Dale Chihuly. After their introduction, Chihuly hired Canlis as a hot shop employee.

Jean-Pierre worked with Chihuly for the next nine years. During his last fours years with Chihuly, Canlis also worked with Lino Tagliapietra's glass team. Five years after beginning with Chihuly's hot shop team, in 1996, Canlis created the company Jean-Pierre Canlis Glass now known as Canlis Glass.

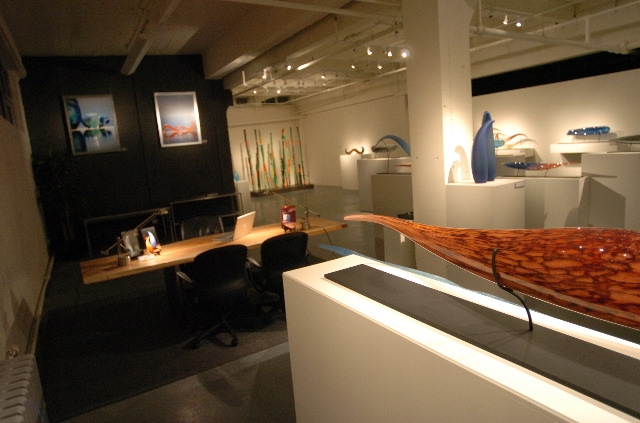
Canlis Glass Gallery of Seattle exclusively showcases Jean-Pierre Canlis's work.

Canlis's works are on view in the Canlis Glass Studio of Seattle, Washington. Canlis Glass is now a strong name in the glass art world. After spending four years working exclusively on Canlis Glass in Honolulu, Jean-Pierre moved back to Seattle in June 2005 to set up Canlis Glass Gallery & Studio. Taking an alternative route in the art world, the gallery focused solely on Jean-Pierre's work so he can have a direct relationship with the client, designer, gallery or art consultant. His large-scale glass art installations as well as individual works can be seen in restaurants, hotels, private collections and corporations from Seattle to Dubai.

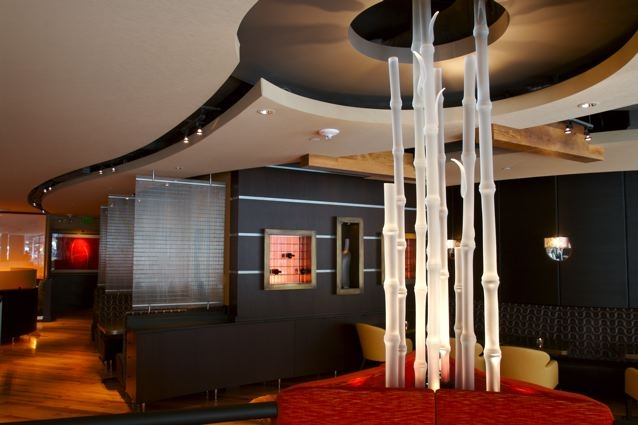
A view of Canlis's work for BOKA restaurant+bar in Seattle, WA.

He currently lives with his daughters in Seattle, Washington.
