= Munson-Williams-Proctor Arts Institute =

Arts center in Utica, New York

- Munson
- U.S. National Register of Historic Places
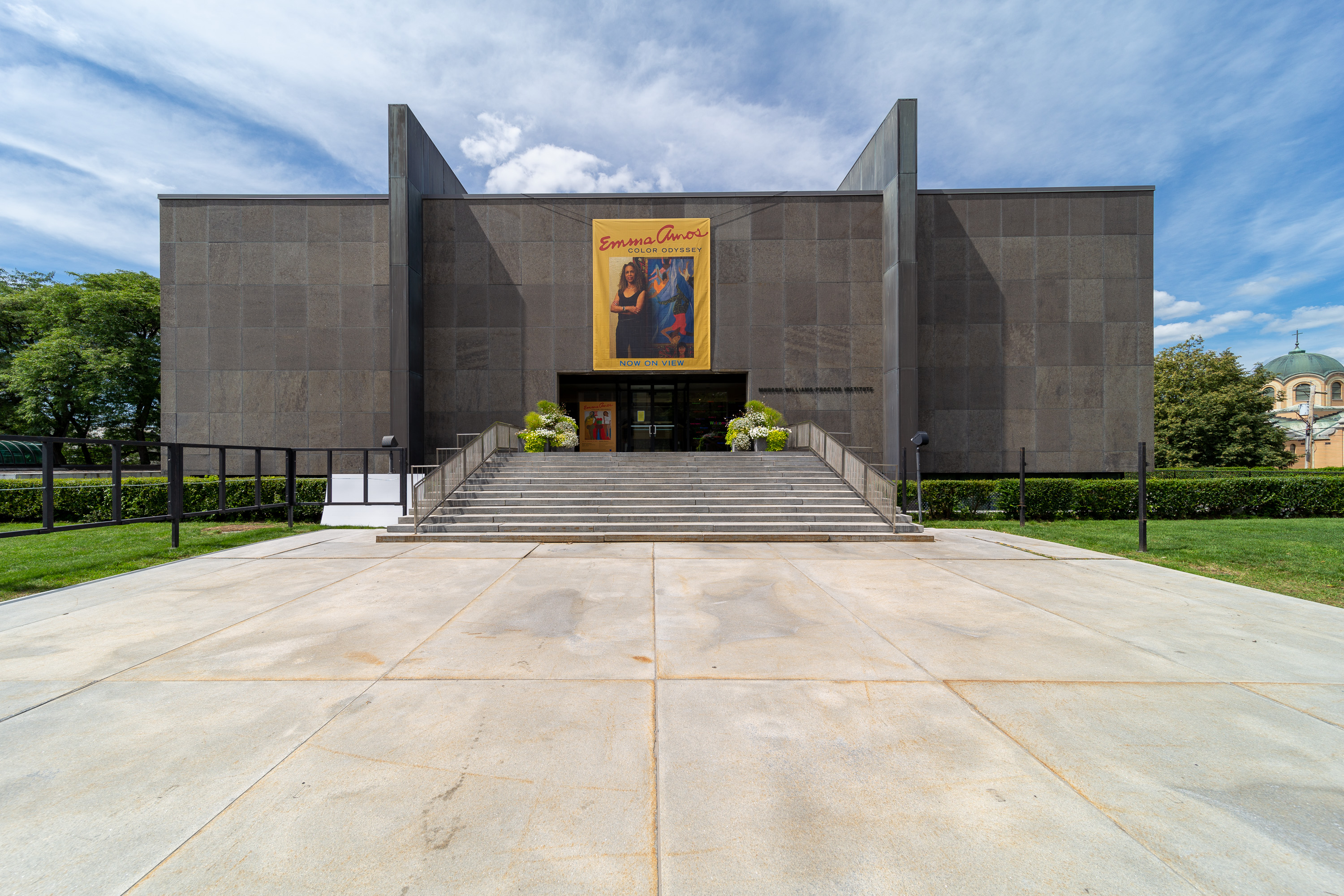
- Munson Museum of Art

- Location within New York Location within the United States
- Location: 310 Genesee St., Utica, New York
- Coordinates: 43°5′49″N 75°14′29″W
- Area: less than one acre
- Built: 1960
- Architect: Philip Johnson
- Architectural style: International-style
- NRHP reference No.: 10000727
- Added to NRHP: September 9, 2010

Munson (formally Munson-Williams-Proctor Arts Institute) is a regional fine arts center founded in 1919 and located in Utica, New York. The institute has three program divisions: museum of art, performing arts and school of art.

== Museum of art ==
The museum of art has a substantial permanent collection of internationally recognized works. They are exhibited in the Munson Museum of Art Building. It is an International-style building designed by architect Philip Johnson and completed in 1960. A model of the building was exhibited in the United States Pavilion at the Brussels' World's Fair of 1958. It is a 60,000 sqft square and supported by eight external ferro-concrete piers, or two on each side. The exterior structural members are clad in bronze and "black" Canadian granite. The windowless cube is set above windowed office areas recessed in a dry moat, giving a "floating" effect. The interior features a two-story central courtyard, illuminated by a skylight, known as the Edward Wales Root Sculpture Court. It also holds an auditorium seating 271. In 2023, as part of a rebranding effort facilitated by a Brooklyn-based design agency, the museum rebranded itself simply "Munson". The museum president stated that despite its familiarity, few people knew the entire 10-syllable name of the museum. It was listed on the National Register of Historic Places in 2010.

Next-door is a Victorian-era Italianate mansion called Fountain Elms, listed on the National Register of Historic Places in 1972. It houses the Munson decorative arts collection. It is connected to the Museum of Art building by an education wing built in 1995.

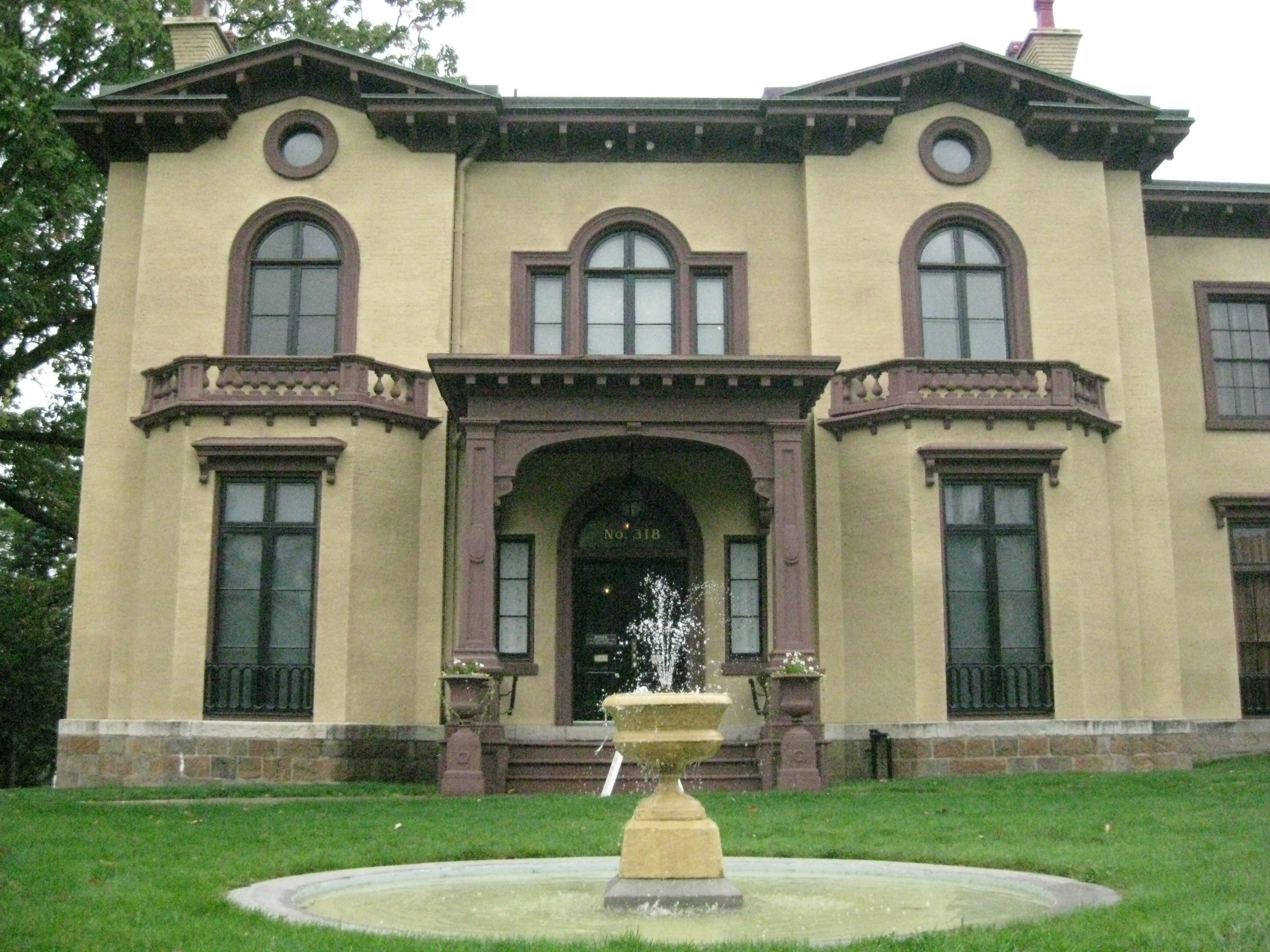
Fountain Elms

The museum has an extensive collection of European and American art, with a permanent collection of over 25,000 works. A highlight of the permanent collection is the first of the two original sets of Thomas Cole's famous series of paintings titled The Voyage of Life: The second set is at the National Gallery Washington, DC.

== School of art ==
The Arts Guild of New York City moved its school to a remodeled garage on the ground of the Institute in 1936 and, under the name of the School of Related Arts and Sciences, began to offer courses in visual arts, the history and philosophy of art, and comparative symbolism. This school, however, was separate from the Institute, which opened its own School of Art in 1941. The school was granted the authority to confer the Bachelor of Fine Arts degree in 1948.

In 1999, Munson became a satellite campus of the Pratt Institute. A program called Pratt at Munson-Williams-Proctor or PrattMWP allows students to study for two years in Utica, New York, called a "Foundations Program", before completing their Bachelor of Fine Arts degree at Pratt Institute's main campus in Brooklyn, New York. PrattMWP is accredited by the National Association of Schools of Art and Design, Middle States Association, and New York State Education Department.

== Selection of notable artists featured in the museum collection ==
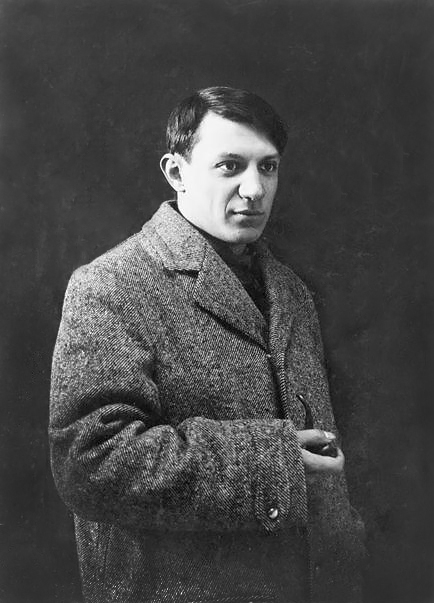
Pablo Picasso

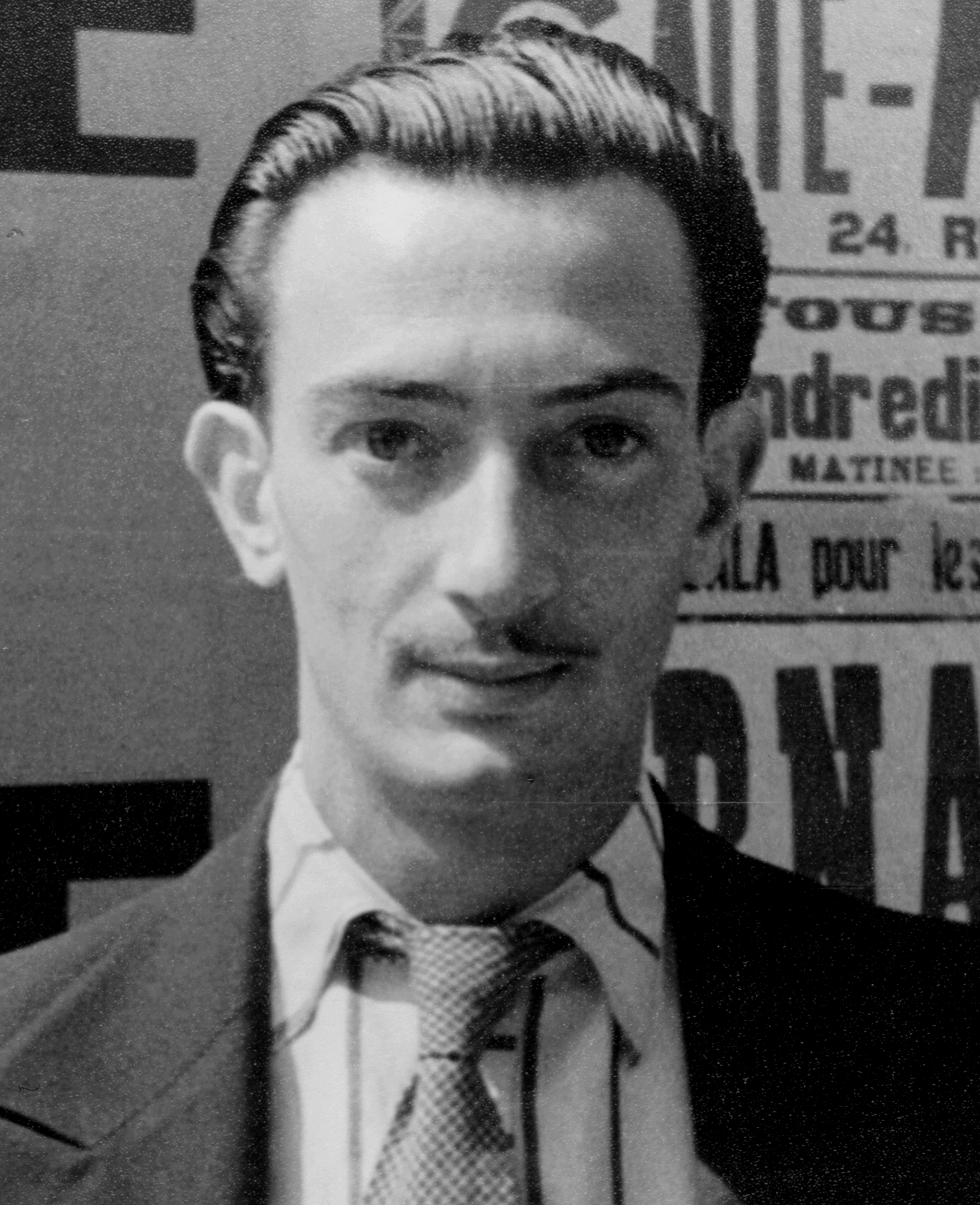
Salvador Dalí

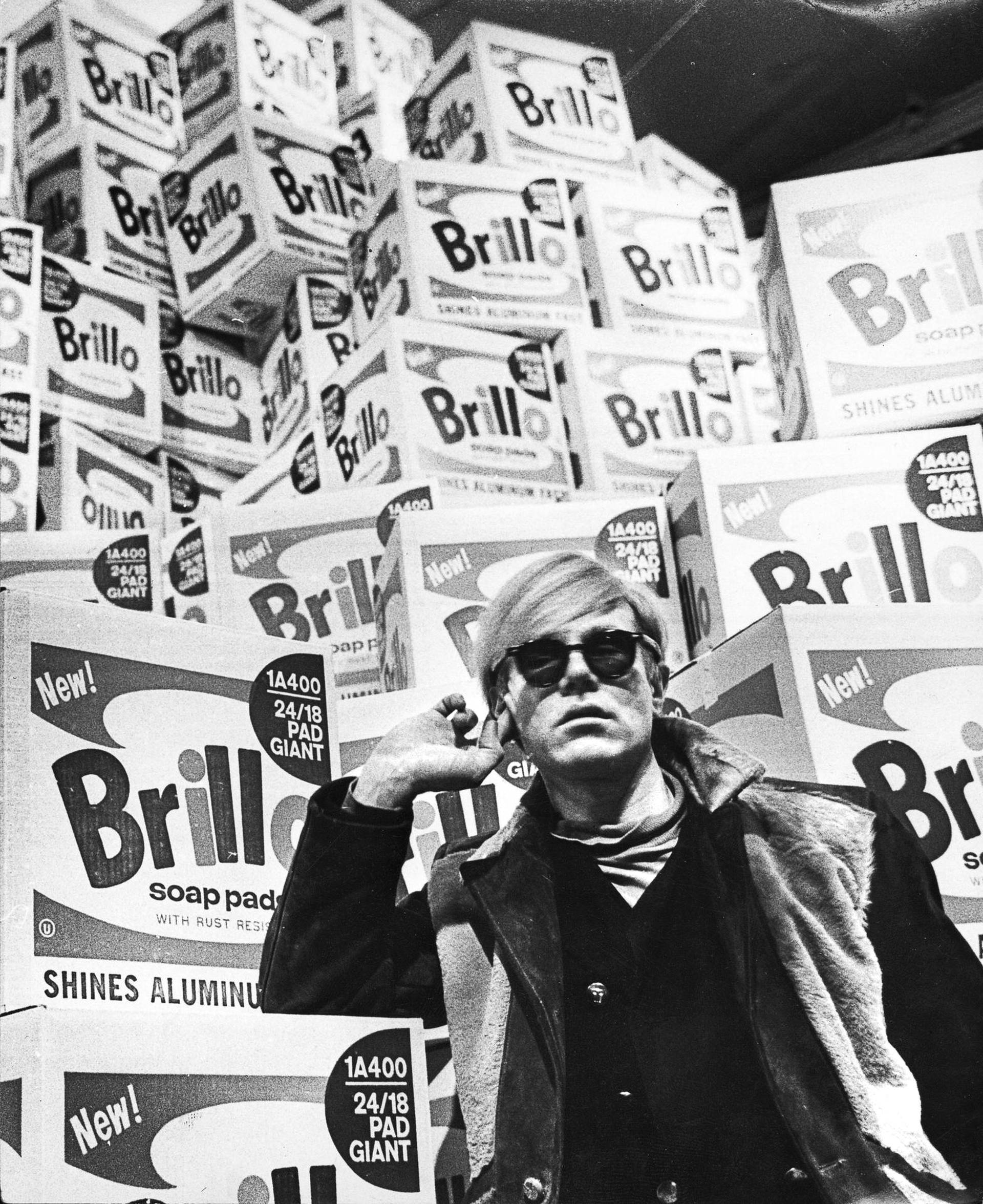
Andy Warhol

Rembrandt

- Emma Amos
- Jean Arp
- Ernst Barlach
- Romare Bearden
- George Bellows
- Louise Bourgeois
- Fidelia Bridges
- Charles E. Burchfield
- William Merritt Chase
- Frederic Edwin Church
- Thomas Cole
- Salvador Dalí
- Stuart Davis
- Charles Demuth
- Albrecht Dürer
- Raymond Duchamp-Villon
- Asher Brown Durand
- Francisco Goya
- Juan Gris
- William Harnett
- Martin Johnson Heade
- Robert Henri
- Winslow Homer
- Edward Hopper
- Jasper Johns
- Eastman Johnson
- Wassily Kandinsky
- Paul Klee
- Willem de Kooning
- Norman Lewis
- Fernand Léger
- George Luks
- Frederick William MacMonnies
- John Marin
- Piet Mondrian
- Georgia O'Keeffe
- Stephen Parrish
- Raphaelle Peale
- John F. Peto
- Pablo Picasso
- Jackson Pollock
- Liliana Porter
- Hiram Powers
- Maurice Prendergast
- Rembrandt
- Mark Rothko
- Alison Saar
- Augustus Saint-Gaudens
- Gino Severini
- Charles Sheeler
- Lorna Simpson
- Gilbert Stuart
- Bill Viola
- Andy Warhol
- James McNeill Whistler

== Selected works in the museum collection by chronological order ==
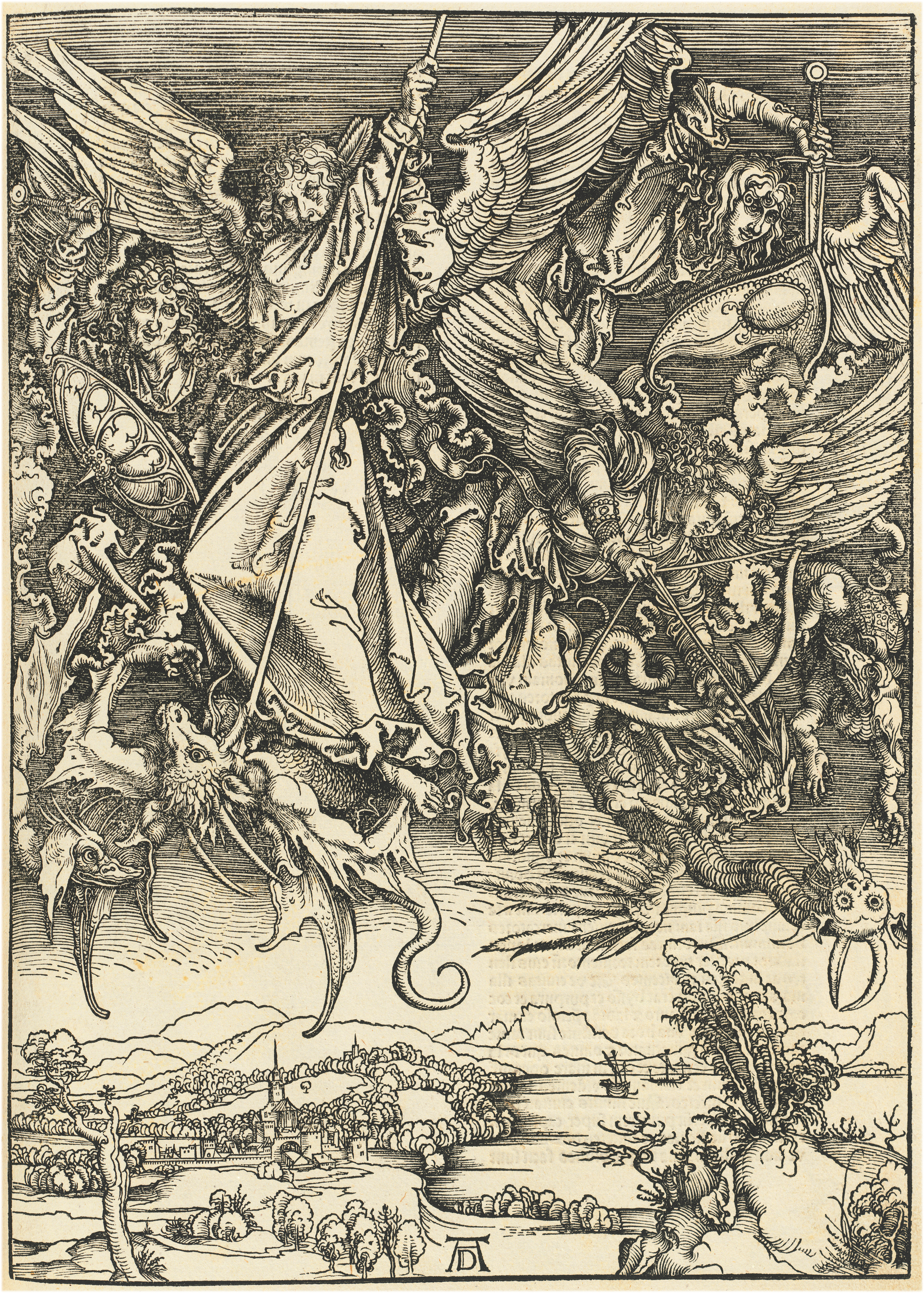
Saint Michael Fighting the Dragon (1498) by Albrecht Dürer

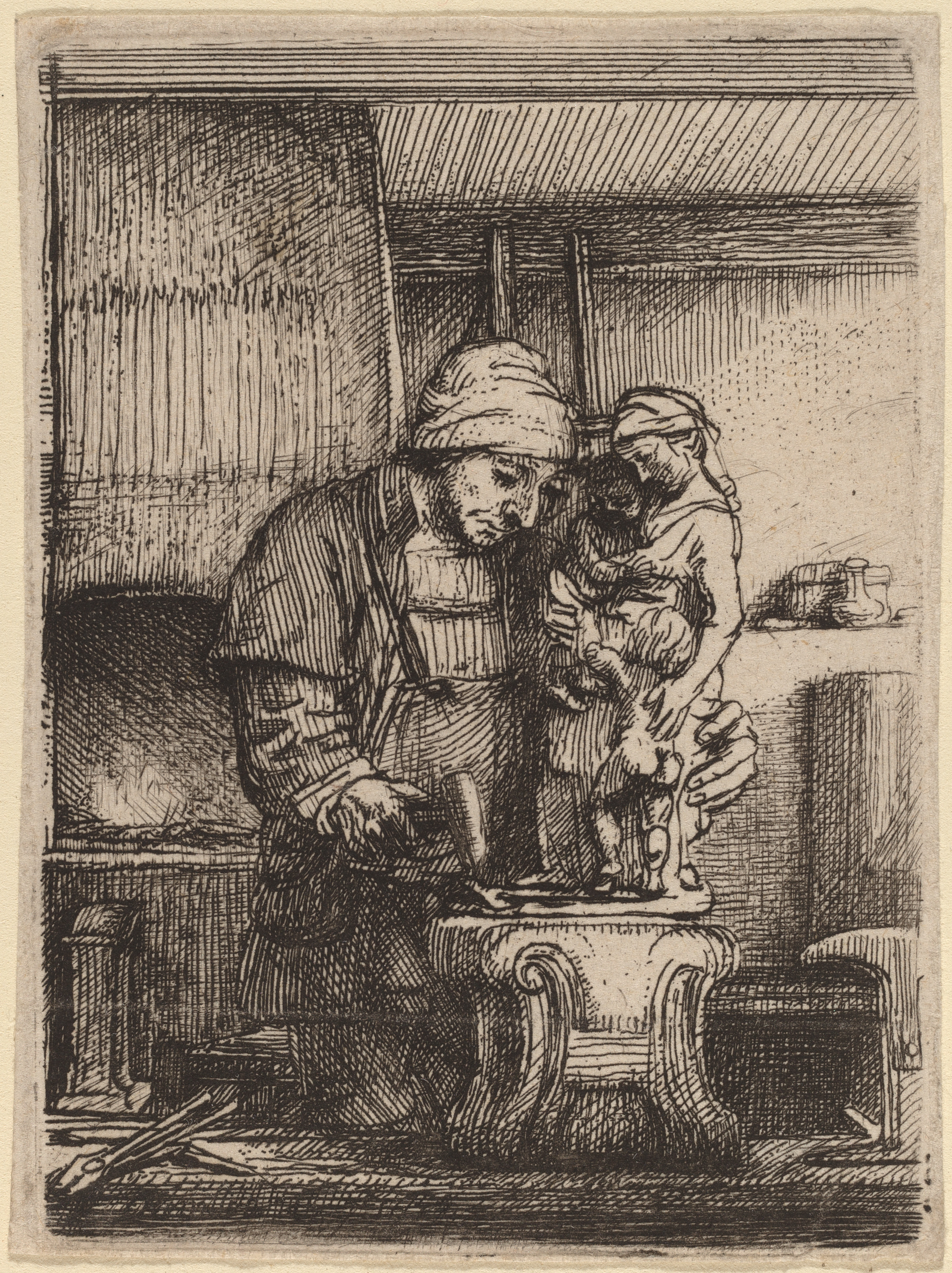
The Goldsmith (1655) by Rembrandt Van Rijn

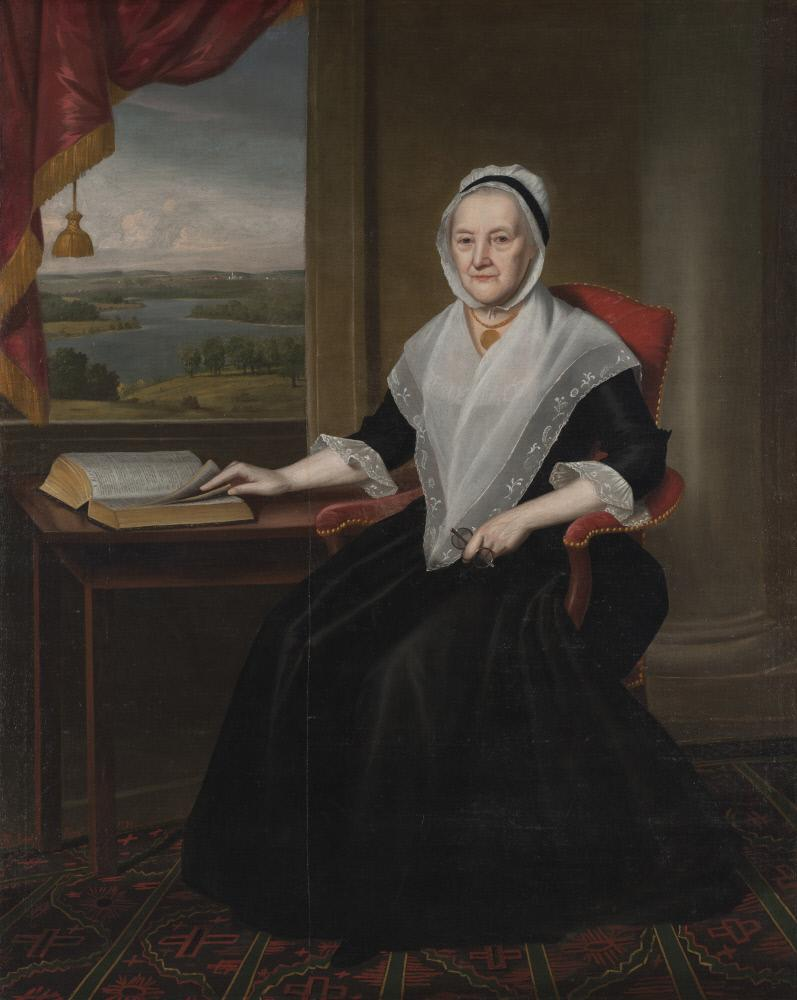
Portrait of Bethia Tyler Watson (1791) by Ralph Earl

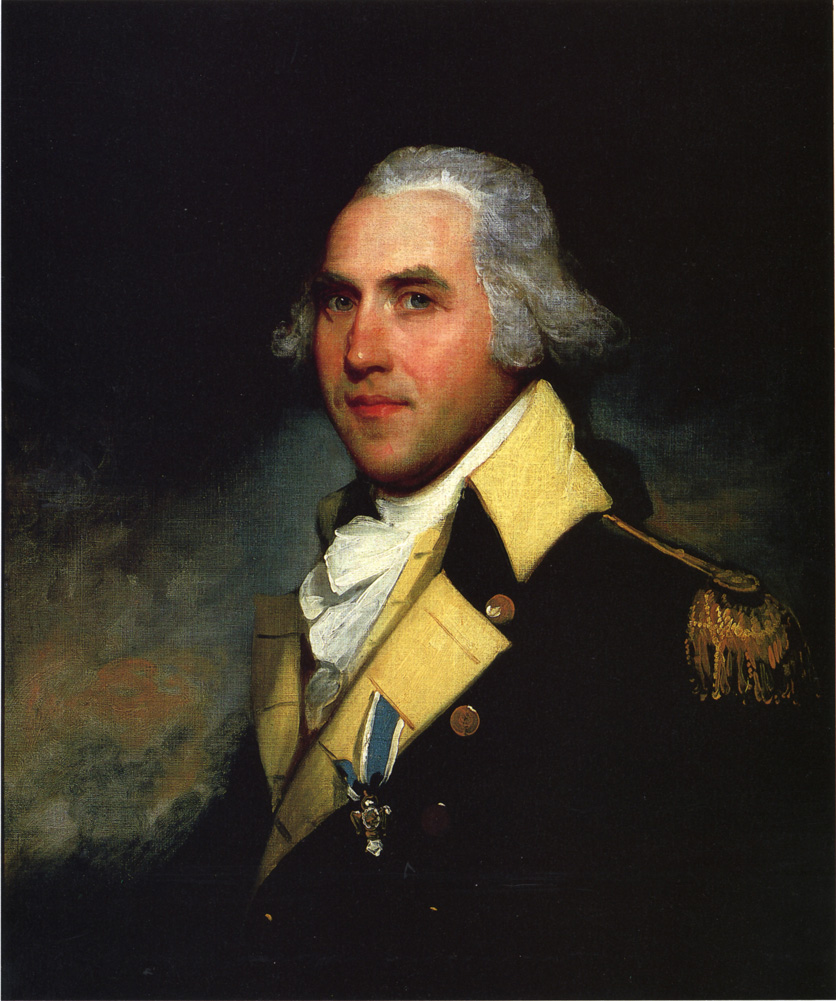
Portrait of General Peter Gansevoort (1794) by Gilbert Stuart

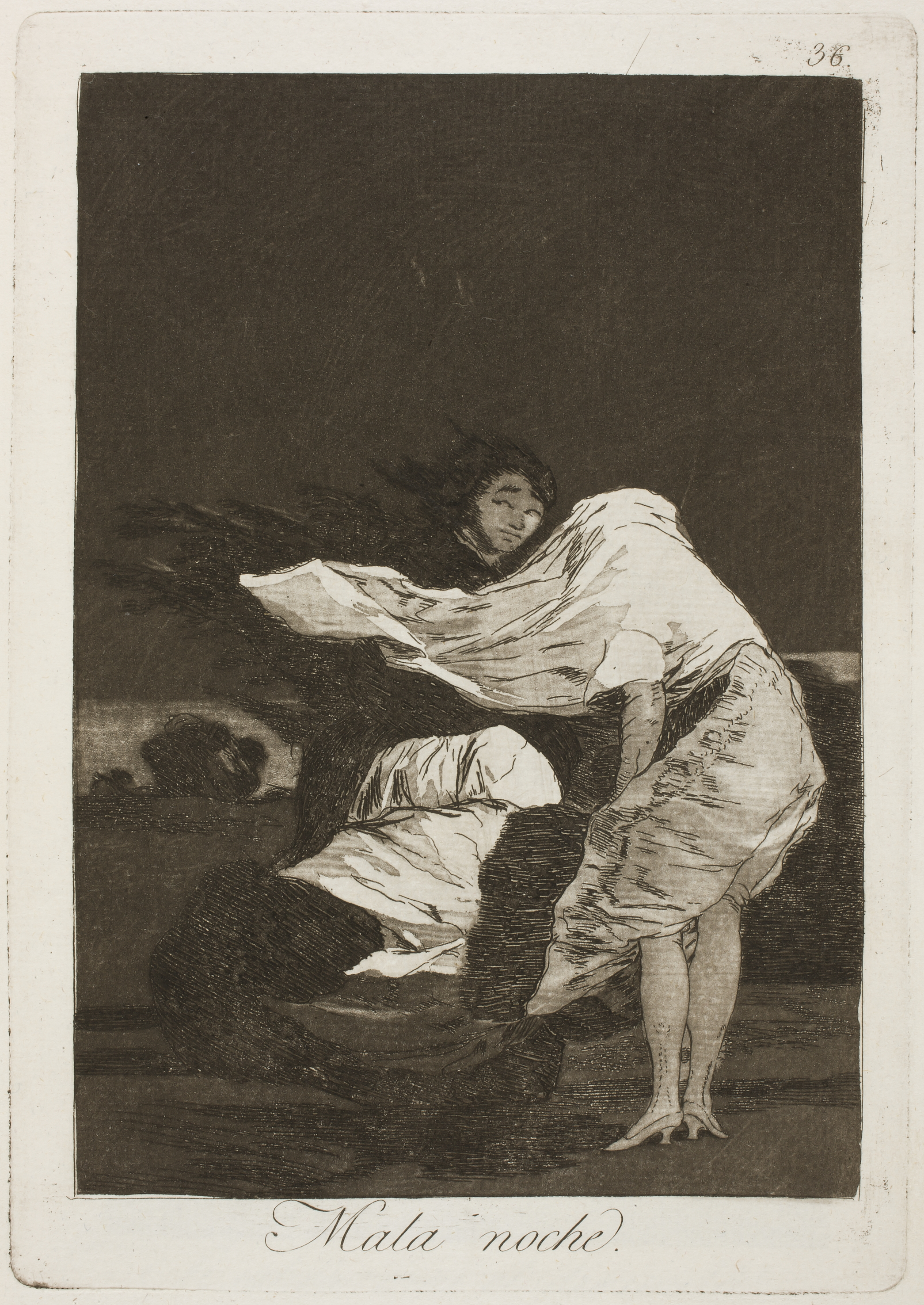
Mama Noche (The Caprices, 1803) - Mala Noche

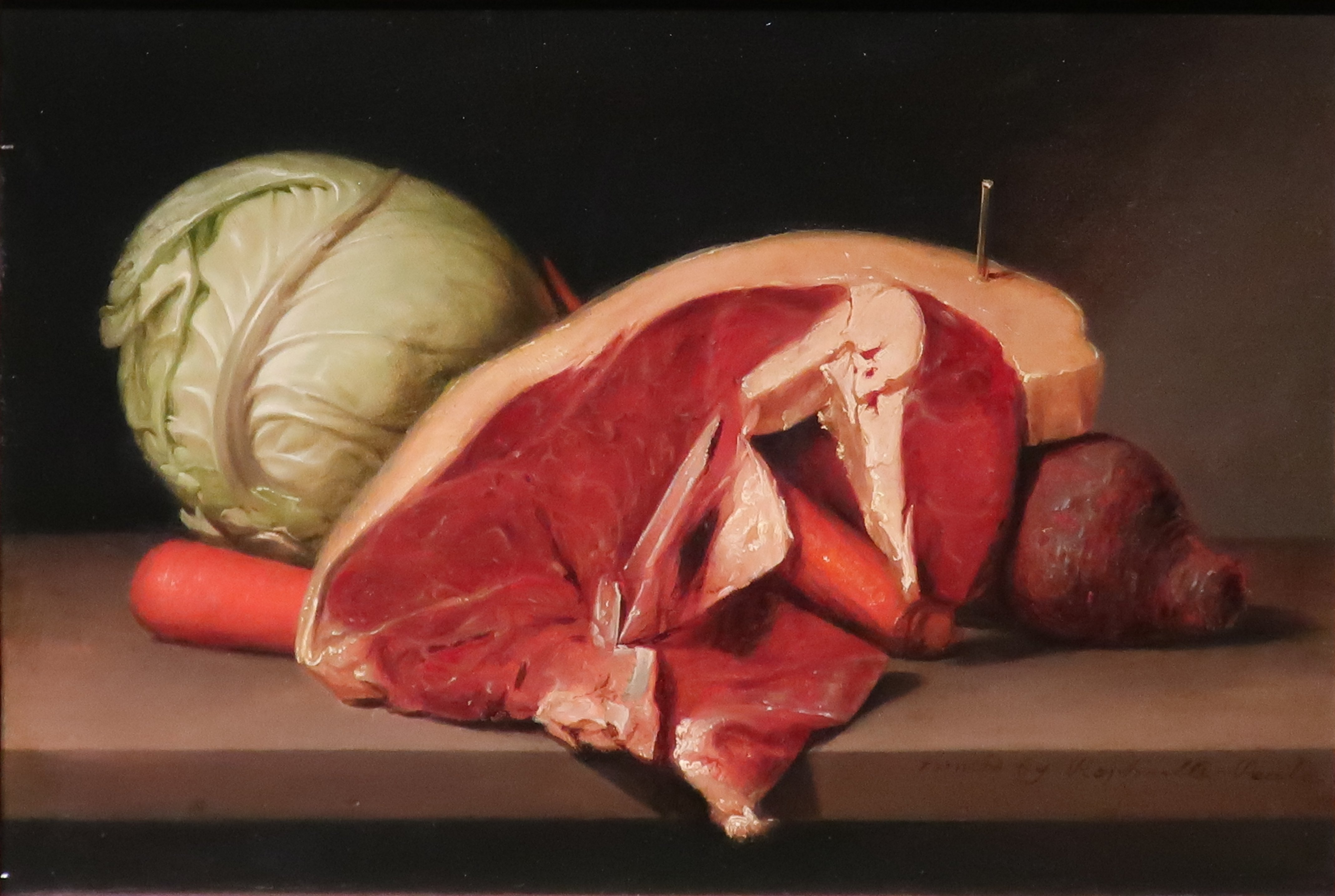
Still Life with Steak (1816-17) by Raphaelle Peale

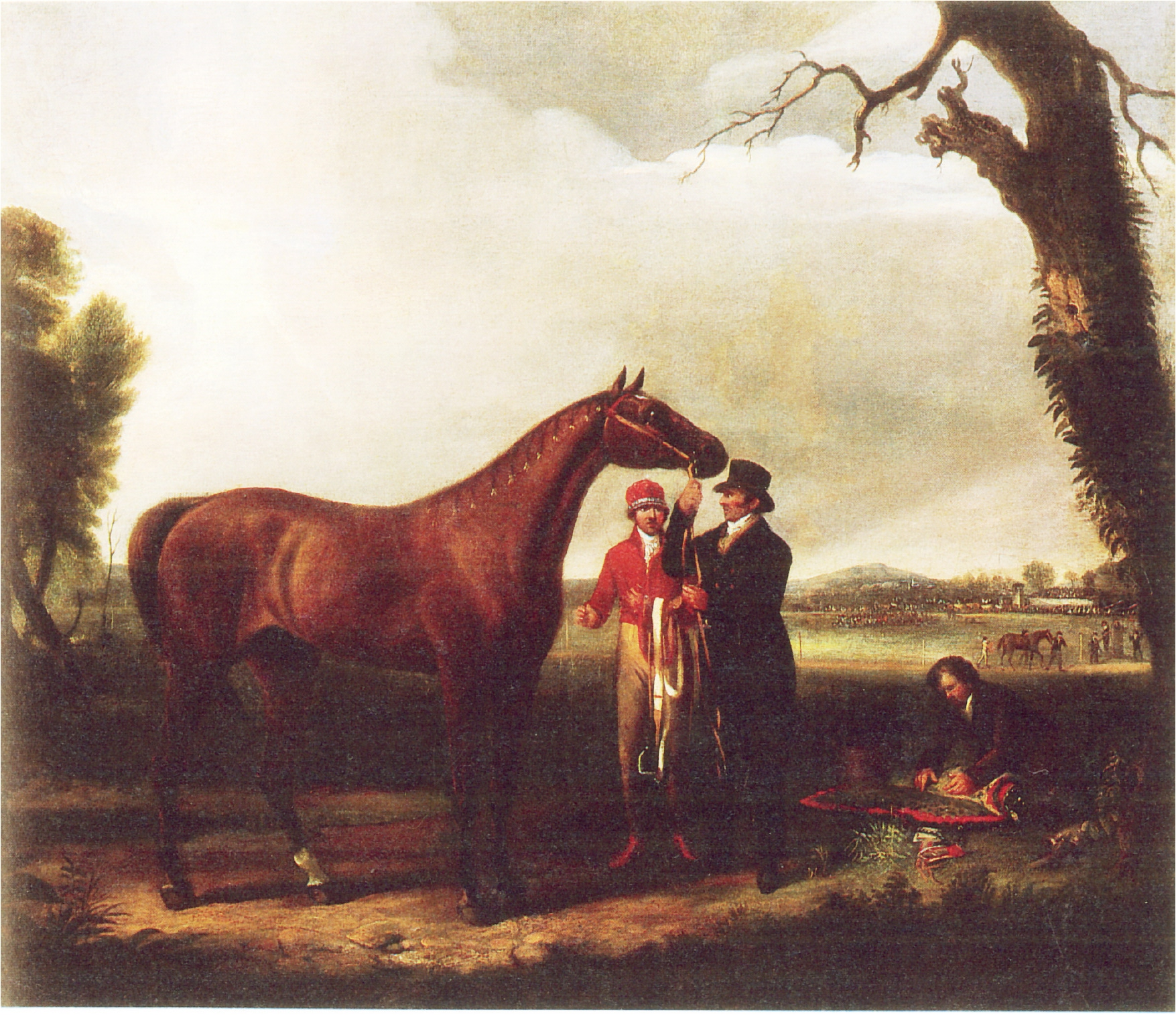
Eclipse, with Owner (1823) by Alvan Fisher

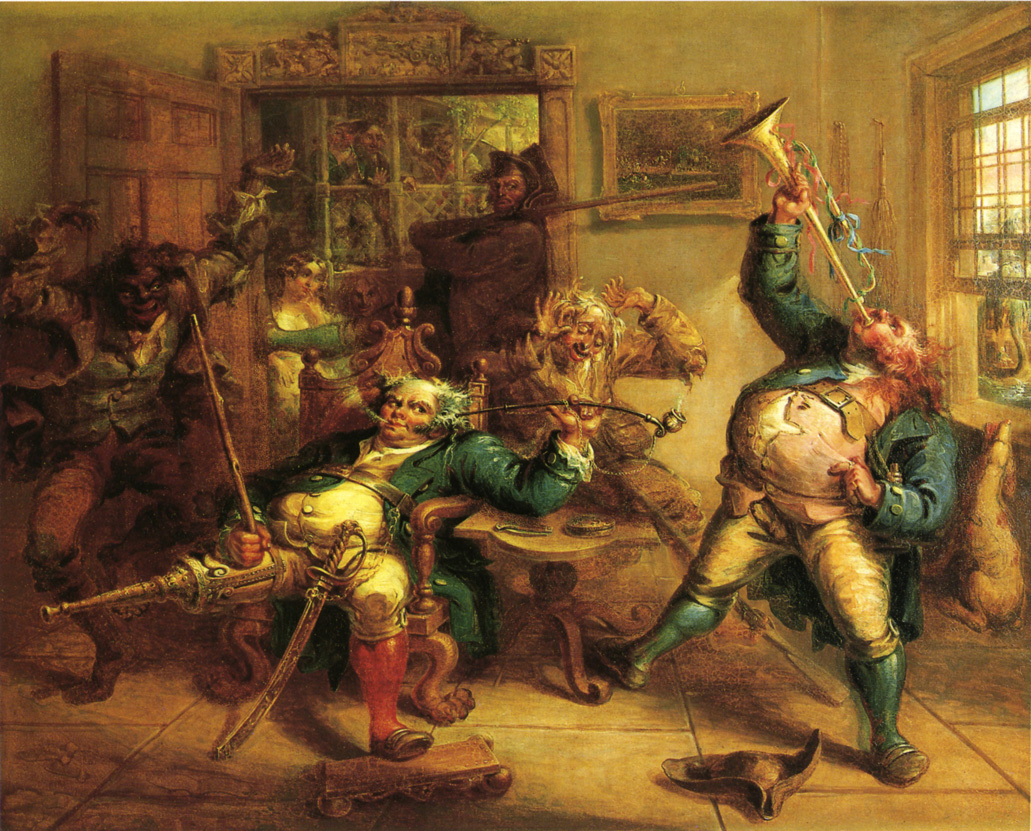
Antony van Corlear Brought into the Presence of Peter Stuyvesant (1839) by John Quidor

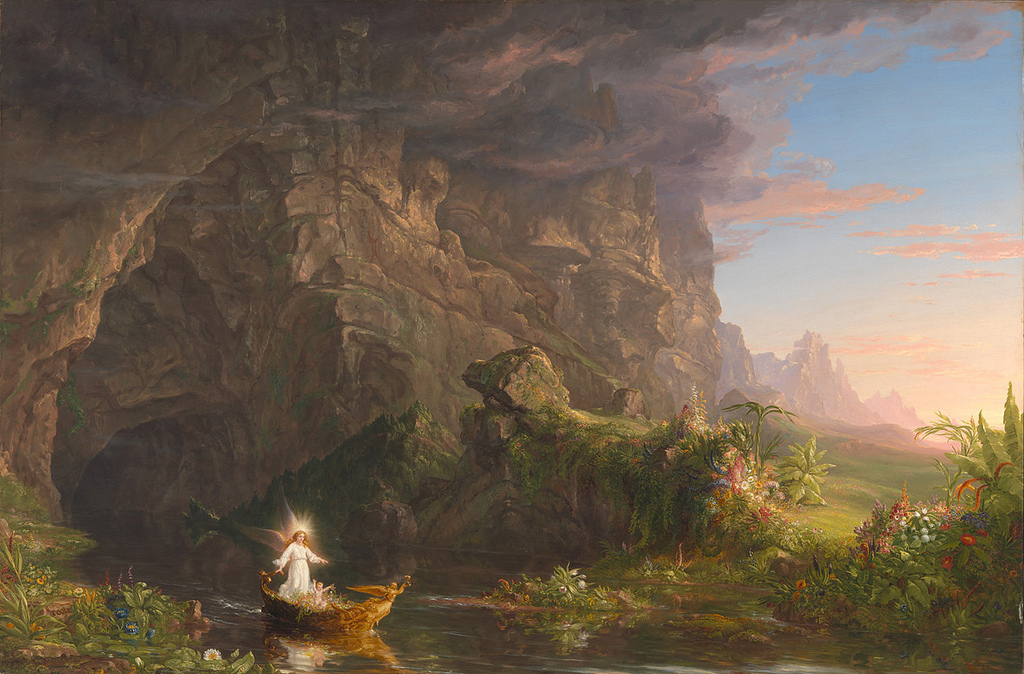
The Voyage of Life (Childhood, 1840) by Thomas Cole

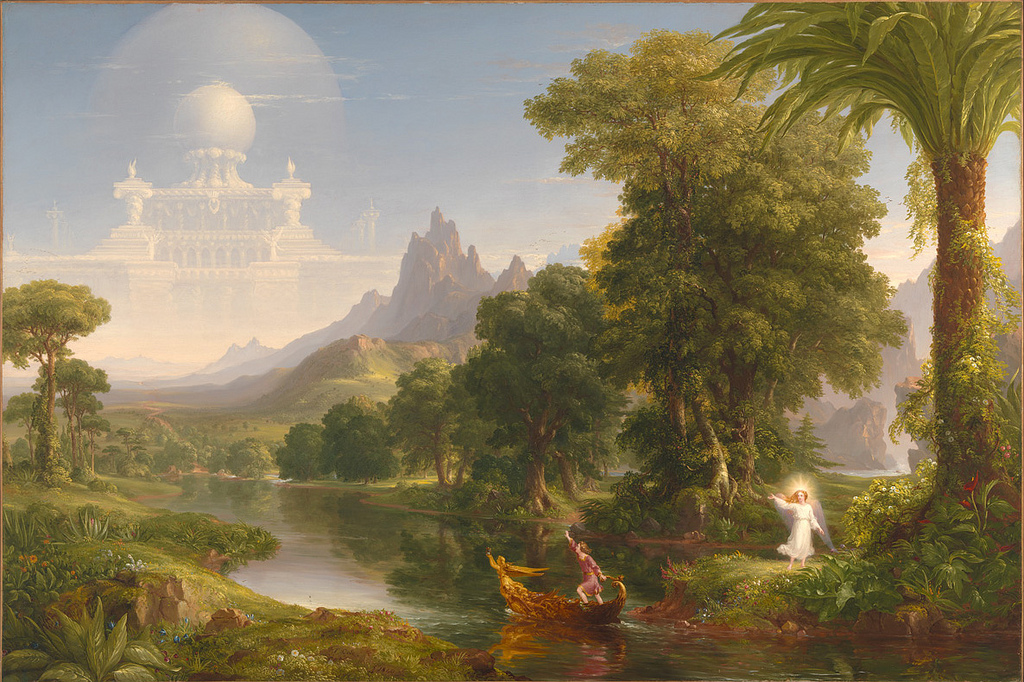
The Voyage of Life (Youth, 1840) by Thomas Cole

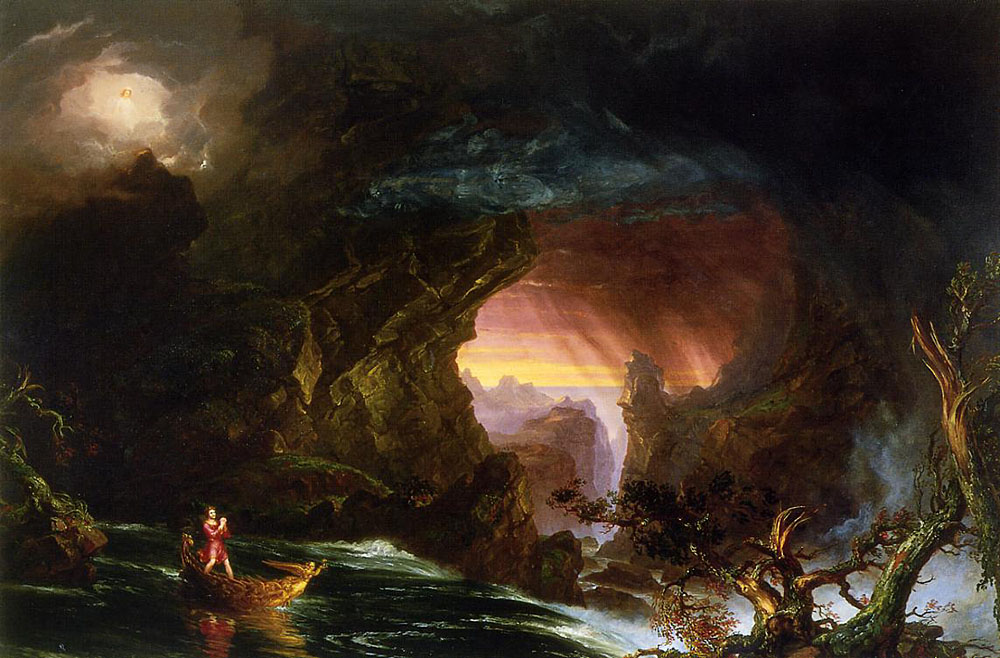
The Voyage of Life (Manhood, 1840) by Thomas Cole

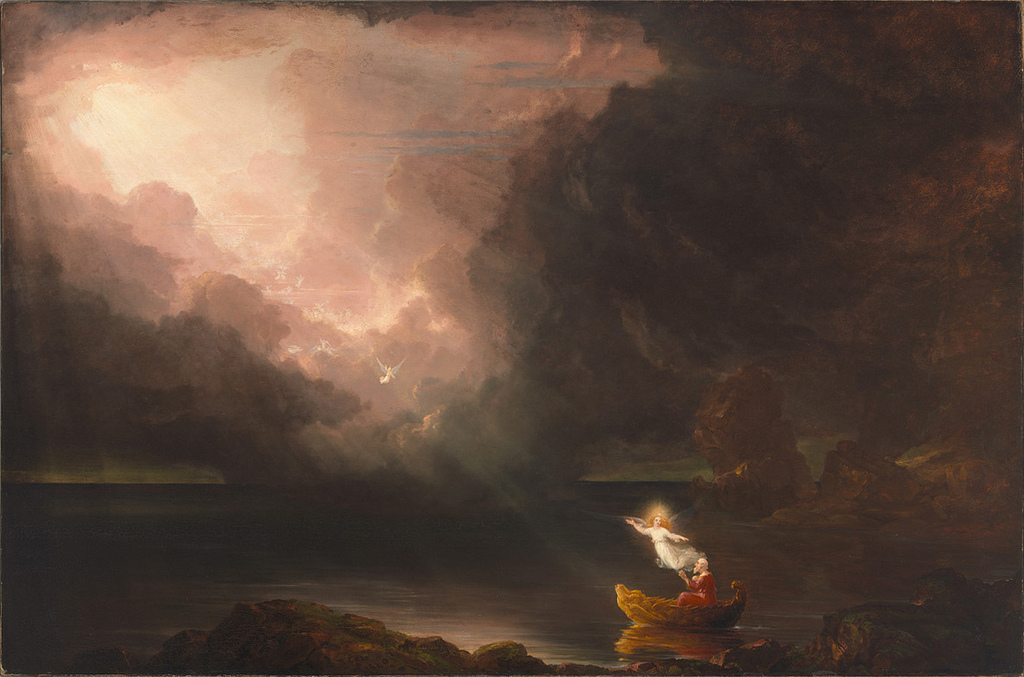
The Voyage of Life (Old Age, 1840) by Thomas Cole

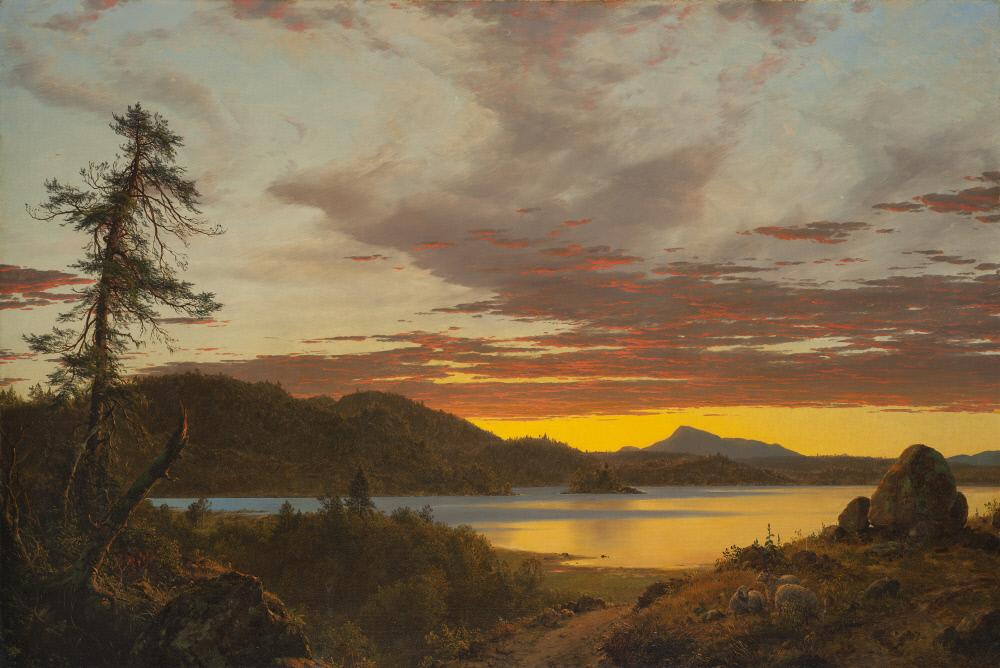
Sunset (1856) by Frederic Edwin Church

Vale of Kashmir (1864) by Robert Duncanson

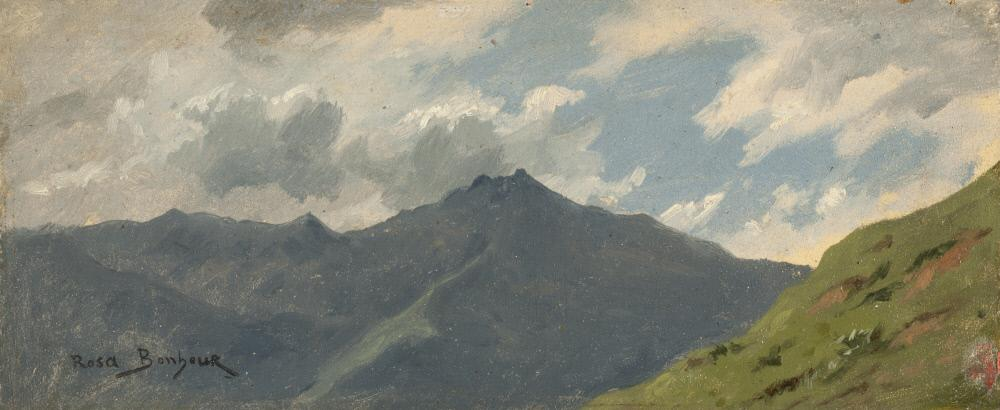
Mountains (1875) by Rosa Bonheur

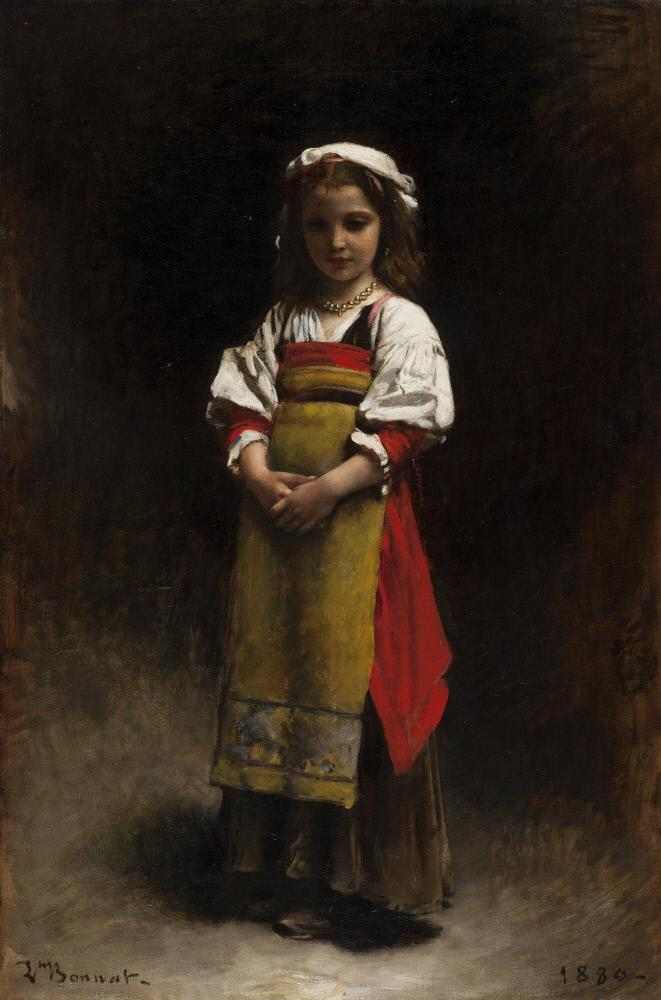
Italian Girl (1880) by Léon Bonnat

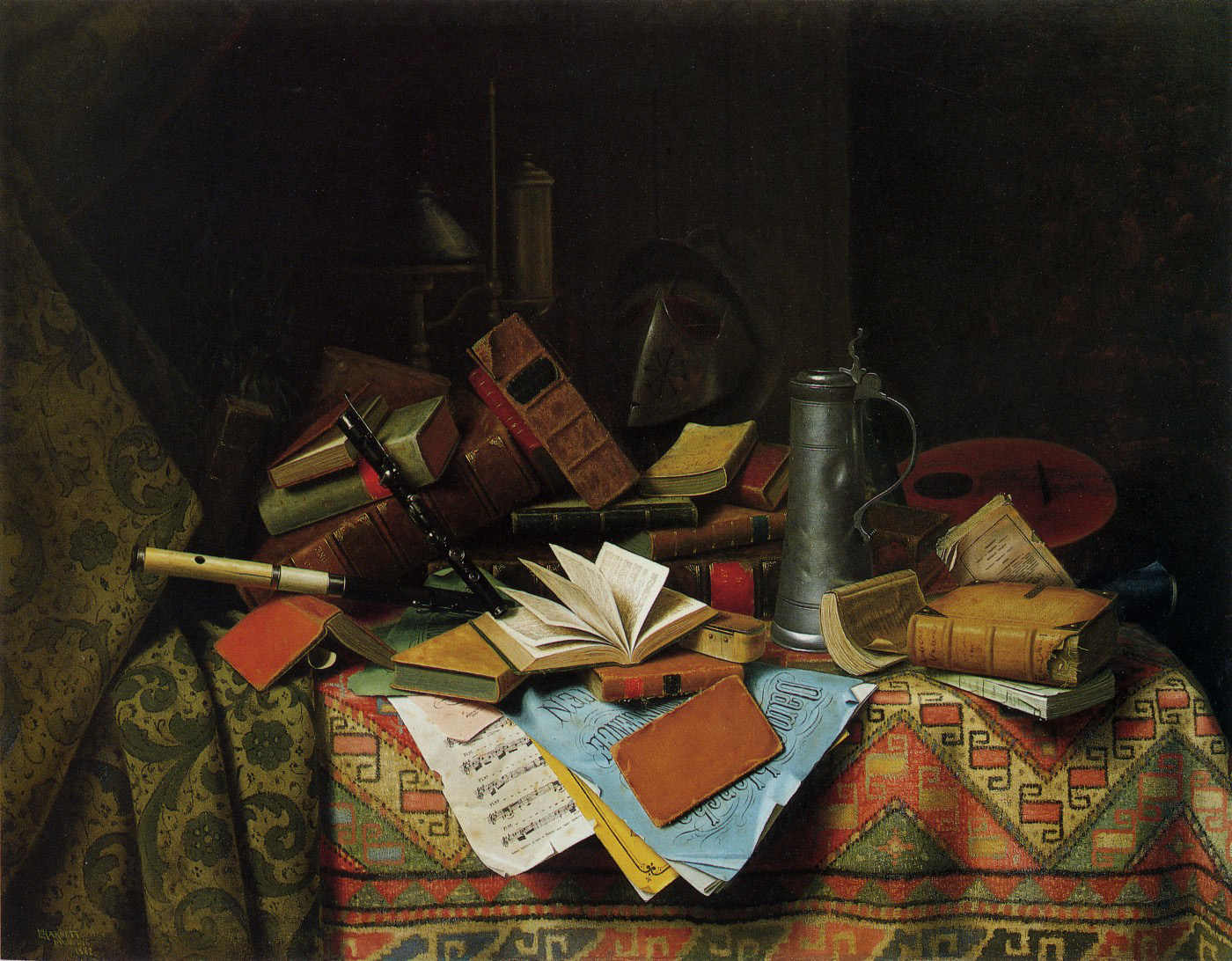
A Study Table (1882) by William Michael Harnett

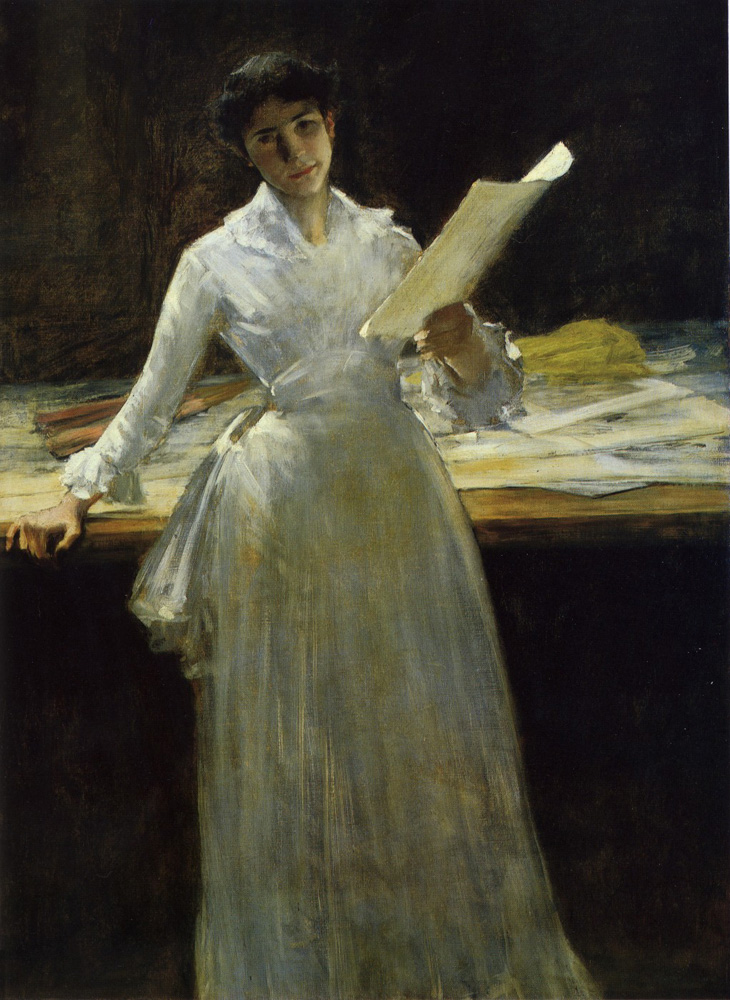
Memories (1885) by William Merritt Chase

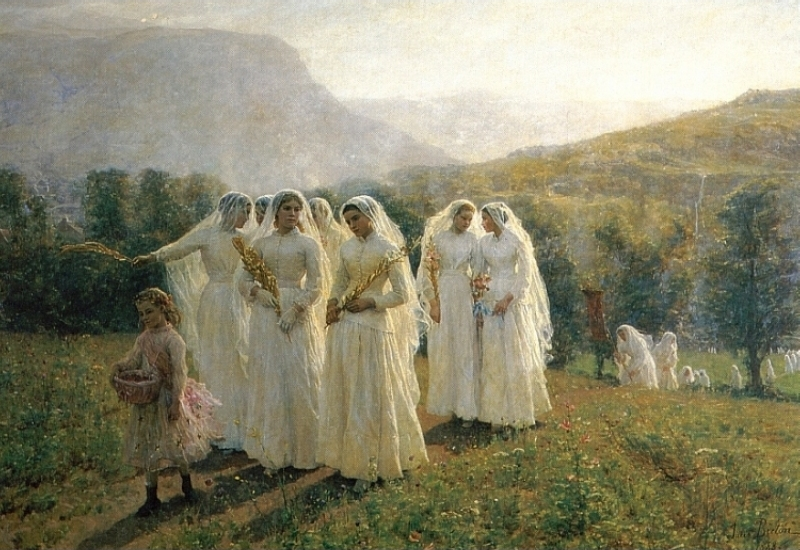
Young Women Going to a Procession (1888) by Jules Breton

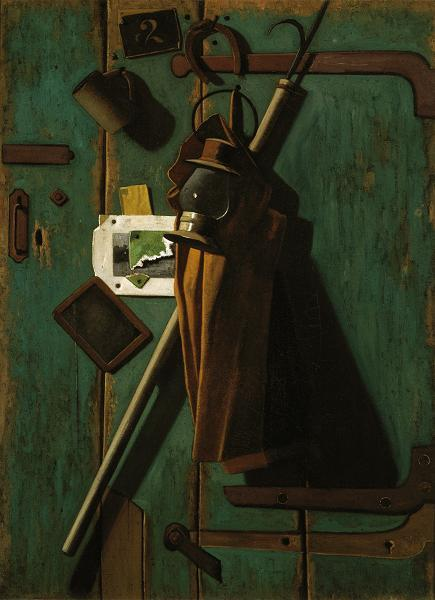
Fish House Door with Eel Basket (1890-99) by John Peto

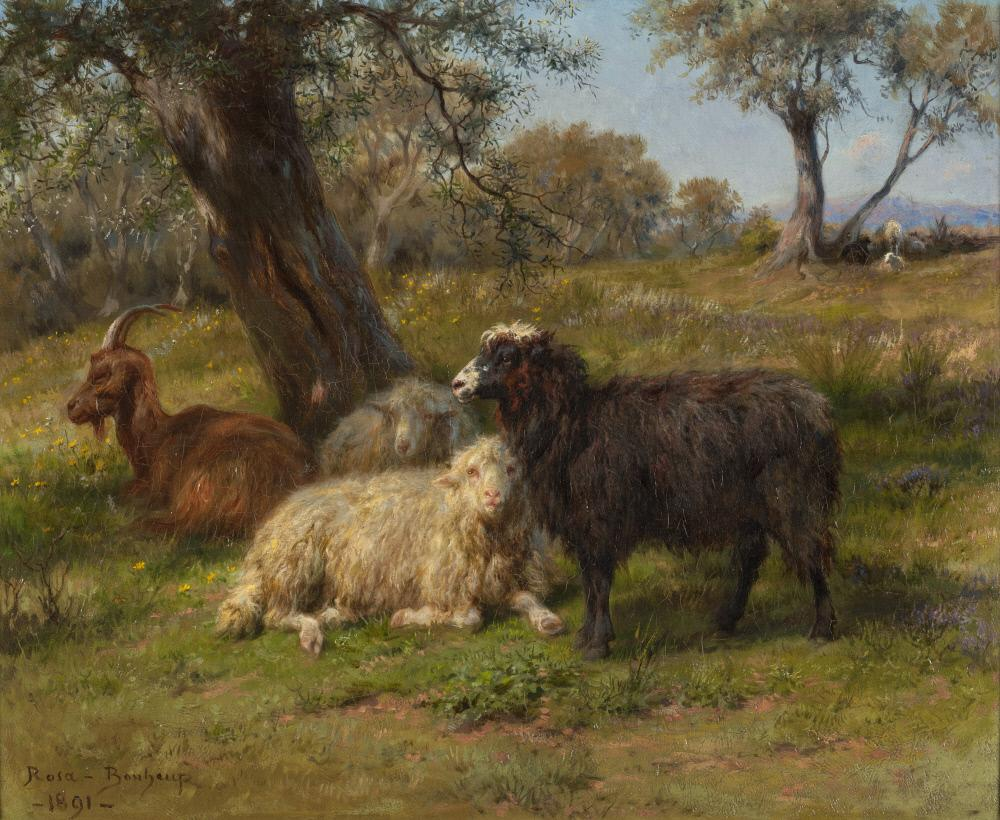
Sheep and Goats (1891) by Rosa Bonheur

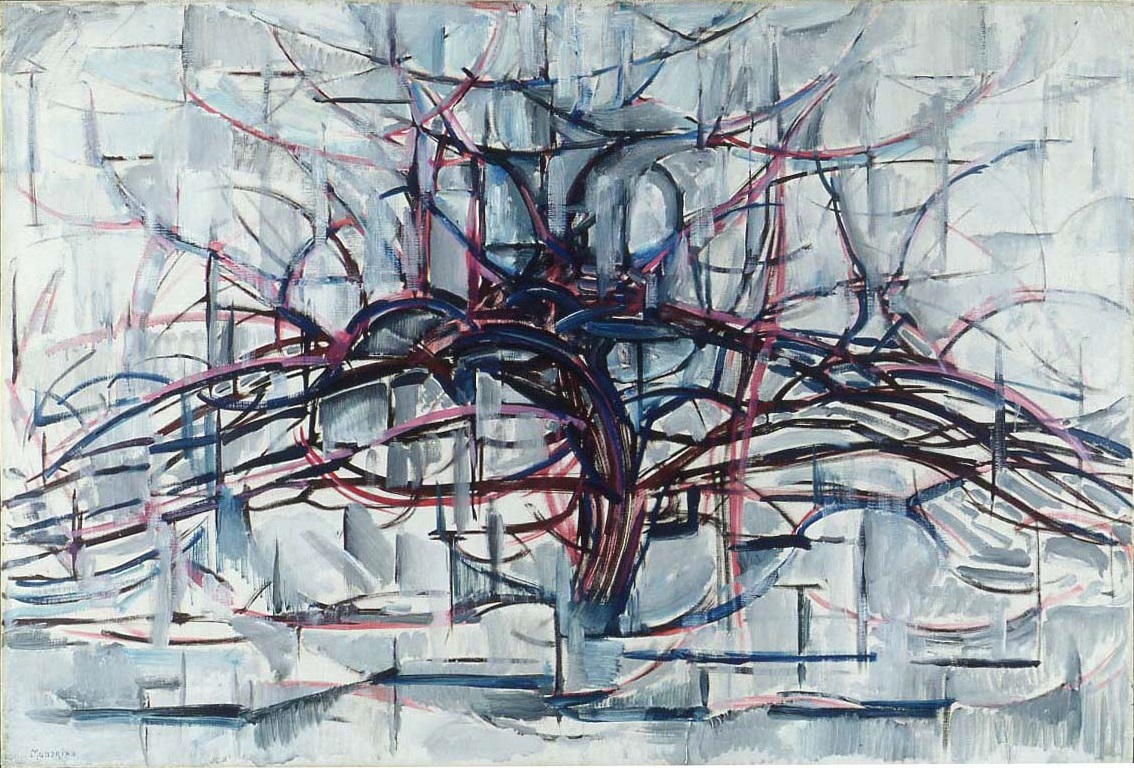
Tree (Horizontal Tree) (1912) by Piet Mondrian

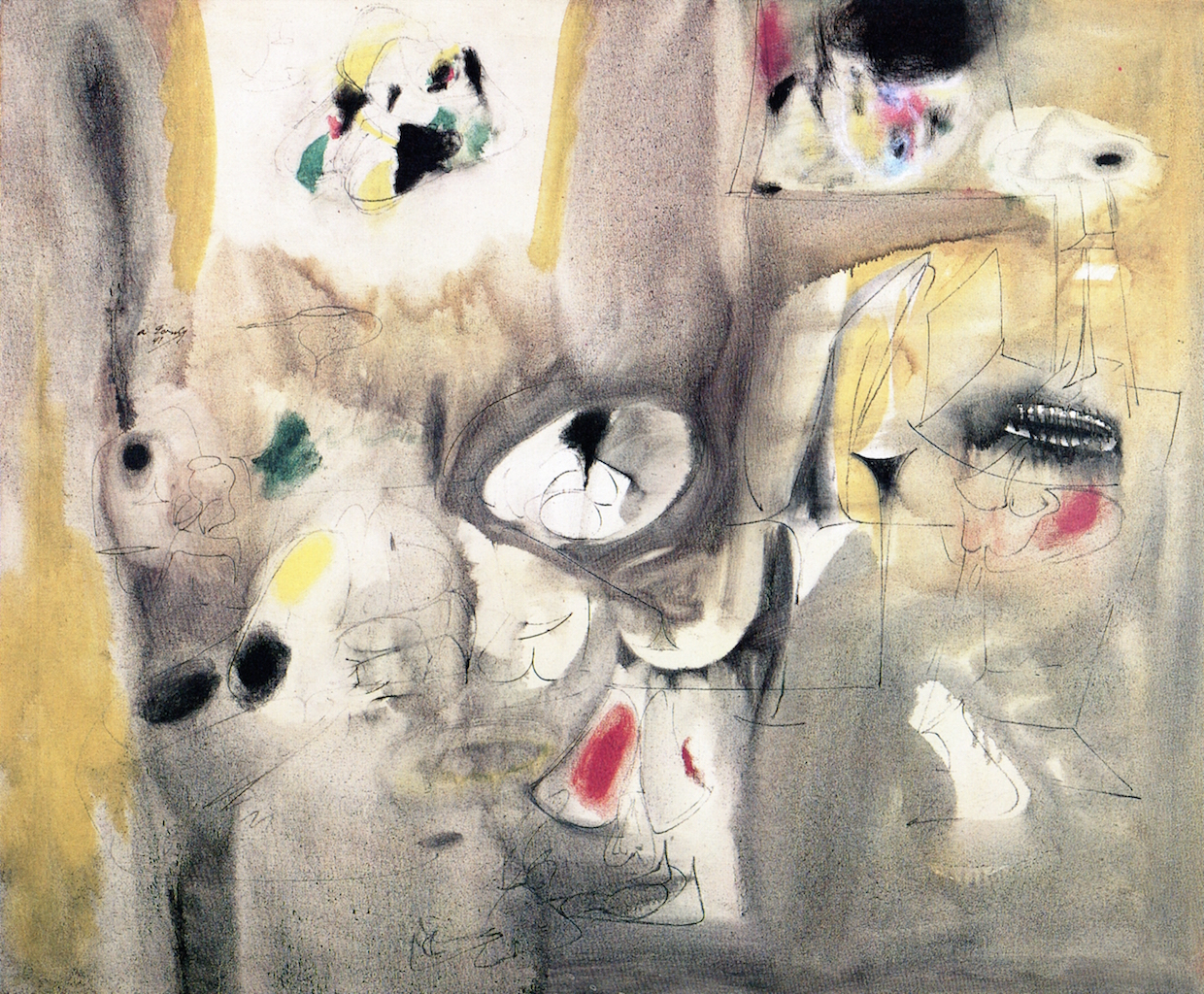
Making the Calendar (1947) by Arshile Gorky
