= List of people from Utica, New York =

This article lists notable people from Utica, New York.

== From the City of Utica ==
=== Academics and scientists ===
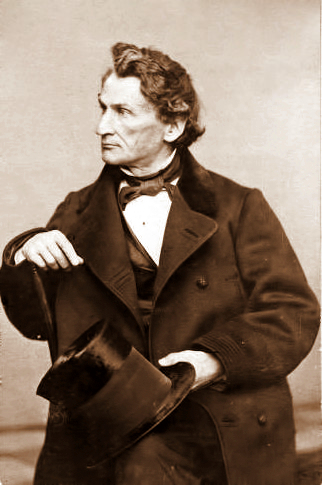
James Dwight Dana

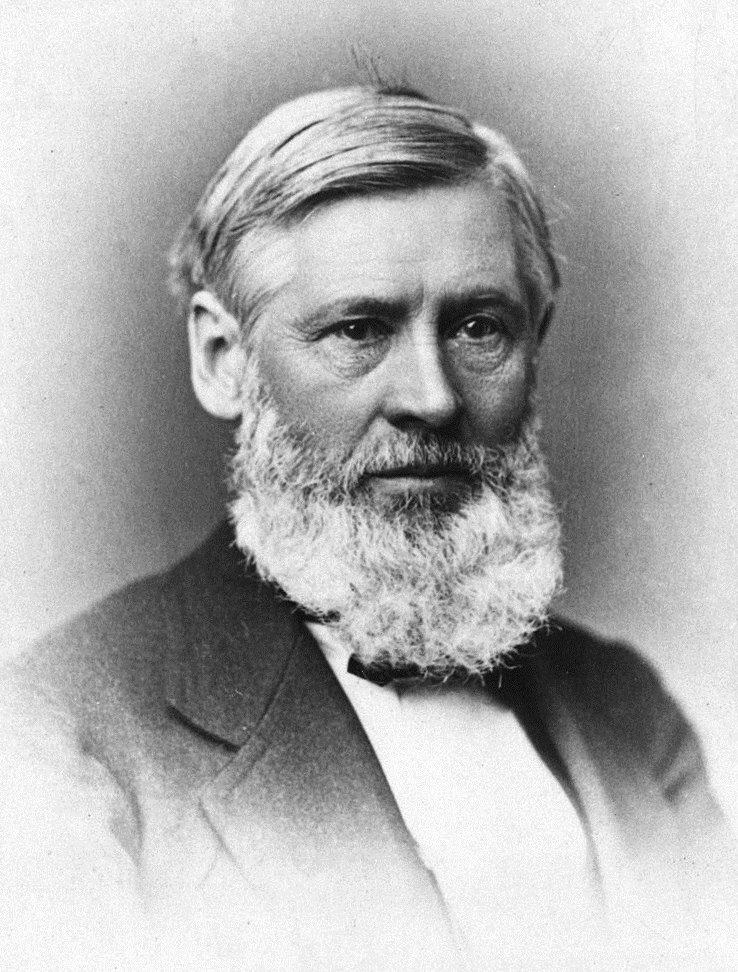
Asa Gray

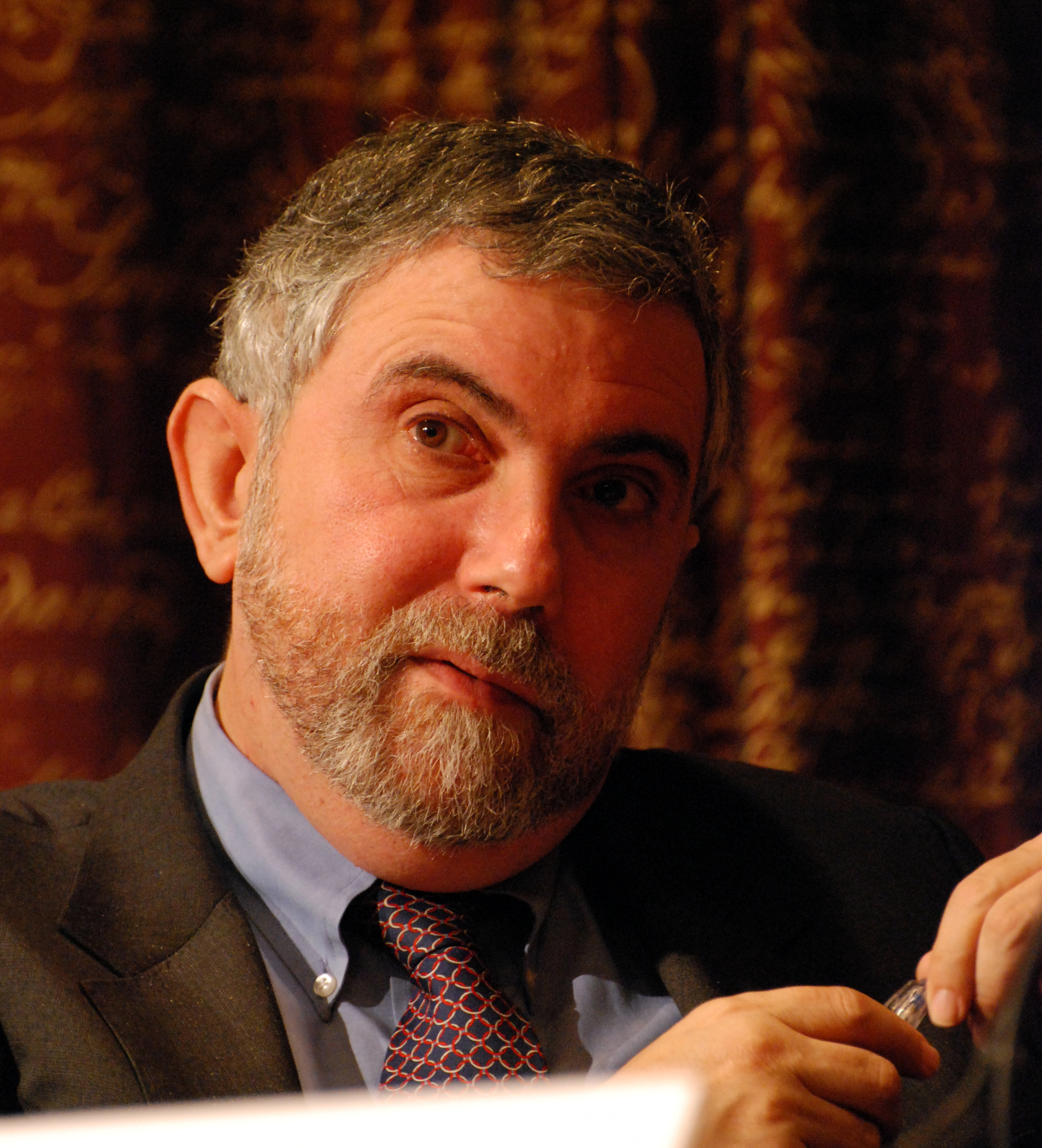
Paul Krugman

- Henry D. Abelove – historian and literary critic
- Elsa Guerdrum Allen – ornithologist, lecturer, and author
- Daniel Barwick – higher education administrator, teacher, author, fundraiser, journalist, and podcaster; president of Independence Community College
- Albert Perry Brigham – geologist
- Amariah Brigham – psychiatrist and founding member of American Psychiatric Association
- Robert E. Brown – ethnomusicologist; coined the term "world music"
- John Seely Brown – organizational studies researcher and author; director of PARC and chief scientist at Xerox
- Wylie Burke – Chair of the Department of Bioethics and Humanities at the University of Washington and founding co-director of the Northwest-Alaska Pharmacogenomics Research Network
- James Dwight Dana – geologist, mineralogist, volcanologist, and zoologist
- Bob Van Dillen – meteorologist
- Elizabeth E. Farrell – educator
- Russell H. Fazio – psychologist and professor at Ohio State University
- Henry S. Fitch – herpetologist
- Asa Gray – botanist
- John P. Gray – psychiatrist; psychiatric expert in the trial for the assassination of President James A. Garfield and superintendent of the Utica Psychiatric Center
- Clara Whitehill Hunt – teacher, librarian, writer, and advocate for children's library services
- Marilyn E. Jacox – physical chemist
- Milton Kerker – physical chemist; namesake of the Kerker effect
- Paul Krugman – economist; professor at the Graduate Center of the City University of New York; columnist for the New York Times
- Anthony Lazzaro – vice president of the University of Southern California
- Cherilla Storrs Lowrey – educator and clubwoman; founder and chairwoman of The Outdoor Circle
- Matthew D. Mann – gynecologist; surgeon who operated on President William McKinley after he was shot
- Walter C. Michels – physicist and professor at Bryn Mawr College
- Eugene Paul Nassar – writer, editor, professor, and literary critic
- Otto M. Nikodym – mathematician
- Christian Heinrich Friedrich Peters – astronomer
- John Ballard Rendall – president of Lincoln University, Latin professor, member of Pennsylvania House of Representatives, and minister
- Robert J. Sampson – sociologist, president of the American Society of Criminology, and Harvard professor
- Hermann von Wechlinger Schulte – anatomist and dean of Creighton University School of Medicine
- Deborah F. Stanley – chancellor of the State University of New York and president of the State University of New York at Oswego
- Susan Stone – nurse midwife; president of Frontier Nursing University
- Walter Sutton – geneticist and biologist; co-developer of the Boveri–Sutton chromosome theory
- Michael Sweet – computer scientist known for being the original developer of CUPS
- E. Fuller Torrey – psychiatrist and schizophrenia researcher
- Samuel Wells Williams – linguist, sinologist, and missionary
- Sam Wineburg – educational and cognitive psychologist
- George Norton Wolcott – entomologist
- Peter T. Wolczanski – chemist and Cornell professor
- Mary E. Young – historian

=== Actors and entertainers ===
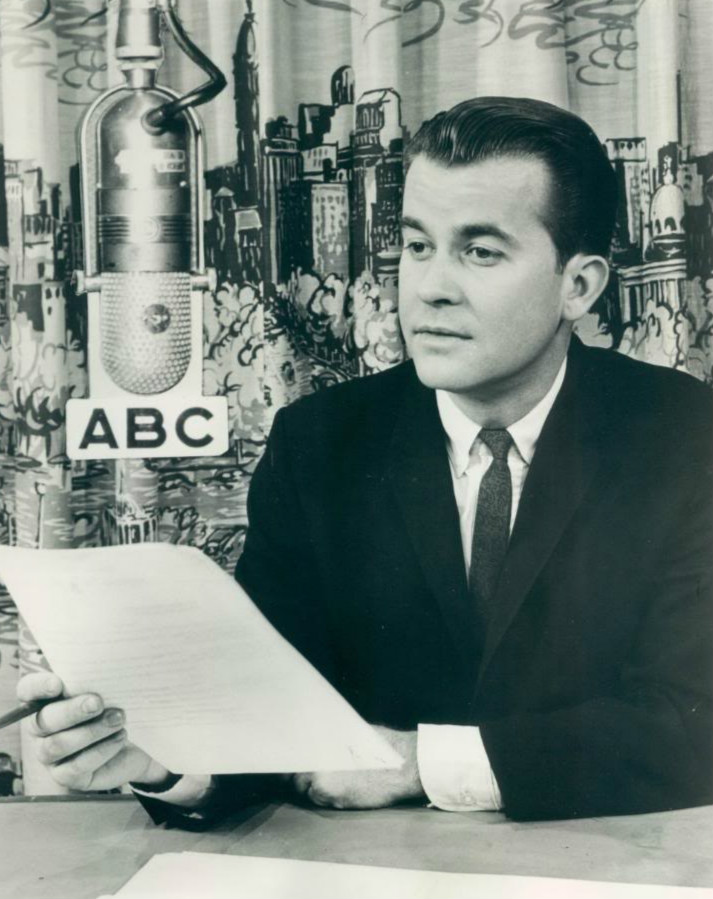
Dick Clark

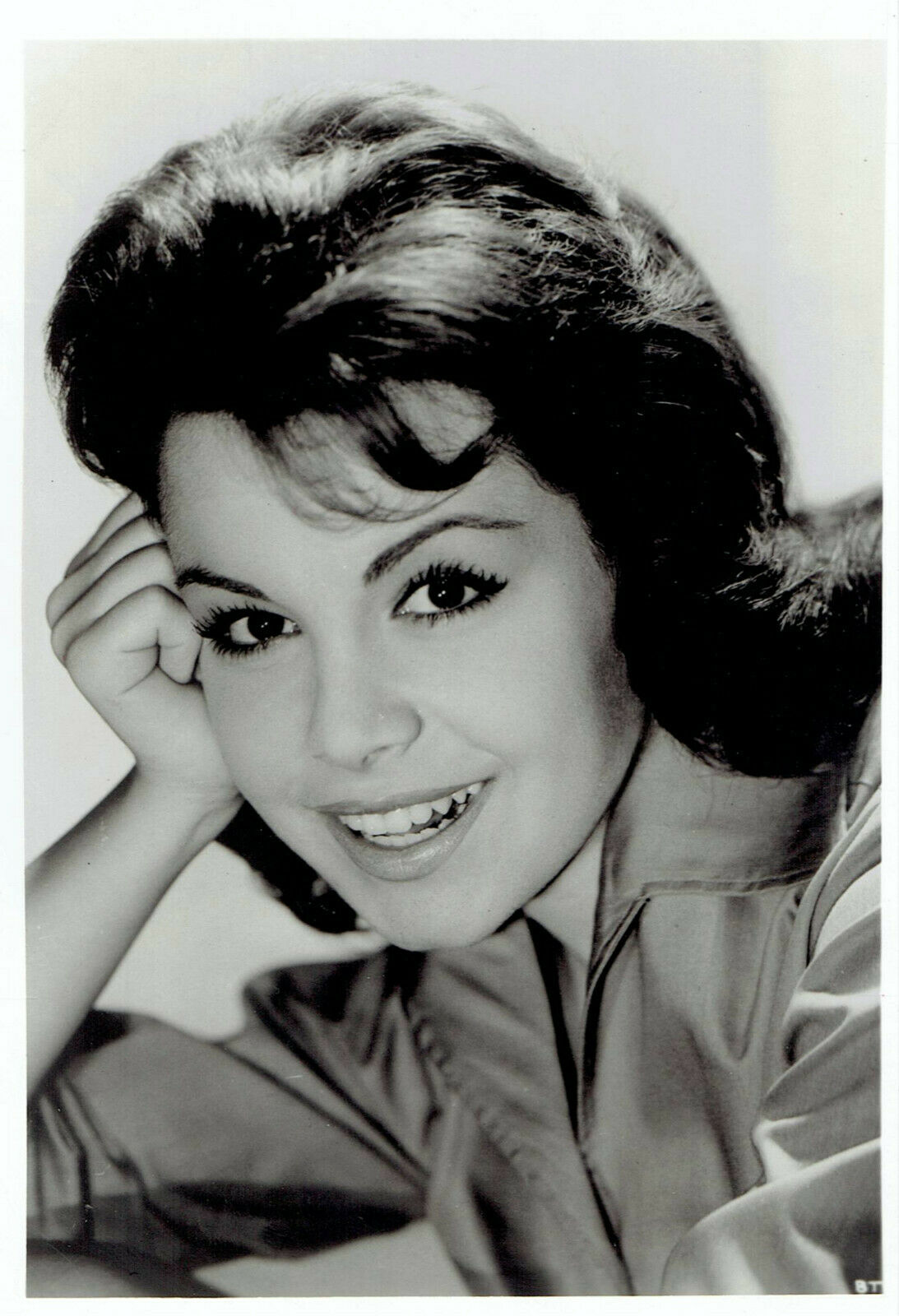
Annette Funicello

- Lester Allen – actor, dancer, acrobat
- Kim Bass – director, screenwriter, and producer
- Jef Billings – costume designer and ice show director
- Yale Boss – actor
- Steven Brill – actor, film producer, director, and screenwriter
- Adelaide Bronti – actress and operatic singer
- Victor Bumbalo – actor and playwright
- Brendan Burke – sportscaster
- Frank Cappelli – creator of Cappelli & Company
- Dick Cerri – disc jockey
- Dick Clark – television and radio personality and television producer
- Leonard Crofoot – actor, singer, dancer, writer and choreographer
- John Curran – director and screenwriter
- Natalie Dagwell – burlesque performer, dancer, and singer
- F. A. Dobson – cinematographer
- Frank Dumont – performer, sketch writer, and songwriter
- Robert Earle – game show host and voice actor
- John A. Ellsler – actor
- John Eskow – screenwriter
- Joseph Franz – director and actor
- Annette Funicello – actress and singer
- Donna Hanover – radio and television personality, television producer, and actress
- John William Isham – vaudeville impresario
- Jim Jackson – sportscaster and television and radio host
- Mary Lawlor – actress
- David Mancuso – disc jockey; creator of "The Loft"
- Jerry Mandy – actor
- Rex Marshall – actor, television announcer, and radio personality
- Ron O'Neal – actor, director, and screenwriter
- Tiffany Pollard – television personality
- Daniel Pritzker – director and musician
- Tim Roye – sportscaster and radio host
- Ralph Sheheen – sportscaster and television host
- Hal Smith – actor
- Anna Townsend – actress and frequent Harold Lloyd collaborator
- Matteo Vittucci – dancer

=== Artists and architects ===
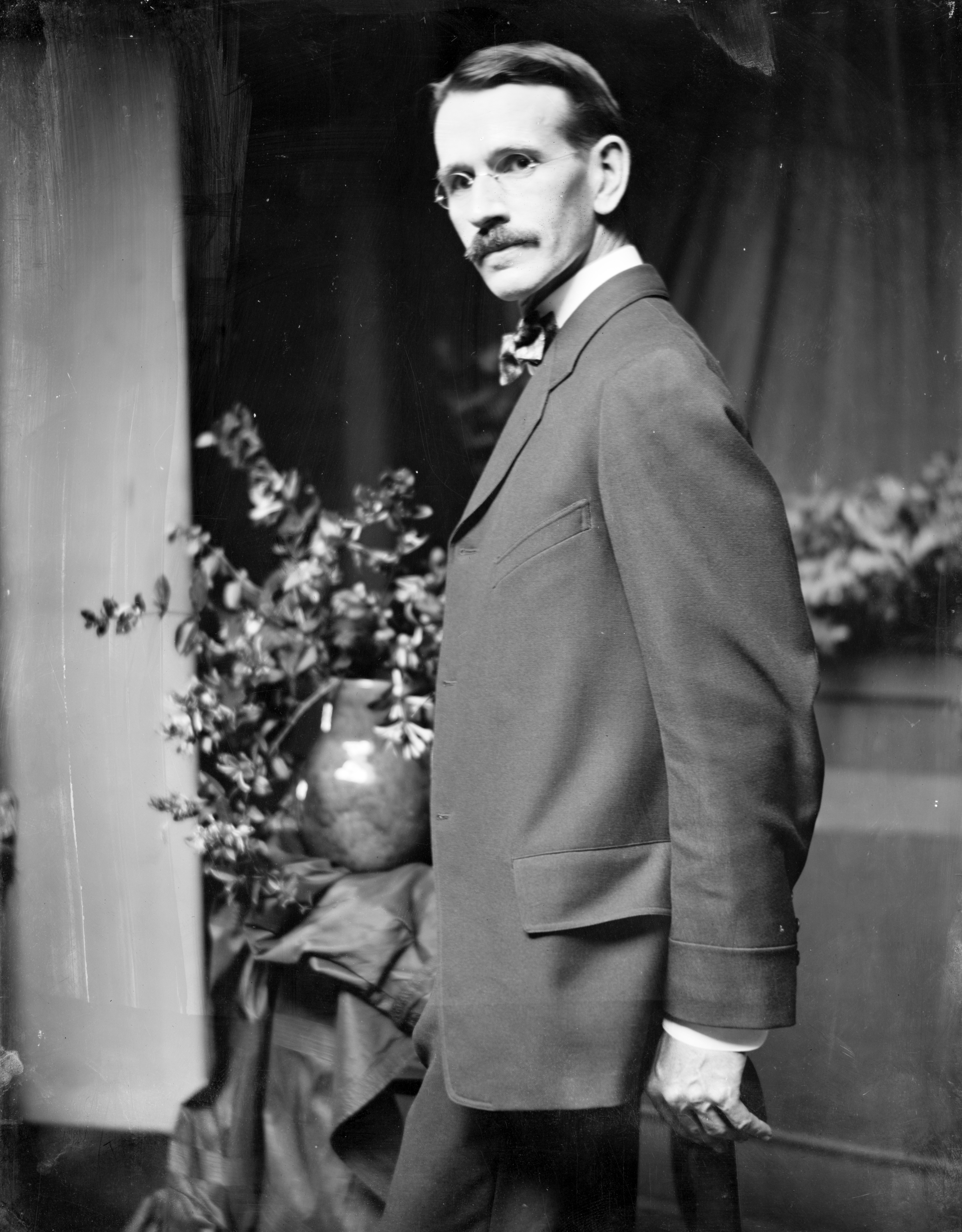
Arthur B. Davies

- Brad Anderson – cartoonist; creator of Marmaduke
- Mark Bodé – cartoonist; son of Vaughn Bodē
- Vaughn Bodē – cartoonist and illustrator
- Neave Brown – architect and artist
- Marcus F. Cummings – architect
- Arthur Bowen Davies – avant-garde artist and advocate of modern art
- Daniel DeWitt Tompkins Davie – photographer; pioneer of the daguerreotype
- Edward Brodhead Green – architect
- Absalom Barrett Hallock – architect
- Henry Inman – portrait, genre, and landscape painter
- Sheldon Keck – painting conservator
- Rose Marasco – photographer
- Daniel Nicoletta – photographer
- Maurice J. Power – sculptor
- Joe Zane – painter, sculptor, video and performance artist, and humorist

=== Athletes and athletics personnel ===
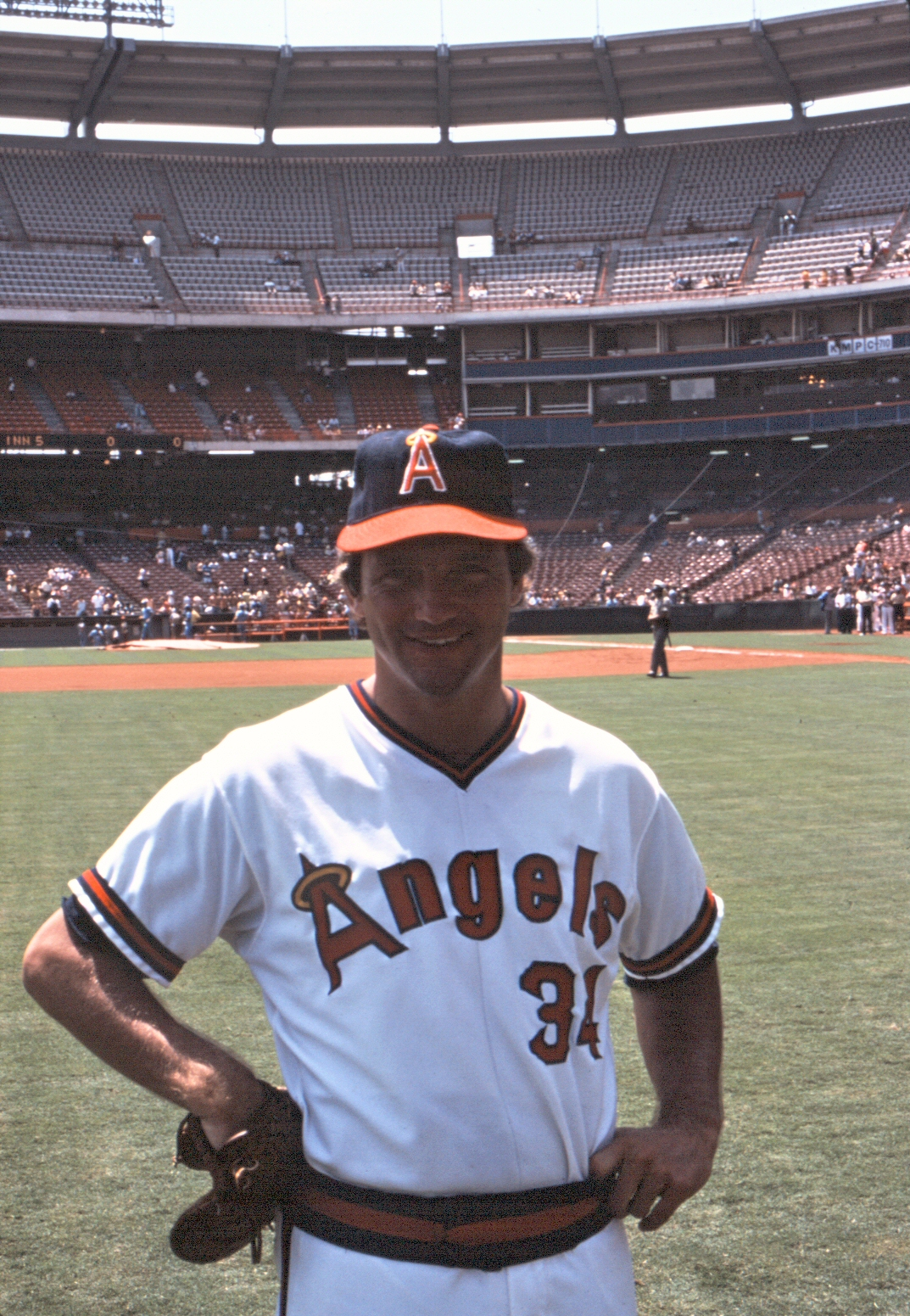
Ken Brett

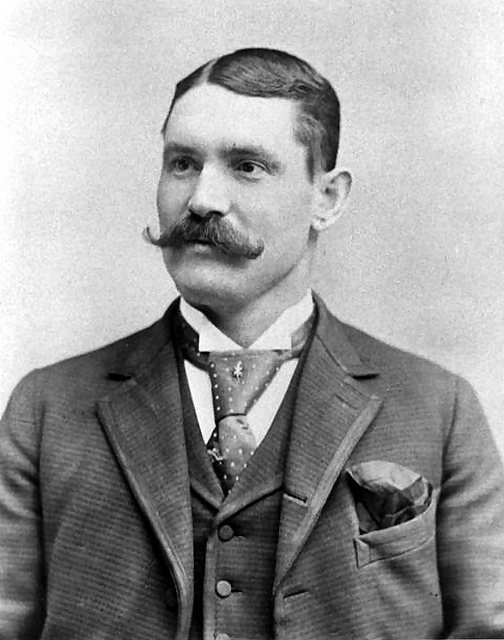
George Gore

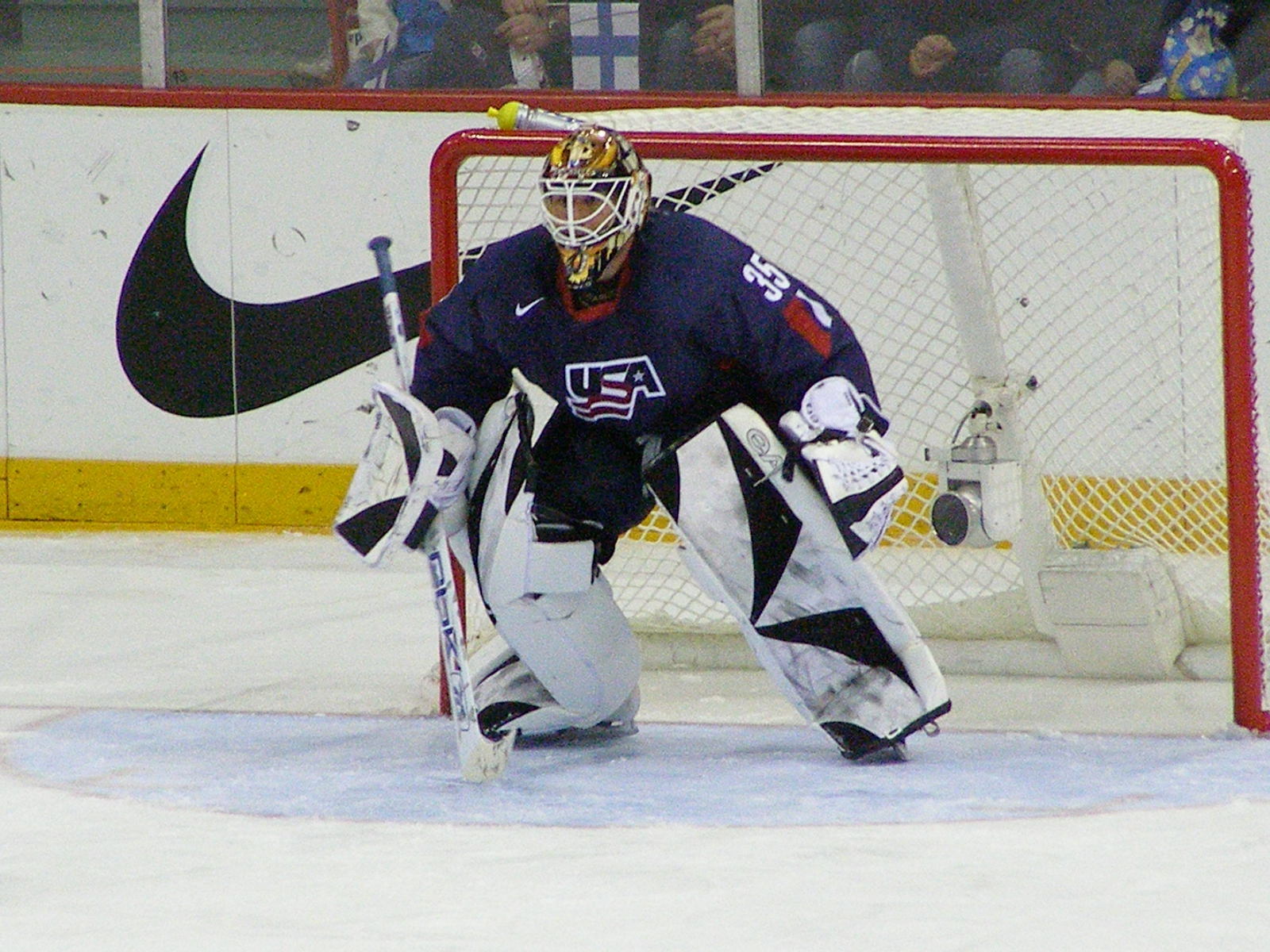
Robert Esche

- Irving Baxter – gold medalist in the men's high jump and the pole vault at the 1900 Summer Olympics
- Valentine Bialas – speed skater who competed in the 1924, 1928, and 1932 Winter Olympics
- Alonzo Breitenstein – baseball player
- Ken Brett – baseball player
- George Burns – baseball player
- Tim Capstraw – basketball coach and color commentator
- Dave Cash – baseball player
- Walt Chipple – baseball player
- Tommy Condell – Canadian football coach
- Bob Curtis – football coach
- Dominick Dawes – ice hockey coach
- George Detore – baseball player
- Bill Duggleby – baseball player
- Moira Dunn – golfer
- Louie Ehrensbeck – biathlon skier who competed in the 1968 Winter Olympics
- Robert Esche – hockey player
- Jim Fairbank – baseball player
- Gerry Friel – basketball coach
- Chris Garrett – football player
- George Gore – baseball player
- Mike Griffin – baseball player
- Jimmie Hunt – basketball player
- Ilia Jarostchuk – football player
- Ernest Jones – football player
- James Joseph – curler
- Lou Lazzaro – modified racing driver
- Mark Lemke – baseball player
- Fred Lewis – baseball player
- Joe Malcewicz – professional wrestler and promoter
- Charles B. Mason – football player and coach
- William W. May – athlete who competed in the 1908 Summer Olympics
- Dave McKeough – baseball player
- Art Mills – baseball player; coach for the 1945 World Series champion Detroit Tigers
- Willie Mills – baseball player
- Bill Morehouse – curler
- Nick Palmieri – hockey player
- Caitlin Pulli – curler
- Stacey Reile - IBF (boxing) World featherweight champion 2011
- Hardy Richardson – baseball player
- Harry Raymond – baseball player
- Len Rossi – wrestler who competed in the National Wrestling Alliance; member of the NWA Hall of Fame and the Professional Wrestling Hall of Fame
- Bernard Russ – football player
- Al Salerno – baseball umpire
- Michael Slive – commissioner of the Southeastern Conference
- Andy Van Slyke – baseball player
- Will Smith – football player
- Joseph Rockwell Swan – football player and coach
- Jim Wessinger – baseball player
- Hal White – baseball player
- George Burrell Woodin – wrestler; better known by his stage name "Mr. Wrestling"

=== Business figures ===
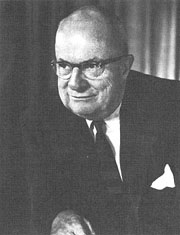
Henry J. Kaiser

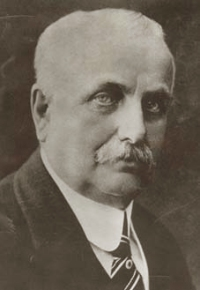
Frank Winfield Woolworth

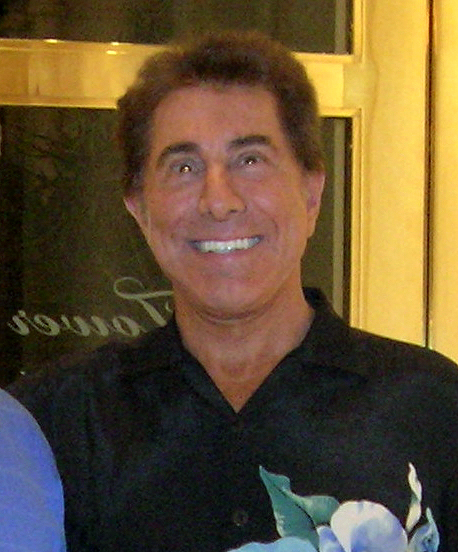
Steve Wynn

- J. Carter Bacot – president and CEO of the Bank of New York Mellon Corporation
- Richard H. Balch – vice president of the Horrocks-Ibbotson Company; co-founder of Utica University
- Harry H. Bassett – automotive executive who served as president of Buick
- Joseph H. Boardman – CEO of Amtrak and administrator of the Federal Railroad Administration
- John Butterfield – founder of American Express
- Laura Casamento – president of Utica University and president and CEO of Herkimer County Trust
- David D'Alessandro – businessman, marketing executive, and author; former CEO of John Hancock Financial and chairman for Servpro
- John C. Devereux – pioneering Irish Catholic and philanthropist; co-founder of the Savings Bank of Utica
- Nicholas Devereux – financier, banker, and philanthropist; founder of St. Bonaventure University
- Frank DuRoss – professional sports franchise owner
- Robert Fabbio – entrepreneur, technologist, and venture capitalist
- Kenny Friedkin – aviator and businessman; founder of Pacific Southwest Airlines
- Arthur Hind – textile industrialist and philatelist
- Henry J. Kaiser – industrialist; fosterer of modern American health care; founder of Kaiser Aluminum, Kaiser Steel, Kaiser Permanente, Kaiser-Frazer, Kaiser Motors, and Kaiser Broadcasting
- Joseph Mailman – businessman, investor, and philanthropist; founder of the Mailman Corporation, the Persona Blade Company, and the British Rubber Company; assisted families escaping Nazi Germany
- Alonzo C. Mather – founder and president of the Mather Stock Car Company
- Sue Mengers – talent agent
- William Henry Moore – financier; co-founder of Nabisco, Western Union the Diamond Match Company, the Delaware, Lackawanna and Western Railroad, the American Can Company, Chicago, Rock Island and Pacific Railroad, and Bankers Trust
- Theron T. Pond – businessman and pharmacist; founder of Pond's
- Andy Rubin – computer programmer, entrepreneur, and venture capitalist; founder of Android Inc.
- Arthur William Savage – inventor; founder of Savage Arms
- Richard Stark – fashion designer; co-founder of Chrome Hearts
- William Williams – printer and publisher
- Frank Winfield Woolworth – entrepreneur; founder of F. W. Woolworth Company
- Steve Wynn – real estate developer and art collector best known for his involvement in the casino and hotel industry

=== Lawyers and jurists ===
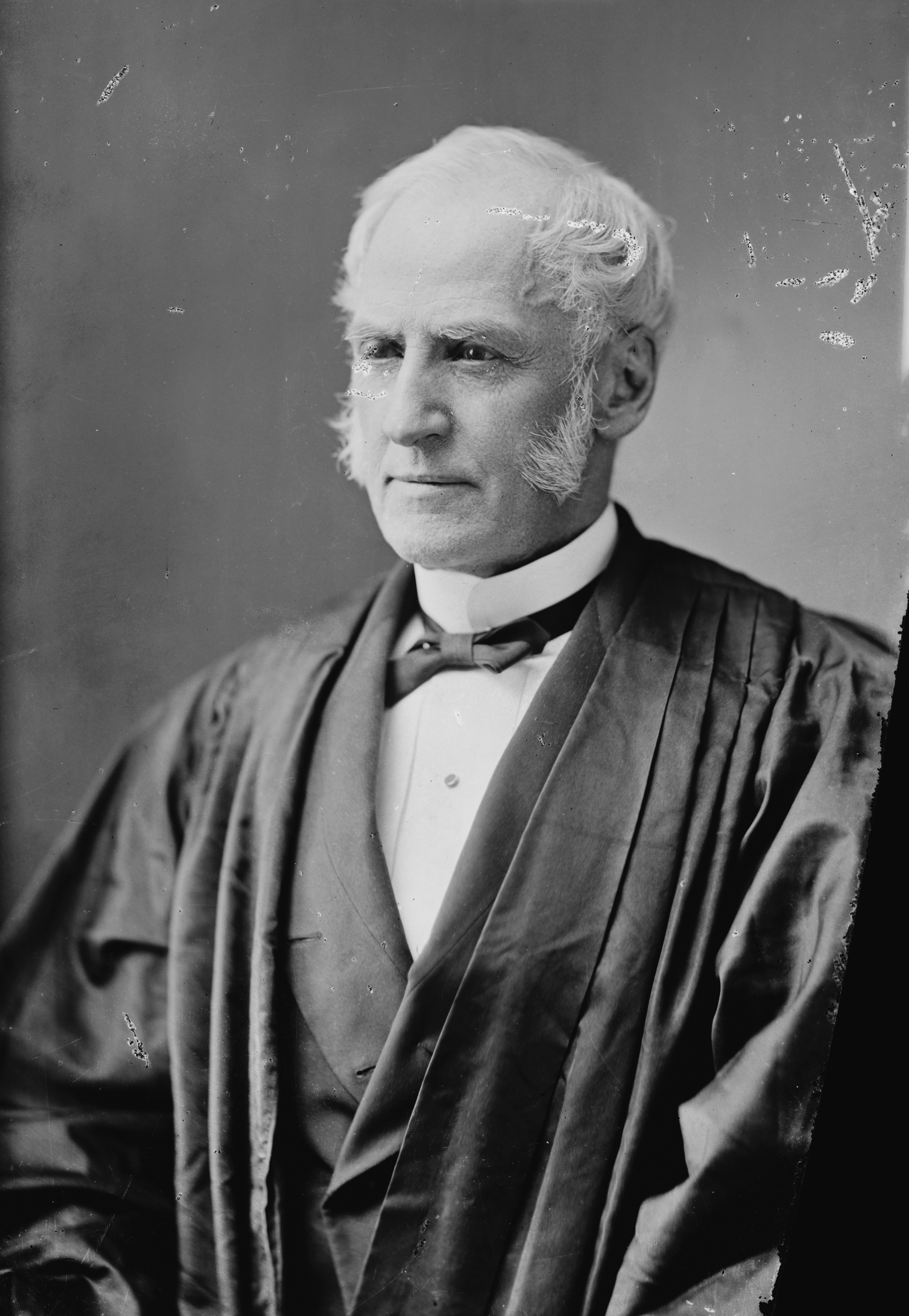
Ward Hunt

- Fritz Beebe – lawyer and chairman of the board of The Washington Post Company
- Francis Marion Burdick – legal scholar and a mayor of Utica
- Richard J. Cardamone – circuit judge of the United States Court of Appeals for the Second Circuit
- John D. Caton – chief justice of the Supreme Court of Illinois
- Ward Hunt – associate justice of the U.S. Supreme Court and Chief Judge of the New York Court of Appeals
- Lavinia Goodell – first woman licensed to practice law in Wisconsin and the first woman admitted to the Supreme Court of Wisconsin; abolitionist and women's suffrage and prison reform activist
- Alexander S. Johnson – judge
- Hugh R. Jones – served as an Associate Judge on the New York Court of Appeals
- James F. Lewis – chief justice of the Supreme Court of Nevada
- John J. Marquette – judge of the United States Tax Court
- Charles Mason – justice of the New York Supreme Court
- Louis M. Martin – justice of the New York Supreme Court
- Harry S. Patten – lawyer and politician
- Harold R. Tyler Jr. – district judge of the United States District Court for the Southern District of New York.

=== Military figures ===
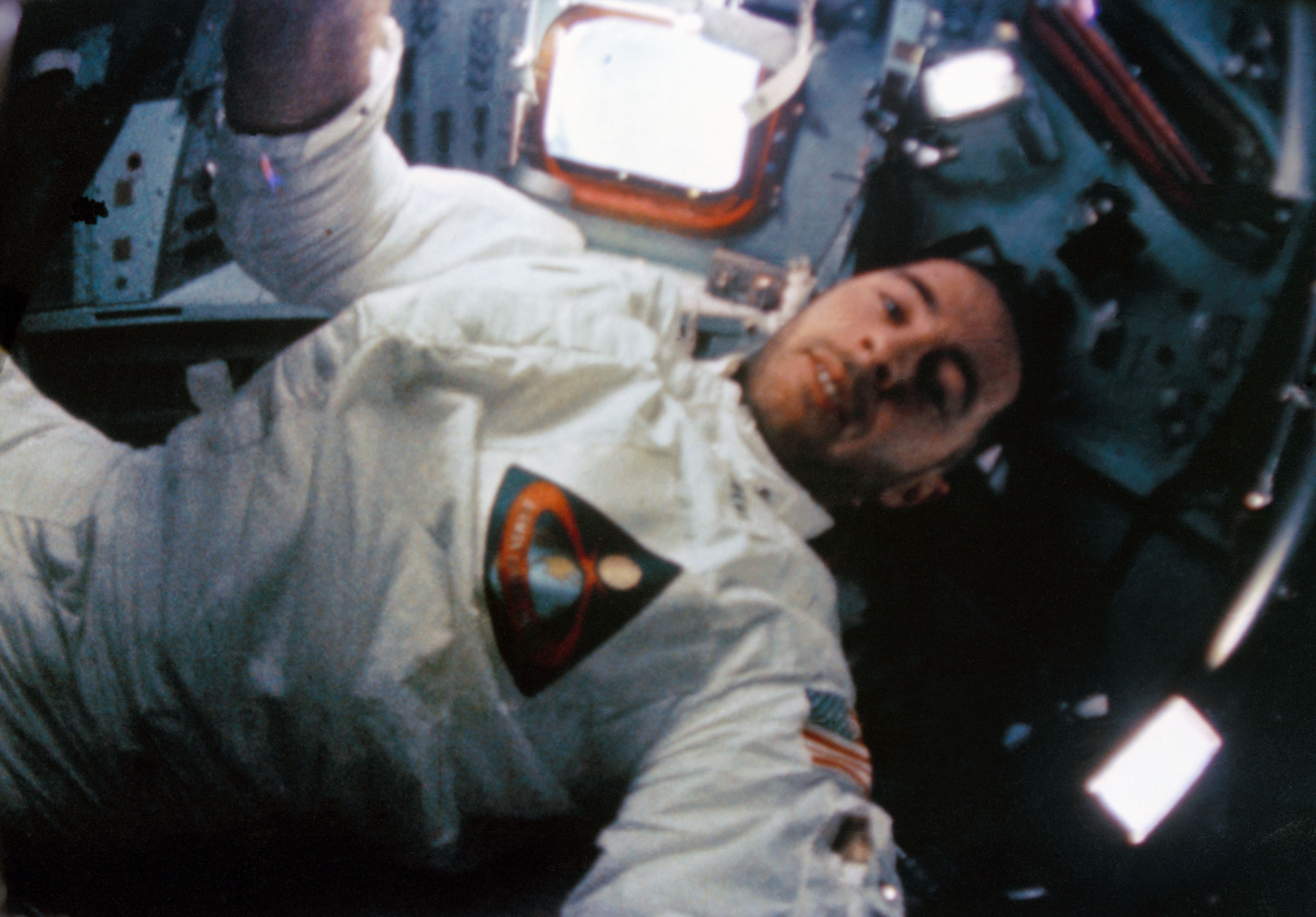
William Anders

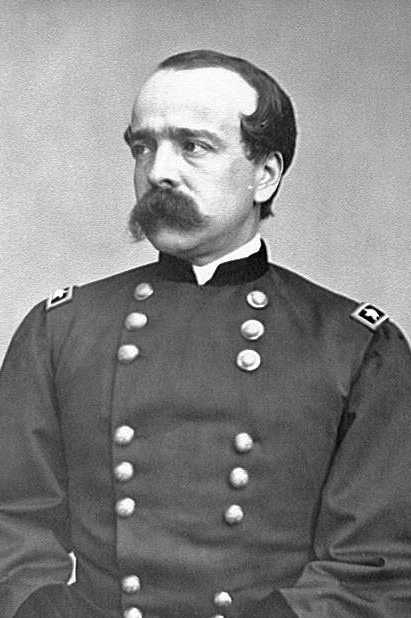
Daniel Butterfield

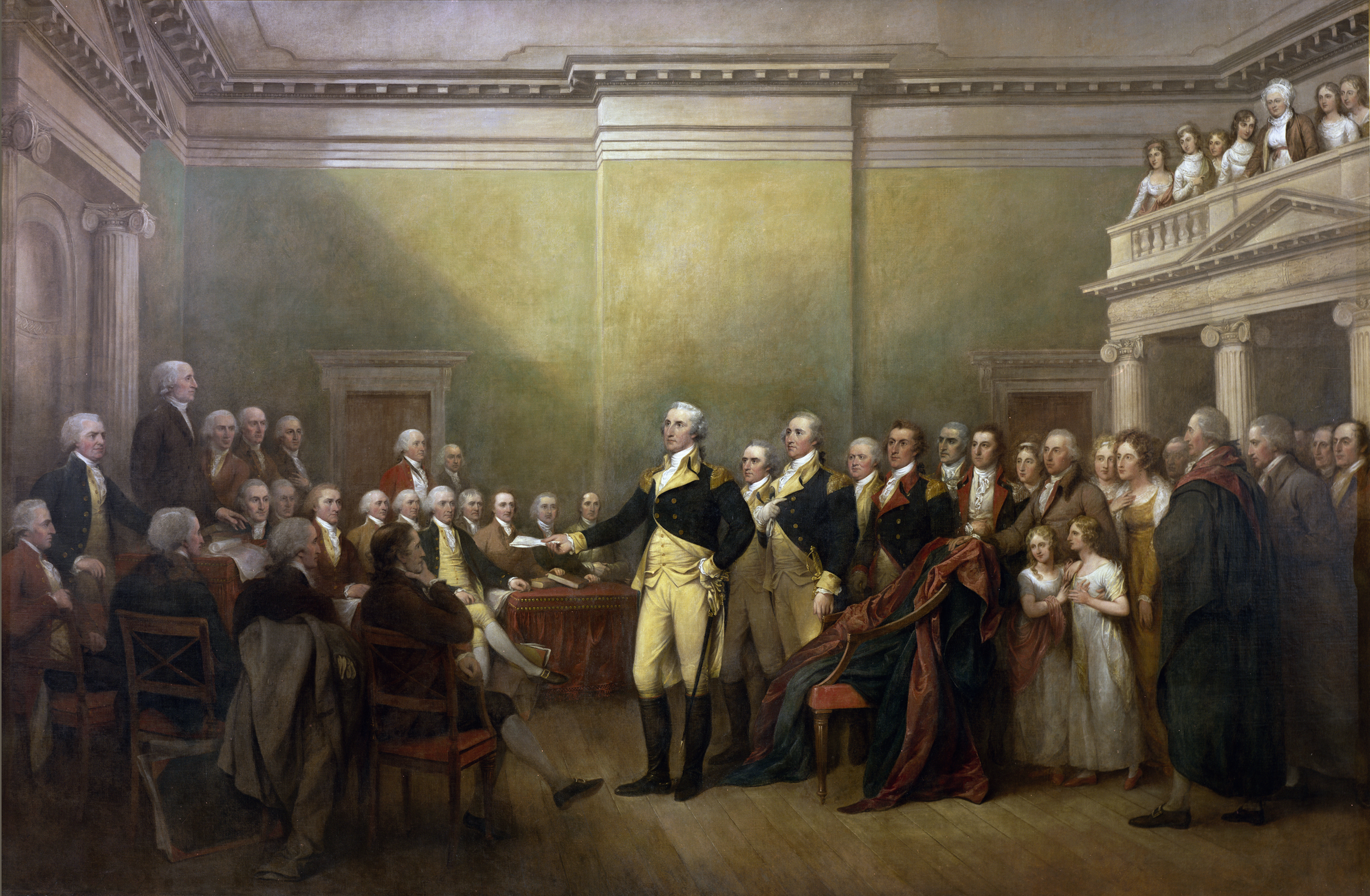
Benjamin Walker

- William Anders – Air Force major general, electrical engineer, nuclear engineer, NASA astronaut, and businessman
- Samuel Livingston Breese – Navy rear admiral
- Jacksel M. Broughton – Air Force colonel and author; retired with 43 separate awards and decorations, including four Distinguished Flying Crosses, two Silver Stars and the Air Force Cross
- Daniel Butterfield – Union army general and assistant treasurer of the United States
- Mark Divine – Navy SEAL commander
- Richard Evans – US Army brigadier general
- Ferris Foreman – Mexican-American War veteran, Union army colonel, and California 49er
- James G. Grindlay – Medal of Honor recipient and Union army brevetted brigadier general
- Earl B. Hailston – Marine Corps lieutenant general; Commanding General of United States Marine Corps Forces Pacific, U.S. Marine Forces Central Command, and U.S. Marine Corps Bases Pacific
- Edward F. Jones – Union army officer, merchant, manufacturer, author and politician
- James H. Ledlie – Union army general and civil engineer
- William Mervine – Navy rear admiral, served during the War of 1812, the Mexican–American War and the American Civil War
- James A. Mulligan – Union army colonel
- Jedediah Sanger – Continental Army first lieutenant, politician, judge, and founder of New Hartford
- Richard Henry Savage – military officer and author, potential inspiration for the pulp novel character Doc Savage
- Benjamin Walker – Continental Army officer, businessman, and politician

=== Musicians ===
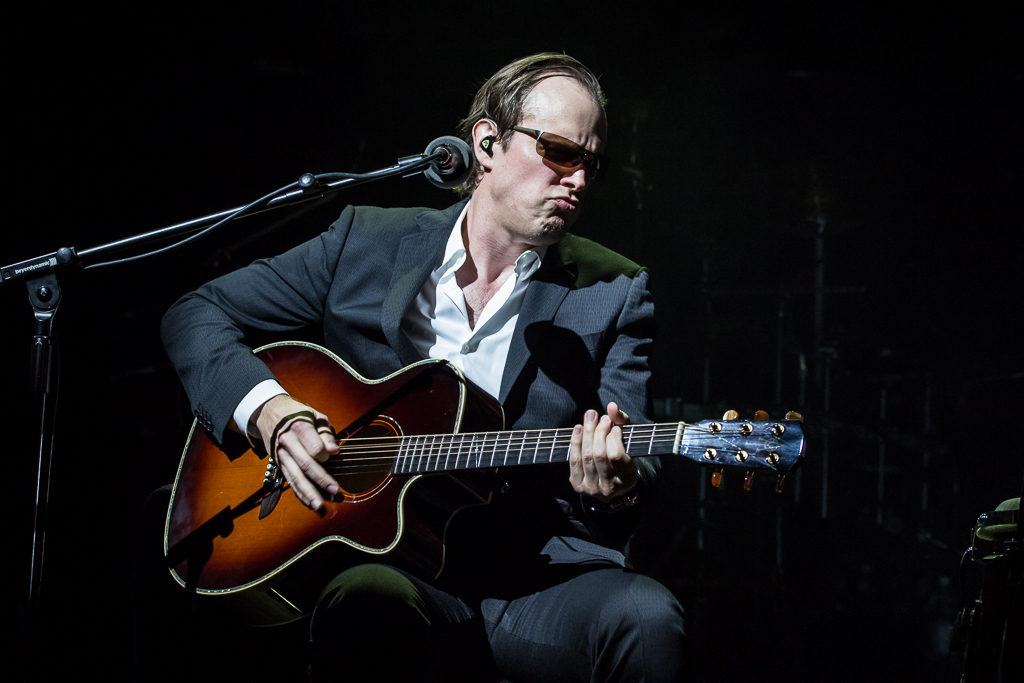
Joe Bonamassa

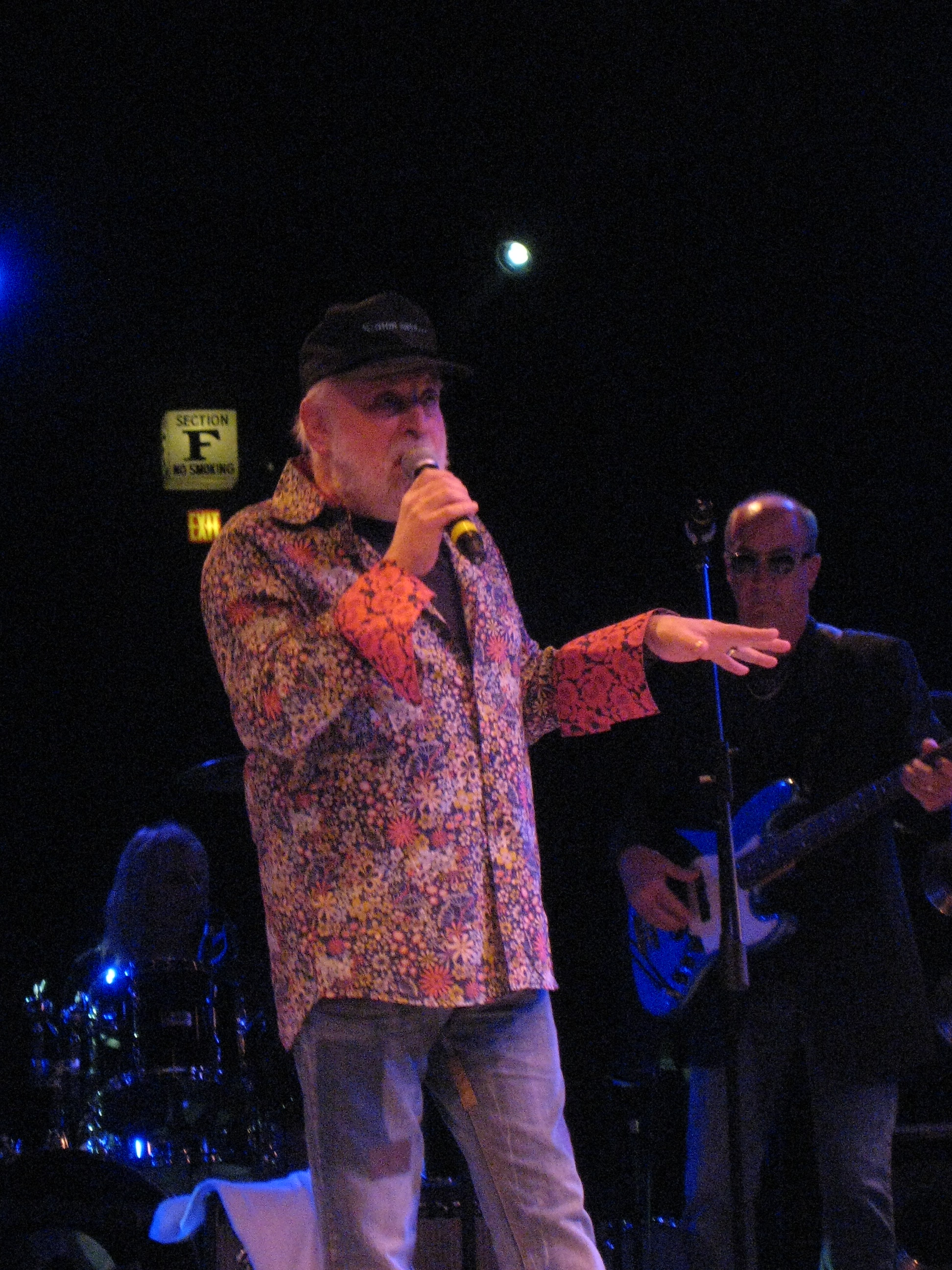
Howard Kaylan

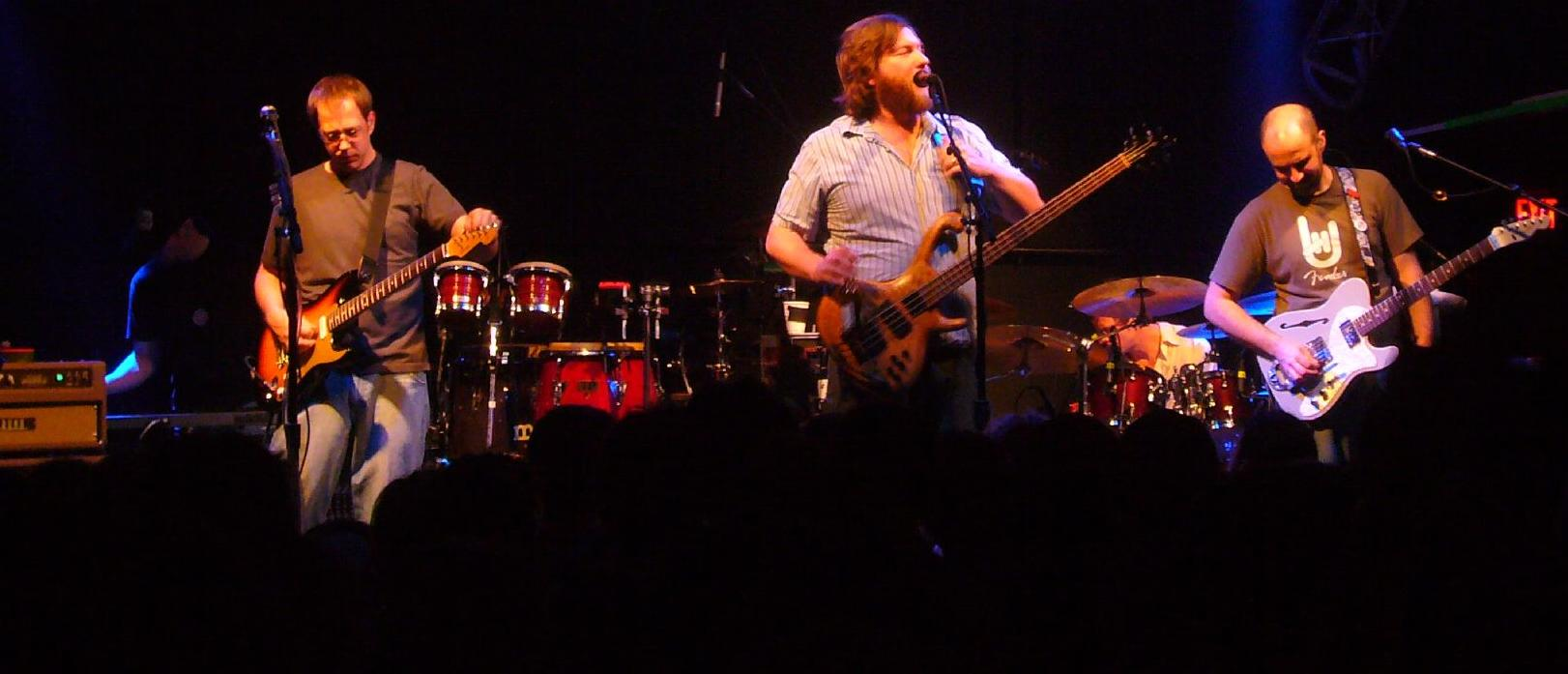
moe.

- Carlos Alexander – operatic singer
- Joe Bonamassa – blues rock guitarist, singer, and songwriter
- Bruce Burger – singer, guitarist, multi-instrumentalist, composer, and producer
- Fran Cosmo – musician best known as a former lead singer of the rock bands Boston and Orion the Hunter
- Tommy DeCarlo – singer; current lead vocalist for the rock band Boston
- Earthstar – electronic music group
- Arthur Fields – singer-songwriter
- Debbie Friedman – singer-songwriter of religious Jewish music
- Jules Herbuveaux – jazz musician and orchestra director; television executive for WMAQ-TV, the first all-color station in the world
- Lincoln Holroyd – performer, band leader, and music educator
- Angela Johnson – singer; member of Cooly's Hot Box
- Howard Kaylan – musician and songwriter; member of The Turtles, Flo & Eddie, and The Mothers of Invention
- David Eric Lowen – half of the songwriting team Lowen & Navarro
- Joseph Michael – lead singer of Sanctuary, former member of White Wizzard, Midnight Reign and Peppermint Creeps
- moe. – jam rock band
- J. R. Monterose – jazz saxophonist
- Barbara Owen – organist
- Rosetta Reitz – remastering engineer, record label owner, concert organizer, jazz historian, and activist
- B. A. Rolfe – bandleader, recording artist, radio personality, and film producer
- Sofronio Vasquez – Filipino singer; winner of season 26 of The Voice
- Jay Wanamaker – percussionist, music instructor, author, and businessman; CEO of Roland Americas and former executive at Fender, Guitar Center, Yamaha, Alfred Publishing, and chair of the Percussive Arts Society rudimental committee
- Jan Williams – percussionist, conductor, and composer
- Jimmy Wormworth – jazz drummer
- Ronnie Zito – jazz musician; drummer for Bobby Darin, Peggy Lee, and Eartha Kitt
- Torrie Zito – pianist, composer, and conductor; string arranger for John Lennon

=== Politicians ===
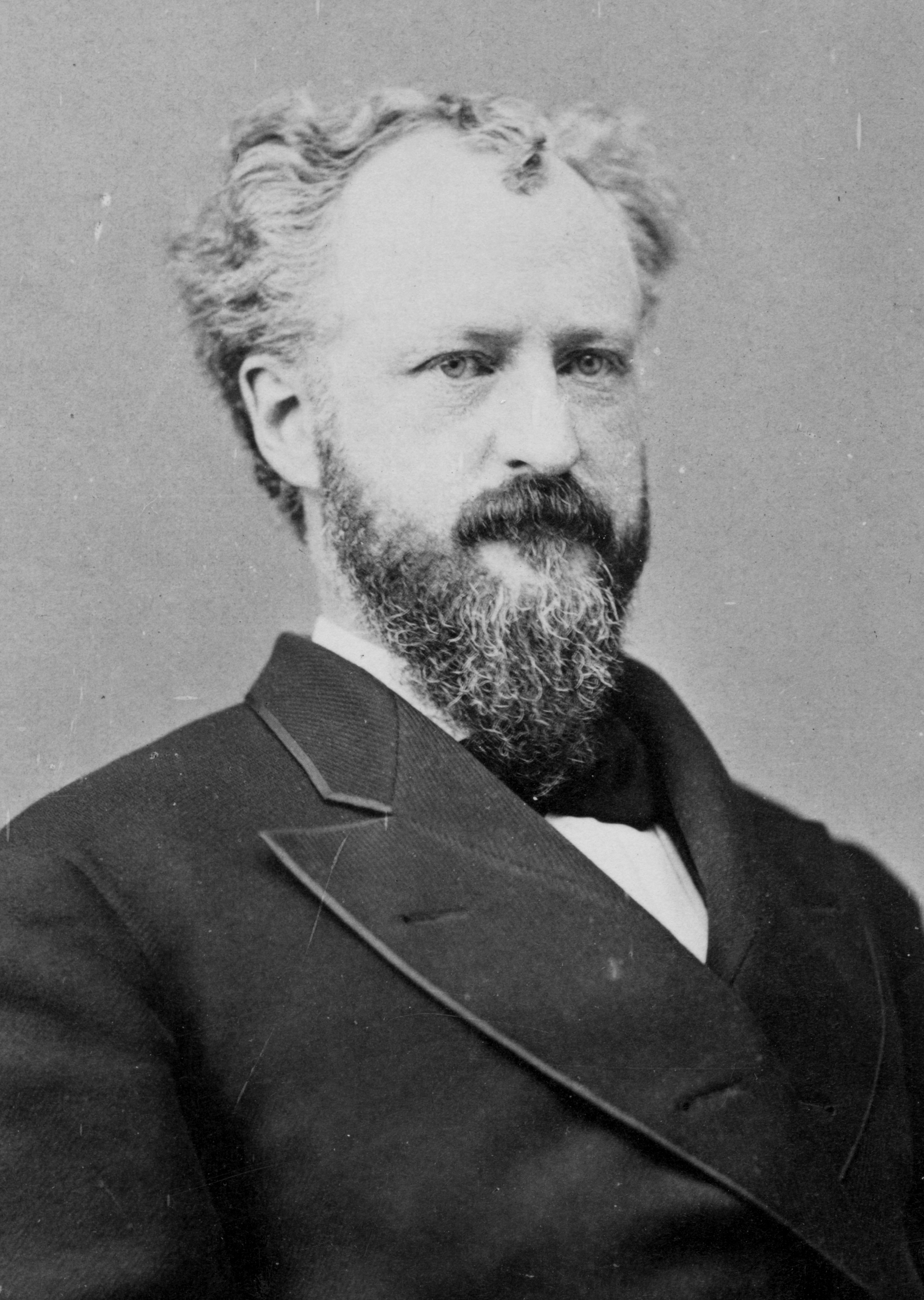
Roscoe Conkling

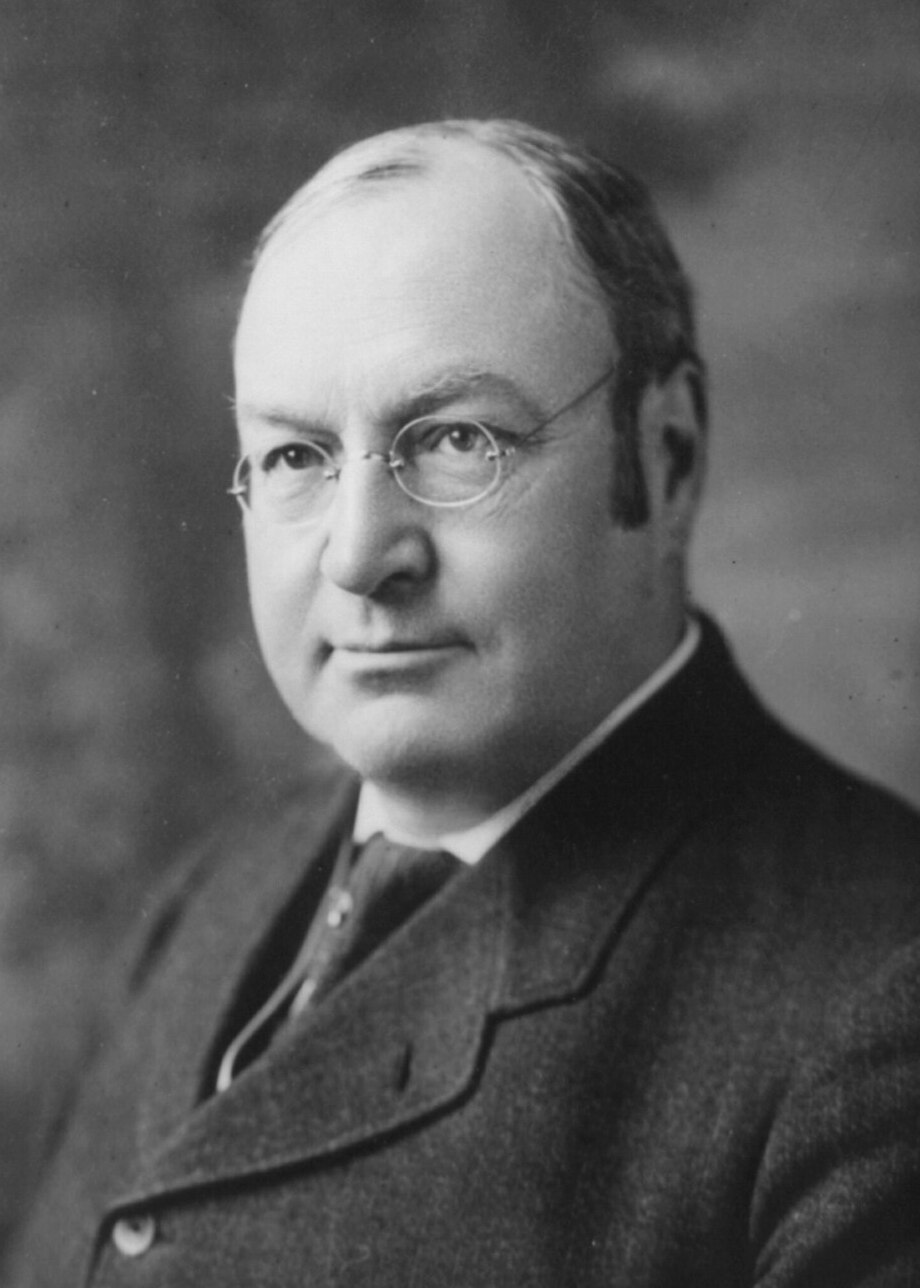
Vice President James S. Sherman

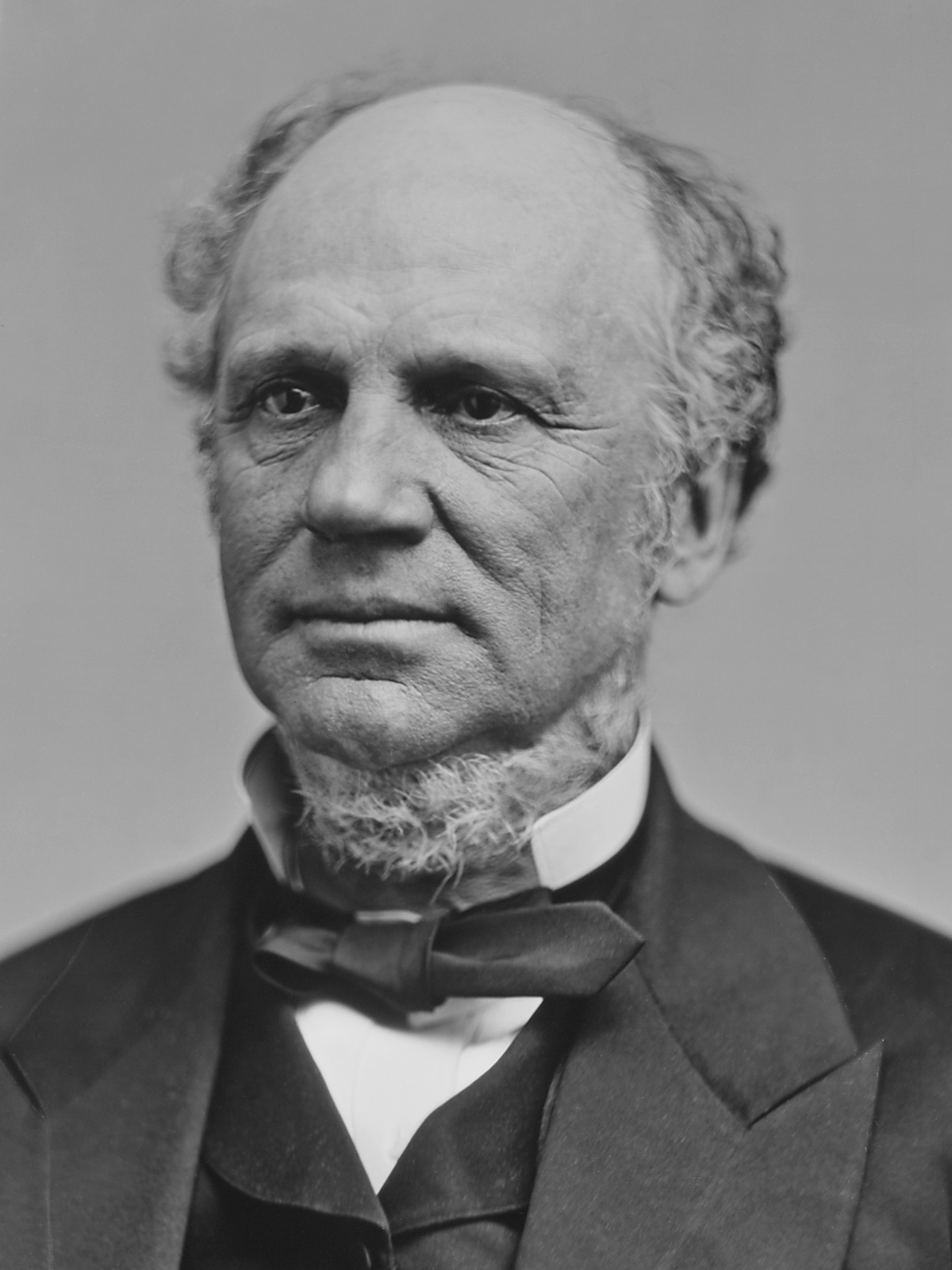
Horatio Seymour

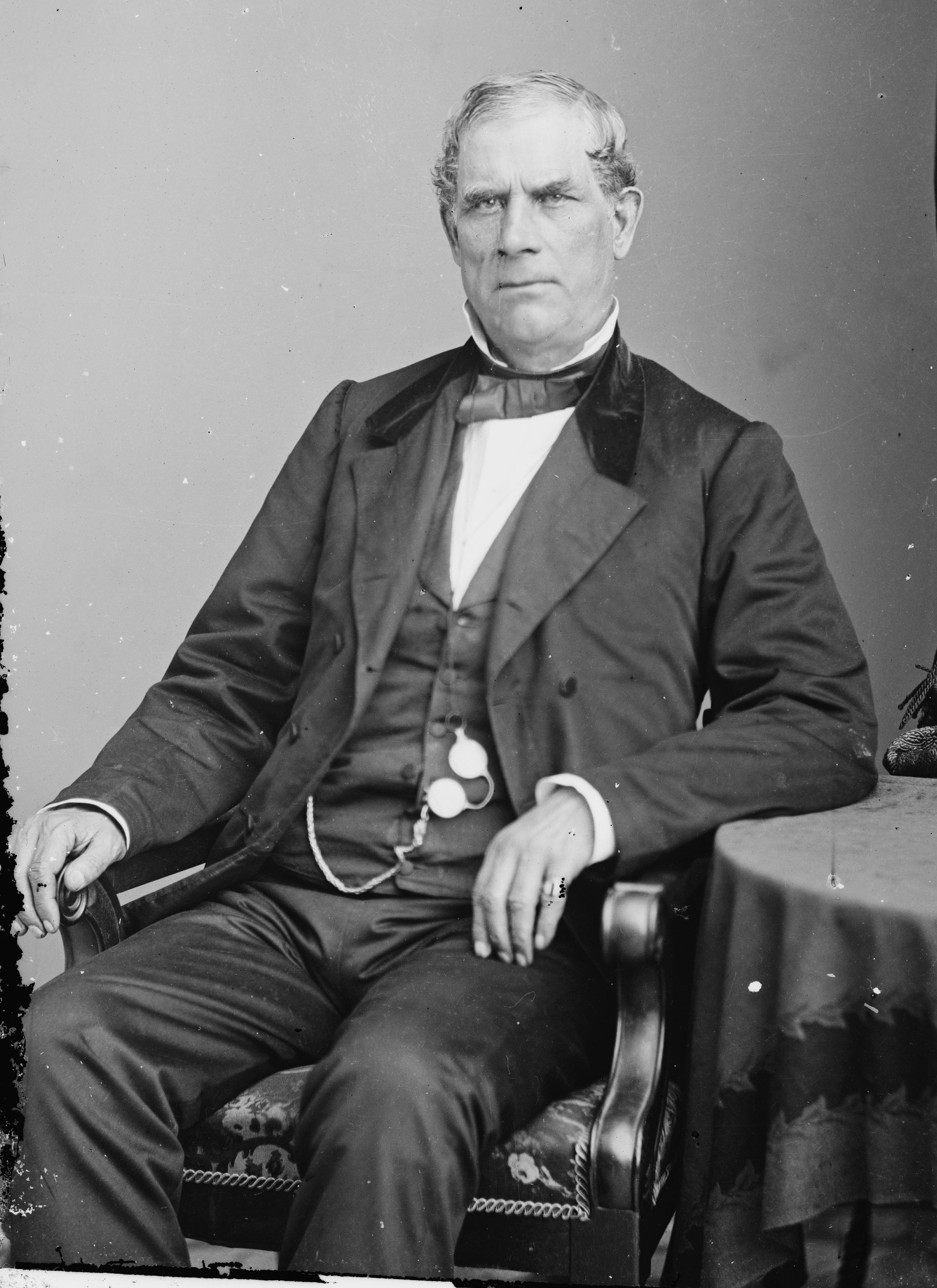
Thurlow Weed

- Joseph Ackroyd – New York state senator
- Campbell W. Adams – civil engineer, surveyor and politician; New York State Engineer and Surveyor
- Dean Alfange – politician, Greek-American activist
- Josh J. Allen – New York State Assembly member and supervisor of elections for the Eastern District of New York
- Mike Arcuri – U.S. congressman
- William J. Bacon – U.S. congressman
- Wesley Bailey – politician and newspaper editor
- William Baker – speaker of the New York State Assembly and Erie Canal commissioner
- St. Andre Durand Balcombe – Minnesota legislator, Indian agent, and newspaper editor
- Samuel Beardsley – U.S. congressman
- Flavel W. Bingham – mayor of Cleveland
- Sherwood Boehlert – U.S. congressman
- Alvan E. Bovay – Wisconsin State Assembly representative; one of the founders of the Republican Party
- M. William Bray – lieutenant governor of New York
- Anthony Brindisi – U.S. congressman
- William S. Calli – New York State Assembly member and New York state senator
- John T. Clark – civil engineer and politician
- Alfred Conkling – U.S. congressman, United States district judge of the United States District Court for the Northern District of New York, and United States Minister to Mexico
- Roscoe Conkling – U.S. congressman
- Charles Cook – New York state senator
- Simon Newton Dexter – politician and merchant
- John W. Dorrington – Arizona Territorial Legislature representative and newspaper owner, editor and publisher
- Fred J. Douglas – U.S. congressman
- Russell G. Dunmore – New York State Assembly member
- Rufus Elefante – Democratic political boss
- De Witt C. Flanagan – U.S. congressman
- William Jay Gaynor – mayor of New York City and political reformer
- Jonas Platt Goodsell – New York State Engineer and Surveyor
- Alexander T. Goodwin – New York state senator
- Charles P. Graham – Adjutant General of the State of Connecticut
- John K. Hackett – Recorder of New York City
- William H. Hampton – New York state senator
- Richard Hanna – U.S. congressman
- Carol Hanson – mayor of Boca Raton, Florida
- Thomas H. Hubbard – U.S. congressman
- Thomas Lemuel James – United States Postmaster General, journalist, and banker
- Francis Kernan – U.S. congressman
- Michael J. Kernan – New York State Assembly member and New York state senator
- Joseph Kirkland – U.S. congressman
- Orsamus Benajah Matteson – U.S. congressman
- John T. McKennan – New York State Assembly member
- Henry Merrill – Wisconsin state senator, pioneer, and merchant
- Victor H. Metcalf – Secretary of Commerce and Labor and Secretary of the Navy under Theodore Rosevelt
- Brian Miller – New York State Assembly member
- Morris S. Miller – U.S. congressman
- Rutger B. Miller – U.S. congressman
- Joe Morelle – U.S. congressman
- Charles E. Morris – Wisconsin State Assembly representative
- Cyrus D. Prescott – U.S. congressman
- Alexander Pirnie – U.S. congressman
- William H. Ray – U.S. congressman
- John A. Roche – mayor of Chicago
- Theodore S. Sayre – New York state senator and businessman
- William R. Sears – New York State Assembly member and New York state senator
- Henry Seymour – politician, merchant, banker
- Horatio Seymour – politician who served as New York State governor
- James R. Sheffield – New York State Assembly member and Ambassador to Mexico
- Walter Sheridan – FBI investigator and author
- Carrie Babcock Sherman – wife of Vice President James S. Sherman, second lady of the United States
- James Schoolcraft Sherman – lawyer and politician who served as 27th vice president of the United States
- Fred Sisson – U.S. congressman
- John T. Spriggs – U.S. congressman
- Henry R. Storrs – U.S. congressman
- Charles A. Talcott – U.S. congressman
- Enoch B. Talcott – New York state senator
- William B. Taylor – civil engineer and politician; New York State Engineer and Surveyor
- William Townsend – New York State Assembly member and New York state senator
- Thurlow Weed – principal advisor to William H. Seward
- Benjamin Welch – New York State Treasurer
- Chandler J. Wells – prominent builder who served as mayor of Buffalo, New York
- Philo White – Wisconsin state senator
- John Williams – U.S. congressman
- James Zogby – founder of the Arab American Institute

=== Religion and philosophy ===
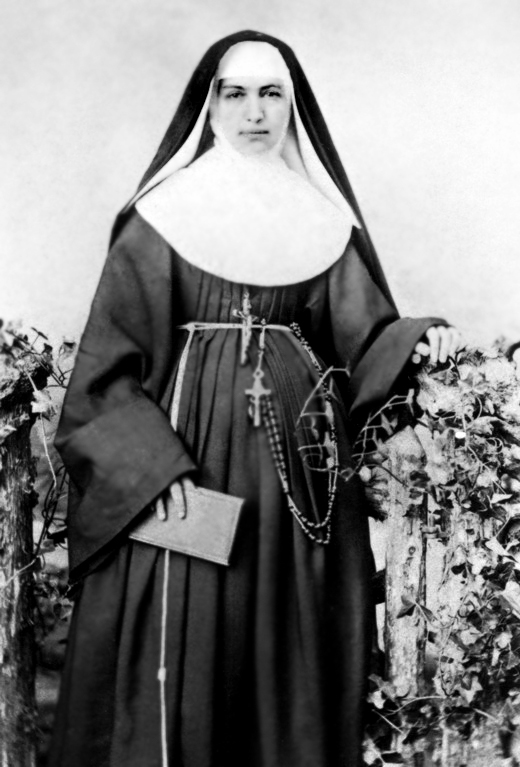
Saint Marianne Cope

- Leopoldina Burns – religious sister; close companion and biographer of Marianne Cope during the 1883 Hansen’s Disease epidemic on the island of Moloka’i, Hawaii
- Marianne Cope – religious sister and Roman Catholic saint
- George Washington Gale – minister, founder of the Oneida Institute of Science and Industry
- Asa Jennings – pastor who organized the evacuation of 350,000 Christian refugees from the shores of Smyrna
- Alexander Bryan Johnson – philosopher and semanticist; married to the granddaughter of President John Adams
- George Heber Jones – missionary in Korea
- Samuel Kirkland Lothrop – clergyman and writer
- Isaac Norton Rendall – Presbyterian minister and president of Lincoln University
- John Timothy Stone – clergyman
- Granville M. Williams – priest, monk, and writer

=== Social reformers ===
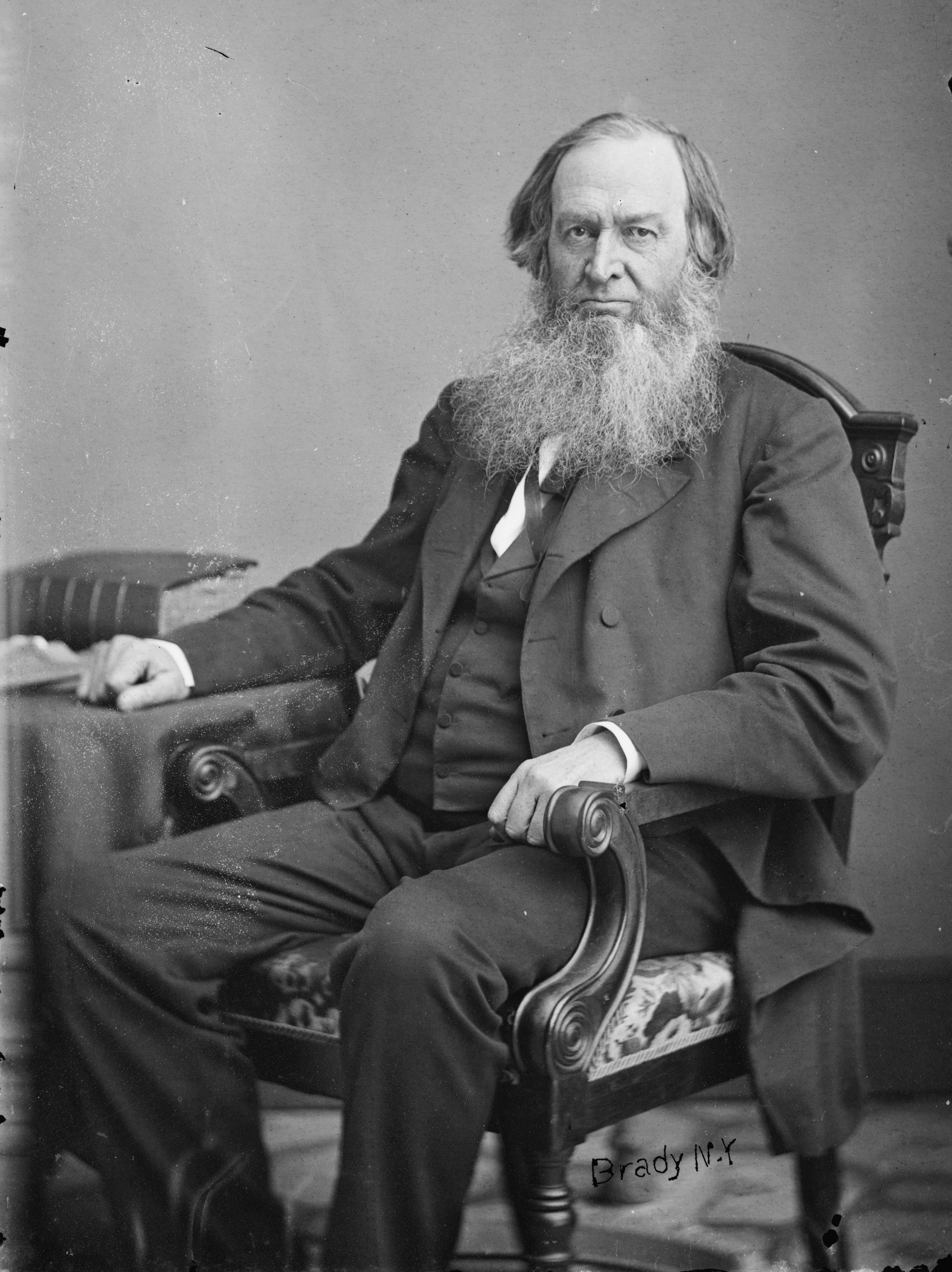
Gerrit Smith

- Ralph Beaumont – labor union leader
- George Alder Blumer – physician, mental hospital administrator, and journal editor; major leader and reformer in the provision of humanitarian care for mental hospital patients
- Jane Louisa Hardy – activist and philanthropist
- Jermain Wesley Loguen – abolitionist, bishop, teacher, and author
- Anna Rice Powell – abolitionist and women's suffrage activist
- Gerrit Smith – social reformer, abolitionist, businessman, public intellectual, and philanthropist
- Charles Stuart – Bermudian-born abolitionist and military officer
- Theodore Dwight Weld – early architect of the abolitionist movement

=== Writers and journalists ===
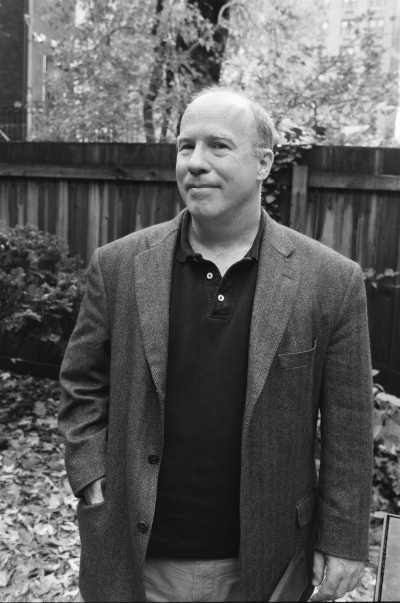
Mark Danner

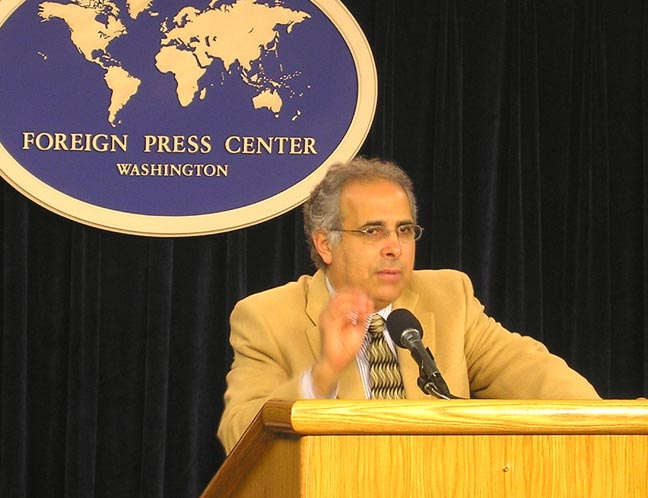
John Zogby

- Mary C. Ames – novelist, poet, and journalist
- Daniel Barwick – writer, fundraiser, journalist, podcaster, higher education administrator, and teacher
- Allan Beekman – writer and reporter
- Richard Benedetto – political reporter and columnist
- Eric Boehlert – journalist, writer, and media critic
- Ray Bremser – poet
- Dan Cameron – writer and contemporary art curator
- Daryl Cobb – author of children's books
- Jane Elizabeth Conklin – poet and religious writer
- Pádraig Phiarais Cúndún – Irish-American homesteader and composer of American poetry in the Irish language
- John Elliott Curran – novelist
- Mark Danner – writer, journalist, and educator
- Georgia Roberts Durston – novelist and poet
- David Skaats Foster – novelist
- Harold Frederic – journalist and novelist
- Charles E. Fritch – fantasy, science fiction, horror, and mystery novelist
- Joanne Grant – journalist and activist
- Michael Kernan – writer and Washington Post journalist
- Alen Pol Kobryn – novelist, poet, and voice actor
- John D. MacDonald – writer and best-selling crime novelist
- Tom McGinty – investigative journalist; Pulitzer Prize winner
- HP Newquist – writer, museum founder and curator, and musician
- Ryan Nobles – journalist
- Grace May North – newspaper journalist and author of novels for children and adolescents
- Charles Quinn – journalist and NBC News reporter
- Jeff Rossen –television journalist
- Dan Senor – columnist, writer, and political advisor to Mitt Romney
- John Randolph Spears – author and journalist
- John Zogby – political pollster, author, and public speaker; founder of the Zogby poll and the Zogby International poll

=== Other ===
- Bianca Devins – teenager who was murdered by a male acquaintance
- Edward P. Felt – passenger on United Flight 93
- Lewis Lawrence – founder of Eatonville, Florida, the oldest incorporated Black town in the U.S.
- John Thomas Moss – frontiersman, prospector, and miner
- Nyah Mway – teenager who was killed by an officer of the Utica Police Department
- Samuel Manning Todd – founding member of the Mistick Krewe of Comus, the oldest extant New Orleans, Louisiana Carnival Krewe
- Michael Zarnock – Hot Wheels collector and two-time Guinness World Record holder

=== Fictional characters ===
- Bobbi Anderson – protagonist of the Stephen King novel The Tommyknockers
- Gary Chalmers – superintendent of Springfield School District on the animated sitcom The Simpsons
- Clean – protagonist of the 2021 film of the same name
- Karen Filippelli – regional manager of the Utica branch of Dunder Mifflin on the mockumentary sitcom The Office
- Uncle Leo – Alice Kramden's uncle on The Honeymooners

== From Greater Utica ==
=== Academics and scientists ===
- Waleed Abdalati – former NASA Chief Scientist; director of the Cooperative Institute for Research in Environmental Sciences at the University of Colorado Boulder
- Charles Henry Smyth Jr. – geologist
- Maria Van Kerkhove – infectious disease epidemiologist; technical lead of the COVID-19 response and the head of the diseases and zoonosis unit at the World Health Organization

=== Actors and entertainers ===
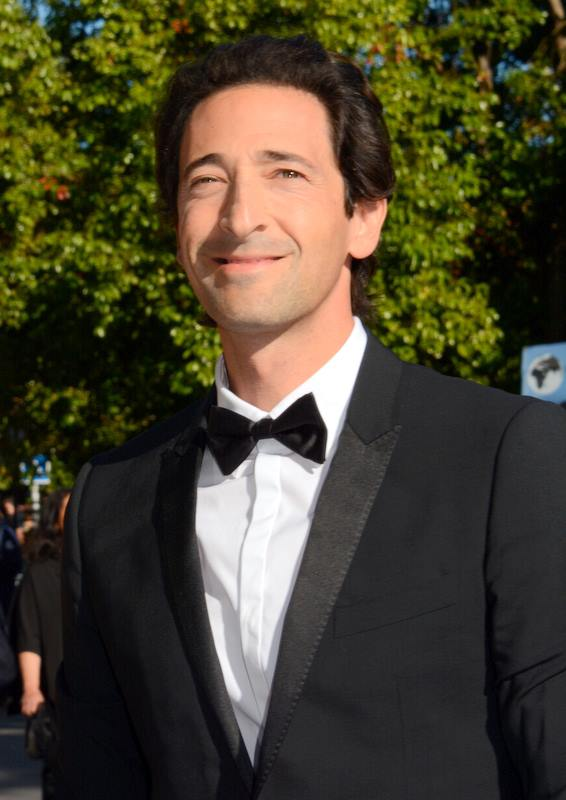
Adrien Brody

- Susan Bennett – voice actress and singer; provided the original voice of Apple's Siri personal assistant, sang backup for Roy Orbison and Burt Bacharach
- Adrien Brody – actor
- John Frink – writer and executive producer for The Simpsons
- Joel de la Fuente – actor

=== Artists and architects ===
- Calvert Coggeshall – painter
- Rufus J. Dryer – painter

=== Athletes and athletics personnel ===
- Derek Bard – golfer
- Chuck Detwiler – football player
- Joe Nolan – hockey player
- Johnny Sullivan – boxer; competed in the 1948 Summer Olympics
- Mike Zalewski – hockey player
- Steven Zalewski – hockey player

=== Business figures ===
- William McLaren Bristol – co-founder of Bristol-Meyers Squibb
- William John Murphy – contractor and land developer; founder of Glendale, Arizona
- John Ripley Myers – co-founder of Bristol-Meyers Squibb
- H.M. Quackenbush – inventor and industrialist

=== Lawyers and jurists ===
- Jasper W. Gilbert – justice of the New York Supreme Court

=== Military figures ===
Nicholas Herkimer

- Frank O. Fournia – Medal of Honor recipient
- Nicholas Herkimer – military officer; fought during the French and Indian War and Revolutionary War
- Henry Palmer – Union army surgeon

=== Musicians ===
- Roberta Guaspari – violinist
- Mat Marucci – jazz drummer

=== Politicians ===
- Alexander L. Collins – Whig party leader; first governor of Wisconsin
- Frederick S. Martin – U.S. congressman
- Roswell B. Mason – mayor of Chicago during the Great Chicago Fire
- James Wilson Seaton – Wisconsin State senator, pioneer, and lawyer
- Francis E. Spinner – treasurer of the United States
- Mancel Talcott – Chicago politician

=== Religion and philosophy ===
- Francis Bellamy – Christian socialist Baptist minister and author; author of the Pledge of Allegiance
- Hiram Huntington Kellogg Sr. – Presbyterian minister; founder and first director of the Female Seminary in Clinton, New York and the first president of Knox College

=== Social reformers ===
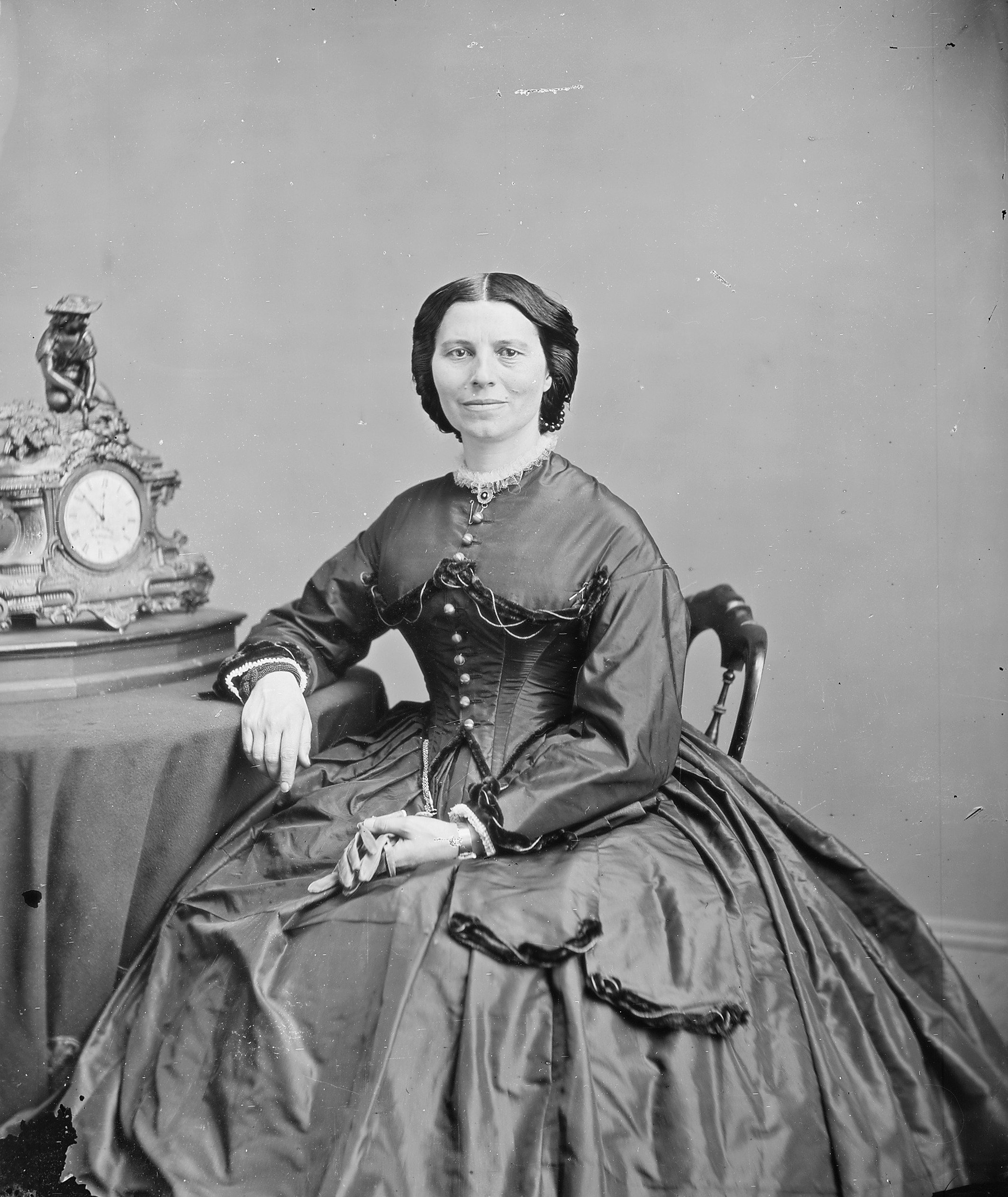
Clara Barton

- Clara Barton – founder of the American Red Cross

=== Writers and journalists ===
- Natalie Babbitt – children's author
- Samuel Bellamy Beach – author and publisher
- Grace Lin – children's author
- Harold Bell Wright – author

=== Other ===
- Benjamin Wright – chief engineer of the Erie Canal

== See also ==
- Category:Utica University people
- List of people from Rome, New York
