= List of people from Rome, New York =

This article lists notable people from Rome, New York.

== List ==
- Ben Baldanza, CEO of Spirit Airlines 2006–2016
- Albert Barnes, theologian
- Samuel Beardsley, (1790–1860), attorney, judge, and legislator
- Francis Bellamy, author of the Pledge of Allegiance
- Wilson S. Bissell (1847–1903), U.S. Postmaster General (1893-1895)
- Joseph H. Boardman (1948–2019), CEO of Amtrak 2008–2016
- Oscar Burkard, Medal of Honor recipient
- Asa S. Bushnell, politician
- Walter R. Brooks, author of the Freddy the Pig children's book series
- George Butts, civil war soldier
- Archi Cianfrocco, Major League Baseball player
- Jerry Cook, NASCAR driver, six-time NASCAR Modified Champion and one of NASCAR's 50 Greatest Drivers
- The DeMarco Sisters, singers
- Chuck Detwiler, football player
- Mary Easton Sibley, educator
- Richie Evans, NASCAR driver, nine-time NASCAR Modified Champion, one of NASCAR's 50 Greatest Drivers, 2012 NASCAR Hall Of Fame inductee
- Welthy Honsinger Fisher, literacy advocate
- Henry A. Foster, U.S. Representative and Senator from New York, Justice of the New York Supreme Court
- Frank O. Fournia, Medal of Honor recipient
- Jasper W. Gilbert (1812–1899), justice of the New York Supreme Court
- Roberta Guaspari, violinist, educator, and feminist
- Alex Haley (1921–1992), author of Roots: The Saga of an American Family, 1963–1968
- Mark Hapka, actor, Days Of Our Lives
- Benjamin Huntington, politician
- Benjamin N. Huntington, politician
- John B. Jervis, leading U.S. civil engineer of early 19th century, designer of Croton Aqueduct, High Bridge of New York City, and 4-2-0 railroad locomotive
- Norman B. Judd (1815–1878), U.S. Congressman
- Charles H. Larrabee (1820–1883), U.S. Representative from Wisconsin
- Bill Macatee, sportscaster
- Francis A. Mallison, journalist
- Robert Manfred, Commissioner of Major League Baseball
- Mat Marucci, jazz drummer
- Silas Matteson, politician
- Tom Myslinski, NFL player
- Robert Park, college football coach
- Spencer Parrish, R&B, jazz, and gospel songwriter
- James Joseph Plunkett (1900–1946), architect, known for his work in Santa Barbara, California
- Benjamin Wright Raymond, mayor of Chicago
- Pat Riley, former NBA player and head coach; currently the President of the Miami Heat
- Tim Russ, actor, Star Trek: Voyager
- Scott Salvator, interior designer
- Tim Sestito, National Hockey League player
- Tom Sestito, National Hockey League player
- Richard D. Simons, Associate Justice, New York State Court of Appeals, 1983–1997
- John Sonsini, artist
- Mancel Talcott, Chicago politician
- Bonnie Thunders, roller derby skater
- Mary Edwards Walker (1832–1919), feminist, abolitionist, prohibitionist, alleged spy, prisoner of war, surgeon, and, as of 2016, only woman to receive the Medal of Honor
- Daniel Wardwell, lawyer, jurist, and politician
- Anthony Washington, discus world champion (1999), four-time national champion, three-time Olympian: 1992, 1996, 2000
- Benjamin Wright (1770–1842), Chief Engineer of the Erie Canal
- Harold Bell Wright (1872–1944), best-selling American author
- Albert Zachary, baseball pitcher
