= Jules Herbuveaux =

American jazz musician and television executive

- Born: Jules Richard Herbuveaux; August 17, 1901; Utica, New York, U.S.
- Died: February 9, 1990 (aged 92) Chicago, Illinois, U.S.
- Genres: Jazz
- Occupations: Saxophonist, orchestra director, program director, station general manager, national tv executive
- Years active: 1920–1968
- Spouse: Jeannette Lilian McNulty

Jules Richard Herbuveaux (October 2, 1897 – February 9, 1990) was an American orchestra director during the 1920s and 1930s, being a member and the leader of the Guyon's Paradise Orchestra and the Palmer House Victorians Orchestra. He created his own orchestra, the Jules Herbuveaux Orchestra, which he made collaborations records with Frank Sylvano in 1928. During his life as a musician he made a total of 44 records.

Herbuveaux was also a national television executive of the Chicago NBC station WMAQ-TV (was WNBQ) that became the first all-color station in the world in 1956 during his leadership.

== Early life ==
Jules Herbuveaux was born in Utica, New York, on October 2, 1897, to an American family that had immigrated from France and Ireland. He had an education in Christian Brothers Grammar School in Utica, Culver Military Academy and Harrison High School in Chicago, and finally at McGill University in Montreal.

== Career ==
Graduated from the Harrison High School he became a Navy flier for World War II then as his return he created his first orchestra band. Jules Herbuveaux was among the artists featured by Guyon's Paradise Gardens Chicago, the largest ballroom of America during the 1920s and made gramophone records for OKeh. In 1926, Palmer House Victorians with his leadership and later Jules Herbuveaux Orchestra produced a series of popular gramophone records for Brunswick until 1928. In 1928, he made his last records as a collaboration with the vocalist Frank Sylvano.

Then, thanks to his education and the taste for the television that was just born, Jules joined the Chicago NBC station WMAQ-TV (was WNBQ) as production manager in 1939. In 1948, he became program manager of NBC-TV's central division, then he sets a coaxial cable between the station and Illinois Bell Co. linking Chicago television with the rest of the United States. Jules is credited for the discover of talents like Dave Garroway, Garry Moore, Percy Faith, Fran Allison, Willard Waterman and Marlin Perkins.

In 1952, the Chicago NBC proposed the first 10p.m news show, thanks to this accomplissement he became the company vice president in 1955 that indicate that the first worldwide all-color station in 1956 was made under his leadership.

Jules leaves NBC in 1961 and his departure is made for a radio named Zenith Radio Corp. where he became a consultant. In 1965 the Zenith-owned radio station, WEFM, the oldest FM station in the country gain Jules as general manager.

In 1968, Jules made an appearance at the WMAQ-TV station with a documentary named Conversation with Jules Herbuveaux.

In 1997, 7 years after his death, he was made a Silver Circle Honorees by the National Academy of Television Arts & Sciences of Chicago.

== Personal life ==
Jules was married to Jeannette Lilian McNulty until his death on February 9, 1990, at the age of 92. He was survived by his 3 daughters; 10 grandchildren; and nine great-grandchildren.
