= Horace M. Singer =

American politician

Horace Meach Singer (October 1, 1823 – December 28, 1896) was an American businessman and politician from New York. Coming with his father to Lockport, Illinois work on the Illinois & Michigan Canal, Singer rose to become superintendent of repairs. In the course of his work, he came across a large quarry near Lemont, Illinois and established a company to mine it. Singer & Talcott was in operation until 1889. In 1866, Singer served a term in the Illinois House of Representatives, then was elected to the Cook County Board of Commissioners in the 1870s.

== Biography ==
Singer was born on October 1, 1823, in Schenectady, New York. When he was two, his family moved to Ashtabula County, Ohio. In 1836, they moved to Lockport, Illinois. His father was a canal and harbor laborer and came to work on the Illinois and Michigan Canal. Horace assisted his father with the construction of section 64 of that canal from 1836 to 1840. When the state ceased to provide funds for further construction in 1840, Singer took a job teaming, transporting passengers and freight within Illinois and Indiana. When construction resumed in 1845, Singer was appointed an engineer. In 1848, he was named superintendent of canal repairs, serving for four years. While working on the canal, Horace and his father were joined by Horace's uncle, Isaac Singer, the inventor.

While overseeing repairs, a large stratified dolomite quarry was found near Lemont, Illinois. He resigned as commissioner in 1852 to found H. M. Singer & Co. to develop the quarry. Singer was elected to the Illinois House of Representatives in 1866, serving a two-year term. He accepted Mancel Talcott as partner in 1854 and the firm became known as Singer & Talcott. The operation was officially incorporated as the Singer & Talcott Stone Company in the early 1870s. Around this time he was named to the Cook County Board of Commissioners and in 1874, Singer largely withdrew from company affairs. The company was sold in 1889 to the Western Stone Company. Singer was chairman of the committee overseeing the construction of the Cook County Criminal Court Building.

Singer was on the board of directors of the First National Bank of Chicago. He held stock in the Central Music Hall and served on its finance and executive committees. He was a member of the Union League Club of Chicago and the Calumet Club. Singer married Harriet A. Roberts on April 6, 1847. They had three sons: Edward T., Charles G., and Walter H. He died in Will County on December 28, 1896 and was buried in Lockport Cemetery.
