= Greater Union Baptist Church =

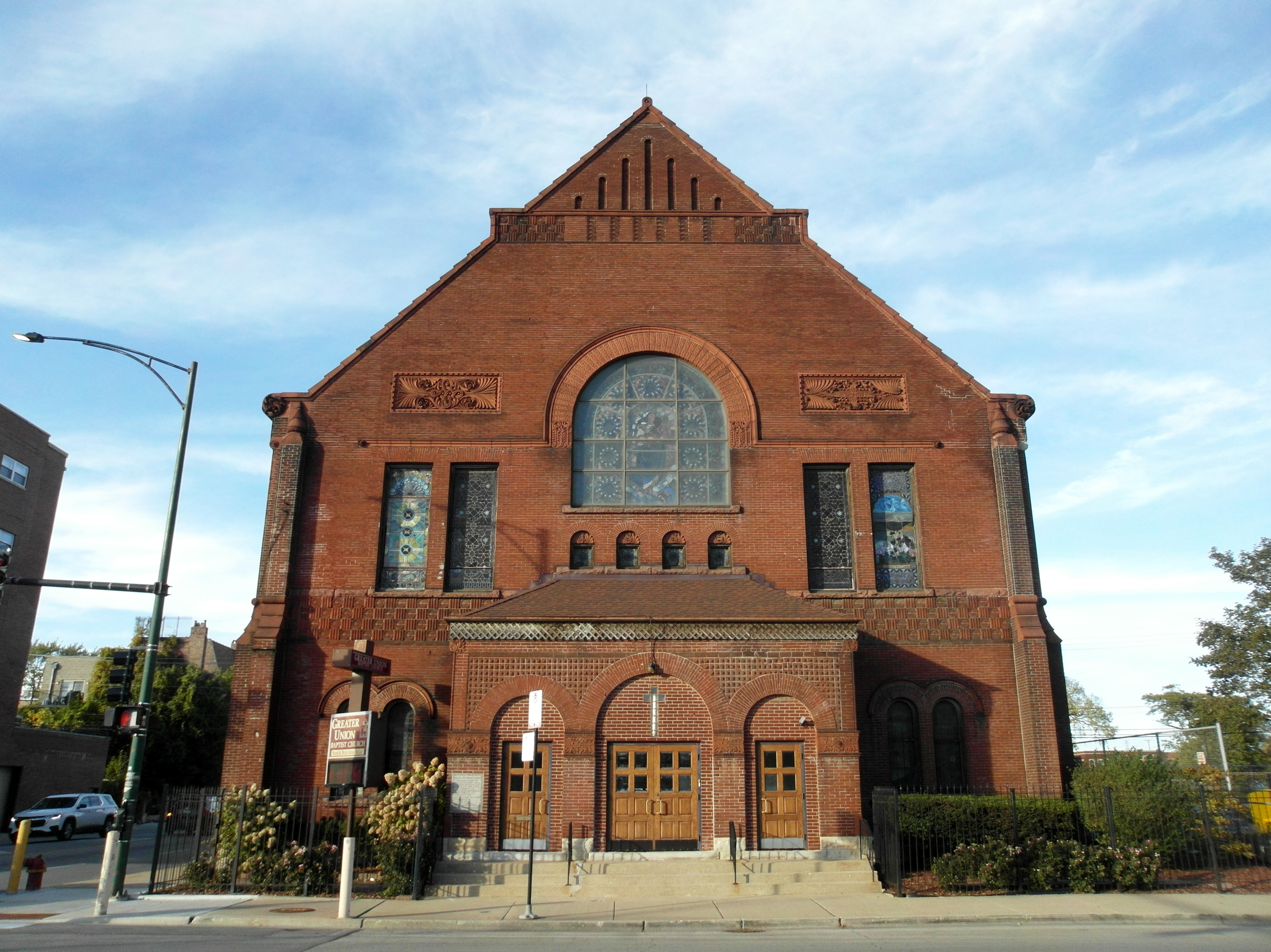
- Alternative names: Church of the Redeemer

General information
- Architectural style: Richardsonian Romanesque
- Location: 1956 W. Warren Boulevard, Chicago, Illinois
- Coordinates: 41°52′56.81″N 87°40′35.03″W
- Completed: 1886

Design and construction
- Architect(s): William Le Baron Jenney

Greater Union Baptist Church is a historic church located in Chicago's Near West Side. Built in 1886 and designed by the father of the skyscraper, William Le Baron Jenney, in the Richardsonian Romanesque style, the building originally housed the Church of the Redeemer, a Universalist congregation.

The site was designated as a Chicago Landmark on April 19, 2023.

== History ==
=== Church of the Redeemer ===
The Church of the Redeemer was established in 1858. They originally held services in the upper hall of the West Market on Randolph, before moving to a vacant Presbyterian church later in 1858. A. C. Barry pastored the church from 1858 to 1859. An abolitionist, Barry became an army chaplain in the Civil War. The congregation built their first church in 1861. The congregation held a firmly anti-slavery and pro-Union position on during the Civil War. Many members of the congregation enlisted in the Union Army. The superintendent of the Sunday school, J. H. Swan served as a lieutenant, and the church's pastor, J. H. Tuttle, presented him with his sword. Military drills were held in the church's lecture room. In November 1869, a meeting was held at the church to commemorate the hundredth anniversary of the introduction of Universalism to America, where $900,000 was raised for the denomination. Chicago Alderman Willard Woodard presided over the meeting and Amos G. Throop was a featured speaker.

In 1885, the property at the corner of Warren and Robey Street (presently called Damen Avenue) was donated by philanthropist Mary H. Talcott, widow of prominent businessman and politician Mancel Talcott, Jr., for the construction of a new church. The building was designed by the father of the skyscraper, William Le Baron Jenney. The church was built one year after Jenney designed the Home Insurance Building, the first skyscraper, and preceded many of Jenney's most famous buildings. The church cost $40,000 to build, with the pipe organ, donated by J. S. Dennis, and the furnishing and carpeting valued at an additional $10,000. Its stained glass windows were fabricated by McCully & Miles. The cornerstone of the church was laid on July 19, 1885, and its opening service was held on Easter Sunday 1886.

In 1895, Rev. Thomas B. Gregory, a well-known pastor from Halifax, Nova Scotia, was hired to pastor the Church of the Redeemer. At the time of his hiring, the church had a membership of 525, with an attendance of up to 750 for Sunday services. A liberal in his views, both political and theological, Gregory was a vocal advocate for shifting the tax burden to the wealthy and the direct election of U.S. Senators. On November 21, 1897, Gregory created considerable controversy when he preached a sermon where he declared that Protestant and Catholic Christianity "paralyses the intellect and turns us into driviling idiots", and that modern Christianity was "a wholly different thing from the religion proclaimed by Jesus". These statements were publicly rebuked by many prominent pastors in the area, representing a variety of denominations. In 1899, Gregory resigned as pastor in dramatic fashion, rebuking his congregation for not firing the trustees that opposed him, stating that if the trustees are in heaven "I am going to the other place", and comparing his departure to a prairie dog driven away from his hole by a "vicious peacock".

Unitarian minister, magazine editor, and uncle of Frank Lloyd Wright, Jenkin Lloyd Jones preached at the church in 1894. Actor James A. Herne spoke at the church in February 1898, advocating for the adoption of a single tax on valuable land, arguing that the country's present system of taxation fell disproportionately on the poor. On November 7, 1915, Mayor William Hale Thompson addressed the West Side People's Forum at the church.

=== Greater Union Baptist Church ===
In 1928, the church building was sold to Greater Union Missionary Baptist Church, pastored at the time by Rev. J. A. Royal. Originally known as Little Union Missionary Baptist Church, the congregation was formed in 1908. Civil rights activist and Chicago Baptist Institute trustee and faculty member Rev. Shelbia H. Graham pastored the church from 1947 to 1967. In June 1950, the church hosted the National Baptist Sunday School Congress. In September 1963, Rev. Graham led a fundraising effort by local pastors for the 16th Street Baptist Church in Birmingham, Alabama, following its bombing by Ku Klux Klan members.

On May 24, 1971, a gospel music concert was held at the church as part of a membership drive for the Chicago Urban League. Performers included Jessy Dixon and the Dixon Singers, Delois Barrett Campbell and the Barrett Sisters, the Norfleet Brothers, Vernon Oliver Price, and the Thompson Community Singers. From 1996 to 2002, the church was pastored by Walter Arthur McCray, who headed the National Black Evangelical Association. McCray returned to again pastor Greater Union Baptist Church on September 8, 2019.
