= Daniel Barwick =

American author, fundraiser, journalist, higher education administrator, and teacher

Daniel W. Barwick
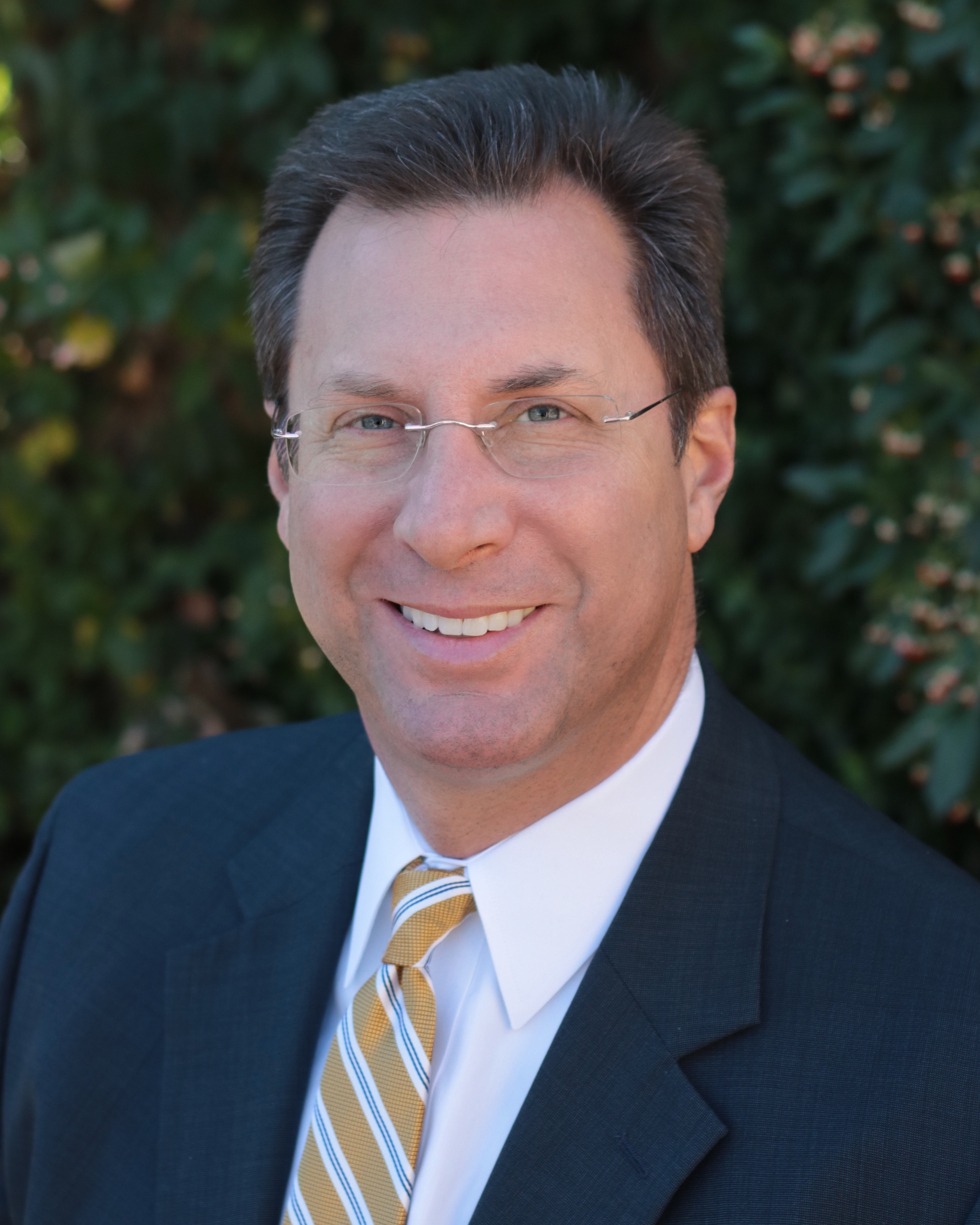
- Born: New Hartford, NY
- Education: SUNY Geneseo (BA); University of Iowa (MA); SUNY Buffalo (PhD)
- Occupation: Educator
- Spouse: Carin
- Children: 2

Daniel Workman Barwick (born June 21, 1968) is an American author, fundraiser, journalist, podcaster, higher education administrator, and teacher. He was the President of Independence Community College in Independence, Kansas from 2011 to 2019.

== Biography and education ==
Barwick was born in New Hartford, New York, and raised in Utica, New York. Following high school, he attended school in Strangnas, Sweden, as a Rotary International Exchange Student, returning to the United States in 1987 to attend the State University of New York College at Geneseo, where he completed his Bachelor of Arts degree. He then earned a Master of Arts degree in Philosophy from the University of Iowa, studying under Panayot Butchvarov. He earned his PhD from the State University of New York at Buffalo, where Barry Smith served as his dissertation advisor. His graduate work was primarily in metaphysics and bioethics, and his dissertation was on the metaphysics of concepts. He is a 2012 graduate of Leadership Independence and a 2013 graduate of Leadership Kansas.

== Career ==
Barwick was CEO of CBD Associates, LLC, a real estate holding company in New York, and CFO for The Well-Dressed Reader, an internet specialty company.

Barwick was Associate Professor of Philosophy and Director of Institutional Advancement at Alfred State College, Executive Director of that college's Development Fund, and held a number of other administrative positions there.

From 2008 to 2018, Barwick was certified by CFRE International, a provider of professional certification of fundraising proficiency. Since 2007, he has worked primarily as a fundraiser for nonprofit organizations, raising over $100M since that time.

Since 2018, Barwick has published a blog on higher education issues from a senior leadership perspective, The Mortarboard Blog. He hosts a companion podcast, The Mortarboard.

Barwick played a minor role as himself in the 2018 and 2019 seasons of the Netflix documentary series Last Chance U, which featured Independence Community College.

Barwick resigned as President of Independence Community College, he took on the role of president of the Mortarboard which was becoming a larger organization.

In 2020, Barwick became Director of Development of the School of Health and Human Services at Indiana State University. In his first two years at the university, Indiana State University achieved its highest ever university-wide fundraising totals, as well as its highest totals for the health sciences.

In 2022, Barwick became the Director of Philanthropy for the University of Missouri–Kansas City School of Dentistry, and Executive Director of the Rinehart Foundation. He also has periodically taught philosophy as an adjunct instructor for a variety of schools.

Barwick is the author of the 2020 book Risk and Reward: How Small Colleges Get Better Against the Odds, published by ABJames. He is also the author of the 1994 book Intentional Implications: The impact of a reduction of mind on philosophy, published by University Press of America. According to WorldCat, the book is held in 95 libraries.

In 2023, Barwick was arrested in Independence, Kansas for allegedly committing theft. Following an investigation, the charges were dismissed.

=== President of Independence Community College ===
He became President of Independence Community College in 2011, serving in that role until June 2019.

Barwick was named by Ingram's Business Magazine as one of the "Fifty Kansans You Should Know" in 2016. In 2017, he was elected President of the Council of Presidents, the Kansas-wide group of community college presidents. During the 2017-2018 fiscal year in which he represented Kansas Community Colleges, community college funding statewide received its first increase in eight years. Active in Rotary International, he became the president of the Independence, Kansas Rotary Club in 2017.

In 2013, Independence Community College became the first public college in Kansas to allow the concealed carry of handguns. As more states require public colleges to allow concealed carry, Barwick has spoken and published on the data gathered during the period since the rule was enacted, the process used to construct his campus' policy, and the insurance options for schools who choose to allow concealed carry.

In 2016, Barwick was one of eight presidents who threatened to leave the Kansas Jayhawk Community College Conference over concerns regarding football roster limitations. Barwick and the seven other presidents argued that the roster limitations were originally based on racial discrimination, and continued to have a discriminatory effect against minority athletes. The conference subsequently voted unanimously to eliminate the restrictions.

== Views ==
Following conflict in 2005-2006 that took place between the Alfred State College campus president Uma Gupta and employees, which attracted national coverage in the New York Times, The Chronicle of Higher Education, and other venues, Barwick identified the event as the first time that social media criticism had contributed substantially to the reassignment of a public college president, publishing positively reviewed analyses in national and international publications.

Barwick was a proponent of the view that a negative link between large class size, generically understood, and reduced learning outcomes has not been proven to exist in higher education, and has argued that additional funding for research is needed. An early advocate for the Mooc, he has argued that although a negative link has been established between certain types of instruction in large classes and learning outcomes, there was not sufficient experimentation with different instructional methods to determine whether large class size was always correlated with poorer outcomes.

In 2021, Barwick first published his view that the majority of colleges should shift to what he called a “trundle,” a teaching-based version of Scott Galloway’s “rundle,” which is itself a combination of bundling of services and a subscription-based payment model. Barwick has argued that the current transaction model of higher education, which requires a commitment of time, effort, and money from the student with no guarantee of success, is increasingly unattractive to prospective students and will gradually erode enrollments further.
