= Elizabeth E. Farrell =

Elizabeth E. Farrell (1870– October 15, 1932) was an American educator, first person to teach a class of special education students in an American public school, and first president of the Council for Exceptional Children.

== Early life and education ==
Elizabeth Farrell was born in Utica, New York. She attended Utica Catholic Academy and the Oswego Normal and Training School. When she finished basic teacher training in 1895, she pursued further study at New York University and Teachers College, Columbia University, eventually earning a bachelor's degree.

== Career ==
Farrell taught one year at a small school in Oneida Castle, New York before accepting a position at Henry Street Settlement in New York City. She taught at Public School No. 1 while living at the settlement house, and working with Lillian Wald, the director of Henry Street. Her students, all boys, were a range of ages, and thus the class was called "ungraded". Soon other "ungraded" classes were established in New York schools, after her model; in 1906 Farrell became director of special education, with the title "Inspector of Ungraded Classes."

As Inspector, Farrell began a diagnostic clinic to test schoolchildren for underlying causes of poor academic achievement. She also began a journal, titled Ungraded, to share findings with other special education professionals. She was a frequent lecturer, and taught pioneering special education courses at Teachers College Columbia University and at the University of Pennsylvania. Her authority over classrooms throughout New York's public schools raised concerns about loss of local control, and in 1917 teachers unanimously approved a resolution to limit her influence.

In 1922, she became one of the founders and the first president of the International Council for Exceptional Children.

== Personal life and legacy ==
Farrell died in Cleveland, Ohio, in the autumn of 1932, age 62. Earlier in 1932, she was honored at a luncheon marking the twenty-fifth anniversary of the Ungraded Class Teachers' Association, an organization she founded. Speakers at her memorial service included her Columbia University colleagues Leta Stetter Hollingworth and Edward L. Thorndike.

Public School No. 116 in Brooklyn, New York is named for Elizabeth Farrell.
