= Frank DuRoss =

American businessman

Frank B. DuRoss is a professional sports franchise owner in the United States. In June 2013, Frank DuRoss and former NHL goalie Robert Esche announced the relocation of the Vancouver Canucks' AHL franchise to the Utica Memorial Auditorium, as the Utica Comets. In conjunction with the announcement, Frank DuRoss and Robert Esche announced the formation of the Mohawk Valley Garden to oversee the complete management of the Utica Memorial Auditorium. His most recent venture is a partnership with Robert Esche on a MASL team, the Utica City FC.

DuRoss began his corporate career in 1976 when he entered a partnership with his brother, Jim, and was named vice president of Oneida Building Services, Inc., a company the DuRoss brothers would sell in 1986 to International Service Systems, Inc.

In 1980 the brothers created Oneida Asbestos Removal, Inc. This highly successful company had $24 million in annual sales, and, at the time, was one of the 350 fastest growing privately held companies in the country.

In 1987, Frank DuRoss ventured into the sports industry when he became part of a group of investors in the Utica Devils of the American Hockey League (AHL). Four years later he co-purchased the Maine Mariners and moved them to Providence, Rhode Island, as the Providence Bruins. On April 10, 2001, DuRoss purchased 100% of the Providence Bruins from his former partner Ed Anderson. In August 2006, DuRoss sold the Providence Bruins to businessman H. Larue Renfroe. Duross previously served on the executive committee of both the American Hockey League and the United Soccer Leagues.

Frank DuRoss, along with partners Steve Donner and Chris Economides, owned the Rochester Raging Rhinos soccer team, a USL First Division side, from the team's inception in 1995. A native of Utica, New York, DuRoss was the catalyst in the Rhinos' drive for PAETEC Park, a new multi-purpose outdoor stadium in Rochester, New York. Frank's efforts, including working with local and state political leaders, secured funds for the new stadium, a 17,500-seat soccer specific stadium. The state of New York committed $15 million for the project.

In the following decade, the Rhinos won the A-League three times and captured the Lamar Hunt US Open Cup in 1999. The Rhinos' ownership trio was inducted into the USL Hall of Fame in 2005 as builders. In 2006, DuRoss along with partners Donner and Economides formed the Carolina RailHawks F.C., USL First Division soccer team located in Cary, North Carolina. DuRoss sold his interest in the Carolina team by late 2007 and by March 2008 had dissolved his ownership in the Rhinos.

Co-founder of the National Lacrosse League (NLL), DuRoss at one time owned the Boston Blazers. In addition DuRoss was an original owner in Major League Lacrosse previously operating the Rochester Rattlers lacrosse team, a member of the ten-team league until 2008 when the team relocated to Toronto.

DuRoss was part of an investment group that managed the restaurants, concessions and noveltyoperations of the ESL Sports Centre, a four-arena, multi-purpose complex on the campus of Monroe Community College in Rochester, New York.

Previously DuRoss owned Sylvan Strands Realty Corporation and DuRoss Realty Corporation, a commercial real estate property development companies, he formerly owned various media properties including radio station (WOWZ FM-97.9) in Utica and the rights to a television station in Des Moines, Iowa and Greenville, South Carolina.

Most recently, DuRoss, along with his partners from Mohawk Valley Garden, announced the opening of 72 Tavern & Grill, a full-service restaurant attached to the Adirondack Bank Center at the Utica Memorial Auditorium. He also announced the purchase and relaunch of the former Babe's restaurant in Utica, Babe's at Harbor Point, a 300-seat family-themed restaurant featuring memorabilia from the Utica Comets and UCFC. DuRoss and his partners recently completed the construction and opening of the Utica University NEXUS Center a 170,000 square foot multi use event center, it feature 3 regulation size ice rinks, 15 locker rooms, a community center and a restaurant. The Nexus center lat year drew over 300,000 attendees to the Nexus Center, with 40% coming from outside of NYS. MVG recently completed purchase and rehabilitation of the 5 story Utica Children's Museum, keeping its historic appearance it now has 21 apartments and a farm to table restaurant, the Taylor and the Cook.

== Family ==
Frank and his wife have two children and six grandchildren.
