= Frank Sylvano =

American jazz vocalist (1901–1964)

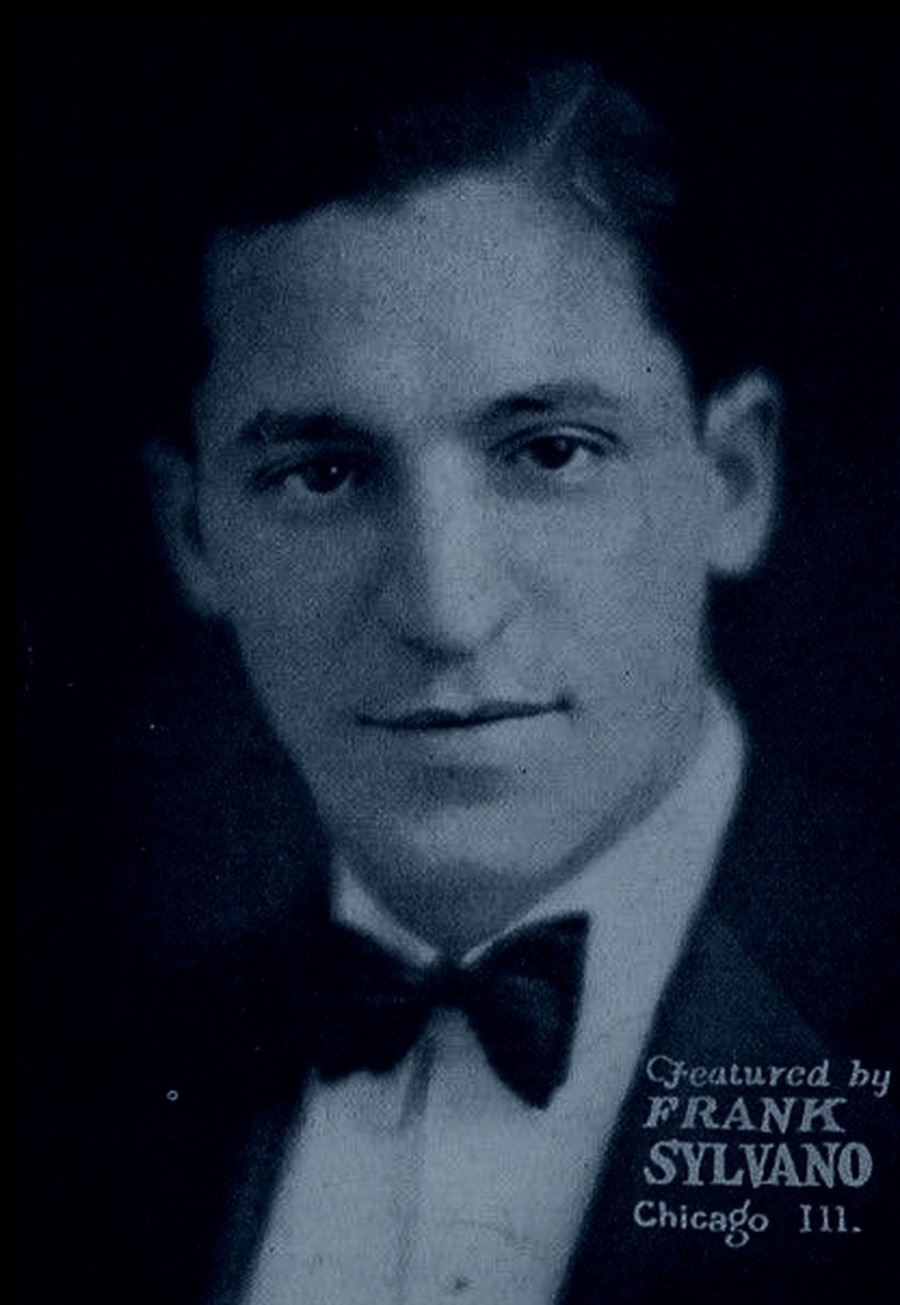
- Sylvano in 1925

Background information
- Born: Francesco Lanzalotti Sylvano; August 17, 1901; Chicago, Illinois, U.S.
- Died: September 1, 1964 (aged 63) Chicago, Illinois, U.S.
- Genre: Jazz
- Occupation: Vocalist
- Years active: 1919–1936
- Label: Brunswick
- Spouse: Virginia Sylvano

Francesco Lanzalotti Sylvano (August 17, 1901 – September 1, 1964) was an American tenor of the 1920s and 1930s. A member of the Isham Jones Orchestra, he was described as "the romantic voice of the air."

Frankie Laine, who in his youth met Sylvano, characterized him as having a "bouncy style" in his 1993 autobiography, That Lucky Old Son: The Autobiography of Frankie Laine.

== Early life ==
Frank Sylvano was born in Chicago, Illinois, on August 17, 1901, to an Italian-American family. Having become a choirboy, he later secured employment as a song plugger for a music publisher at the age of 18.

== Career ==
Sylvano was among the vocalists featured by Isham Jones during the 1920s and 1930s when the band produced a series of popular gramophone records for Brunswick. In 1921, Sylvano sang on Chicago's inaugural radio station, KYW, on the very night of its first broadcast. Three years later, he performed for the then Prince of Wales Edward VIII, during his visit to Chicago. Thereupon, he sang alongside not only Jones's orchestra, but also Abe Lyman's, Ben Bernie's, and Fred Waring's, contributing approximately 500 vocal choruses on records for these prominent orchestras.

By 1936, Sylvano was said to have retired from the entertainment field, deciding to later operate a café on the South Side of Chicago.

== Personal life ==
Sylvano was married to a woman by the name of Virginia until his death on September 1, 1964, at the age of 63. He was survived by her, along with his two daughters, Joan and Jean.
