= Georgia Roberts Durston =

American writer (1868–1947)

- Born: December 1, 1868; Utica, New York, U.S.
- Died: July 4, 1947 (aged 78); San Antonio, Texas, U.S.
- Other names: George Durston, Major Robert Maitland, Colonel George Durston, Captain John Blaine, and Colonel James Fiske
- Occupation: Writer
- Spouse: Alfred Tennyson Durston (m. 1890)
- Children: 1

Georgia Roberts Durston (December 1, 1868 – July 4, 1947) was an American writer born in Utica, New York, who wrote novels, outdoor articles and poetry. Her novels appeared under various male pen names including George Durston, Major Robert Maitland, Colonel George Durston, Captain John Blaine, and Colonel James Fiske. Her animal poems became familiar to generations of school children through inclusion in the Roberts English series.

== Biography ==
=== Early life ===
Georgia Roberts Durston was born December 1, 1868, in Utica, New York, the only child of Thomas Dana Roberts and his wife, Shattiece D. MacKenzie. As a teenager, Georgia Roberts attended Houghton Seminary, a boarding school for girls in Clinton, New York. After she graduated, Georgia remained active in the school's alumnae association and made the welcoming address at commencement exercises for her graduating class in 1886 and again at Houghton Seminary's 35th annual commencement exercises in 1896.

Georgia had planned to enter college but was in poor health so she went instead to the health spa at Glen Haven, New York, near the southern end of Skaneateles Lake. It was there that a Dr. Jackson treated patients with the "water cure" consisting of fresh air, mild exercise, rest, and healthful baths in mountain water.

=== Marriage and family ===
On July 2, 1890, Georgia married Alfred Tennyson Durston of Syracuse, New York. After their marriage, Georgia and Alfred spent three years traveling together. Georgia and her husband spent much of their spare time outdoors and, in 1897, she had an article on deer hunting published in Outing magazine. In 1998, Outing published her article on fly-fishing on the Oswegatchie River. That year Georgia and Alfred had a daughter, Georgia Durston (1898–1952), nicknamed "Babe". Georgia continued writing and, in 1906, her children's poems were published by Saalfield Publishing and dedicated to her daughter. The two titles, Candlelight and The Toy Village, were lavishly illustrated by Katharine H. Greenland.

In 1909, Alfred Durston died very suddenly of a heart attack at the age of 40. After her husband's death, Georgia and her daughter continued to live in Syracuse at "Primrose Farm". In addition to raising Plymouth Rock chickens for eggs, they kept a number of pets. At the New York State Fair they exhibited their six Collies, an Airedale, and a Brussels Griffon. One of their collies, Knocklayde King Ben, won all possible prizes in his class in 1915.

=== Career ===
Georgia Roberts Durston, was one of the authors hired by Saalfield Publishing to write a series of books for teenage boys with a patriotic theme featuring Boy Scouts. The other ghostwriters for the series were male authors of popular series books for boys, Frederick Van Rensselaer Dey, William Almon Wolff, and John William Duffield. Twenty-four books appeared in the Boy Scouts series between 1912 and 1919 under the publisher-owned pseudonym, Major Robert Maitland. Georgia held the copyright for No. 9 in the series, The Boy Scouts' Champion Recruit; No. 10 Boy Scouts' Defiance; and No. 11 Boy Scouts' Challenge. The Durston's dog, Knocklayde King Ben, shared his name with the collie in the book The Boy Scouts to the Rescue. The series was later reprinted under the pseudonym Colonel George Durston.

Georgia also held the 1918 copyright for the book Boy Scouts on a Submarine by Captain John Blaine, published by Saalfield. The same book had already been published with the title Fighting the U-boat Menace by Colonel James Fiske. She has also been credited with A Boy's Life of General Pershing, which was published under the pseudonym George Durston. The book was a biography of John J. Pershing with the addition of the fictional "George Durston" as a character in the book playing Pershing's childhood friend in Laclede, Missouri, and replacing Lewis Hunt as Pershing's first roommate at West Point.

=== Death and afterward ===
Georgia Roberts Durston died on July 4, 1947, in San Antonio at the age of 78. She is buried there at Sunset Memorial Park.

Although her books are long out of print, Durston's most popular poems, "The Wolf" and "The Rabbit", continued to appear in various anthologies ranging from the Random House Book of Poetry for Children to the Australian Broadcasting Company's More Favourite Play School Stories.
