= Laura Casamento =

Laura M. Casamento is the ninth president of Utica University. She was appointed on August 1, 2016 and is the first woman to serve as the college's president. She holds an MBA from Rensselaer Polytechnic Institute and an EdD from the University of Pennsylvania.

Casamento previously served as executive vice president and chief advancement officer at Utica College. Before her tenure at Utica, which began in 2004, she served as president and CEO of Herkimer County Trust from 1998 to 2002.

In August 2022, she announced that the 2022-2023 would be her final year as president and that she plans to retire on July 31, 2023.
