= Samuel Bellamy Beach =

American author

Samuel Bellamy Beach (ca. 1780 – July 31, 1866) was an American author, publisher, manufacturer, and postal official.

== Early life and education ==
Beach was born in Litchfield, Connecticut, and raised in Whitestown, New York, the son of Ashbel Beach and Anna Bellamy Beach. He graduated from Yale College in 1805.

== Career ==
In 1822, Beach published a poem of 109 pages, titled Escalala, an American Tale. In 1837, after the election of President Martin Van Buren, he was appointed to a clerkship in the Post Office Department at Washington, in which department he remained for most of the time until after President Abraham Lincoln's election. He was long a resident of Oneonta, New York, and identified with many public improvements there. He was the original projector of the Albany and Susquehanna Railroad.

== Personal life ==
Beach married twice, to Ann Porter in 1815 and to Martha M. Bates after 1834; they had several children. He died in Oneonta in 1866, in his mid-eighties. In 1867, his youngest son Victor killed his mother, Martha Bates Beach; Victor survived a suicide attempt at the same time, and was institutionalized after the incident.
