= Mary E. Young =

American historian

- Born: December 16, 1929; Utica, New York, United States
- Died: February 12, 2021 (aged 91); Rochester, New York, United States
- Occupation: historian
- Known for: Redskins, Ruffleshirts, and Rednecks: Indian Allotments in Mississippi and Alabama, 1830–1860
- Awards: American Studies Association prize for best article in the American Quarterly; Ray Allen Billington Award from the Western History Association

Mary E. Young (December 16, 1929–February 12, 2021) was an American historian.

== Life and career ==
Born on December 16, 1929, in Utica, New York, Young studied at Oberlin College and Cornell University. In 1955 She started her teaching career at Ohio State University as an instructor. She went on to become a full professor in 1969. She taught at the University of Rochester from 1973 to 2000, and retired as professor emeritus. Young was known for including Native American history in her teaching of American history.

In 1961 her book Redskins, Ruffleshirts, and Rednecks: Indian Allotments in Mississippi and Alabama, 1830–1860 was published by the University of Oklahoma Press. It was reprinted in 2002. She was the recipient of the American Studies Association prize for best article in the American Quarterly and the Ray Allen Billington Award from the Western History Association.

Young died on February 12, 2021, in Rochester.
