= Frank O. Fournia =

US Army Medal of Honor recipient (1873–1912)

Frank Ottis Fournia
- Born: January 1873; Rome, New York, United States
- Died: February 28, 1912 (aged 39); Rome, New York, United States
- Burial place: St. Agnes Cemetery, Menands, New York
- Military career
- Allegiance: United States
- Branch: United States Army
- Service years: 1898
- Rank: Private
- Unit: 21st Infantry Regiment
- Conflicts: Spanish–American War
- Awards: Medal of Honor

Frank Ottis Fournia (1873–1912) was a private serving in the United States Army during the Spanish–American War, who received the Medal of Honor for bravery.

== Biography ==
Born in Rome, New York in January 1873, Fournia joined the army from Plattsburgh, New York in May 1898. He served in the Spanish–American War with Company H, 21st Infantry Regiment, as a private where he received the Medal of Honor for his actions. He was discharged in November of the same year.

== Medal of Honor citation ==
Rank and organization: Private, Company H, 21st U.S. Infantry. Place and date: At Santiago, Cuba, 1 July 1898. Entered service at: Plattsburg, N.Y. Birth: Rome, N.Y. Date of issue: 22 June 1899. Citation:

Gallantly assisted in the rescue of the wounded from in front of the lines and while under heavy fire of the enemy.

Fournia died in his hometown on February 28, 1912.

== See also ==
- List of Medal of Honor recipients for the Spanish–American War
