= Chuck Detwiler =

American football player (born 1947)

No. 35, 42, 8
- Position: Defensive back

Personal information
- Born: March 6, 1947 (age 79); Rome, New York, U.S.
- Listed height: 6 ft 0 in (1.83 m)
- Listed weight: 185 lb (84 kg)

Career information
- High school: Glendora (Glendora, California)
- College: Utah State

Career history
- San Diego Chargers (1970–1972); St. Louis Cardinals (1973); The Hawaiians (1974–1975)
- Stats at Pro Football Reference

Charles Michael Detwiler (born March 6, 1947) is an American former professional football defensive back who played four seasons in the National Football League (NFL) with the San Diego Chargers and St. Louis Cardinals. He played college football at Utah State University. He was also a member of The Hawaiians of the World Football League (WFL).

== Early life ==
Detwiler attended Glendora High School in Glendora, California.

== Professional career ==
After graduating from Utah State, Detwiler made his pro debut for the Alabama Hawks of the Continental Football League in 1969. His stats in the minor league were impressive. Eight interception with 102 return yards and a touchdown. He also returned punts and kicks for the Hawks as well. His abilities drew scouts from the NFL, and he was signed by the San Diego Chargers. Detwiler played on special teams in and package situations on defense. He returned one punt in 1970 for the Chargers, netting negative five yards.

After appearing in eleven games his rookie season, he appeared in just one his second season. One of the highlights in his rookie season was scoring a touchdown on a special teams play. Detwiler picked up the forced fumble and returned it twenty yards for a touchdown that put San Diego up 14-3. The Chargers went on to defeat the Cleveland Browns 27-10.

After his second season, he was awarded on waivers to the St. Louis Cardinals. After signing as a free agent with the Buffalo Bills in the offseason, he was waived during one of the final cut downs. Detwiler played in 10 games for the Cardinals, starting six, mainly on special teams as a returner. Seeking to get more chances as a starter, Detwiler was one of many hopefuls who jumped from the NFL to the newly formed World Football League. He signed with the Hawaiians, where two of his fellow hopefuls where two former NFL quarterbacks, Edd Hargett and Jim Fassel. However, the World Football League would fold after two seasons, awash in red ink. Detwiler gave the NFL one last shot, signing as a free agent with the Denver Broncos. However, the Broncos had a well stocked defense and one of the top return specialist, Rick Upchurch, in the NFL. After being released in the final wave of cuts, Detwiler quietly retired from football.

== Coaching career ==
After his playing career ended, he went in to coaching, with stops at, among other places, Stanford University and Emporia State University.
