= Jasper W. Gilbert =

American jurist (1812–1899)

Jasper Willet Gilbert (January 15, 1812 – February 10, 1899) was an American jurist and attorney who served on the New York Supreme Court.

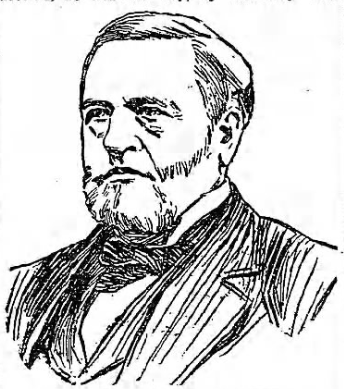
Jasper W. Gilbert

== Early life ==
Gilbert was born on January 15, 1812, in Rome, New York. His parents were Sallie Easton and Marinus Willet Gilbert, a merchant in Watertown, New York. He was educated at grammar schools in Rome before attending academies in Watertown and Lowville, New York. In 1830, he enrolled in the American Literary, Scientific and Military Academy. in Vermont, graduating in 1832. He then studied law under Abraham Varick in Utica from 1833 to 1844, followed by studying with Frederick Whittlesey in Rochester. Gilbert was accepted to the New York Bar on July 11, 1835.

== Career ==
Gilbert started practicing law in Rochester in July 1835. In 1835, Governor William L. Marcy and the New York State Senate appointed him to the position of master of the chancery for the eighth judicial district. He became the first corporate counsel for the City of Rochester in 1839, serving in this capacity until 1842. One of his key decisions as counsel was to allow African American children to attend the city's public schools. Gilbert was the district attorney of Monroe County, New York from 1843 to 1846. He moved to New York City in 1847 and established a private practice.

He was elected to the New York Supreme Court on November 7, 1865. He represented the second judicial district. He was reelected in 1873. Gilbert's "judicial opinions were marked by brevity, accurate learning, sound judgment and remarkable clearness and purity of style." In 1882, he sent an entire board of aldermen to jail for contempt of court, an act that The Standard Union called, "spectacular". He was a Supreme Court justice until January 1, 1883, when he had to retire because of the constitutional age limit of seventy.

In his retirement, Gilbert was in practice with his two sons and Alexander Cameron from 1883 to 1890. Their practice was located at 213 Montague Street in Brooklyn and 67 Wall Street in New York City.

== Personal life ==
Gilbert married Katherine A. Moore of New York City in 1845. Initially, the couple lived in New York City and moved to Brooklyn in April 1851. Their children included daughters Louise S. Gilbert and Ellen G. Gilbert and sons James H. Gilbert and William T. Gilbert, who were both also lawyers. His nephew was architect Bradford Gilbert.

In 1836, he was a delegate to the state Democratic convention. Gilbert became a Whig and was the delegate for Monroe County at the Whig Convention in July 1838, where he made the address. When the Whig party dissolved in 1856, he returned to the Democratic Party.

Gilbert was a member the Church of the Holy Trinity in the Washington Heights. He served on the standing committee of the Episcopal Diocese of Long Island and was a vice-chancellor of the Cathedral of the Incarnation in Garden City, New York. He served on the state's charity commission and was president of the Green-Wood Cemetery. He was a member of the Brooklyn Club. the Hamilton Club, and the Long Island Historical Society.

After being ill for a month, Gilbert died at the age of 87 on February 10, 1898, at his home at 166 Remson Street in Brooklyn. He was buried in the Green-Wood Cemetery in Brooklyn
