= Mancel Talcott =

American businessman and politician

Member of the Chicago City Council
- In office 1863–1864
- In office 1865–1867
- Constituency: 9th Ward

Cook County Commissioner
- In office December 4, 1871 – December 14, 1871

Personal details
- Born: October 12, 1817 Rome, New York
- Died: June 5, 1878 (aged 60) Chicago, Illinois
- Party: Republican

Mancel Talcott, Jr. (October 12, 1817 – June 5, 1878) was a businessman and politician from Chicago, Illinois. He served as a Republican member of the Chicago City Council and the Cook County Board of Commissioners.

== Personal life ==
Born in Rome, New York, on October 12, 1817, to parents Mancel, Sr. and Betsy Talcott, he moved to Chicago in 1834. In 1841, he moved to a farm in Park Ridge, Illinois. In 1849, during the height of the California Gold Rush, he moved to California, where he lived for three years before returning to Park Ridge.

Mancel Talcott married Mary H. Otis on October 25, 1841. He was a member of the Church of the Redeemer, and was a major donor to the church. In 1885, his widow donated the property upon which the Church of the Redeemer built their new church.

In 1874, Talcott was the victim of a home invasion. While fighting off the invader, Talcott swung a chair, which struck a gas fixture, causing an explosion that injured him severely and from which he never fully recovered. He died at his home in Chicago on June 5, 1878, from a heart ailment, though the lingering effects of the gas explosion was believed to have been a contributing factor. Mancel Talcott Public School, in Chicago's West Town neighborhood, is named in his honor.

== Business career ==
In 1854, Talcott entered into a business partnership with Horace M. Singer and co-founded the Singer & Talcott Stone Company. He also co-founded the First National Bank of Chicago and served periods as president of the Union Stock Yards National Bank and the Excelsior Stone Company.

== Political career ==
In 1854, Talcott was a delegate to the Anti-Nebraska State Convention. In 1863, he was elected alderman for Chicago's Ninth Ward. He ran for re-election in 1864, but lost the Republican primary. However, he was reelected in 1865 and served until 1867. In November 1871, Talcott was elected in the first election for the Cook County Board of Commissioners. Ten days after taking office as county commissioner, the county board elected him to the Board of Police and Fire Commissioners, and he resigned his position on the county board. On December 18, 1871, he was elected president of the police board. As president of the police board, Talcott pushed for stricter enforcement of the city's law prohibiting the sale of alcohol on Sundays, but encountered opposition from those who felt that to do so would be politically damaging. He remained on the police board until December 2, 1872.
