= Allegheny HYP Club =

Private social club in downtown Pittsburgh, Pennsylvania

Allegheny HYP Club (Harvard-Yale-Princeton Club)
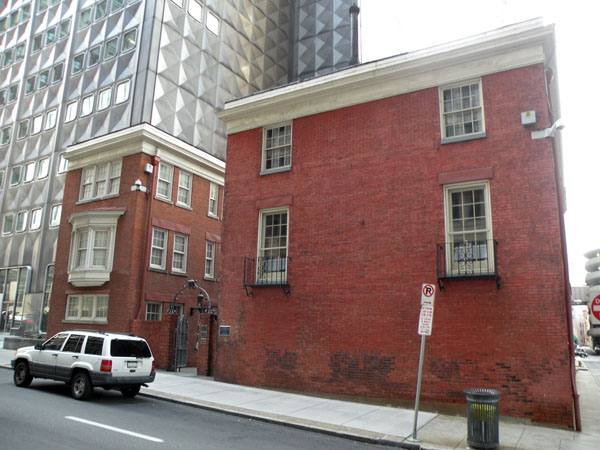

- Location of 617-619 William Penn Place in Pittsburgh
- 40°26′30.15″N 79°59′46.86″W
- Location: 617-619 William Penn Place (Downtown), Pittsburgh, Pennsylvania, USA

History
- Built: circa 1890, remodeled in 1930 and 1931

Site notes
- Architect: Edward B. Lee (architect for remodeling)

Pittsburgh Landmark – PHLF
- Designated: 2002

The Allegheny HYP Club (Harvard-Yale-Princeton Club) is a private social club in downtown Pittsburgh, Pennsylvania, founded on November 7, 1930. It is located at 617-619 William Penn Place. The building itself was built in 1894 and added to the List of Pittsburgh History and Landmarks Foundation Historic Landmarks in 2002.

On July 1, 1997, the club absorbed the Pittsburgh Club membership and assets and merged with the Allegheny Club in 2002 after the Allegheny Club filed for bankruptcy protection.

The club operates under an IRS ruling from 1945 under 501(c)(7) Social and Recreation Clubs; in 2023 it claimed total revenue of $284,187, total expenses of $416,110, and total assets of $152,596. Allegheny HYP Club Preservation Inc. was founded in 2013 as a 501(c)(3) Public Charity. In 2014, it claimed total revenue of $3,647 and total assets of $6,420.

== Architecture ==
The clubhouse itself now occupies the right half of a building built in 1893, originally as a tenement hall for laborers in Downtown Pittsburgh. In 1930, the club purchased the building, and over the next few years, Edward Brown Lee Sr., who studied at Harvard University and the École des Beaux-Arts in Paris, France, remodeled it. Lee is also known for his work designing the Pittsburgh Chamber of Commerce Building, the Edgewood Club, and many of the buildings on the campus of Thiel College.

One first enters the clubhouse through the courtyard, where one passes historical plaques about the clubhouse, outdoor tables and chairs, and the iconic archway and "HYP" lamp. The columns at the end of the courtyard are from the old Appleton Chapel on Harvard's campus (demolished 1931), and the Graystone that paves the courtyard was gifted by Thomas Watson, Yale alumnus and early president of the HYP Club in 1935.

The first-floor foyer and lounge are furnished with countless artifacts and memorabilia from the 3 respective schools. On the back wall of the lounge, framed Ivy League football rosters ranging from the 1930s-1970s are on display, which all note which college out of the three (Harvard, Yale, or Princeton) won the conference league that year. The original wood bar top is engraved with a Latin toast from 1693 that reads: "There are five reasons why men drink – good wine, a friend, because I’m dry or lest I should be by-and-by, or any other reason why". The circular backbar is fashioned to resemble the side of a wine barrel & frequently features some of the most in-demand and sought-after bourbons, scotches, and spirits.

Up the stairwell from the Lounge is the second-floor Dining Room, which features knotty pine wood planking. Painted upon the walls are the names of past club presidents, club founders, members of the Constitutional Convention and Declaration of Independence, and Ivy League alumni. The Dining Room contains a full-service industrial kitchen & a display of Wedgwood china commemorating each university in H-Y-P.

The third floor houses two important rooms: the club Library & the "Board Room" Cigar Lounge. The Library contains hundreds of rare books, including an original copy of Charles Dickens' Great Expectations, handwritten journals from Helen Keller, a Princeton notebook from a student of then-professor Woodrow Wilson, and past attendance books signed by J. Robert Oppenheimer and Albert Einstein, when they visited the clubhouse to attend a conference on atomic energy in the 1950's. The "Board Room" Cigar Lounge is across the hallway and is colloquially known as the "Pittsburgh Room", as the walls are decorated with memorabilia from the days of the Pittsburgh Club (1897-1997). The cigar lounge also features a piano, television, and telecom system, with the bar on the first floor.

== Leadership ==
In 2024, the club elected Christopher Profeta as its president. His tenure has focused on reviving the club's civic relevance by expanding public-facing programming, introducing monthly "First Friday" events, and forging partnerships with regional nonprofits and cultural institutions in Pittsburgh.

== Reciprocity ==
The club maintains reciprocal privileges with over 70 clubs domestic and abroad, including the Marines' Memorial of San Francisco, the Racquet Club of Philadelphia, the Union League Club of Chicago, the Fort Schuyler Club, and the City University Club in London. Reciprocal privileges include dining, golf, sports, and overnight stays.

== Programming ==
The "HYP Club" is host to a wide variety of programming and events for the Greater Pittsburgh area. The Pittsburgh Business Club hosts monthly lectures and networking events that have attracted local leaders and speakers in the fields of finance, robotics, real estate, and marketing. The club also hosts the monthly AHYP History Series, where guest experts provide presentations, education, and Q+A on different aspects of local Pittsburgh history; some of the most popular installments in this ongoing series have covered the likes of Kennywood, Andy Warhol, Charles "Teenie" Harris, Roberto Clemente, and the now-closed Kaufmann's flagship department store.

A classic HYP tradition is the monthly "Stammtisch" luncheon & Members' Dinner, which serves as a get-together for the membership base to bond and catch up over dynamic and hearty dishes. At these meals, each guest has 3 napkins available (red, blue, and orange)t; according to club tradition, a Harvard alum would receive a crimson napkin, a Yale alum a blue napkin, and a Princeton alum an orange napkin. Members from universities outside of "H", "Y", or "P" typically choose their napkin color to align closest to their college's color - for instance, the members from the University of Pittsburgh typically choose a blue napkin, since that is closest to Pitt's color scheme.

The HYP Club is also the official host location for the Pittsburgh Petroleum Club, which aims to foster networking and fellowship for leaders in the energy sector of western Pennsylvania.

Other initiatives the club hosts include wine tastings, jazz concerts, art shows, cooking classes, improv comedy, and dinner theatre. Club members can also reserve the Library, Dining Room, Cigar Lounge, or 1st-floor Lounge for their own hosting or programming needs.

== See also ==
- List of American gentlemen's clubs
- Duquesne Club
- Economic Club of Pittsburgh
- Greater Pittsburgh Chamber of Commerce
