= Franklin D. Roosevelt in Central New York =

Franklin D. Roosevelt made several visits to Central New York as acting governor, campaigning for his presidency and visiting.

== History ==
In 1928, he was late entering the governor's race. Observers predicted that his disability would create challenges in office. Therefore, he campaigned through upstate New York to demonstrate his capacity. In Utica, Rufus Elefante, a political boss and allies, organized Roosevelt's visits and campaigns. A parade proceeded down east Utica's main artery, Bleecker Street, followed by a rally in a local theater that was broadcast on the radio.

In 1931, as governor he spoke at the first commencement of the Owen D. Young School in Vanhornesville, New York. He was friends with Young. They had known each other since Young was an assistant secretary of the Navy. FDR gave the address to the first graduating class. Roosevelt pointed out how well the educational program was ranked and how it offered access to the nation and the world beyond a potentially isolated community. The governor mentioned his own background growing up in a rural area. Young said to Roosevelt, "Our friendship and good wishes go with you in all the undertakings in which you now are or may hereafter be engaged."

On August 6, 1931, Roosevelt made another trip to Central New York. It was an "annual trip" up to the valley. He visited the towns of Canajoharie, Fort Plain and Amsterdam. Roosevelt made a brief stop at the barrage canal lock in Canajoharie. His party exchanged greetings among the locals as part of "the goodwill tour up the historic Mohawk Valley". The governor was greeted by a throng of people wanting to get a close up view of him. Mayor Harry V. Bush and trustee W. J. Roser welcomed him and Joseph Traudt, a florist of Canajoharie, bestowed FDR's wife, Eleanor Roosevelt, with a bouquet of flowers.

On October 27, 1936, Roosevelt came to Utica and spoke for his presidency campaign. He talked about how the state had improved since the Great Depression had passed. He said, "Everywhere we went there was one thing that was different from the year 1932 — there are now smiles on the faces of the men and women of America." He also discussed in his speech how he went to Albany as governor in 1929 and the country was crashing from the Depression. FDR said that Albany had little help from Washington and he was starting new programs. "With the help of the farmers and the farm leaders themselves we began, for the first time, a farm program in this State." Roosevelt discussed his presidency and that under the leadership of Governor Herbert H. Lehman, the state has "the same kind of forward-looking liberal government, trying to take care of the great majority of the people, that we have been trying to maintain in Washington." Roosevelt then wrapped the speech up with, "My friends, I am mighty glad to come back into my own home state. It is a pretty fine state to live in."
