= Utica City School District =

School district in the U.S. state of New York

Location
- Utica, New York Mohawk Valley United States
- Coordinates: 43°05′14″N 75°15′10″W

District information
- Type: Public
- Motto: Excellence, Diversity, Achievement
- Grades: Kindergarten through 12
- Schools: Elementary 10; Middle 2 High 1
- Budget: $204,516,000 (2018-2019)
- NCES District ID: 3629370.
- District ID: NY-412300010000

Students and staff
- Students: 9,679 (2020-2021)
- Teachers: 692.52
- Student–teacher ratio: 14:1
- District mascot: Raiders
- Colors: Red, Black, White and Silver

Other information
- Schedule: M-F except state holidays
- Website: Official website

The Utica City School District is a public school district with boundaries coterminous with those of the city of Utica, New York, United States. It is a highly diverse urban district, having 69% racial minority students and 17% students who are English language learners in 2017. It is part of Oneida-Herkimer-Madison BOCES and the Conference of Big 5 School Districts, a conference of the largest urban school districts in New York State.

== History ==
In 2010, the two Utica schools Proctor High School and Donovan Middle School were evaluated for restructuring by the state Department of Education in response to consistent underperformance.

The Utica City School District was party to the case Maisto v. State of New York, also called the "small cities" case, with seven other districts in the state. This suit alleged that the state's Foundation Aid formula, which was initiated in 2007 but frozen in the 2009–10 legislative session and cut in the 2010–2011 session, did not provide adequate funding to provide a basic education to students in these districts. In 2021, on appeal, the Supreme Court of New York ordered the state to revise its funding to adequately provide for these districts. State aid accounted for about 80% of the Utica City School District budget in 2021.

In 2013 the Utica Academy of Science charter school, run by the same group as the Syracuse Academy of Science, was established. The UAS diverted a few million dollars in state funding from UCSD's budget. A second charter school was denied permission, due in part to concerns over further reducing the UCSD budget.

In 2016, the border between the Utica City School District and New Hartford Central School District was identified by the non-profit EdBuild as the 12th most segregating school district border in the United States.

In December 2022, superintendent Bruce Karam was placed on administrative leave by the Board of Education following complaints from two district employees. Karam was appointed superintendent in 2011. A legal battle between Karam and the board followed. On November 21, 2023, Karam was indicted by a grand jury on five charges of grand larceny and corruption. Louis LaPolla, who was mayor of Utica from 1984 to 1995 and president of the school board from 2018 to 2022, was also indicted. Karam was accused of using district resources to mail campaign literature in support of his favored school board candidates, as well as invitations to a fundraiser for a scholarship fund run by LaPolla. LaPolla also faces federal mail fraud charges alleging he stole $38,000 intended for the scholarship fund. On November 27, the school board voted to immediately terminate Karam's employment. LaPolla accepted a plea deal, and pled guilty to petty larceny on February 22, 2024. Karam pled guilty to charges of public corruption on March 8, and was sentenced to pay restitution and a reduction of his pension benefits.

Christopher Spence, who had previously been superintendent of the Fall Mountain Regional School District in New Hampshire, began as superintendent on August 5, 2024. In May 2026, Spence announced that he had not received an extension of his contract. Spence began an extended administrative leave in June. In July, his attorney stated that they had filed a complaint with the New York State Division of Human Rights, alleging discrimination and retaliation by the school board. On July 21, the board resolved that it would not renew Spence's contract when it expires in 2027. On August 4, the board released a statement saying that they had reached an agreement with Spence, and his last day would be September 4, 2026. The agreement resolved any ongoing legal matters and compensated Spence $244,472.36, which is the salary he would have earned between his contract end date and his last day under the agreement. Neither party admitted to wrongdoing.

=== Refugee student lawsuit ===
In 2015, the Utica City School District was the subject of two lawsuits pertaining to its treatment of refugee students. Both suits were the result of a statewide review of compliance with Plyler v. Doe, which prevents schools from asking about the immigration status of students. The first suit was filed by the New York Civil Liberties Union on behalf of six refugee students, and the second by the Attorney General of New York. Both suits alleged that refugee students older than 16 who were perceived to have poor language skills were denied enrollment at Proctor High School. They were instead diverted into weaker alternative programs that focused solely on English as a foreign language and did not lead to a diploma or adequately prepare for a high school equivalency exam. Students in these programs were allegedly segregated from other students and not allowed to mix with their peers for lunch or extracurricular activities.

These suits were settled in 2016. For the first suit, the district agreed to reach out to individual school-age refugees as well as refugee communities in Utica to notify them of their right to attend school. For the second suit, the district was required to revise its enrollment policies and hire internal and external compliance monitors. It also required the district to offer compensatory schooling for students whose admission was denied or delayed, and to raise the standards of future alternative programs. The district did not admit wrongdoing as part of the settlements.

Although Utica was the only district sued as a result of the state's review, a similar lawsuit was filed against the School District of Lancaster, Pennsylvania later in 2015, and similar incidents were reported elsewhere in the state and country.

== Schools ==
=== Elementary ===
There are ten elementary schools in the district: Albany, Columbus, Conkling, General Herkimer, Hughes, Jefferson, Jones, Kernan, MLK (built in 1955 and dedicated on April 19, 1956), and Watson Williams (built in 1992).

=== Middle ===
The district's two middle schools are James H. Donovan Middle School, named for New York State Senator James H. Donovan, and John F. Kennedy Middle School (opened on September 8, 1965 and dedicated on December 1, 1965), named after the former president.

=== High school ===
Constructed in 1934 as a Works Progress Administration project, Thomas R. Proctor High School is the district's only high school, with 200 full-time teachers and 2,600 students. Utica Free Academy closed in 1990.

== See also ==
- Notre Dame Junior Senior High School (Utica, New York), a private school in Utica
- List of school districts in New York
