= Theodore S. Sayre =

American businessman and politician (1837–1916)

Theodore Sheldon Sayre
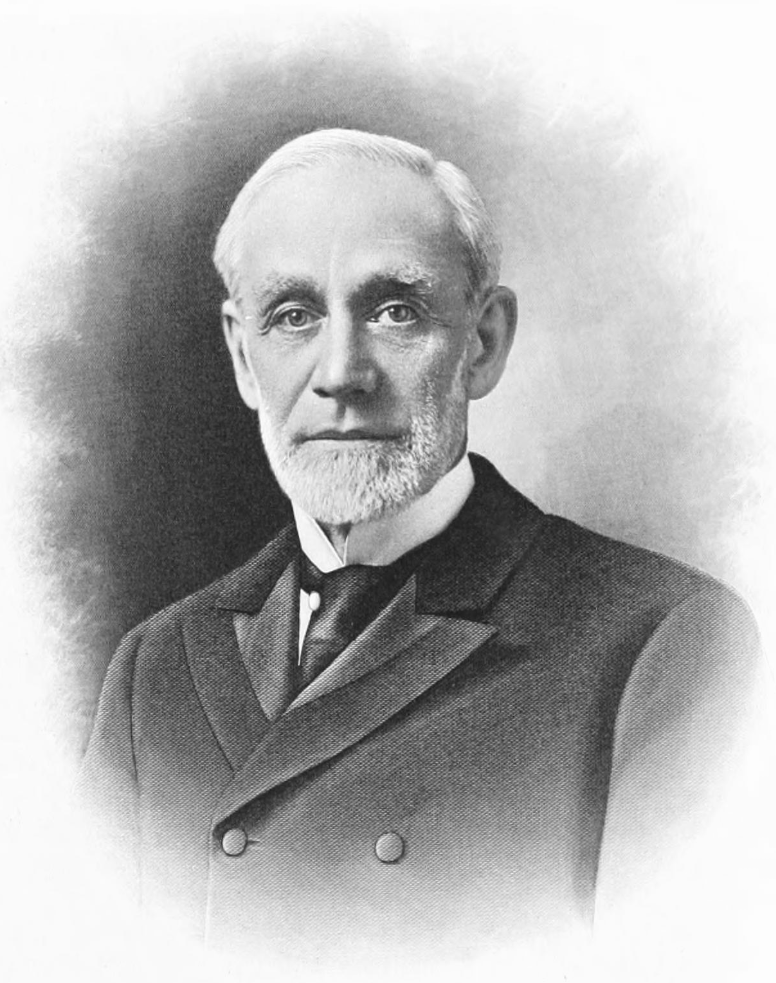

Member of the New York Senate from the 19th district
- In office 1876

Mayor of Utica
- In office 1874–1875

Personal details
- Born: April 25, 1837 Utica, New York, U.S.
- Died: December 5, 1916 (aged 69) Utica, New York, U.S.
- Resting place: Forest Hill Cemetery; Utica, New York, U.S.
- Party: Republican
- Occupation: Businessman; politician

Theodore Sheldon Sayre (April 25, 1837 – December 5, 1916) was an American businessman and politician from New York. He was very involved in religious and civic activities in Utica, New York.

== Early life ==
Sayre was born on April 25, 1837, in Utica, New York, the son of businessman James Sayre and Amelia Margaret Van Ranst.

Sayre attended school in Utica and went to the Delancey Institute in Westmoreland. He left school when he was 18 to work as a clerk in his father's hardware store.

== Career ==
In 1859, Sayre was admitted a partner in his father's business. After his father died in 1877, he conducted the business with his brother Charles H. until 1879, when he retired from the partnership. He was a trustee and first vice president of the Savings Bank of Utica and a director of the Utica & Black River Railroad, the Utica-Willowvale Bleachery, and the Oneida National Bank. He was also a director of the City Water Works Company and served on the advisory committee of the Orphan Asylum. In 1863, he was elected alderman of the Third Ward and served as alderman for six years.

In March 1874, Sayre was elected Mayor of Utica. In his first week as mayor, the Common Council fired firefighter chief engineer Wesley Dimbleby and replaced him with William J. Supple for political reasons. While this wasn't unusual for the time, Dimbleby was widely respected and dozens of firefighters quit in protest over the move. Sayre previously supported separating the police and fire departments from politics, and as mayor he circulated a petition to the State Legislature to establish a Police and Fire Commission independent of the Common Council. The Legislature created the commission, and in May 1874 the commission hired a number of new police officers and established a paid fire department instead of a volunteer one. Dimbleby was appointed chief of the new fire department. Sayre himself was a volunteer firefighter for years and served as treasurer of the Firemen's Benevolent Association. As mayor, he also built a new public school, paved Bagg's Square, and built a bridge over the Mohawk River. He lost his re-election campaign in March 1875.

In 1875, Sayre was elected to the New York State Senate as a Republican, representing New York's 19th State Senate district (Oneida County). He served in the Senate in 1876 and 1877. He was then appointed to fill a vacancy in the Board of Police and Fire Commissioners. In 1886, he was re-appointed for a full term. He also served as a Civil Service Commissioner.

Sayre was president of the Utica Bible Club (which furnished Bibles for every room in every hotel in the city), a charter member of the Fort Schuyler Club, and a member of the Utica Mechanics Association, the Utica Art Association, the Prevention of Cruelty to Children and the Oneida County Historical Society (later the Oneida County History Center). He was initially a member of the West Utica Presbyterian Church, although he bought land for a new church he built and furnished as a memorial to his parents. The church was dedicated in 1884 and was initially known as the Memorial Presbyterian Church, although in 1921 it was renamed the Sayre Memorial Presbyterian Church.

== Personal life ==
Sayre never married. Sayre died at his home in Utica on December 5, 1916. He was buried in Forest Hill Cemetery.

New York State Senate
Preceded by Samuel S. Lowery	New York State Senate; 19th District; 1876–1877	Succeeded by Alexander T. Goodwin
