= Edward Hanna =

Edward Hanna may refer to:

- Edward Joseph Hanna (1860–1944), archbishop of San Francisco from 1915 to 1935
- Edward A. Hanna (1922–2009), former mayor of Utica, New York
