= Richard Hanna (New York politician) =

American politician (1951–2020)

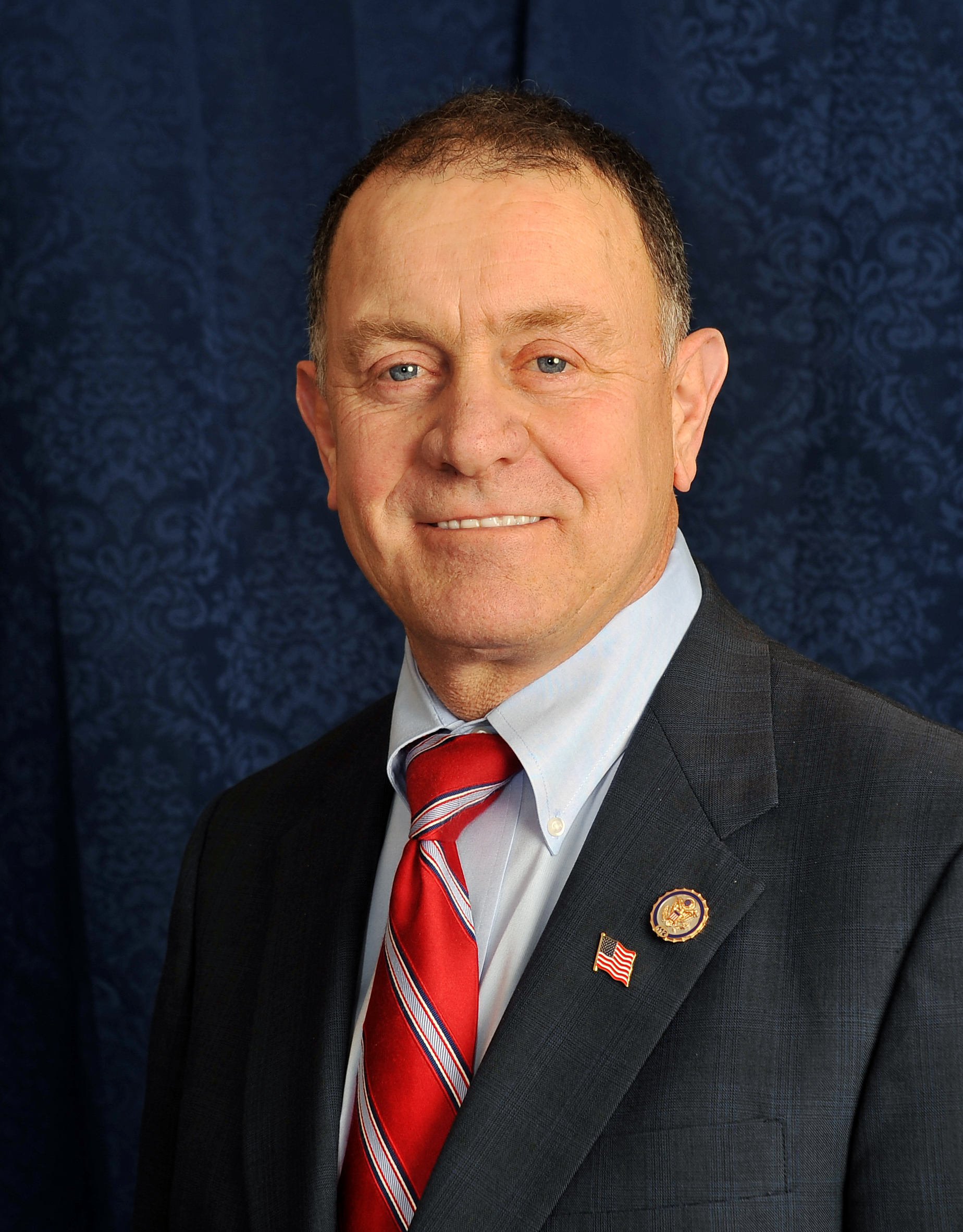

Member of the U.S. House of Representatives from New York
- In office January 3, 2011 – January 3, 2017
- Preceded by: Mike Arcuri
- Succeeded by: Claudia Tenney
- Constituency: 24th district (2011–2013); 22nd district (2013–2017)

Personal details
- Born: Richard Louis Hanna; January 25, 1951 Utica, New York, U.S.
- Died: March 15, 2020 (aged 69) Oneida County, New York, U.S.
- Party: Republican
- Spouse: Kimberly Greenleaf (m. 2001)
- Children: 2
- Relatives: Edward A. Hanna (uncle)
- Education: Reed College (BA)

Richard Louis Hanna (January 25, 1951 – March 15, 2020) was an American politician who served as a U.S. representative from New York from 2011 to 2017. A member of the Republican Party, his district was numbered the 24th during his first term in Congress; from 2013 to 2017, it was numbered as the 22nd district.

== Early life, education and business career ==
Hanna was born in Utica and raised in Marcy. His grandparents owned a dairy farm in Herkimer County. He graduated from Whitesboro High School in Marcy. Then, he graduated from Reed College with a bachelor's degree in Economics and Political Science. After college, Hanna returned to New York to start his own construction business called Hanna Construction. Hanna was of Lebanese descent.

== U.S. House of Representatives ==
=== Elections ===
==== 2008 ====
In 2008, Hanna ran against incumbent Democrat Mike Arcuri and narrowly lost.

==== 2010 ====
In 2010, he ran in a rematch and won.

==== 2012 ====
Due to redistricting, Hanna ran in the new 22nd district in 2012.

In his 2012 campaign for re-election against Democrat Dan Lamb, television stations WUTR in Utica and WSYR in Syracuse announced they would jointly air a debate between Hanna and Lamb. Hanna declined to participate, citing another scheduled televised debate and five that would not be televised. The stations said that if Hanna did not appear, they would air a 30-minute question-and-answer session with Lamb. According to Steve Merren, the vice president and general manager of WUTR's parent company, Nexstar Broadcasting Group, Hanna then contacted Merren. In an email to staff, Merren stated, "He indicated to me that we would not be considered for his ad dollars and our level of cooperation in the future could be affected." Merren then directed that WUTR not go ahead with the broadcast. Both Merren and a Hanna spokeswoman denied that threats had been made. After the inadvertent disclosure of the internal email, Merren told the press that Hanna "did not say he would pull his ad dollars." The Hanna campaign said that his conversation with Merren had been "nothing more than a courtesy call". The Lamb campaign said that Hanna was "using his money to influence the journalistic decisions of a local news agency."

==== 2014 ====
In 2014, Hanna received a primary challenge from a considerably more conservative Republican, State Assemblywoman Claudia Tenney. Described as a "Tea Party favorite," Tenney reportedly challenged Hanna because "she believed he had abandoned his conservative principles during two terms in Congress. Tenney called Hanna a RINO (Republican in Name Only) who had become the third-most liberal Republican in the House of Representatives, based on his voting record." Hanna defeated Tenney by a margin of 53% to 47%; when asked about the message sent by his win, he said, "I hope it's a message that you could be thoughtful and inclusive and still be elected." Hanna went on to win re-election in November, when he had no Democratic challenger.

=== Tenure ===
Hanna was a member of the conservative Republican Study Committee and the centrist Republican Main Street Partnership. He was a member of the LGBT Equality Caucus. Hanna stated his opposition to the Patient Protection and Affordable Care Act. He was one of only six House Republicans in the 112th Congress who did not sign Grover Norquist's "Taxpayer Protection Pledge," with a spokesman explaining that "Rep. Hanna is focusing on the pledges he has made to his wife, the Constitution of the United States and the people of upstate New York."

According to the Washington Post's congressional votes database, Hanna voted with the House Republicans 85% of the time in his first year in office; only 11 Republicans (out of 244) had a lower percentage at the time. Hanna was ranked as the 2nd most bipartisan member of the U.S. House of Representatives during the 114th United States Congress (after Peter T. King) in The Lugar Center and McCourt School of Public Policy's Bipartisan Index.

In February 2011, Hanna published an op-ed opposing the extension of the USA PATRIOT Act. Editors from the Syracuse Post-Standard, which published the piece, later reprimanded Hanna for plagiarizing content from a report by Julian Sanchez of the Cato Institute in his editorial. Sanchez indicated that Hanna had his permission to use the content, although he was not referenced in the piece.

The first bill Hanna co-sponsored was H.R. 4 which repealed the 1099 tax reporting provision of the Patient Protection and Affordable Care Act. President Obama signed the bill into law in April 2011. In early 2011 Congressman Hanna voted to repeal health care reform. Hanna voted to support the Energy Tax Prevention Act which would prevent the Environmental Protection Agency from regulating greenhouse gasses and implementing a "cap-and-trade" system through regulation. Hanna voted against cuts to NPR and Planned Parenthood. Hanna voted in favor of a Balanced Budget Amendment to the Constitution.

At a rally in support of the Equal Rights Amendment in March 2012, Hanna urged women to donate to Democratic candidates, saying: "I think these are very precarious times for women, it seems. So many of your rights are under assault... Contribute your money to people who speak out on your behalf, because the other side -- my side -- has a lot of it."

In the 2012 presidential election, he endorsed former Utah Governor Jon Huntsman Jr.

Hanna supported reauthorization of the Violence Against Women Act.

In 2013, he supported same-sex marriage, becoming the second Republican member of the House to do so (the first being Ileana Ros-Lehtinen).

In June 2013, Hanna was the only Republican congressman to vote against proposed legislation to ban abortions after 20 weeks of pregnancy except for victims of rape or incest who have reported the crime to authorities. He opposes partial birth abortions, but stated that he was unable to support this legislation because it would cast aside exception for the health of the mother, and it fails to adequately account for unique circumstances that can arise after 20 weeks because every pregnancy is specific.

In December 2015, Hanna—citing family responsibilities—announced that he did not plan to run for re-election in 2016. Hanna indicated that a potential primary rematch with Claudia Tenney did not influence his decision not to seek re-election. He endorsed businessman Steve Wells as his successor, but Wells lost the primary to Tenney, who won the seat in the general election.

On August 2, 2016, Hanna became the first sitting Republican member of Congress to say that he would vote for Hillary Clinton for president over Donald Trump in the 2016 presidential election, referring to the Republican nominee as "a national embarrassment".

In December 2016, Hanna said in an interview that the Republican Party had "gone to the far extremes on social issues. They've become judgmental and sanctimonious and authoritarian on their approach to people."

In 2018, Hanna and former congressman Sherwood Boehlert endorsed Tenney's Democratic challenger Anthony Brindisi, who went on to win the election.

=== Committee assignments ===
- Committee on Education and the Workforce
  - Subcommittee on Early Childhood, Elementary and Secondary Education
  - Subcommittee on Higher Education and Workforce Training
- Committee on Transportation and Infrastructure
  - Subcommittee on Economic Development, Public Buildings and Emergency Management
  - Subcommittee on Highways and Transit (Vice Chair)
  - Subcommittee on Railroads, Pipelines, and Hazardous Materials

United States House Transportation Subcommittee on Water Resources and Environment

- Committee on Small Business

=== Caucus memberships ===
- United States Congressional International Conservation Caucus

== Personal life and death ==
Hanna lived in Barneveld, New York. He married Kimberly Greenleaf in 2001; they had two children. He died from cancer at a hospital in Oneida County, New York on March 15, 2020, aged 69.

Hanna was the nephew of Utica mayor Edward A. Hanna.

== See also ==
- List of Arab and Middle-Eastern Americans in the United States Congress

U.S. House of Representatives
Preceded by Mike Arcuri	Member of the U.S. House of Representatives from New York's 24th congressional district 2011–2013	Succeeded by Dan Maffei
Preceded by Maurice Hinchey	Member of the U.S. House of Representatives from New York's 22nd congressional district 2013–2017	Succeeded by Claudia Tenney
