= Duquesne Club =

Social club in Pittsburgh, Pennsylvania

Coordinates: 40.441933°N 79.998592°W

The Duquesne Club
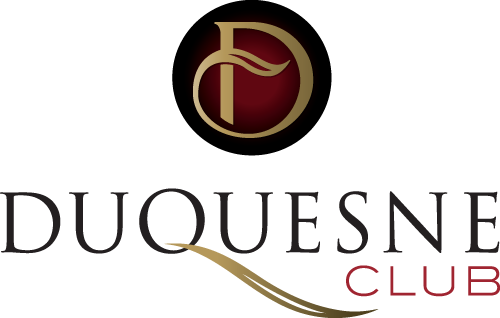
- Formation: 1873 (153 years ago)
- Type: City club
- Location(s): 325 Sixth Avenue; Pittsburgh, Pennsylvania, USA
- Members: ≈2,700 (men and women)
- General Manager: Scott Neill, CCM
- Website: www.duquesne.org

Pittsburgh Landmark – PHLF
- Designated: 1976

The Duquesne Club is a private social club in Downtown Pittsburgh, Pennsylvania. Since its founding in 1873, it has functioned as one of the most exclusive social clubs in the world, and as a meeting place for businessmen, civic leaders, politicians, and royalty around the world.

== History ==
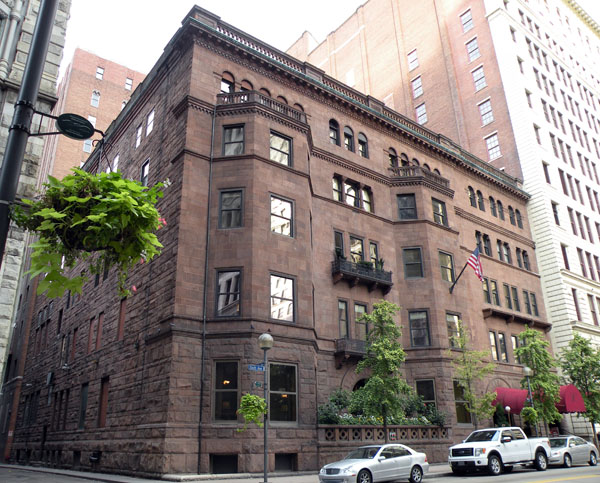
Duquesne Club Building, built in 1887

The Duquesne Club was founded in 1873. Its first president was John H. Ricketson. The club's present home, a Romanesque structure designed by Longfellow, Alden & Harlow on Sixth Avenue in downtown Pittsburgh, was opened in 1890; an addition designed by Janssen & Cocken that included a garden patio, barbershop, and new kitchens was constructed in 1931. The building achieved landmark status from the Pittsburgh History and Landmarks Foundation in 1976, and was added to the National Register of Historic Places in 1995.

The Club voted to admit women for the first time in its history in 1980. A health-and-fitness center was added in 1994, and the club was ranked as #1 City Club in America in 1997, an honor that would be repeated in 2001, 2003, and 2006.

The Duquesne Club operates under 501(c)(7) Social and Recreation Clubs designation since ruling year 1945. In 2025 it claimed total revenue of $12,358,558, total expenses of $11,762,437, and total assets of $33,539,399. The separate Duquesne Club Charitable Foundation is a 501(c)(3) Public Charity since 2002 devoted to historic preservation of the clubhouse and its contents, especially artworks. In 2025 it reported total assets of $701,401 and total revenue of $24,842.

== Notable guests ==
Among notable guests to the club are U.S. Presidents Ulysses S. Grant, Herbert Hoover, Gerald Ford, Ronald Reagan, George H. W. Bush and Bill Clinton as well as Colin Powell, Polish leader Edward Gierek,, King Charles III (while he was Prince of Wales) and former Pakistan Prime Minister Benazir Bhutto. Oil businessman and millionaire Philip M. Shannon owned an apartment in the club and died there in 1915.

== Membership ==
As of 2007, membership at the Duquesne Club consisted of about 2,700 men and women. Though the Club does not discriminate in its selection of members, membership is by invitation from an existing member only.

== See also ==
- List of American gentlemen's clubs
- Economic Club of Pittsburgh
- Allegheny HYP Club
- Greater Pittsburgh Chamber of Commerce
