= Economic Club of Pittsburgh =

Educational organization

- Formation: 1910 (116 years ago)
- Type: Economic club
- Board President: Risa Kumazawa
- Website: www.econclubpgh.com

The Economic Club of Pittsburgh is a non-profit, non-partisan educational organization based in Pittsburgh, Pennsylvania, United States since 1910. It is among the oldest and largest organizations of its type in the U.S. providing a distinguished public forum for intelligent, timely discussions of economic matter of regional, national, and international importance and their interaction with both the social and political environment. The club has attracted nationally and internationally known speakers for the regular meetings for open discussions between speakers and members. It is organized as a 501(c)(3) Public Charity.

The club hosts monthly networking luncheons from September to June with speakers from the worlds of business, finance, government and academia. Each January the club hosts the Annual Forecast Luncheon with Duquesne University's School of Business Alumni Association, Pittsburgh Association of Financial Professionals and Risk Management Association as co-sponsors. The forecast luncheon hosts a panel of respected economists in national, regional and financial marketplaces.

== National politics ==
On October 26, 1976 President Ford addressed the Club at the Pittsburgh Hilton. On September 25, 2024 Vice President Kamala Harris addressed the Club at Carnegie Mellon University in as part of her presidential campaign.

== See also ==
- Duquesne Club
- Greater Pittsburgh Chamber of Commerce
- Allegheny HYP Club
