= James K. O'Connor =

American politician and judge (1864–1922)

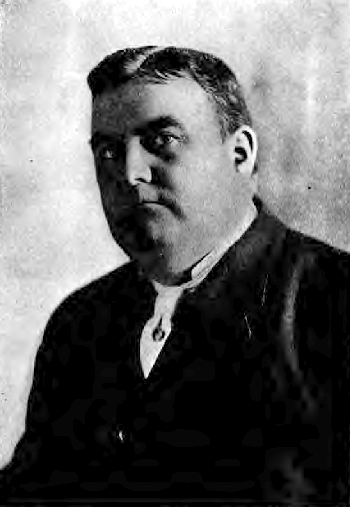

Mayor of Utica, New York
- In office 1920–1922

Member of the New York State Assembly from the Oneida's 1st district
- In office January 1, 1890 – December 31, 1890

Personal details
- Party: Democratic
- Occupation: Lawyer

James Keegan O'Connor (1864–1922) was an Irish-American judge and Democrat politician from Utica, New York.

O'Connor graduated from Utica Free Academy and studied law at a local law office. He served in the New York State Assembly during the 113th New York State Legislature, but was not reelected. He was elected as a Utica city judge in 1899, and reelected in 1903. He was a founder of the New York State Magistrates Association and served as its president in 1912. He was the Mayor of Utica, New York from 1920 to 1922. He died in 1922.

He had a reputation as a supporter of all immigrants in Utica, who at the time accounted for around a third of its population. The shooting of Italian mill workers by city police during a 1919 textile worker's strike likely played a role in the defeat of the incumbent mayor. A staunch Irish nationalist, he publicly spoke in favor of armed revolution against English rule in Ireland, and in the years before World War I called for an alliance between Ireland and Germany against England.

O'Connor was known as an orator and writer. His collected speeches and writings were published in 1913.

New York State Assembly
Preceded by Joseph Harry Kent	New York State Assembly; Oneida County, 1st District; 1890	Succeeded by Cornelius Haley
