= Richard Benedetto =

American journalist

Richard Benedetto is a retired USA Today political reporter and columnist who is currently an adjunct professor in the School of Public Affairs and the School of Communication at The American University in Washington, D.C. He also teaches in The Fund For American Studies Program at George Mason University. He is founding member of the USA Today staff, wrote the first Page One cover story for that newspaper in 1982, and spent many years as its White House correspondent.

== Early life and education ==
Benedetto is a native of Utica, New York and a graduate of the Thomas R. Proctor High School. He holds a 1965 B.A. from Utica College of Syracuse University and a 1971 M.A. from Syracuse University's S. I. Newhouse School of Public Communications in newspaper journalism. He also holds an honorary doctorate from Syracuse University.

== Career ==
He began his news reporting career in 1966 with The Buffalo (N.Y.) Evening News. He also was a city government reporter and columnist with the Utica (N.Y.) Daily Press and the Utica (N.Y.) Observer Dispatch. He went on to become a state government reporter for the Gannett News Service in its State Capital Bureau, in Albany, New York.

In 1982, he joined the start-up team of USA Today in Washington, D.C., covering the presidential administrations of Presidents Ronald Reagan, George H. W. Bush, Bill Clinton, and George W. Bush. He retired from USA Today in 2006. Upon his retirement he began teaching at American University and in The Fund For American Studies program - first at Georgetown University and later at George Mason University.

He is the author of two books, Politicians Are People, Too (2006) and Around And About (2019).

Benedetto was inducted as a Living Legend into the Oneida County Historical Hall of Fame in 2017.
