= Barbara McNees =

Chamber of Commerce director in Pittsburgh

Barbara Bateman McNees
- Born: c. 1940s
- Education: Geneva College (Bachelor of Arts)
- Occupations: American business and civic affairs leader
- Employer: Greater Pittsburgh Chamber of Commerce (retired)
- Spouse: William McNees
- Relatives: Two children

Barbara Bateman McNees (born c. 1947) is an American business and civic affairs leader. The former executive director of the Greater Pittsburgh Chamber of Commerce, she was the first female president of the organization. She also chaired the Intergovernmental Cooperation Authority in Pittsburgh, Pennsylvania, and was a member of the board of trustees of Robert Morris University.

== Formative years and family ==
A resident of the Greater Pittsburgh area as a child, McNees was the daughter of a mill worker. She earned a certificate from the Tobe Coburn School of Fashion in New York, and was awarded a Bachelor of Arts degree by Geneva College.

In addition, she was awarded certificates by the Institute for Organizational Management at the University of Delaware in Dover, Delaware and the National Development Council in Washington, D.C.

During the 1990s, she lived near the Connoquenessing Creek outside of Ellwood City, and is the mother of two children.

== Career ==
Employed by Macy's in New York as a manager from 1966 to 1967, McNees worked for the international department of the Maryland National Bank in Baltimore (now part of MBNA) from 1968 to 1969. A sales associate with Athes and Hanna Group Realtors Inc. in Salisbury, Maryland from 1975 to 1980, she also launched and operated the Professional Employment Agency in that community from 1978 to 1980.

A member of the Beaver County Chamber of Commerce, she served as the organization's executive vice president from 1981 to 1988. Membership in the organization doubled during her tenure.

Appointed to the Governor's Action Team in the Commonwealth of Pennsylvania, she consulted with agency officials from twelve county development offices to explore ways to recruit new businesses to the region she represented and retain the businesses that already existed there. She served in that capacity from 1988 to 1996.

McNees was then hired as executive director of the Greater Pittsburgh Chamber of Commerce. Appointed in 1996, she retired on August 15, 2013, having served as the first female president of the organization.

In 1997, she led community outreach efforts by the Pittsburgh Chamber of Commerce to persuade voters to support passage of the Regional Renaissance Initiative, a proposed sales tax increase for eleven counties to generate funding for economic development projects in the region; however, voters failed to approve the ballot measure, which had also had the support of the Community Alliance for Economic Development and jobs, Pittsburgh Steelers coach Al Crowther and Sam Katz of EnterSport Advisors in Bala Cynwyd, who said the funding generated by the measure's passage would have helped to rehabilitate sports stadiums statewide. Supporters of the measure also stated that the funding raised by the sales tax would have been used to improve Pittsburgh's cultural district and downtown areas. Later that same year, she was elected to the board of directors of the Urban League of Greater Pittsburgh for a term of three years.

In 1998, while serving as executive director of Pittsburgh's Chamber of Commerce, McNees managed a staff of ten employees who oversaw interactions with more than three thousand members. Her budget was $1.2 million that year.

A member of the board of trustees at Robert Morris University in 2012, she delivered the address to graduating seniors at that year's commencement ceremony.

== Legacy ==
She helped to develop the Barbara McNees Spirit of ATHENA Scholarship and the ATHENA Young Professional Award for emerging female leaders.
