= Edward A. Hanna =

American businessman and politician (1922–2009)

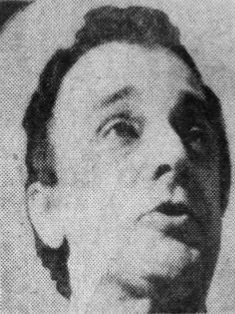
- Hanna in 1975

75th & 78th Mayor of Utica
- In office 1996–2000
- Preceded by: Louis D. LaPolla
- Succeeded by: Timothy J. Julian
- In office 1974–1978
- Preceded by: Michael Caruso
- Succeeded by: Stephen J. Pawlinga

Member of the New York State Assembly from the 130th district
- In office January 1, 1966 – December 31, 1966

Personal details
- Born: April 7, 1922 Utica, New York, U.S.
- Died: March 13, 2009 (aged 86) Fayetteville, New York, U.S.
- Party: Democratic (1955–1973, 1991–2007)
- Other political affiliations: Independent (1973–1991, 2007–2009)
- Spouse: Ellen Eichler (m. 1947)
- Children: 2
- Relatives: Richard Hanna (nephew)
- Occupation: Politician; businessman

Military service
- Branch/service: United States Marine Corps
- Rank: Sergeant
- Battles/wars: World War II
- Awards: Purple Heart

Edward Arnold Hanna (April 7, 1922 – March 13, 2009) was an American businessman and politician. He was mayor of Utica, New York, from 1974 to 1978 and from 1996 to 2000, running as an independent. Often described as a populist, Hanna was widely regarded as eccentric and abrasive and constantly clashed with the Utica business and political establishment, the rest of city government, and other local groups. A "non-stop talker" who The New York Times called "flamboyant, combative, and controversial", he once described Utica as "a stinking, rotten town" and "a lousy place to live" and told Uticans to move away for better opportunities. He built and renovated a number of parks and public artworks during his terms. However, Hanna failed to stem Utica's long-term economic and population decline.

== Early life ==
Edward Arnold Hanna was born in Utica, New York, to Lebanese immigrants Anthony and Sophie Hanna on April 7, 1922. He left Utica Free Academy during his sophomore year to enlist with the United States Marine Corps during World War II. He reached the rank of sergeant and received the Purple Heart for a gunshot wound received fighting on Guam. After returning home Hanna married and had two sons. He started a series of manufacturing and distribution businesses. He developed an improved photographic developer that was popular worldwide, which led to him becoming wealthy and a role as a consultant for Eastman Kodak.

Through the 1950s, the local Democratic party was led by Rufus Elefante, a political boss who was largely at the center of Utica's widespread corruption. In 1955, in recognition of Hanna's support, Elefante and other Democratic leaders recommended that governor Averell Harriman appoint Hanna to the Central New York State Parks Commission. The post was non-paying and largely ceremonial, but Hanna took it upon himself to inspect state parks. He found that the children of politicians and party leaders were often employed in paying summer jobs that they never actually reported to. Hanna called for an inquiry into the state parks system; instead, a State Council of Parks subcommittee said Hanna was unfit to serve and asked the governor to remove him. Hanna continued to escalate, eventually calling for Robert Moses to be dismissed as chairman of the State Council of Parks and for the Central New York State Parks Commission to be replaced. Hanna's fight was covered by The New York Times. The state and local Democratic party saw Hanna's actions as a black eye, putting him out of their good graces: he was not reappointed as a parks commissioner in 1956.

Local Democratic leadership attempted to convince Hanna to run for Congress in 1956, setting him up to lose against the Republican incumbent William R. Williams: he instead ran for the New York State Assembly, where he lost in the Democratic primary. Hanna was city parks commissioner from 1958 to 1960, where he was one of the few city officials not implicated in organized crime and prostitution scandals. Later, he successfully ran for the assembly in 1965, joining the 176th New York State Legislature. He advocated for the elimination of the assembly, making New York a unicameral legislature. He also called for Elefante to resign from politics and asked Senator Robert F. Kennedy to help reorganize the Democratic party in Oneida County. The Democratic Party did not support his reelection campaign, and he only served one year. In 1972 he ran in the Democratic primary for the Assembly seat and lost.

== Mayorship from 1974 to 1978 ==
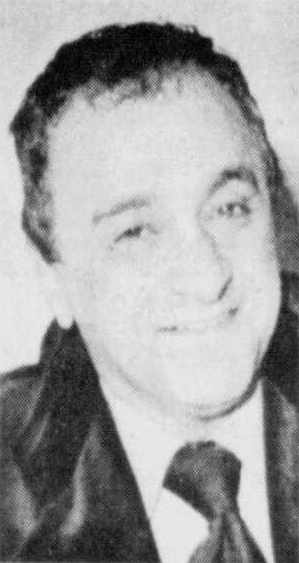
Hanna in 1976

In 1973, Hanna ran as an independent in the race for Mayor of Utica and won a narrow victory against Republican incumbent Michael Caruso and a Democratic challenger. Hanna had pledged to eliminate 200 city jobs and cut city spending: at the time, Utica had the fourth-highest taxes in New York and second-highest unemployment. As both his opponents were Italian Americans, vote-splitting in Utica's large Italian population played a role in his win. He was reelected in 1975 with a majority of the vote.

In his first year, Hanna cut 225 positions and fired 15 city executives: he took on the management of five city departments himself. He also reformed city purchasing procedures, which had been subject to corruption and bribery. In late 1975, Hanna imposed a wage freeze for all city employees. In 1976, he reduced the Department of Public Works from 240 to 70 employees and introduced legislation to privatize the remaining employees. This was met with complaints from the public about insufficient snow removal and street repair, as well as legal action from the Teamsters.

Hanna removed the door from the mayor's office as a show of openness (although it was replaced a few months later) and invited Uticans to visit City Hall and inspect city files and correspondence at will. He had a sign hung in City Hall that said "This City Government Belongs to the People" and told staff to answer the phone, "People's Government". Hanna initially took only $1 as a salary, although he was later forced to take the entire amount. Hanna was reported to work more than 18-hour days, consuming mainly saltine crackers and milk. City meetings often jumped from topic to topic with no clear agenda. He wrote personal checks to cover city expenses so often that his wife started letting him take only three blank checks to work each day.

Hanna controlled City Hall tightly. Early in 1974 he ordered the city stamp machine be placed in his office and that all outgoing mail be brought to his office unsealed before mailing; this resulted in a blizzard of unsent mail in his office. He ordered that city telephone bills be reviewed for unauthorized long-distance charges, barred city employees from using public works garages for personal vehicles, and locked gas pumps in public works garages to prevent theft. Apparently prompted by a critical editorial after he called for the resignation of the entire Common Council, he barred city employees from speaking to Utica's two newspapers, the Utica Daily Press and Observer-Dispatch. He recommended the newspapers of Syracuse instead, saying they were less influenced by local politics. The ban did not apply to radio and TV news. Hanna later threatened to sue the papers. The ban was lifted and reinstated at times and was sometimes disregarded by city officials such as the comptroller and clerk, who were more independent of Hanna.

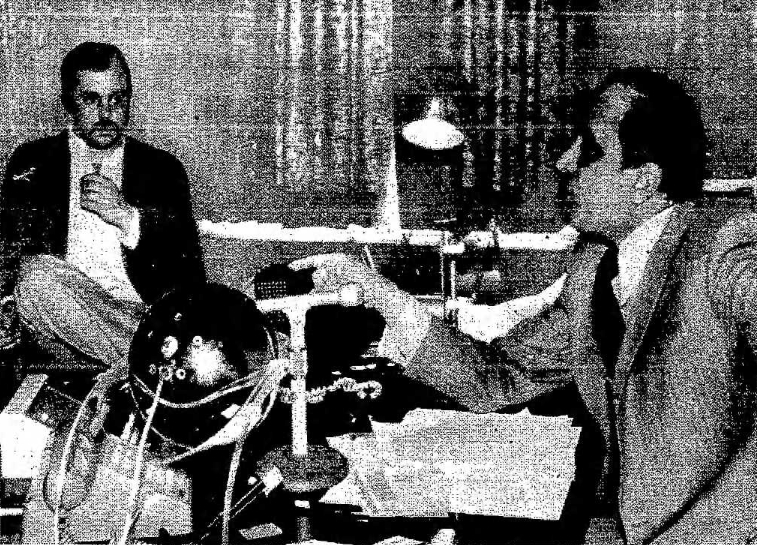
Hanna (right) and his son Paul Hanna (left) criticise the local Utica newspapers during a press conference, February 16, 1977

Hanna publicly railed against the Utica political and business establishment, sometimes during meetings on completely different topics. In a press conference he called Utica "a lousy place to live" and advised young Uticans to seek their fortunes elsewhere, blaming the local newspapers and chamber of commerce. At one time he telephoned the president of a company who stood in Hanna's way to call him "a pimple on my fanny". He was especially vitriolic whenever they interfered with his plans. When city bankers signed a joint letter opposing Hanna's plans for a hotel, Hanna withdrew the city's deposits and transferred them to a recently opened branch of Chase Manhattan. Relations between Hanna and the business community eased somewhat during his second term. Hanna also spoke out against labor unions, calling them "our nation's number one [...] villains" and blaming them for ruining New York City. Hanna fought with most other groups he saw as uncooperative as well, including the League of Women Voters and a community action group from the impoverished Corn Hill neighborhood.

Hanna's opponents accused him of egomania, instability, making misleading statements about budget matters, a lack of foresight and long-term plans, and an unwillingness to either listen or delegate: the business community in particular feared that his volatility would drive away investors. Some Utica businessmen questioned whether Hanna was at all an improvement over the status quo of widespread corruption that preceded him. A former editor of the Utica newspapers, Mason C. Taylor, joined Hanna's administration as an advisor but quit after two months: his letter of resignation criticized Hanna's autocratic and abusive governing style and expressed fears that city government could collapse badly enough that the state would need to step in. Initially Hanna repaired relations with Elefante, who served as an advisor, and he even proclaimed April 7 as "Rufus P. Elefante Day". However, Elefante resigned after seven months, stating that Hanna never took his advice. In 1975, the Oneida County Executive asked federal and county prosecutors to investigate Hanna for official misconduct. Utica's two Gannett papers returned Hanna's venom in kind: the editor of The Daily Press called him "some kind of emperor [...] allowing the peasants to enjoy the largesse of the sovereign". Although Hanna's opponents agreed that the tax cuts he implemented were long due, they said the cuts were accomplished in part by financial manipulation. However, many working-class Uticans admired Hanna's independence and unwillingness to take guff, as well as his willingness to try new things even if they did not work out.

Hanna's eccentric, impulsive actions produced further anecdotes. Within a single day, he hired one man to manage the Utica Memorial Auditorium, only to hire the same man into another role as director of the city bus company. He hired another man then fired him because he felt his salary was too high, writing a check to the city for the overage. He fired the entire Public Works department, then rehired them the next day. He let a teen rock band practice in City Hall's underground Civil Defense shelter, then wrote them a check for $1,000 when their instruments were stolen. In the summer of 1976, Hanna attempted to raise the age of a 9-year-old girl to 16 by proclamation so that she could work at a city park concession stand: this was rejected by the city's comptroller.

Hanna announced his candidacy for the 1976 United States Senate election in New York, stating that he could "do nothing more" for Utica, but he withdrew several weeks later. Hanna lost reelection in 1977.

=== Conflicts with police department ===
Hanna frequently clashed with the city police department. Shortly after the election and before his inauguration, Hanna convinced the Utica Common Council to reject a police contract that Caruso had negotiated the previous month that would have raised police salaries, and, due to a parity clause, those of firefighters as well. He alleged that Caruso was using the contract to garner votes from the police and fire departments. Hanna and the councilmen who voted against the contract received anonymous death threats and were placed under police surveillance.

One of Hanna's first acts was to order city policemen to salute citizens on the street, which they refused. In August of his first year, four youths in the Corn Hill neighborhood were arrested following a disturbance, and Hanna ordered them released. Three were released, but the arresting officer refused to release the fourth. When Chief Benny Rotundo backed the officer and complained that Hanna was interfering with police procedures, Hanna had Rotundo suspended.

In 1976, Hanna brought a locksmith to open Rotundo's office, saying that Rotundo was refusing to provide Hanna and city counsel with certain documents. Rotundo ordered Hanna and the locksmith arrested, although a city judge intervened on Hanna's behalf. Hanna suspended Rotundo again, along with four other officers involved in the arrest. Hanna also declared a state of emergency and asked for assistance from the New York National Guard. Rotundo maintained that Hanna was exceeding his authority in suspending him and his officers, and that the documents requested were confidential and could only be released under court order. Hanna appointed a new Commissioner of Public Safety that night: the chief was no more receptive to him than Hanna, and the Commissioner claimed that the chief and his officers removed documents through a window while he was there. Hanna said he received a threatening phone call from an officer later that night. Two days later, a State Supreme Court justice ordered that the chief and the suspended officers be reinstated, and ordered Hanna to return any documents he may have obtained from the chief's office.

=== Public projects ===
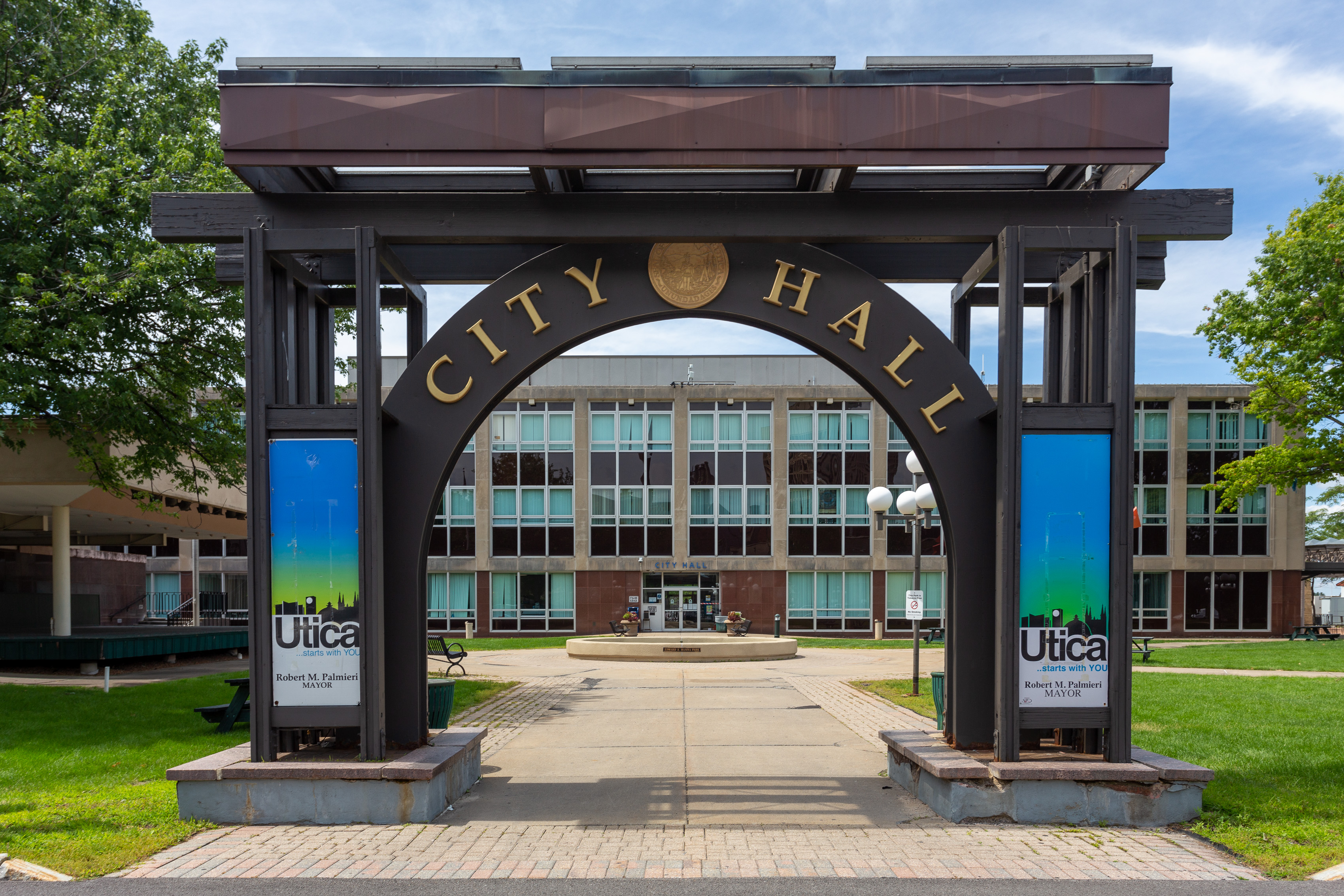
Entrance to Hanna Park in 2021, with bandstand to the left

Hanna Park, outside Utica City Hall, was built during his first term and named for him later. The park features a bandstand, where bands, paid by Hanna, played every night of the summer of '75 and '76. It also includes a small copy of the waterfall in New York City's Paley Park, as well as the "Tower of Hope", honoring the comedian Bob Hope. Hope had no connection to Utica before the tower was built, but did come to Utica and perform to inaugurate the tower. When Hanna held office, a carillon in the tower played his favorite song, "My Way", on the half-hour. As the bells could be heard at the Fort Schuyler Club, a club popular with Utica businessmen, Hanna may have done this to further annoy the Utica business community.

Hanna filled the lobby of City Hall with tables, chairs, and potted trees. He also included some furniture from his own collection including record players and music boxes. He stated that he wanted the lobby to be welcoming to the elderly, who he felt had been neglected by previous governments. During the Christmas season, Hanna obtained 80 hibachis for roasting chestnuts: the hibachis were paid using federal funds, but the chestnuts were purchased by Hanna.

Hanna's most ambitious project was "La Promenade", an urban renewal plan that would have converted downtown Utica into a European-style grand boulevard. Components of the plan included a replica of Rome's Spanish Steps and converting Union Station into an "Olympic Hall of Fame". Although Hanna obtained $2.6 million in federal funding and the plan was eventually approved by the city Common Council, the project was abandoned once Hanna left office.

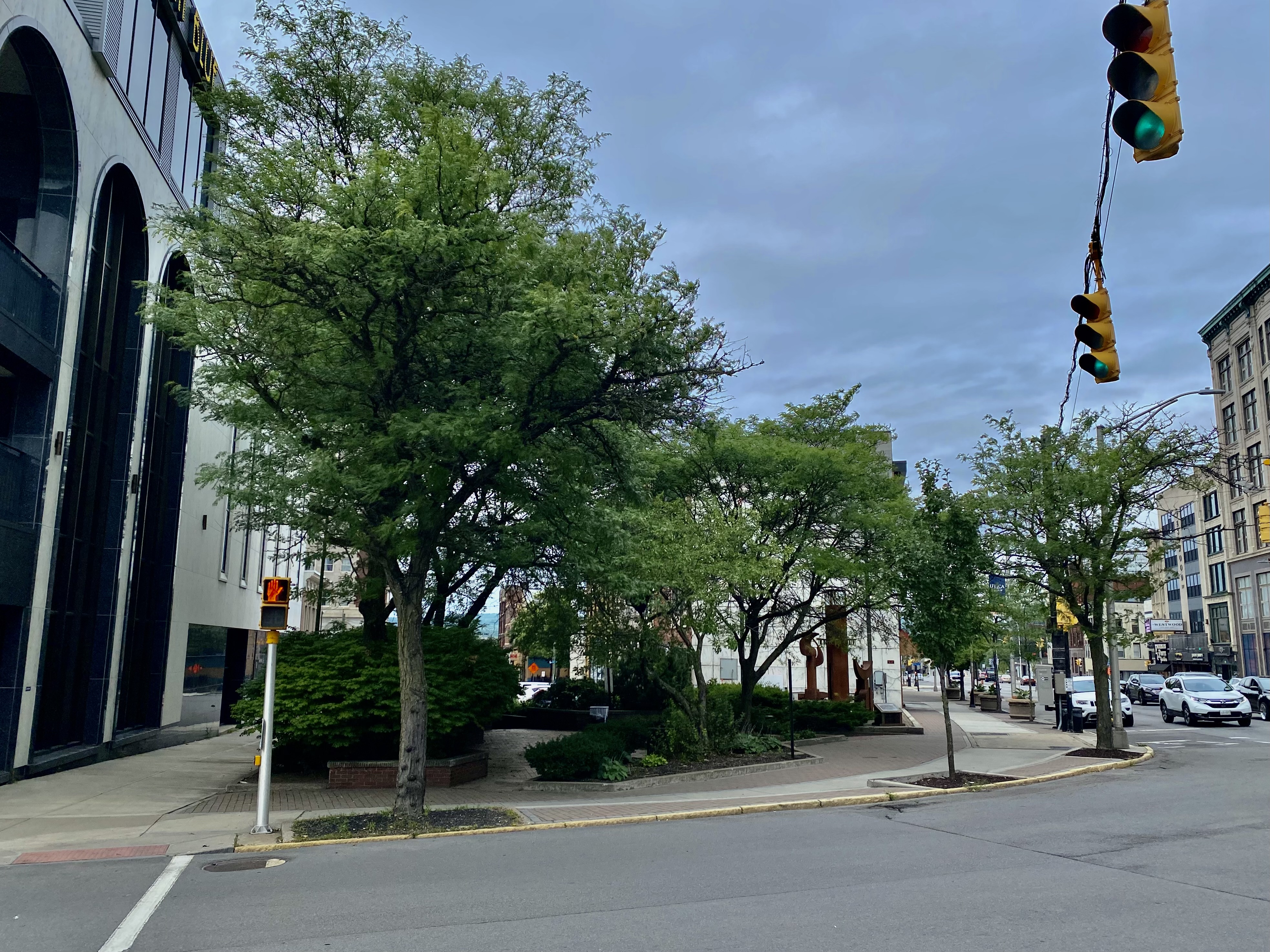
Ellen E. Hanna Mini-Park in Utica, named for Hanna's wife

Other works in Utica built during Hanna's first administration include:

- Ellen E. Hanna Mini-Park
- Nurses Park
- A giant sundial (now near NY 5S)
- A replica Liberty Bell (near NY 5S)
- A large metal sculpture of a United States flag (near NY 5S)

During Hanna's second administration, the following public works were produced:

- World's largest watering can (now at the Utica Zoo)

Hanna reopened a number of closed parks. He also had 100 abandoned buildings demolished, far more than his predecessors. He was responsible, at the urging of a local anti-poverty agency, for producing the first functioning housing plan in the city's history, which provided $2,000 grants to homeowners for renovations.

== Mayorship from 1996 to 2000 ==
After leaving office Hanna returned to his business and lived in Paris and Florida before selling his company and returning to Utica around 1990. Hanna ran for mayor again in 1991 as an independent but lost. He was elected comptroller in 1993. Hanna stated that he spent a quarter of a million dollars rehabilitating his political career.

In 1995, Utica was in financial crisis: that summer the city had received a bond rating of CCC from Standard & Poor's, the lowest of any city in the country. Nominated by the Utica Democratic Party, Hanna won in a three-way race against the Republican incumbent mayor and a Republican councilwoman. Hanna immediately made cuts, reducing city staff, closing a fire station, and partially shutting another station. He came into conflict with the fire department after firefighters were injured in a burning building, with a department report blaming understaffing, and a report commissioned by Hanna blaming leadership errors. Amid a wave of arson in 1997, Hanna often lambasted the fire department in public statements. In the 1996 budget, Hanna zeroed out funding for the Utica Public Library and Utica Zoo, although the city council restored most of the funding. He spoke of wanting to eliminate city government entirely. On the other hand, Hanna prioritized the rebuilding of Hanna Park outside City Hall during this financial crisis, including restoring the "My Way" chimes in the Tower of Hope.

In late 1999, Hanna reintroduced the silent treatment for the Observer-Dispatch, requiring reporters to file written questions to department heads. These written requests often went unanswered. Interviews were banned, and for a time the police blotter was unavailable, resulting in incomplete coverage of basic traffic incidents. Gannett sued the city, and the city countersued. After court action ensuring the newspaper would not be restricted from accessing City Hall, the ban was lifted in May 2000.

The city was audited by the U.S. Department of Housing and Urban Development regarding $1.3 million of federal funds spent in 1997 and 1998.

Hanna handily won reelection in 1999 but resigned suddenly in July 2000. Although he claimed to be resigning due to health problems, at the time he was facing allegations of sexual harassment from four male city employees. Hanna never admitted wrongdoing, but the city approved a $250,000 settlement, and Hanna contributed $75,000 to legal expenses.

Hanna sold his home in Utica in 2003 and moved to Fayetteville, New York, but moved back to Utica in 2007. Hanna ran for mayor once more in 2007 as an independent but lost in a three-way race. He died on March 3, 2009, in Fayetteville and is buried in Calvary Cemetery in Utica.

== Legacy ==
Hanna's election in 1974 was part of a national decline in boss-led political machines, although Elefante's power had been in decline well before Hanna was elected. The New York Times compared him to Maine governor James B. Longley and California governor Jerry Brown, other independent Democrats who came into their roles on a wave of post-Watergate dissatisfaction with the political establishment. During the first presidency of Donald Trump, some Uticans drew parallels between Trump and Hanna.

Hanna's impact on Utica's government was mixed. He achieved an 8 percent property tax cut in his first budget, another tax cut the second year, and avoided any tax increases while he was in office. However, the city employees he fired contributed to an increase in unemployment over his first term. City residents complained that snow removal by the underfunded Department of Public Works was ineffectual, and after a major storm in January 1976, auto accidents rose four times the average. Mayors of Utica who served after Hanna said his cuts were largely unsustainable, and they were forced to deal with the fallout of his actions by bearing the blame for increased taxes or city payroll, repaying funds, and making settlements for actions Hanna had taken. While some of Hanna's projects remain in good shape, some fell into disrepair, such as the marina on the Erie Canal which the city sought to sell to the New York State Canal Corporation in 2016. Maintaining all the city parks created by Hanna became financially stressful once the grant money was no longer available. Hanna failed to attract any new large employers, although since Utica had not attracted any substantial job investment since the 1950s, that failure cannot be wholly ascribed to him. Hanna remains well-regarded among some Uticans.

Hanna's nephew, Richard Hanna, served in the United States House of Representatives as a Republican from 2011 to 2017.

== See also ==
- List of mayors of Utica, New York
