= Murder of Bianca Devins =

2019 child murder in New York, U.S.

- Bianca Devins
- Location: Utica, New York, U.S.
- Date: July 14, 2019; 7 years ago
- Attack type: Child murder by stabbing
- Deaths: 1 (Devins)
- Injuries: 1 (Clark; self-inflicted)
- Victims: Bianca Michelle Devins, aged 17
- Perpetrator: Brandon Andrew Clark
- Motive: Envy, obsession
- Verdict: Pleaded guilty
- Convictions: Second-degree murder
- Outcome: "Bianca's Law" signed into law by Governor Kathy Hochul in 2022
- Sentence: Life imprisonment with the possibility of parole after 25 years
- Litigation: Lawsuit against the Oneida County District Attorney's office by Devins's parents; dismissed in 2022

Bianca Michelle Devins (October 2, 2001 – July 14, 2019) was an American teenager from Utica, New York, who was murdered by a male friend, Brandon Andrew Clark, on July 14, 2019. Following a botched suicide attempt, Clark was charged with second-degree murder. He subsequently pleaded guilty to the murder and was sentenced to 25 years to life in prison.

Police reports stated that Devins and Clark were in an intimate relationship, although Devins perceived the relationship differently. Devins's sister called Clark a close family friend, while others feared he was exploitative. The murder took place after Clark allegedly witnessed Devins kissing another man.

Devins's murder received considerable attention from the press and social media. Initial reports were marred by misinformation. Photos of Devins's corpse were taken by Clark and shared widely online, sparking both mockery and sympathy. Instagram and other social media platforms were criticized by users, experts, and politicians for their role in distributing these images, leading to the passing of "Bianca's Law" in New York State. Commentators have discussed the unique nature of the crime and its relation to the structure of social media.

== Background ==
Bianca Michelle Devins (aged 17 at death) intended to study psychology at Mohawk Valley Community College in Utica. Her struggles with mental illness, specifically depression, anxiety, borderline personality disorder, and post-traumatic stress disorder, were a concern for her loved ones. She "had been in and out of the hospital receiving mental health treatment for much of her teen years." Having experienced feelings of isolation, she found refuge in online communities. According to Syracuse newspaper The Post-Standard, Devins had dealt with online harassment by incels for at least two years, although police said they were not aware of ties between the incel movement and Clark's murder of Devins.

Brandon Andrew Clark was born on October 6, 1997 (aged 21 at the time he murdered Devins). As a child, he had once witnessed his father holding his mother at knifepoint for several hours, resulting in a stand-off with law enforcement. Upon meeting Clark, Devins's mother, Kimberly Devins, said he "seemed very nice" and was "polite".

=== Relationship between Devins and Clark ===
It is believed that Clark and Devins met on Instagram in April 2019, after he started following her on the social media platform. Police described their friendship as a "personally intimate one", but friends and family claimed otherwise. (Note: Some sources reported them to be dating and in a sexual relationship.) He initially told the family he was 19, but they quickly learned his real age. Devins told her mother that she had explained to Clark that she did not want to date him, though Devins's mother thought that he still "wanted more." One of Devins's sisters called Clark a trusted family friend, but friends of Devins who were interviewed by Huffington Post "said Clark sometimes gave her drugs to get her to hang out with him", and one of them feared that Clark was exploiting Devins sexually "while they were high".

== Murder ==
On July 13, 2019, Devins, Clark, and a mutual friend named Alex attended a performance by Canadian-American singer-songwriter Nicole Dollanganger in New York City. Following the show, Clark and Devins returned to Utica. The two engaged in an argument, likely regarding a kiss between Alex and Devins, according to prosecutors. At some point, Devins fell asleep in the back seat of the car, and Clark began assaulting her, slicing her neck with a long knife that he had hidden by his seat. Devins died in the early morning hours of July 14. (Note: Some news sources erroneously stated a death date of July 13.) Her body, nearly decapitated, was left in the car, as Clark built a bonfire and listened to the song "Test Drive" by Joji.

After Devins's death, Clark called numerous family members. His call resembled a suicide note, prompting his family to call 9-1-1. He posted photographs of Devins's body to Discord, accompanied by the caption: "sorry fuckers, you're going to have to find somebody else to orbit." (Note: Orbiting is the act of following a person online, requesting pictures from other users, and in some cases stalking.) A video of the murder was also created. By 7:00 AM, Discord users who witnessed pictures of Devins's body had notified the police, who received "numerous" calls, including one from Clark, and made contact with Devins's family. (Note: Devins's family were first made aware by the images being sent to them.) In his call to the dispatcher, Clark said:

My name is Brandon, the victim is Bianca Michelle Devins. I'm not going to stay on the phone for long, because I still need to do the suicide part of the murder-suicide.

Upon the arrival of law enforcement, Clark stabbed himself in the neck. He lay across a green tarp concealing Devins's body, and posted more photos online. A suicide note and message were found, the latter reading: "May you never forget me." The next day, police confirmed that the victim was Devins, and charged Clark with second-degree murder.

Having "had the knife and equipment to videotape the killing", authorities reported the possibility that he had planned the murder. Police Sgt. Michael Curley believed Clark desired fame. Oneida County assistant district attorney Sarah DeMellier stated that he gave various explanations for the killing to multiple people. He had made online searches on how to find the carotid artery, how to incapacitate or kill someone, and general searches for choking and hanging.

== Reaction ==
=== Local ===
A vigil for Devins was held on July 15, 2019, and her funeral took place four days later on July 19. Another vigil was held in July 2020. On February 14, 2020, a fashion and art show displaying Devins's work was held. Week-long counseling sessions were offered to Thomas R. Proctor High School students. The Adirondack Bank Center at the Utica Memorial Auditorium was lit up in honor of Devins. Devins's grandfather thanked the Utica community for their support.

=== Social media ===
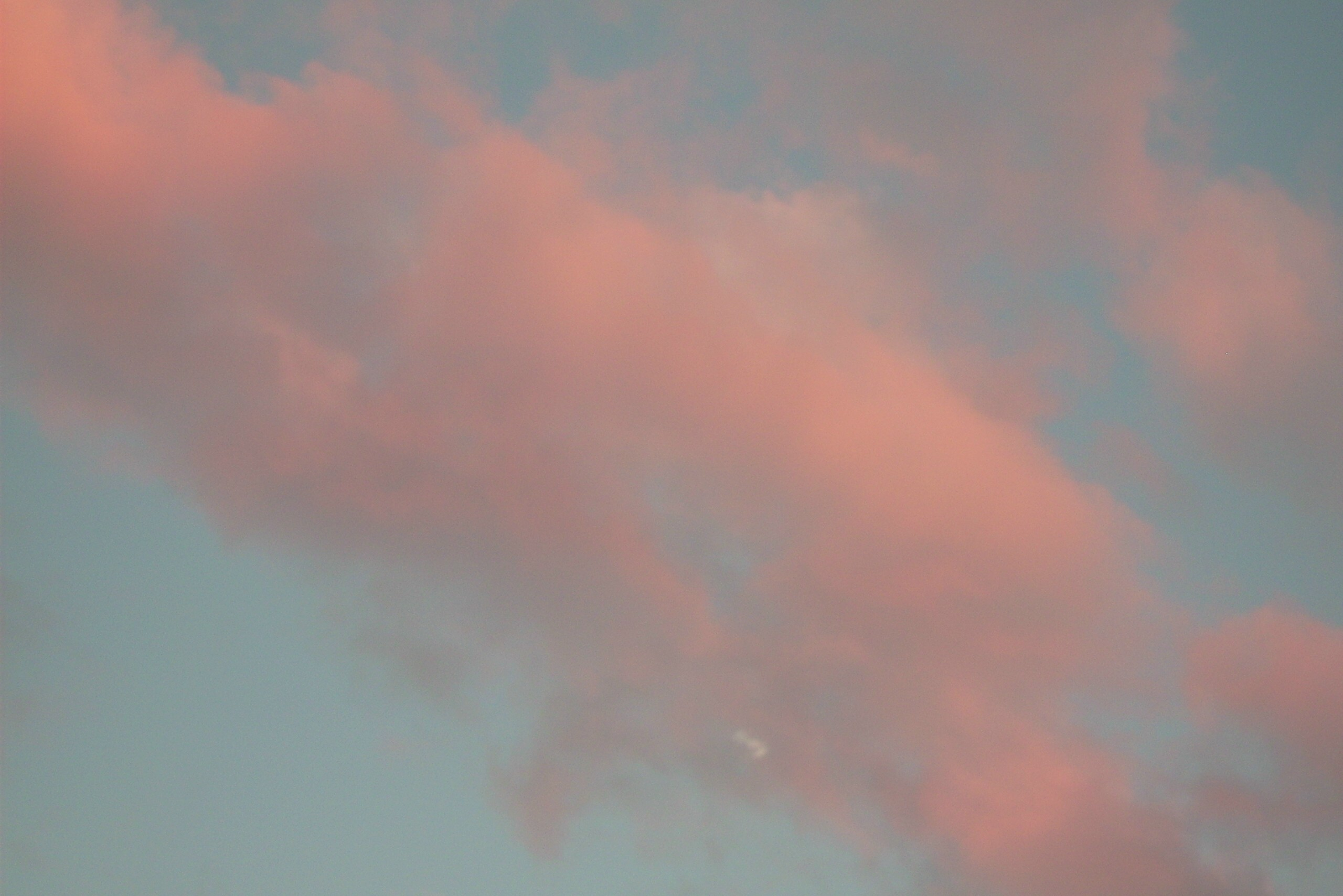
#pinkcloudsforbianca was used to share photos and original artwork of pink clouds, to combat the spread of images containing Devins's corpse.

The images of Devins's corpse became widely shared on social media such as Instagram, Facebook and Twitter. They gained traction on the website 4chan, with hundreds of posts praising Clark for committing "another 4chan murder". Users on Incels.co and 8chan were also celebratory. #ripbianca briefly trended on Twitter. Accounts promised to post images of Devins's murder in exchange for likes and follows, and illegitimate fundraising websites sprang up to capitalize on her name and death.

The initial online discussion of the murder was marred by misinformation and rumors that were spread by users. Tweets from prominent Twitter users—one of which was shared over 16,000 times—identified Clark as an incel, despite evidence to the contrary. (Note: Police said they were unaware of a connection between the "Incel movement" and Devins' murder.) Online speculation on the crime's nature was "rampant"; users on Twitter, YouTube and Reddit examined Devins's history and sought to explain the murder.

Criminal justice professor James Densley said that the images could cause trauma in those who viewed them. Her stepfather, who suffered the most harassment, reported having flashbacks and her sister said she saw the images in her mind before she fell asleep. Devins's mother said, "So many people have been affected by the pictures, scarred for life and suffering from PTSD, unable to erase the image from their mind". Nicole Dollanganger asked that people stop sharing the photos.

==== Company responses ====
Instagram and Facebook removed Clark's account and attempted to stop the photos' spread. Facebook added images of the murder to a digital fingerprint database and blacklisted the hashtag #yesjuliet. The Discord server that Clark utilized was shut down. Users who attempted to report the photos on Instagram found that they were not considered violations of community guidelines. Instagram's response was met with criticism.

HuffPost reported that some images stayed on Instagram for as long as four days; Devins's mother claimed that by September the images could still be found on Facebook. Prosecutors in the trial said the images could still be found months later. Devins's sister reported that nearly two years later, the photos were still being sent to her. Hany Farid, a scholar of digital forensics and image analysis, claimed that Instagram and other companies had the tools to deal with the spread and that their inaction bordered on the criminal—despite a strictly legal perspective saying otherwise.

=== News reports and commentary ===
By July 15, 2019, the story had reached mainstream news and was considered to be the most publicized case of social media documenting a murder. Devins had 2,000 followers prior to her death: by July 15, her follower count had risen by 75,000. Initial reports of her murder overstated her online popularity based on the post-mortem number of followers.

Melissa Jeltsen of HuffPost recalled that in the immediate aftermath of Devins's death, "Everyone wanted [it] to mean something." The Post-Standard's Elizabeth Doran noted the case was more closely related to "the well-worn story ... of abusive male partners". Queenie Wong of CNET and Densley found that the murder demonstrated the problems with how social media responds to violent imagery. The Internet's connection to the murder has been noted by many.

The crime has been discussed as a case of domestic violence against women caused by toxic masculinity. Misogyny was seen by some as relevant to the context of Devins's death. Evelyn Douek of Harvard University drew parallels between the sharing of photos of Devins and the sharing of videos related to the Christchurch shooting. Others have drawn similar conclusions regarding Christchurch, noting that both men repeated the meme "subscribe to PewDiePie" following the events.

Clark's actions following Devins' death have been interpreted as a demonstration of control, including by her mother. Director of criminology Alison Marganski said that Clark's behavior fit the profile of other violent male offenders and speculated that he felt emasculated and wanted to show his strength.

== Aftermath ==
=== Sentencing ===
Clark pleaded not guilty to second-degree murder on July 29, 2019. He was later charged with promoting prison contraband after corrections officers found a shiv, constructed out of a sharpened toothbrush, in his cell. According to Devins's mother, he composed a letter to a friend around this time that saw him "bragging" and noting how it felt to kill. This letter, reportedly, explained his motive: "He couldn't handle the thought of her walking out of his life."

On February 10, 2020, before his trial, Clark changed his plea to guilty. His sentencing was scheduled for April 7, but was delayed because of the COVID-19 pandemic. On June 2, he filed a notice to withdraw his guilty plea, claiming his lawyer had failed him. This was denied, as he had admitted to his guilt. His hearing took place on September 30 and a written decision was drawn up on October 30. On March 16, 2021, Clark was sentenced to 25 years to life in prison. He has formally expressed remorse for his actions.

=== Legislation ===
Devins's mother, alongside then-congressman Anthony Brindisi, called for increased action to be taken by social media companies in regard to graphic content. Instagram reportedly promised to share the results of an audit, requested by Brindisi, by August 2019, although by December, he had yet to receive the results. Brindisi requested that the Federal Trade Commission investigate the case for full accountability.

On September 21, 2020, Brindisi introduced "Bianca's Law" in Congress as H.R.8323. If passed, it would require all social media platforms with more than $10 million in revenue and over 100,000 monthly users to establish an office dedicated to identifying and removing violent content that violates the platform's moderation standards. A version of Bianca's law was also introduced in the New York State Assembly by Marianne Buttenschon and in the State Senate by Joseph Griffo to create criminal and civil penalties for spreading images of a crime victim with the intent of glorification or harassment. It was signed into law by Governor Kathy Hochul at the end of December 2022.

The Devins' family started a scholarship in Bianca's name for students pursuing psychology degrees. In early 2020, Bianca's friends and family held "The Bee Gala", to celebrate her life, showcase artwork she had made, and raise funds for the scholarship.

In July 2021, Devins' family sued the Oneida County District Attorney's Office, accusing them of distribution of child pornography. They had learned from producers of documentaries on the murder that they had received from the district attorney's office footage of Devins' death and of her having sex, as well as the contents of her phone, which included nude photos. Allegedly, a YouTube blogger was also given these in response to a FOIL request.
