= Thomas R. Proctor High School =

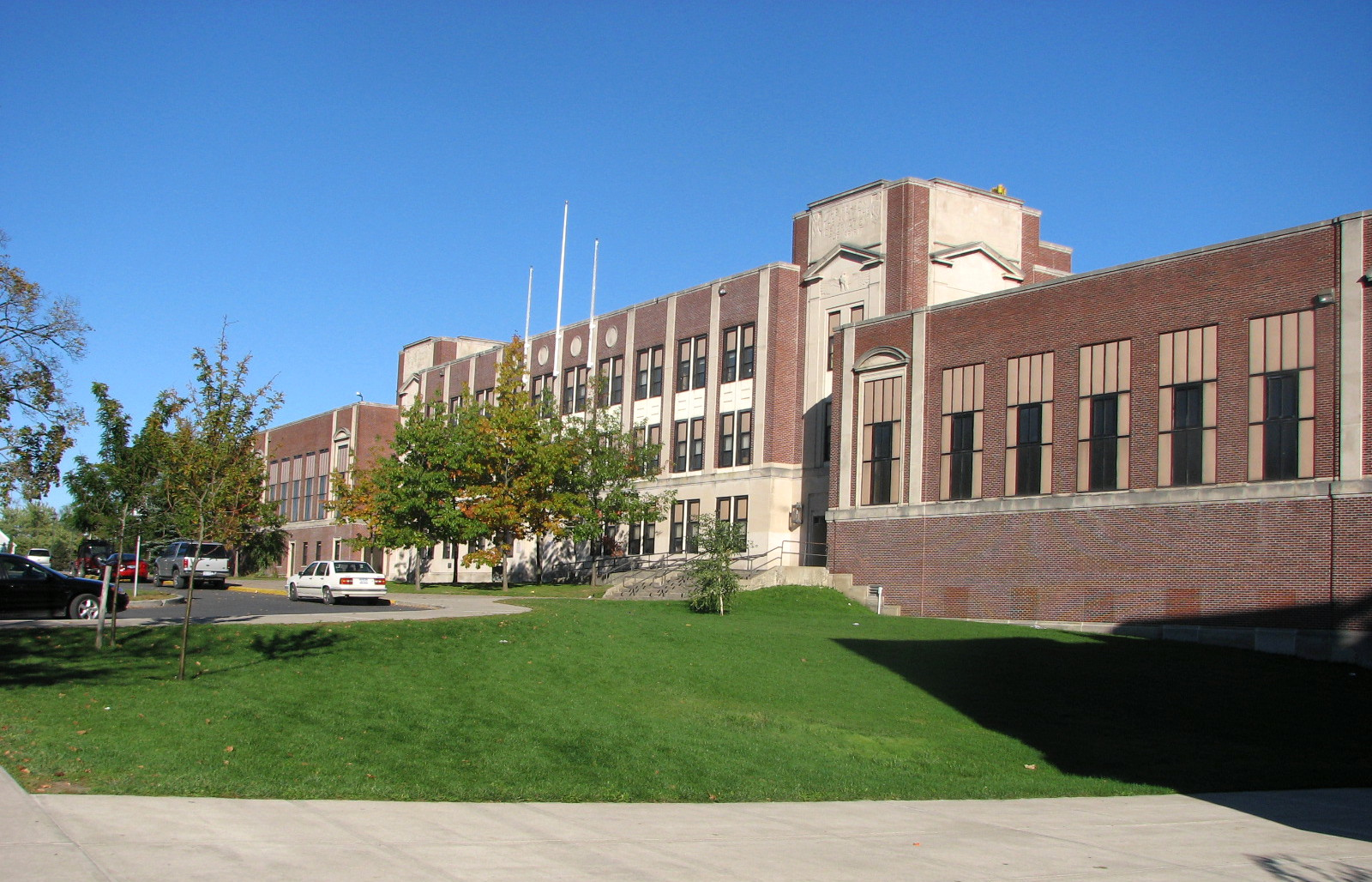
- Front entrance to Thomas R. Proctor High School off Hilton Ave.

Location
- 1203 Hilton Ave. Utica, New York; United States
- Coordinates: 43.0822°N 75.2149°W

Information
- Type: Public
- Established: September 9, 1936
- School district: Utica City School District
- Principal: Ann Marie Palladino
- Teaching staff: 169.96 (FTE)
- Grades: 9–12
- Enrollment: 2,820 (2024–2024)
- Student to teacher ratio: 16.59
- Colors: Red, black, white and silver
- Mascot: Raider
- Website: www.uticaschools.org/schools/proctor

Thomas R. Proctor High School is the only high school in the Utica City School District in Utica, New York. The school was built in 1934 with funds from the Works Progress Administration and Thomas R. Proctor. It opened its doors on September 9, 1936. The school is the only public high school in Utica after Utica Free Academy closed in 1990.

== Demographics ==
Proctor is a highly diverse school. As of the 2021–2022 school year, 2,689 students were enrolled. Of that, 757 (28%) were White, 722 (27%) were Black, 536 (20%) were Hispanic, 527 (20%) were Asian, 138 (5%) were of two or more races, and 9 (less than 1%) were American Indian. Due to the large immigrant and refugee population in Utica, more than 40 languages have been spoken by Proctor students, among them Arabic, Bosnian, Burmese, Karen, Nepali, Russian, Somali, Spanish, Ukrainian, and Vietnamese.

Proctor is eligible for schoolwide Title I, and about three-fourths of students in the 2021–2022 school year were eligible for free or reduced lunch.

== History ==
Thomas Redfield Proctor (May 25, 1844 - July 4, 1920) was a prominent Utica businessman and philanthropist. Thomas R. Proctor Park, which consists of land he purchased and donated to the city, is also named for him.

In 2015, the Utica City School District was sued by six refugee students, who alleged that refugee students older than 16 who were judged to have poor English language skills were denied enrollment at Proctor High School. They were instead diverted into weaker alternative programs that focused solely on English as a foreign language and did not lead to a diploma or adequately prepare for a high school equivalency exam. The suits were settled in 2016, eliminating the alternative programs.

== Athletic department ==
Thomas R. Proctor High School offers a variety of sports for both girls and boys to compete in at varsity and junior varsity levels. The 2007 boys varsity baseball team were class AA NYSPHSAA champions. The varsity cheerleading squad also holds a national title, and placed first in all five of their competitions in the school year of 2007–2008.

Type	Fall sports	Winter sports	Spring sports
Girls	Cross country, diving, gymnastics, soccer, swimming, tennis, volleyball	Basketball, bowling cheerleading, indoor track	Golf, softball, track & field
Boys	Cross country, football, golf, soccer, volleyball	Basketball, bowling, diving, ice hockey, indoor track, swimming	Baseball, lacrosse, tennis, track & field
Mixed	Cheerleading	Cheerleading	None

== Notable alumni ==
- Michael Arcuri, congressman for New York's 24th congressional district
- Richard Benedetto, journalist and professor
- Dave Cash, former Major League Baseball player
- Dominick Dawes, hockey coach and recipient of the 2009 Edward Jeremiah Award
- Bianca Devins, internet celebrity and murder victim
- Brianna Kiesel, 2015 WNBA draftee
- Joseph Michael, singer (dropped out before graduation)
- Tiffany "New York" Pollard, reality star (Flavor of Love, I Love New York, New York Goes to Hollywood)
- Will Smith, American football player (New Orleans Saints)
