= Alexander T. Goodwin =

American politician (1837–1899)

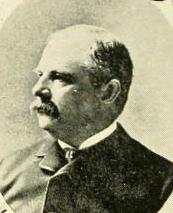
Alexander T. Goodwin

Alexander Taylor Goodwin (August 9, 1837 – July 3, 1899) was an American lawyer and politician from New York.

== Biography ==
He was the son of Robert Morris Goodwin (1796–1861) and Elizabeth Ann (Taylor) Goodwin (1802–1882). He was born and attended private schools in Savannah. In 1852, the family removed to New Brunswick, New Jersey, and Alexander graduated from Rutgers College. In 1858, he began to study law in the office of Conkling & Throop in Utica, New York, was admitted to the bar in 1859, and practiced in Utica. On November 11, 1863, he married Mary Wager, daughter of State Senator David Wager (c.1804–1870), and they had three daughters two of whom died in infancy.

In 1863, he was appointed as a clerk in the New York Adjutant General's office; and soon after commissioned as adjutant of the 45th Regiment of the National Guard. He was Recorder of the City of Utica from 1864 to 1868.

He was a member of the New York State Senate (19th D.) in 1878 and 1879.

He was Mayor of Utica from 1890 to 1892; and a presidential elector in 1892, voting for Grover Cleveland and Adlai E. Stevenson.

== Personal life ==
Goodwin was an Episcopalian.

== Sources ==
- Civil List and Constitutional History of the Colony and State of New York compiled by Edgar Albert Werner (1884; pg. 291)
- The State Government for 1879 by Charles G. Shanks (Weed, Parsons & Co, Albany NY, 1879; pg. 61)
- SWITCHED OFF FOR MURPHY in NYT on January 10, 1893
- The Goodwin Families in America (1899; pg. 113)

New York State Senate
Preceded by Theodore S. Sayre	New York State Senate; 19th District; 1878–1879	Succeeded by William W. Rockwell
