= Rufus Elefante =

American political boss (1903–1994)

Rufus Pasquale Elefante

Chairman of the Utica Democratic Committee
- In office 1928–1980s

Personal details
- Born: April 11, 1903
- Died: November 15, 1994 (aged 91)
- Occupation: Political boss, trucker

Rufus Pasquale "Rufie" Elefante (April 11, 1903 – November 15, 1994) was an American political boss from Utica, New York. Originally a Republican, who worked as a trucker, Elefante rose to power during the late 1920s. Though he never held public office, he came to control the Democratic political machine in Utica, which dominated Utica politics from the 1930s through the 1950s. Although the machine oversaw a period of economic stability for Utica, its tolerance of organized crime led to widespread corruption and vice, giving Utica the nickname "Sin City". Elefante was the most powerful figure in Oneida County during his time, and is still regarded as the Utica politician with the largest legacy. He remains a very controversial figure in Utica politics.

== Early life and career ==
Elefante was born in Utica on April 11, 1903, to Pasquale and Angela Marie Pacillio Elefante. He did not complete high school. He claimed that his political career began at the age of 16, when he helped to get out the vote in East Utica.

Most Italian-Americans, including Elefante, were Republicans until the 1920s when the Republican Party became more nativist, prohibitionist, and anti-immigrant. Unlike in New York City with Tammany Hall, the largely-Irish Democratic establishment in Utica collaborated with Italians rather than resisting them. Utica Italians gradually switched to primarily supporting Democrats through the course of '20s, and came to dominate Utica Democratic politics beginning in the early '30s. Elefante switched parties in 1928.

== Boss of Utica ==
In 1928, Elefante organized a large rally in Utica for Franklin D. Roosevelt, who was running for Governor of New York. Roosevelt, who spoke at the event, seemed grateful to Elefante and other local Democrats such as M. William Bray and Charles S. Donnelley (who would be elected mayor the next year). Roosevelt would direct funds for public projects to Utica Democrats throughout his governorship and presidency. This was especially impactful as the Great Depression had devastated Utica's textile mills. Republican political boss and Elefante's former mentor Alfred Bertolini died in 1929, leaving a political vacuum that the Elefante, Bray, and Donnelley machine promptly filled. Democratic political machines like in Utica were Roosevelt's islands of support in a largely Republican upstate New York.

"Honest graft" was common under the machine: city employees were required to kick back 2 to 4 percent of their salaries to the machine, and Elefante himself profited from city contracts. While the machine provided patronage to working people, it distanced itself from left-wing labor movements that had been active among Utica Italians. Elefante also avoided aligning himself with Mussolini, and so reaped the benefits of identity-building by Italian nationalists while avoiding the political repercussions experienced by other Italian political leaders when the United States joined World War II.

Elefante and others worked out of Marino's Restaurant in downtown Utica, dubbed "Little City Hall" by the press. One visitor observed that different booths served different forms of patronage: one for jobs, one for welfare, one for contracts, and so on. Marino's was razed in a 1972 urban renewal project.

Utica's primary employer, the textile industry, had been in decline since World War I. During the '40s, Elefante and his allies lobbied heavily to attract new industry to replace it. The resulting period of economic stability in Utica, lasting through the '40s and '50s, is sometimes called Utica's "Loom to Boom" era. Organized crime also flourished during the era, operating basically unimpeded by the Utica political machine. Gambling and prostitution were widespread, with several known brothels doing business near City Hall. One brothel operated uninterrupted for twenty years. Direct involvement between the Utica machine and the Mafia has been speculated on, but lacks evidence. Utica's most powerful mob bosses were the Buffalo crime family leaders Salvatore Falcone and his brother Joseph.

== Decline ==
In 1949, Elefante and nine others were indicted on charges of vote buying, but none were convicted.

Utica's newspapers the Utica Daily Press and Utica Observer-Dispatch published investigative reporting and editorials about the Elefante machine throughout the 1950s. They would later win the 1959 Pulitzer Prize for Public Service for their reporting on corruption in Utica. The machine withstood this criticism until 1957, when it was revealed that three Uticans (the Falcone brothers and a partner) had attended the Apalachin meeting of Mafia members. Although none of the men were involved in Utica politics, the papers contended that the Elefante machine turned a blind eye to mafia activity. National news outlets began reporting on what previously only Utica's papers had been covering. Federal, state, and local agencies made investigations into corruption in Utica, including a special commission by governor and former Elefante ally W. Averell Harriman. These resulted in the resignation of the chief of police, the replacement of the district attorney, and the arrest of many other Utica government officials and employees on charges related to prostitution, gambling, fraud, and conspiracy. Elefante and other top Democratic leaders were not indicted, although a lieutenant to Elefante was convicted of bribing a witness, attempting to incite perjury, and conspiracy to obstruct justice.

Although the Democratic machine in Utica was weakened, Elefante remained a political figure in Utica. He still held the post of chairman in 1965. Elefante served as an advisor to Ed Hanna in 1974, Hanna's first year as mayor of Utica, but resigned seven months later, saying Hanna did not listen to his advice.

Elefante died on November 15, 1994. He is buried at Calvary Cemetery in Utica.
