= Samuel Lowery =

Samuel Lowery may refer to:

- Samuel R. Lowery (1832–c. 1900), African American preacher and lawyer
- Samuel S. Lowery (1831–1912), American manufacturer and politician from New York
