= Will Smith (defensive end) =

American football player (1981–2016)

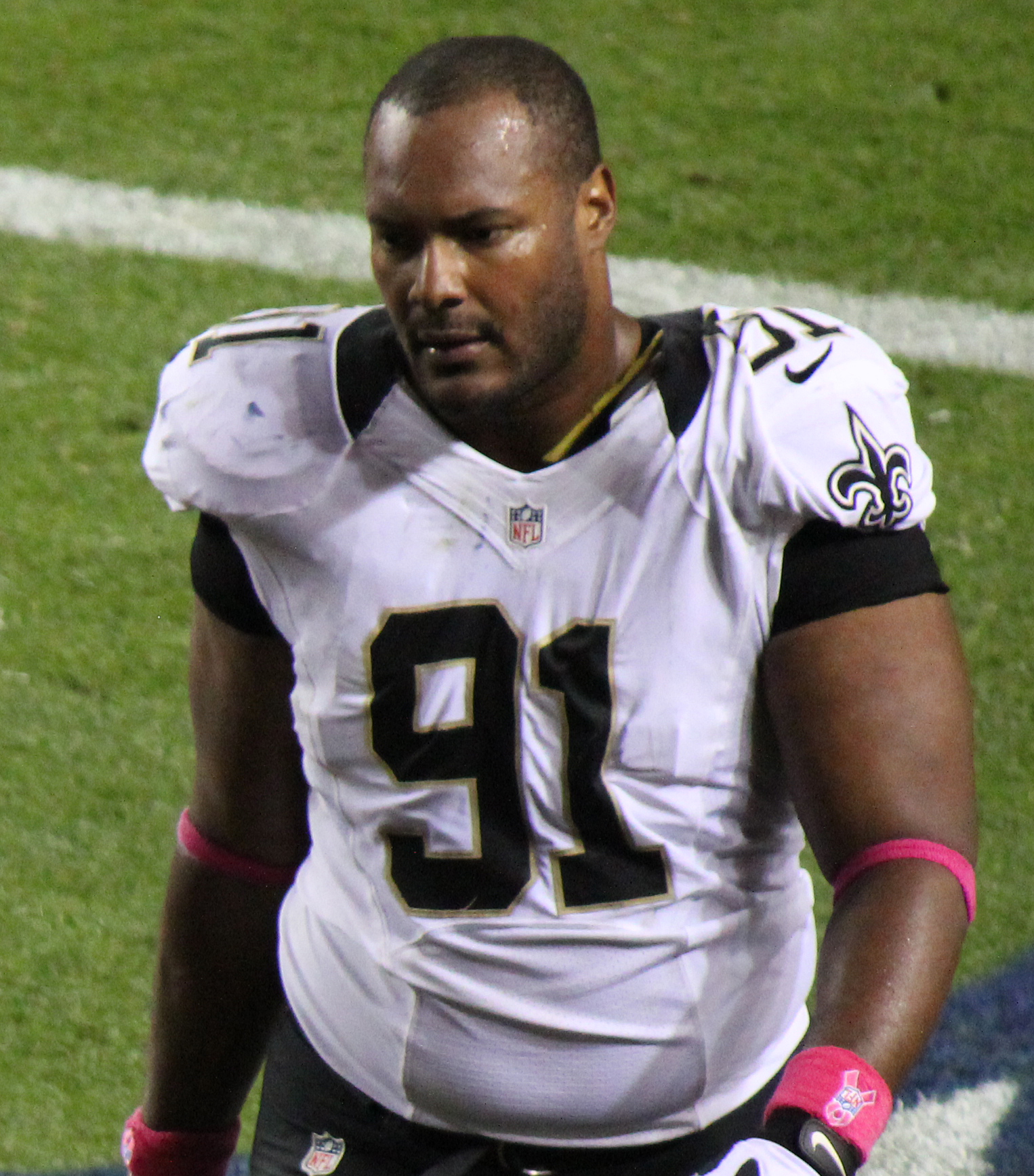
- Smith with the New Orleans Saints in 2012

No. 91
- Position: Defensive end

Personal information
- Born: July 4, 1981; Queens, New York, U.S.
- Died: April 9, 2016 (aged 34); New Orleans, Louisiana, U.S.
- Listed height: 6 ft 3 in (1.91 m)
- Listed weight: 282 lb (128 kg)

Career information
- High school: Proctor (Utica, New York)
- College: Ohio State (2000–2003)
- NFL draft: 2004: 1st round, 18th overall pick

Career history
- New Orleans Saints (2004–2013); New England Patriots (2014)*
- * Offseason or practice squad member only

Awards and highlights
- Super Bowl champion (XLIV); Pro Bowl (2006); NFL forced fumbles co-leader (2004); PFWA All-Rookie Team (2004); New Orleans Saints Ring of Honor; New Orleans Saints Hall of Fame; BCS national champion (2002); First-team All-American (2003); Big Ten Defensive Player of the Year (2003); Big Ten Defensive Lineman of the Year (2003); First-team All-Big Ten (2003); Second-team All-Big Ten (2002)

Career NFL statistics
- Total tackles: 463
- Sacks: 67.5
- Forced fumbles: 20
- Fumble recoveries: 7
- Pass deflections: 26
- Interceptions: 2
- Stats at Pro Football Reference

William Raymond Smith III (July 4, 1981 – April 9, 2016) was an American professional football defensive end who played in the National Football League (NFL). He played college football for the Ohio State Buckeyes and was selected by the New Orleans Saints in the first round of the 2004 NFL draft, where he played for the entirety of his career. On April 9, 2016, Smith was murdered by firearm during an altercation after a traffic crash.

== Early life ==
Smith was born on July 4, 1981, in Queens, New York, to William and Lisa Smith. He was raised in Utica, New York. At Proctor High School in Utica, Smith was a USA Today All-American pick, and was rated by Prep Football Report as the best defensive line prospect in the state. As a senior, he had 20 sacks.

== College career ==
Smith was a four-year letterman at Ohio State from 2000 to 2003, he helped lead the Buckeyes to the 2002 BCS National Championship, and he was named a first-team All-American the following year.

== Professional career ==
Pre-draft measurables
| Height | Weight | Arm length | Hand span | 40-yard dash | Three-cone drill | Vertical jump | Broad jump | Bench press | Wonderlic |
|---|---|---|---|---|---|---|---|---|---|
| 6 ft 2 3/4 in (1.90 m) | 275 lb (125 kg) | 32 in (0.81 m) | 8 3/4 in (0.22 m) | 4.60 s | 7.42 s | 38.5 in (0.98 m) | 9 ft 9 in (2.97 m) | 30 reps | 23 |
All values from NFL Combine/Ohio State's Pro Day

=== New Orleans Saints ===
==== 2004–2006 ====
Smith was selected as the 18th pick in the first round of the 2004 NFL draft by the New Orleans Saints. He had a successful rookie season with 30 tackles and 7.5 sacks. In 2005, he had 48 tackles and 8.5 sacks and played well enough that the Saints did not re-sign Darren Howard thus making Smith the starter opposite Charles Grant for the 2006 season. Smith gradually established himself as one of the premier defensive ends in the NFL. In his first season as a full-time starter, Smith became a leader of the defensive line and emerged as one of the NFL's top defensive ends. He was voted to the Pro Bowl and finished tied for 14th in the NFL with a career-best 10.5 sacks. Smith played in 14 games, sitting out the finale with the Saints having clinched a playoff berth and also missing one contest with a knee injury. The club's No. 1 pick in 2004 was a force from his arrival in New Orleans, notching 33.5 sacks in four seasons. His 26.0 sacks in his first three-season are the second-most in club history in so short a span (Charles Grant, 27.5, 2002–04).

In 2006, he was named to his first Pro Bowl as a starter.

==== 2007–2010 ====
Smith recorded a team high 7 sacks, 66 tackles and a safety in 2007. He sacked Carolina Panthers starting QB David Carr early in the season, ending Carr's season.

In 2008, The Saints agreed to terms with Smith on a six-year, $70 million contract with $26 million guaranteed. The deal made him the third highest paid defensive end in the NFL.

On December 2, 2008, Smith was one of six players suspended for use of Bumetanide a diuretic, which can be used as a masking agent for steroid use. It is believed that the diuretic was found in StarCaps, a weight-loss supplement that he had been taking. Smith's original punishment was announced as a four-game suspension, covering the final four games of the 2008 regular season. Enforcement of the suspension was delayed as other players challenged the decision through federal and state courts, and the league allowed all players involved in the matter to continue playing pending a final resolution of the case. Smith's suspension was later reduced to a two games and an additional two lost paychecks, and was served at the beginning of the 2011 NFL season.

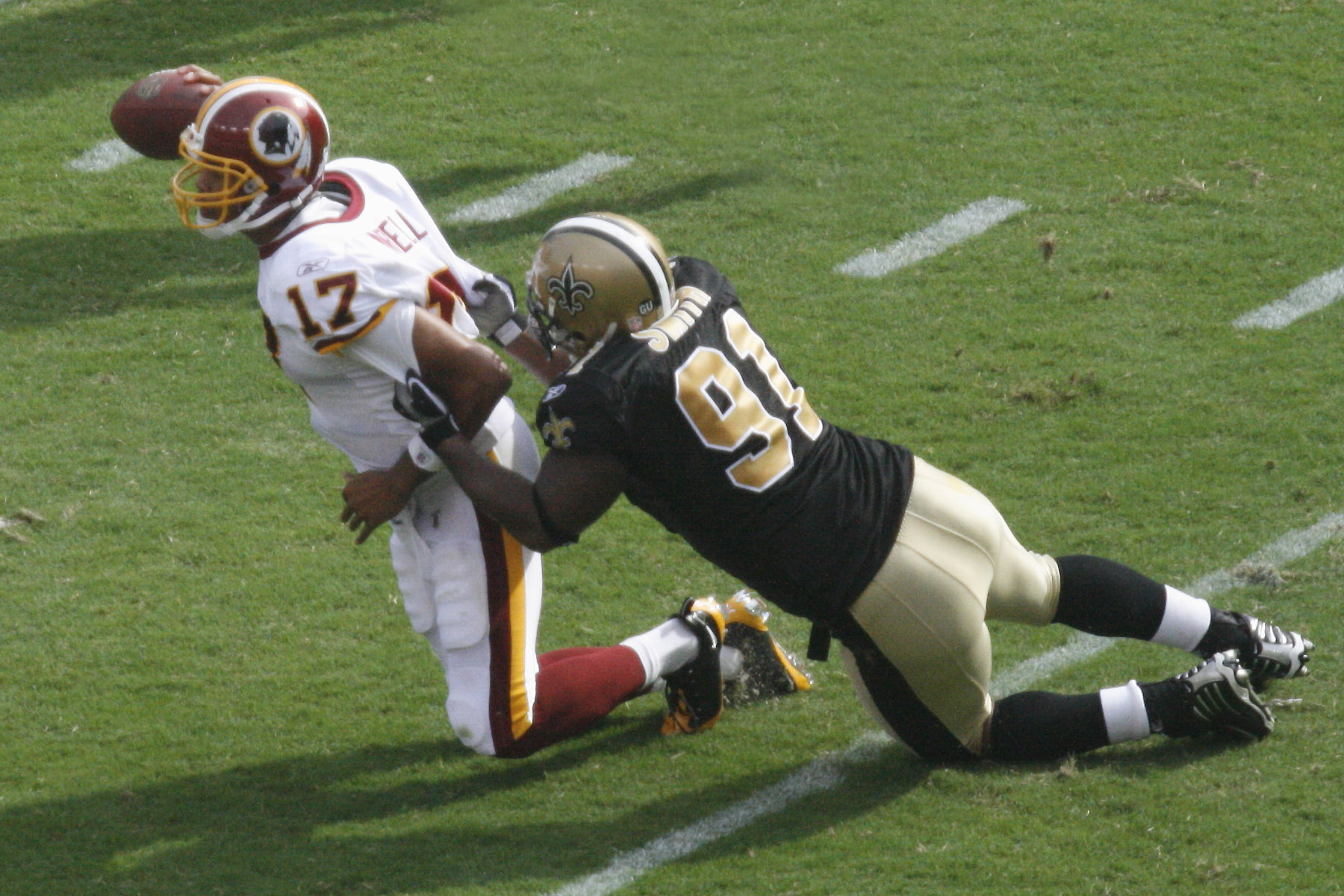
Smith sacks Jason Campbell.

Under new defensive coordinator Gregg Williams in 2009, Smith had a career high 13.0 sacks, 49 tackles, 3 forced fumbles, and one interception. He was honorable mention All-Pro by AP and SN. In 2010, he had 39 tackles and 5.5 sacks.

==== 2011–2013 ====
In 2011, Smith had 35 tackles and 6.5 sacks. On May 2, 2012, Smith was suspended by the NFL for the first four games of the 2012 season because of his alleged role in the New Orleans Saints bounty scandal. Smith's suspension was ultimately overturned on appeal to former commissioner Paul Tagliabue. Smith started all 16 games of the 2012 season, and was credited with 58 tackles and six sacks.

For the 2013 season, Smith was slated to move to the outside linebacker position in the 3–4 defense favored by the Saints' new defensive coordinator, Rob Ryan. However, Smith suffered a knee injury (a torn ACL) in the Saints' third preseason game, against the Houston Texans on August 25, 2013, and was reported to be out for the season. On August 27, the Saints placed Smith on injured reserve, ending his season.

On February 12, 2014, Smith was released by the team.

=== New England Patriots ===
On April 5, 2014, Smith signed with the New England Patriots. He was released by the Patriots on August 24, during the preseason.

== NFL career statistics ==
Legend
| | Led the league |
| **Bold** | Career high |

| Year | Team | GP | Tackles | | | | | Int and Fum | | | | |
| Year | Team | GP | Cmb | Solo | Ast | Sck | Sfty | PD | Int | FF | FR | TD |
|---|---|---|---|---|---|---|---|---|---|---|---|---|
| 2004 | NO | **16** | 42 | 32 | 10 | 7.5 | 0 | 2 | 0 | **6** | 1 | 0 |
| 2005 | NO | **16** | 60 | **48** | 12 | 8.5 | 0 | **6** | 0 | 2 | 1 | 0 |
| 2006 | NO | 14 | 52 | 33 | 19 | 10.5 | 0 | 3 | 0 | 3 | 1 | 0 |
| 2007 | NO | **16** | **66** | 47 | 19 | 7.0 | **1** | 3 | 0 | 2 | **3** | 0 |
| 2008 | NO | **16** | 62 | 43 | 19 | 3.0 | 0 | 1 | 0 | 1 | 0 | 0 |
| 2009 | NO | **16** | 49 | 37 | 12 | **13.0** | 0 | 3 | **1** | 3 | 0 | 0 |
| 2010 | NO | 15 | 39 | 34 | 5 | 5.5 | 0 | 5 | **1** | 1 | 0 | 0 |
| 2011 | NO | 14 | 35 | 22 | 13 | 6.5 | 0 | 2 | 0 | 2 | 0 | 0 |
| 2012 | NO | **16** | 58 | 33 | **25** | 6.0 | 0 | 1 | 0 | 0 | 1 | 0 |
| Career | | 139 | 463 | 329 | 134 | 67.5 | 1 | 26 | 2 | 20 | 7 | 0 |

== Personal life ==
Smith was married to Racquel (née Joseph). They had two children together and he had another child from a previous relationship. Smith is a 2005 graduate of Ohio State, earning a bachelor's degree in criminology.

== Road rage incident and death ==
On April 9, 2016, Smith was involved in a traffic collision in which a Hummer, driven by 28-year-old Cardell Hayes, rear-ended Smith's Mercedes-Benz G Wagon in an ongoing confrontation that allegedly started with Smith's vehicle accidentally rear-ending the Hummer. The final collision caused Hayes' vehicle to collide with the vehicle in front of him, and was hard enough to break the rear window in the Mercedes. Moments earlier and less than two blocks away, in the Lower Garden District of New Orleans, Hayes’ vehicle had been hit by Smith's vehicle. Smith's vehicle contained Smith, his wife Racquel, and two unnamed passengers. In the second collision, Smith and Hayes exchanged words, when Hayes fired a handgun, killing Smith and injuring his wife. Hayes was arrested at the scene. During investigation, a fully loaded 9-millimeter handgun was found in Smith's car. Hayes and a passenger in his vehicle claimed self-defense. After an investigation, the New Orleans Police Department charged Hayes with second-degree murder. Results of a postmortem toxicology report concluded that Smith had a blood alcohol content of .235 on the night of the incident, or nearly three times the legal limit in Louisiana. Smith was buried on April 16, 2016.

Trial began on December 5, 2016, in Orleans Parish Criminal District Court. On December 11, an Orleans Parish jury found Cardell Hayes guilty of manslaughter in the shooting of Will Smith and attempted manslaughter of his wife, Racquel Smith. On April 20, 2017, Hayes was sentenced to 25 years in prison for the charge of manslaughter, and 15 years for the charge of attempted manslaughter, to be served concurrently. On April 19, the day before the sentence, a judge denied Hayes' motion for a new trial.

Three years to the day after Hayes was sentenced, however, the United States Supreme Court handed down the Ramos v. Louisiana ruling, which declared that non-unanimous criminal convictions violate the Sixth and Fourteenth Amendments. Because Hayes had not exhausted his appeals, he was directly impacted by the Ramos decision, and the decision denying a new trial was reversed on November 19, 2020. On January 11, 2021, the Supreme Court vacated Hayes' conviction, pending a new trial. Because Hayes was initially convicted on manslaughter, he cannot face charges greater than manslaughter in the retrial. On January 27, 2024, Hayes was found guilty of manslaughter at his re-trial; he was sentenced to 25 years in prison on April 25, though the sentence was reduced to 22 years on July 23.
