= Cornelius Haley =

American politician (1860–1936)

Mayor of Little Falls, New York
- In office 1922–1923

Member of the New York State Assembly from the Oneida County 1st district
- In office January 1, 1891 – December 31, 1893
- Preceded by: James K. O'Connor
- Succeeded by: Henry P. Hoefler

Personal details
- Born: December 20, 1860 Little Falls, New York, U.S.
- Died: September 28, 1936 (aged 75)
- Party: Democratic
- Spouse: Elizabeth Hannon (m. 1886)
- Children: 2
- Parent(s): John Haley; Mary Haley
- Profession: Politician, molder

Cornelius Haley (December 20, 1860 – September 28, 1936) was an American politician and molder from New York.

== Life ==
Haley was born on December 20, 1860, in Little Falls, New York, the son of Irish immigrants John and Mary Haley. He started working in woolen mills in Little Falls when he was 11. When he was about 16 he moved with his family to Schuyler Lake, where he lived for about two years before returning to Little Falls and the woolen mills. He later moved to New Jersey and learned to be a molder, a profession he'd follow for several years. He moved to Utica in 1883.

In 1890, Haley was elected to the New York State Assembly as a Democrat, representing the Oneida County 1st District. He served in the Assembly in 1891, 1892, and 1893. In 1893, he was appointed chief clerk of the Bureau of Statistics and Labor in Albany. He resigned from the position in 1896. In the 1896 United States House of Representatives election, he was an unsuccessful candidate in New York's 25th congressional district. He served as mayor of Little Falls from 1922 to 1923.

In 1886, Haley married Elizabeth Hannon of Sharon, Pennsylvania. Their children were Mamie Perpetua and James Bernard. Elizabeth died in 1892.

Haley died at home on September 28, 1936.

New York State Assembly
Preceded by James K. O'Connor	New York State Assembly; Oneida County, 1st District; 1891-1893	Succeeded by Henry P. Hoefler
