= Mike Arcuri =

American politician (born 1959)

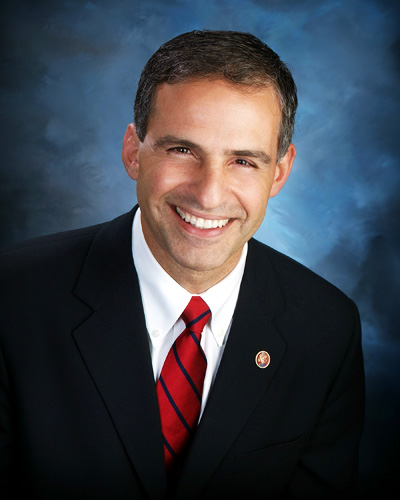

Member of the U.S. House of Representatives from New York's 24th district
- In office January 3, 2007 – January 3, 2011
- Preceded by: Sherwood Boehlert
- Succeeded by: Richard L. Hanna

District Attorney of Oneida County
- In office January 1994 – December 2006
- Preceded by: Barry Donalty
- Succeeded by: Scott McNamara

Personal details
- Born: Michael Angelo Arcuri; June 11, 1959 (age 67) Utica, New York, U.S.
- Party: Democratic
- Spouse: Sabrina Arcuri
- Children: 4
- Education: University at Albany (BA); New York Law School (JD)

Michael Angelo Arcuri (born June 11, 1959) is an American politician who was the U.S. representative for New York's 24th congressional district from 2007 to 2011. He is a member of the Democratic Party. He lost re-election on November 2, 2010, to Republican Richard L. Hanna.

Arcuri is a member and an administrative law judge of the New York Industrial Board of Appeals.

== Early life, education and career ==
Arcuri's father was Carmen Arcuri. His mother, Elizabeth, retired as a stenographer. Arcuri graduated from Thomas R. Proctor High School, in Utica, New York in 1977.

In 1981, Arcuri graduated from the State University of New York at Albany where he majored in history and minored in economics. In 1984, he graduated from New York Law School and was admitted to practice law in New York state in 1985.

Arcuri returned to Utica to open a law office in 1986.

== Oneida County District Attorney ==
In 1993, Arcuri was elected District Attorney of Oneida County, home to Utica. He was only the third Democrat ever to hold the post and the first in 40 years.

== U.S. House of Representatives ==
The 22nd congressional district encompasses a large swath of central New York, including Utica, Auburn, Rome and most of the suburbs of Binghamton.

A member of the centrist Blue Dog Coalition, Arcuri was named by the National Review (March 2010) as one of the most centrist members of the House, with a voting record of 50.2% liberal and 49.8% conservative, a distinction he shared with only one other member of the United States House of Representatives during the 110th Congress.

=== Committee assignments ===
- Committee on Transportation and Infrastructure
  - Subcommittee on Economic Development, Public Buildings, and Emergency Management
  - Subcommittee on Highways and Transit
  - Subcommittee on Railroads, Pipelines, and Hazardous Materials
- Committee on Rules
  - Subcommittee on Rules and the Organization of the House

=== Controversy ===
In 2002, Arcuri personally prosecuted Joseph A. Smith of Oneida for the murder of Desiree Case of Yorkville. Her body was discovered in an abandoned house on February 26, 2000. Smith was arrested on November 29, 2001, after he was charged with two counts of second-degree murder in a sealed indictment. A jury found Smith guilty of both counts of murder in March 2002. In late June 2002 a judge set aside the conviction, when Arcuri brought forward evidence he discovered that the defense was not provided with in the case, most notably the confession of another man, Earl Wright, who was eventually found guilty of the murder of Case. Arcuri dropped charges against Smith and he was released from jail on August 1, 2002. He later filed a claim for misconduct and negligence against the Oneida County District Attorney's Office and the City of Utica, N.Y., Police Department, which was settled out of court.

=== Elections ===
==== 2006 ====
In November 2006, Arcuri defeated State Senator Ray Meier for the 22nd District congressional seat left open by the retiring Sherwood Boehlert. Arcuri won by 54 percent of the vote to Meier's 45 percent, becoming only the second Democrat to represent this district and its predecessors in 106 years, and the first since 1951.

==== 2008 ====
In his bid for re-election in 2008, Arcuri faced a closer-than-expected challenge from businessman Richard L. Hanna but prevailed. Arcuri won 52 percent of the votes to Hanna's 48 percent

==== 2010 ====
In a rematch of the election two years prior, Arcuri faced off again against Hanna but lost 101,599 to 85,624, as the GOP made gains across the country.

==== 2016 ====
Arcuri ran for Oneida County Court judge but lost to Assistant District Attorney Robert Bauer.

== Personal life ==
Arcuri has four children: Carmen Joseph, Dominique, Nicholas Deon, and Sophia Rose Arcuri. He is married to the former Sabrina Kennedy.

Legal offices
Preceded by Barry Donalty	District Attorney of Oneida County; 1994–2006	Succeeded by Scott McNamara
U.S. House of Representatives
Preceded by Sherwood Boehlert	Member of the U.S. House of Representatives from New York's 24th congressional district 2007–2011	Succeeded by Richard L. Hanna
U.S. order of precedence (ceremonial)
Preceded by Randy Kuhl as Former U.S. Representative	Order of precedence of the United States as Former U.S. Representative	Succeeded by John Hall as Former U.S. Representative
