= Greater Pittsburgh Chamber of Commerce =

Pittsburgh area non-profit organization

- Founded: (December 5, 1874; 151 years ago)
- Purpose: Business advocacy & federation
- Location: Pittsburgh, Pennsylvania
- Region served: Pittsburgh metropolitan area
- Website: GreaterPittsburghChamberofCommerce.com

The Greater Pittsburgh Chamber of Commerce is a Pittsburgh area non-profit that promotes business and community development throughout Southwestern Pennsylvania. Since 1999, it has had status under 501(c)(6) Business Leagues; in 2024, it claimed total revenue of $1,759,530, total expenses of $1,759,530, total assets of $319,007, and total giving of $30,000.

Founded on December 5, 1874 the chamber received its charter on July 8, 1876 due to the state's passage of a new constitution during 1874-75. From 1874 until 1904 the chamber had offices at the Germania Bank Building in Downtown Pittsburgh. On June 20, 1904 it relocated to the Oliver Building. March 14, 1906 offices moved to the Keenan Building at Liberty Avenue and Seventh Street. On July 8, 1916 construction started on the Chamber of Commerce Building and opened May 1, 1917 with a membership of 3,000. By 1918 membership had exceeded 5,000.

In 2000, the chamber partnered with the Allegheny Conference, the Pennsylvania Economy League of Greater Pittsburgh and the Pittsburgh Regional Alliance, a partnership that was extended in 2003 with a joint venture that merged memberships and leadership of all four organizations.

== National politics ==
The chamber hosted President Grant on December 13, 1879, President Howard Taft on October 31, 1911 and Treasury Secretary John Connally on January 31, 1972. During the late twentieth and early twenty-first centuries, the chamber was led by Barbara McNees, who was appointed as the executive director in 1996 and continued in that capacity until her retirement on August 15, 2013.

== See also ==
- Duquesne Club
- Economic Club of Pittsburgh
- Allegheny HYP Club
- RIDC
