= Sherwood Boehlert =

American politician (1936–2021)

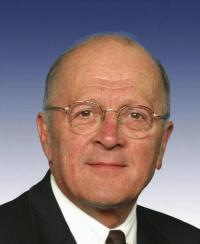

Chair of the House Science Committee
- In office January 3, 2001 – January 3, 2007
- Preceded by: Jim Sensenbrenner
- Succeeded by: Bart Gordon

Member of the U.S. House of Representatives from New York
- In office January 3, 1983 – January 3, 2007
- Preceded by: Donald J. Mitchell (redistricting)
- Succeeded by: Mike Arcuri
- Constituency: 25th district (1983–1993); 23rd district (1993–2003); 24th district (2003–2007)

County Executive of Oneida County, New York
- In office January 1, 1980 – December 31, 1982
- Preceded by: William Bryant
- Succeeded by: John Plumley

Personal details
- Born: Sherwood Louis Boehlert; September 28, 1936 Utica, New York, U.S.
- Died: September 20, 2021 (aged 84) New Hartford, New York, U.S.
- Party: Republican
- Spouses: Jean Bone (m. 1959; div. 1976) Marianne Willey (m. 1976)
- Education: Utica College (BA)
- Sherwood Boehlert's voice Sherwood Boehlert speaks in support of FY2006 appropriations for science-focused government agencies Recorded November 9, 2005

Sherwood Louis Boehlert (September 28, 1936 – September 20, 2021) was an American politician from New York. He represented a large swath of central New York in the United States House of Representatives from 1983 until 2007. Boehlert, a Republican, was considered to be a member of the party's moderate wing. He served as chairman of the Science Committee from 2001 to 2006.

== Early life, education, and early political career ==
Sherwood Louis Boehlert was born on September 28, 1936, in Utica, New York, to Elizabeth Monica (née Champoux) and Sherwood Boehlert, and graduated from Utica College. He was a practicing Roman Catholic. He served two years in the United States Army (1956–1958) and then worked as a manager of public relations for Wyandotte Chemical Company. After leaving Wyandotte, Boehlert served as Chief of Staff for two upstate Congressmen, Alexander Pirnie and Donald J. Mitchell; following this, he was elected county executive of Oneida County, New York, serving from 1979 to 1983. He ran successfully for Congress in the elections of 1982. He was re-elected to every Congress subsequent until his retirement.

== U.S. House of Representatives ==
=== Elections ===
Mitchell did not run for reelection in 1982. Boehlert entered the Republican primary to succeed him in the district, which had been renumbered from the 31st to the 25th in redistricting. He won the primary with 56% of the vote. He won the general election by defeating Democrat Anita Maxwell 56%–42%.

After that, he won re-election every two years until he decided to retire and not seek re-election, in 2006. His district number changed twice, each time after redistricting—from the 25th (1983–1993) to the 23rd (1993–2003) to the 24th (2003- 2007). He was challenged in the Republican primary five times: 1986 (67%), 1996 (65%), 2000 (57%), 2002 (53%), and 2004 (60%). His lowest re-election winning percentage in the general election was 57%, in his last re-election in 2004, when he defeated Democrat Jeff Miller 57%–34%.

=== Tenure ===
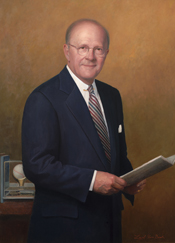
Boehlert's official portrait (painted by Laurel Boeck) as Science and Technology Committee Chairman

Boehlert is best known for his work on environmental policy. Beginning in the 1980s with the acid rain crisis, Boehlert became a prominent voice in the Republican party for the environment. He was a major contributor to the acid rain provisions of the Clean Air Act Amendments of 1990. He pushed continually to increase Corporate Average Fuel Economy (CAFE) standards for light trucks and automobiles and was the lead GOP sponsor of numerous CAFE amendments. Due to Boehlert's constant battles over environmental legislation, often putting him at odds with his party's leadership, National Journal dubbed Boehlert the "Green Hornet" and featured him as one of the dozen "key players" in the House of Representatives. Due to his centrist views, Time Magazine also recognized Boehlert as a "power center" on Capitol Hill and Congressional Quarterly named him one of the 50 most effective Members of Congress. Boehlert was a member of several national moderate GOP groups including the Republican Main Street Partnership and the Ripon Society.

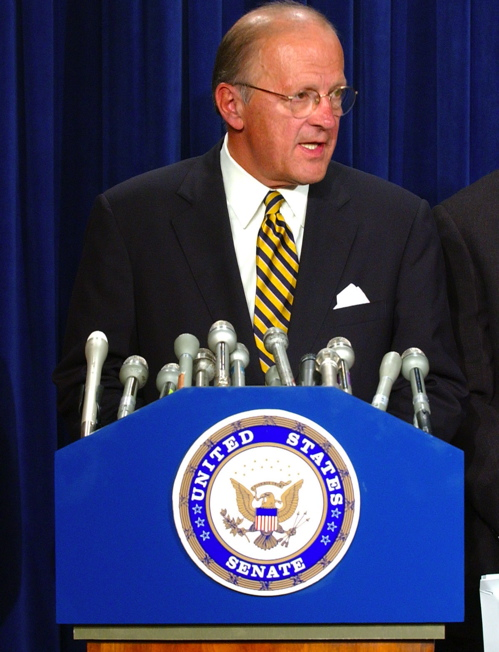
Boehlert at a press conference

On the Science Committee, Boehlert championed investments in the National Science Foundation, science and math education programs and the Department of Energy's Office of Science. As chairman he pushed for measures to increase cybersecurity research and the creation of a Science and Technology Directorate at the Department of Homeland Security. After 9/11 and the 2001 anthrax attacks, Boehlert crafted legislation establishing the DHS S&T Directorate to oversee development of technologies to secure against terrorist attacks. This homeland security S&T bill reported out of the Science Committee was ultimately accepted by the congressional leadership and President Bush and enacted as part of the Homeland Security Act of 2002. Boehlert was one of the first Members of Congress to call for a competitiveness agenda, culminating with a major National Academy of Sciences report Rising Above the Gathering Storm on retaining U.S. leadership in science and engineering, as well as the American Competitiveness Initiative introduced by President Bush in 2006.

Boehlert was an active promoter of first responder legislation, a strong champion for volunteer firefighters and original member and Chairman of the Congressional Fire Services Caucus.

On March 17, 2006, at a press conference Boehlert announced that he would not seek a thirteenth term in office. Several important landmarks are named for Boehlert that reflect his work on transportation and science issues. These include the renovated Union Station in Utica and the new science facilities of the Air Force Research Laboratory—Information Directorate in Rome, New York.

=== Committee assignments ===
Boehlert served on the Science Committee for his entire congressional career. In addition, he was the third-ranking member of the Transportation Committee; from 1995 to 2000, he served as the chairman of its Subcommittee on Water Resources and Environment. He was also a member of the House Permanent Select Committee on Intelligence, serving as interim chairman in 2004.

== Post-congressional career ==
After 2007, Boehlert remained active promoting environmental and scientific causes. He served on the Board of the bipartisan Alliance for Climate Protection chaired by former Vice President Al Gore. Boehlert served as a Senior Fellow at the Bipartisan Policy Center. He was a member of the ReFormers Caucus of Issue One.

In 2016, Boehlert endorsed Democratic candidate Hillary Clinton for president, and in 2018, he endorsed Democratic candidate Anthony Brindisi for New York's 22nd congressional district, which contained much of Boehlert's former district.

== Death ==
Boehlert died from complications of dementia at a hospice care facility in New Hartford, New York, on September 20, 2021, at age 84. His Funeral Mass was held at Our Lady of Lourdes, Utica, New York, on September 27, 2021.

U.S. House of Representatives
Preceded by Hamilton Fish IV	Member of the U.S. House of Representatives from New York's 25th congressional district 1983–1993	Succeeded by James T. Walsh
Preceded by Michael R. McNulty	Member of the U.S. House of Representatives from New York's 23rd congressional district 1993–2003	Succeeded by John M. McHugh
Preceded by Jim Sensenbrenner	Chair of the House Science Committee; 2001–2007	Succeeded by Bart Gordon
Preceded by John M. McHugh	Member of the U.S. House of Representatives from New York's 24th congressional district 2003–2007	Succeeded by Mike Arcuri
