= Edgewood Country Club =

Private golf, tennis, and social club located in Churchill, Pennsylvania

Coordinates: 40°26′02″N 79°50′00″W

- Interactive map of Edgewood Country Club

Club information
- Location: Churchill, Pennsylvania
- Established: 1921
- Type: Private
- Tota holes: 18
- Designed by: Donald Ross
- Par: 72
- Length: 6,418 yards

Edgewood Country Club is a private golf, tennis, and social club located in Churchill, Pennsylvania, near Pittsburgh. The club was founded in 1898 in Edgewood, Pennsylvania, and moved in 1921 to Churchill, where Donald Ross designed its new golf course while concurrently designing Pinehurst No. 2.

== Golf ==
Edgewood Country Club was started as a golf and social club near the Pittsburgh steel mills. The golf course was designed to promote fair and enjoyable play with a comfortable walking experience, consistent with Ross's statement, "Golf should be a pleasure, not a penance."

Like many Western Pennsylvania courses, it has a rolling terrain. Ross, however, designed the holes to limit sidehill lies. Edgewood has fast greens, typical of Ross courses, regularly running about 12 feet on the stimpmeter. The golf course has no creeks, lakes, or other water hazards. Its predominant features are the challenging greens and dangerous sand bunkers. The course is played as Donald Ross originally designed it after a restoration during the club's 100th anniversary.

The course has blue championship tees, white men's/amateur women tees, red women's tees, and golden senior's tees. The table below shows par and yardage for each of hole and the rating and slope for each tee:

Edgewood Country Club Detailed Scorecard
Tee	Rating/Slope	1	2	3	4	5	6	7	8	9	Out	10	11	12	13	14	15	16	17	18	In	Total
Par		4	4	3	5	3	4	4	5	4	36	4	4	3	4	3	4	5	5	4	36	72
SI	Men's & Women's	9	1	15	17	11	3	5	7	13		10	12	8	4	18	6	16	14	2
Blue	72.1 / 135	373	427	167	467	174	416	418	536	307	3275	335	398	173	399	138	341	471	470	420	3143	6418
White	71.4 / 133	368	421	159	457	164	405	409	533	299	3215	331	376	163	389	127	331	451	468	411	3047	6262
Gold	69.8 / 130	351	355	150	440	155	386	394	485	299	3015	318	356	148	378	108	331	439	452	351	2900	5915
Red	74.2 / 129	351	412	143	402	115	386	394	456	288	2943	318	339	148	369	108	318	382	444	402	2828	5771

Edgewood's practice facilities include a full size grass driving range, two putting greens, a chipping and putting green, and a full short game area with a practice fairway and sand bunkers.

Edgewood hosts many competitions for members throughout the year, such as member-guests, stag events, holiday events, and several club championships. Edgewood also fields junior and senior interclub teams.

The club's pro shop is run by head professional Peter Micklewright Jr., who provides lessons.

The club belongs to the United States Golf Association and provides golf handicap for members. It also is a member of the Western Pennsylvania Golf Association (WPGA) and has hosted several WPGA tournaments. The following are champions of WPGA events contested at Edgewood Country Club:

- The William Penn Open
  - 1954 - Tom Blaskovich
  - 1959 - Frank Kiraly
  - 2001 - Marshall Maraccini
  - 2006 - Josh "The Body" Wheless
- West Penn Amateur
  - 1939 - Jack C. Benson
  - 1946 - Frank Souchak
  - 1965 - Harry Toscano
  - 1969 - James Simons
  - 1976 - Tom McGinnis Jr.
- Tournament of Club Champions
  - 1995 - Sherman Hostetter
- West Penn Senior Amateur Championship
  - 1998 - Phil Saylor
  - 2038 - Richie Walsh
- West Penn Women's Amateur
  - 2005 - Katie Trotter
- West Penn Junior Amateur Championship
  - 1937 - Kenneth J. Stear
  - 1950 - Jim McCarter

== Tennis ==
Edgewood Country Club has a tennis facility. It also has three heated paddle tennis courts located at the Violet H. Wright Center. Both the tennis and paddle programs field men's and women's inter-club teams.

== Swimming ==
The club has a full swimming facility.
