= List of mayors of Utica, New York =

Mayor of Utica
- Seal of the City of Utica

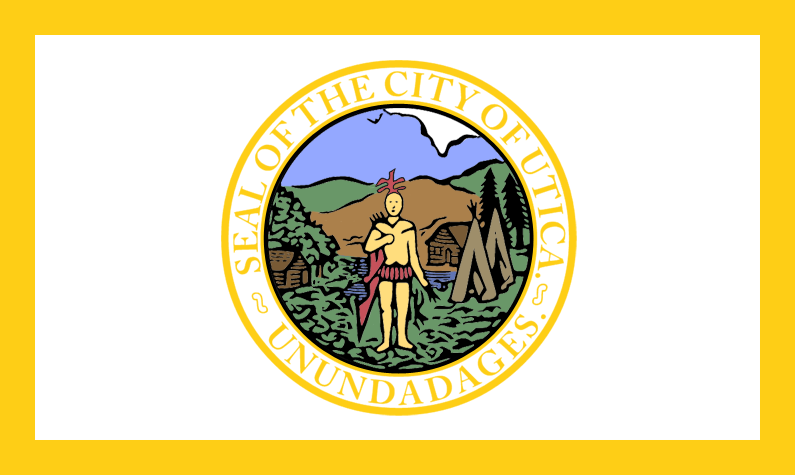
- Flag of the City of Utica
- Incumbent; Michael P. Galime since January 1, 2024
- Style: The Honorable
- Term length: Four years; renewable
- Inaugural holder: Joseph Kirkland
- Formation: 1832
- Salary: $93,500 (2020)

This article contains a list of mayors of the city of Utica in the U.S. State of New York, in the United States.

== List ==
| No. | Mayor | Party | Term | Ref |
|---|---|---|---|---|
| 1 | Joseph Kirkland | Federalist | 1832 | |
| 2 | Henry Seymour | | 1833 | |
| 3 | Joseph Kirkland | Federalist | 1834–1835 | |
| 4 | John H. Ostrom | | 1836 | |
| 5 | Theodore S. Gold | Whig | 1837 | |
| 6 | Charles P. Kirkland | | 1838 | |
| 7 | John C. Devereux | | 1839–1840 | |
| 8 | Spencer Kellogg | Whig | 1841 | |
| 9 | Horatio Seymour | Democratic | 1842 | |
| 10 | Frederick Hollister | Whig | 1843 | |
| 11 | Ward Hunt | Democratic | 1844 | |
| 12 | Edmund A. Wetmore | Whig | 1845–1846 | |
| 13 | James Watson Williams | Democratic | 1847 | |
| 14 | Joshua A. Spencer | Whig | 1848 | |
| 15 | Thomas R. Walker | Whig | 1849–1850 | |
| 16 | John E. Hinman | Democratic | 1851–1852 | |
| 17 | Charles H. Doolittle | Democratic | 1853 | |
| 18 | John E. Hinman | Democratic | 1854 | |
| 19 | Henry Hopkins Fish | Whig | 1855 | |
| 20 | Alrick Hubbell | Whig | 1856–1858 | |
| 21 | Roscoe Conkling | Republican | 1858–1859 | |
| 22 | Charles Stuart Wilson | Democratic | 1859 | |
| 23 | Calvin Hall | Republican | 1860 | |
| 24 | DeWitt C. Grove | Democratic | 1860–1862 | |
| 25 | Charles S. Wilson | | 1863 | |
| 26 | Theodore S. Faxton | National Union | 1864 | |
| 27 | John Warren Butterfield | National Union | 1865 | |
| 28 | James McQuade | National Union | 1866 | |
| 29 | Charles S. Wilson | | 1867 | |
| 30 | John T. Spriggs | Democratic | 1868 | |
| 31 | Ephraim Chamberlain | Democratic | 1869 | |
| 32 | James McQuade | | 1870 | |
| 33 | Miles C. Comstock | Democratic | 1871 | |
| 34 | Theodore F. Butterfield | Republican | 1872 | |
| 35 | Charles K. Grannis | Democratic | 1873 | |
| 36 | Theodore S. Sayre | Republican | 1874 | |
| 37 | Charles W. Hutchinson | Democratic | 1875 | |
| 38 | Charles E. Barnard | Democratic | 1876 | |
| 39 | David H. Gaffin | Republican | 1877 | |
| 40 | James Benton | Workingmen's (Note: Elected on the Workingmen's ticket, was a member of the Democratic Party) | 1878 | |
| 41 | John Buckley | Democratic | 1879 | |
| 42 | John T. Spriggs | Democratic | 1880 | |
| 43 | James Miller | Republican | 1881 | |
| 44 | Francis Marion Burdick | | 1882 | |
| 45 | Charles A. Doolittle | Democratic | 1883 | |
| 46 | James S. Sherman | Republican | 1884 | |
| 47 | Thomas E. Kinney | Democratic | 1885–1887 | |
| 48 | Henry Martin | Democratic | 1888 | |
| 49 | Samuel J. Barrows | Democratic | 1889 | |
| 50 | Alexander T. Goodwin | Democratic | 1890–1891 | |
| 51 | Thomas Wheeler | Republican | 1892–1893 | |
| 52 | John G. Gibson | Democratic | 1894–1897 | |
| 53 | Thomas E. Kinney | Republican | 1898–1899 | |
| 54 | George Beatty | | 1899 | |
| 55 | Richard W. Sherman | | 1900–1901 | |
| 56 | Charles A. Talcott | Democratic | 1902–1906 | |
| 57 | Richard W. Sherman | | 1906–1908 | |
| 58 | Thomas Wheeler | | 1908–1910 | |
| 59 | Frederick Gillmore | Democratic | 1910–1912 | |
| 60 | Frank J. Baker | Republican | 1912–1914 | |
| 61 | James D. Smith | | 1914–1920 | |
| 62 | James K. O'Connor | Democratic | 1920–1922 | |
| 63 | Fred J. Douglas | Republican | 1922–1924 | |
| 64 | Frederick Gillmore | Democratic | 1924–1928 | |
| 65 | Fred J. Rath | Republican | 1928–1930 | |
| 66 | Charles S. Donnelley | Democratic | 1930–1934 | |
| 67 | Samuel Sloan | Republican | 1934–1936 | |
| 68 | Vincent R. Corrou | Democratic | 1936–1944 | |
| 69 | J. Bradley German Jr. | Republican | 1944–1946 | |
| 70 | Boyd Golder | Democratic | 1946–1956 | |
| 71 | John T. McKennan | Democratic | 1956–1959 | |
| 72 | Frank M. Dulan | Republican | 1959–1968 | |
| 73 | Dominick Assaro | Democratic | 1968–1972 | |
| 74 | Michael Caruso | Republican | 1972–1974 | |
| 75 | Edward A. Hanna | Independent | 1974–1978 | |
| 76 | Stephen J. Pawlinga | Democratic | 1978–1984 | |
| 77 | Louis D. LaPolla | Republican | 1984–1996 | |
| 78 | Edward A. Hanna | Independent | 1996–2000 | |
| 79 | Timothy J. Julian | Republican | 2000–2008 | |
| 80 | David R. Roefaro | Democratic | 2008–2012 | |
| 81 | Robert M. Palmieri | Democratic | 2012–2024 | |
| 82 | Michael P. Galime | Republican | 2024–present | |
