= Fort Schuyler Club =

- Fort Schuyler Club Building
- U.S. National Register of Historic Places
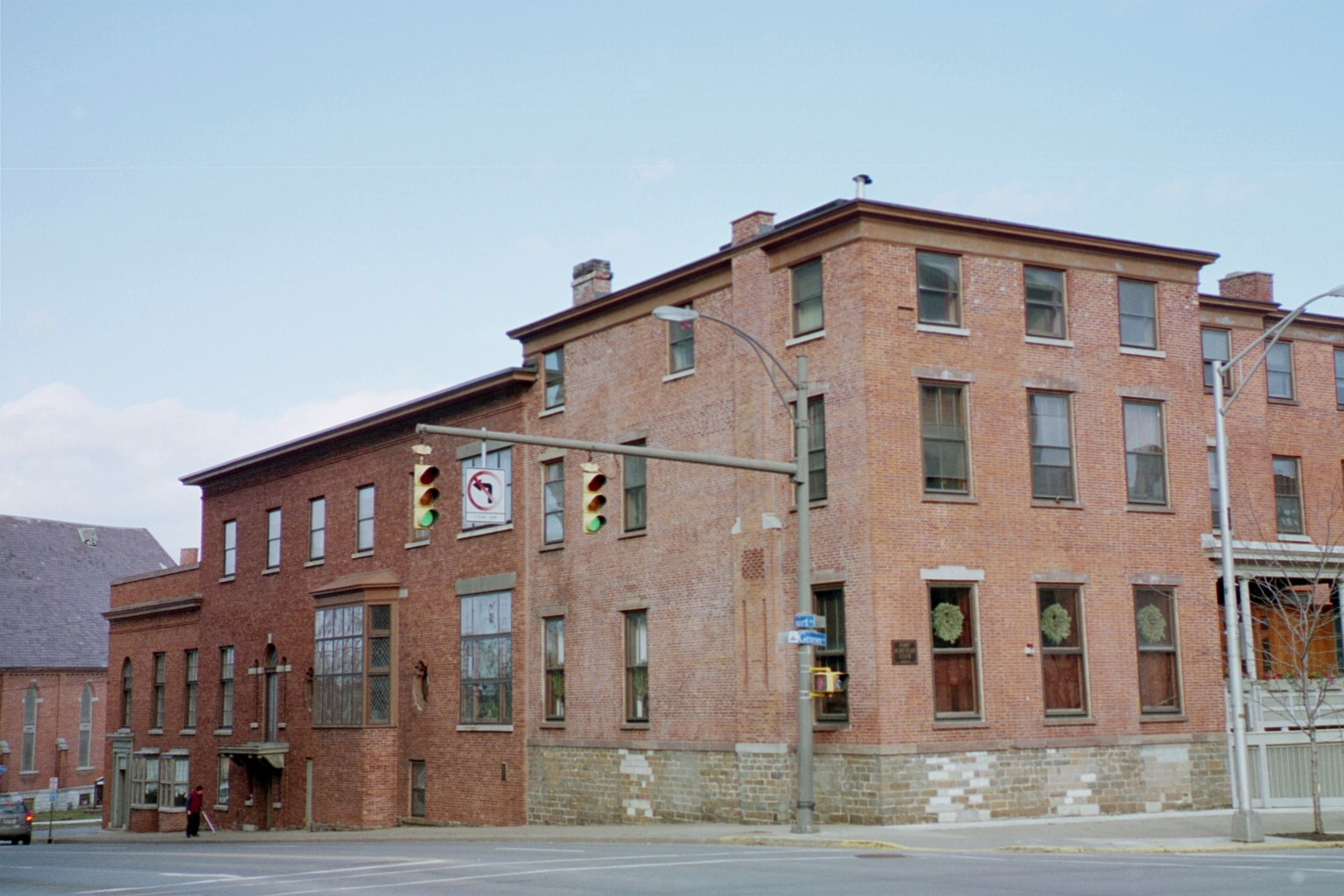

- Location within New York Location within the United States
- Location: 254 Genesee Street, Utica, New York
- Coordinates: 43°5′59″N 75°14′7″W
- Built: 1830
- Architectural style: Federal
- NRHP reference No.: 04000436
- Added to NRHP: May 12, 2004

The Fort Schuyler Club, founded in 1883, is a private members' club located in downtown Utica, New York, USA. Early members of the club included Elihu Root, Francis Kernan, Horatio Seymour, Charlemagne Tower, and Ward Hunt.

The club's clubhouse is "significant as a rare and substantially intact example of a late 19th-early 20th century social club" in downtown Utica. The building, built in stages from 1830 on, is a landmark located prominently on Genesee Street, the "principal thoroughfare" of Utica. First used as a residence, the club purchased the building in 1883, shortly after its establishment. It was listed on the U.S. National Register of Historic Places in 2004.

It operates under US law for 501(c)(7) Social and Recreation Clubs. In 2024 it claimed total revenue of $914,870 and total assets of $852,116.

== See also ==
- List of city clubs in the United States
