= Natale H. Bellocchi =

American industrial engineer and diplomat (1926-2014)

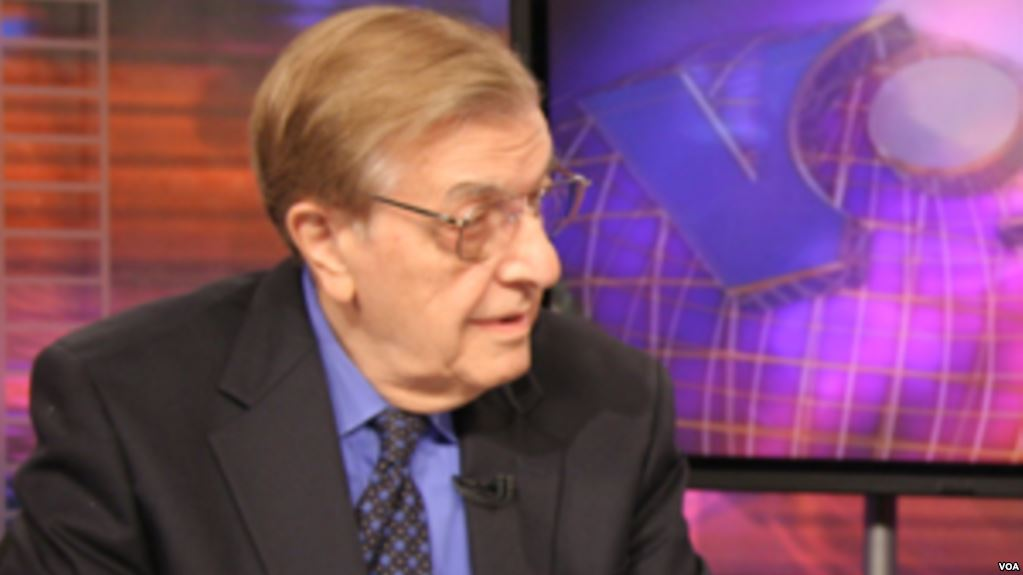

United States Ambassador to Botswana
- In office 1985–1988
- Preceded by: Theodore C. Maino
- Succeeded by: John Florian Kordek

Personal details
- Born: Natale Hans Bellocchi; July 5, 1926 Little Falls, New York, U.S.
- Died: November 17, 2014 (aged 88) Bethesda, Maryland, U.S.
- Resting place: Arlington National Cemetery
- Education: Georgia Institute of Technology (Bachelor's, 1948); Edmund A. Walsh School of Foreign Service (Master's, 1954)
- Occupation: Industrial engineer, diplomat
- Military career
- Allegiance: United States
- Branch: United States Army
- Service years: 1950–1953
- Units: Second Infantry Division, 23rd Infantry, Company A
- Conflicts: Korean War

Natale Hans Bellocchi (July 5, 1926 – November 17, 2014) was an American industrial engineer, a Korean War United States Army veteran, and United States diplomat. He served for years as a diplomatic courier and Foreign Service Officer, with numerous postings to nations in Asia, where he encouraged trade and commerce, and as ambassador to Botswana.

== Early life and education ==
Natale Hans Bellocchi was born into an ethnic Italian family in 1926 in Little Falls, New York; his parents were Pietro and Marianna (Fenni) Bellocchi. He had an older sister Elsie Bellochhi. After their father died during the Great Depression when Natale was 12, the family had strict finances, but were helped by relatives and friends in the Italian community.

Bellocchi attended the public high school. Disappointed at being rejected in 1944 for the draft, he went away to college. He earned his bachelor's degree in industrial management from Georgia Institute of Technology in 1948.

== Career ==
Bellochi started his career as an industrial engineer for Burlington Mills in Allentown, Pennsylvania, thinking he might have an opportunity to go into international business. It was interrupted by the Korean War, and this time he was accepted in the draft. He served in the United States Army from 1950 to 1953, going to Officer Candidate School after basic training, and being assigned to the Second Infantry Division, 23rd Infantry, Company A.

His experiences changed his goals and, after the war, Bellocchi returned to graduate school on the GI Bill to prepare for an international career. In 1954, he received his master's degree from the Edmund A. Walsh School of Foreign Service of Georgetown University.

Bellocchi joined the United States Foreign Service in 1955, first serving as a diplomatic courier. He did a lot of travel by airplane in more difficult conditions than today, including having a plane go down at sea. He and other couriers traveled 100–150 hours per month, with little time for more than changing clothes in between flights. He was also stationed in Manila and Hong Kong. He returned to Europe for two years, where he frequently traveled behind the Iron Curtain. After finally being selected as a Foreign Service Officer (FSO), Bellocchi chose to serve in Asia.

He was initially stationed in Laos and Taiwan, after a period, from 1963 to 1965, of attending Chinese language school on Taiwan. This intense training required of classroom instruction, independent study and regular immersion in Chinese-only villages. In Hong Kong again from 1968 to 1970, he worked on business affairs and started an American Chamber of Commerce, during the period when mainland China was in the throes of the Cultural Revolution. In an interview later in his life, he discussed this as the period when American businesses started establishing their own offices and a professional managerial class in Hong Kong. He also worked in Vietnam, India, and Japan.

After a variety of postings in Asia, Bellocchi worked for the State Department's Bureau of Intelligence and Research in Washington, DC.

In 1985, Bellocchi was appointed ambassador to Botswana, serving until 1988. From 1990 to 1995, Bellocchi was chairman of the American Institute in Taiwan.

Bellochi and his family returned to the United States when he retired. He died in Bethesda, Maryland, of heart disease on November 17, 2014. A funeral was held in December 2015, at Arlington National Cemetery.

== Marriage and family ==
Bellochi married Lilan Liu. They had two children together.

Diplomatic posts
Preceded by Theodore C. Maino	United States Ambassador to Botswana; 1985–1988	Succeeded by John Florian Kordek
