= The Africa Center =

Museum in Manhattan, New York

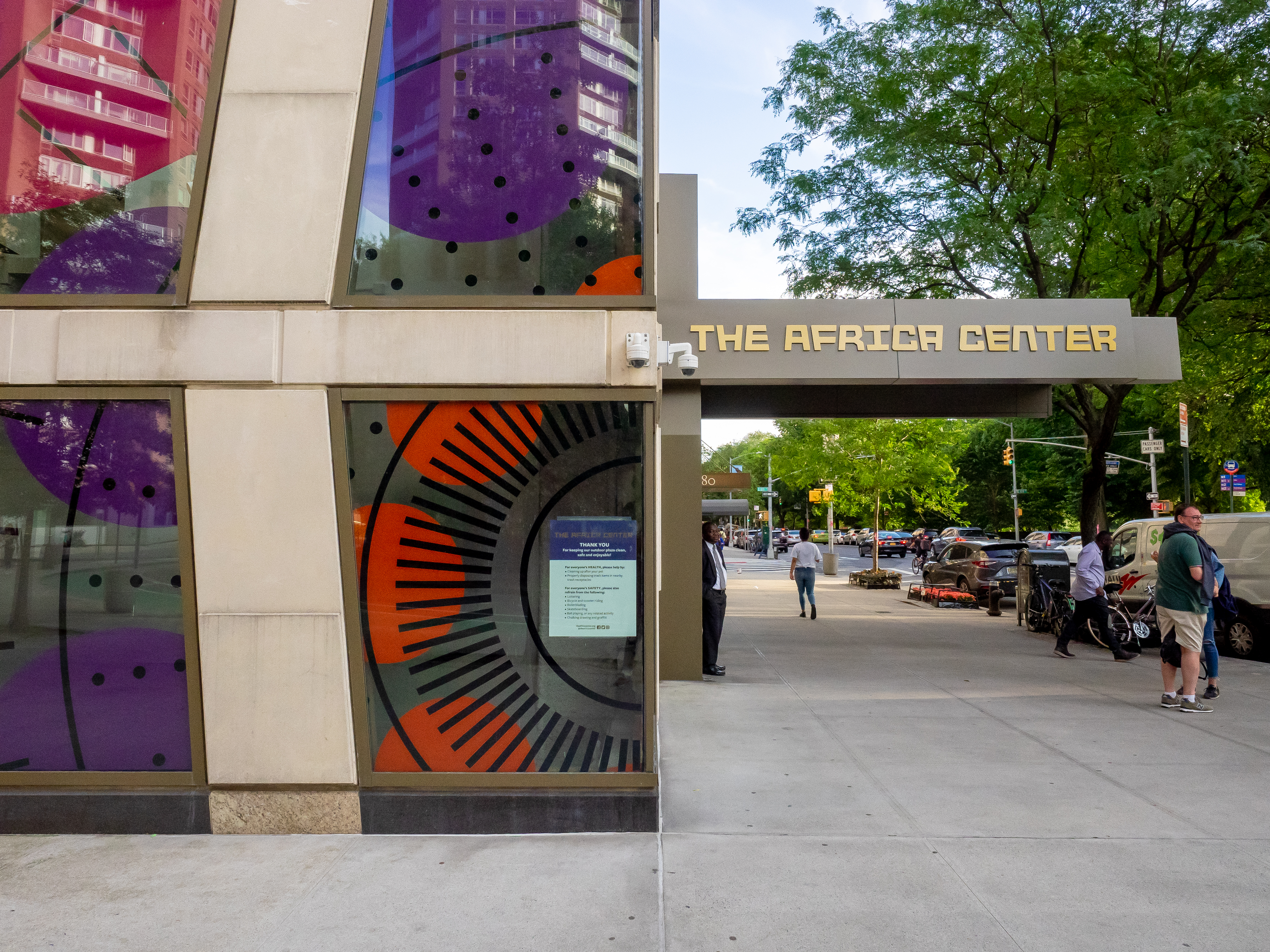
- Museum entrance on Fifth Avenue
- Former names: Center for African Art; Museum for African Art
- Established: September 1984
- Location: 1280 Fifth Avenue; New York, NY 10029; U.S.
- Coordinates: 40°47′47″N 73°56′57″W
- Public transit access: New York City Subway: 110th Street; 110th Street–Malcolm X Plaza; New York City Bus: M1, M2, M3, M4, M106 buses
- Website: www.theafricacenter.org

The Africa Center, formerly known as the Museum for African Art and before that as the Center for African Art, is a museum located at Fifth Avenue and 110th Street in East Harlem, Manhattan, New York City, near the northern end of Fifth Avenue's Museum Mile. Founded in 1984, the museum is "dedicated to increasing public understanding and appreciation of African art and culture." The Museum is also well known for its public education programs that help raise awareness of African culture, and also operates a unique store selling authentic handmade African crafts.

The Museum has organized nearly 60 critically acclaimed exhibitions and traveled these to almost 140 venues nationally and internationally, including 15 other countries. Forty of these exhibitions are accompanied by scholarly catalogues.

== History ==
Holland Cotter wrote in 2010 about what is now the Africa Center, "In the 1980s and '90s it revolutionized the way art, any art, could be exhibited. No one else has fully picked up that challenge since. Maybe the museum itself, under wraps the last few years, can do so again."

=== 1984–1993: Early years ===
What is now the Africa Center was opened as the Center for African Art in September 1984 by its founding director, Susan Mullin Vogel, who had previously worked as Associate Curator in the "Department of Primitive Art" at the Metropolitan Museum of Art. The center's original location was on the Upper East Side of Manhattan, in "a pair of converted town houses at 54 East 68th Street." As director, Vogel curated and organized ground-breaking exhibitions which put into question ways in which African art is presented to Western audiences, and how museum practices structure knowledge for the public. The most well-known of these exhibitions are "Art/Artifact: African Art in Anthropology Collections" in 1988, "Exhibition-ism: Museums and African Art" in 1994, and "Africa Explores: 20th Century African Art" in 1991. Based largely on Vogel's earlier exhibitions, Roberta Smith wrote in The New York Times in 1989 that the 1980s "may also come to be seen as the beginning of the golden age of African art exhibitions."

=== 1993–2002: SoHo ===
In February 1993, the institution changed its name to the Museum for African Art and moved to a three-times larger space at 593 Broadway in Soho, that was designed by the architect and artist Maya Lin and described by New York Times architecture critic Herbert Muschamp as "a flowing sequence of galleries, unfolding on two floors," in which Lin "uses subtle gradations of color to suggest a passage through time as well as space." After founding director Vogel was named director of the Yale University Art Gallery in 1994, Grace C. Stanislaus was named as executive director in February 1995. Elsie McCabe (later Elsie McCabe Thompson) led the institution from 1997 until she resigned in 2012. When McCabe took over, she "set her sights on moving the tiny museum and collection" from Soho to uptown Manhattan, saying (ironically given that she moved the museum to its third and fourth locations), "A museum is very much an edifice, and you can't attract a loyal and dedicated audience if you're constantly on the move."

=== 2002–2006: Long Island City ===
In September 2002, the museum moved to its third location, at 36–01 43rd Avenue, third floor, in Long Island City, Queens, intended as "an interim home before a permanent move to 110th Street and Fifth Avenue in Manhattan," a site that in 2002 was expected to be ready "within four years or so." In 2005, the museum was among 406 New York City arts and social service institutions to receive part of a $20 million grant from the Carnegie Corporation, which was made possible through a donation by New York City mayor Michael Bloomberg. The Museum closed its public gallery in Queens in 2006, and in 2013 the board changed its name to the New Africa Center, which later became the Africa Center, and changed its intended purpose from art museum to "a clearinghouse and public policy institute for all things Africa." After several years of delayed openings, and the realization that the initial goal of a museum on Fifth Avenue was not sustainable, the decision was made to broaden the project's scope, and push back the opening to 2015. The new building would be on Museum Mile at the corner of Fifth Avenue and East 110th Street in East Harlem, Manhattan.

=== 2006–present: Museum Mile ===
The new location, in a building designed by architect Robert A.M. Stern, is the first museum building built on New York's Museum Mile since the completion of the Guggenheim in 1959. It was to serve as a cultural center, modeling itself after the Asia Society and other similar organizations. The new building's aim was to make the museum accessible to a wide range of people from the world over, thus solidifying the museum's presence as one of the most challenging and diverse art institutions in the U.S. The new building would encompass approximately 90,000 square feet (8,400 m^{2}) with 16,000 square feet (1,500 m^{2}) of exhibition space, as well as a theater, education center, library, classrooms, event space, restaurant and gift shop. The growth into the cultural center was spearheaded by, CEO Uzodinma Iweala and board members Chelsea Clinton, Halima Dangote, and Hadeel Ibrahim daughter of Mo Ibrahim.

While the outer-shell of the building was completed in 2010, critical interior build-out and occupation was delayed by stalled fundraising efforts and leadership transitions. In 2015, the Africa Center hired Michelle D. Gavin, former United States Ambassador to Botswana and an expert on Africa, as its managing director. Gavin left in late 2016. In the interim, the Africa Center was to present pop up events in its new space until the building is completed. In February 2019, Terenga, a West African fast-casual restaurant, opened in the Africa Center space. Martin Kimani was appointed President and CEO in 2025.

The Africa Center also hosts a Shared Studios Portal, which connects the center live and in real-time to communities around the world. The majority of their Portal connections are to sites on the African continent.

== See also ==
- List of museums and cultural institutions in New York City
