= List of ambassadors of the United States to Botswana =

Ambassador of the United States to Botswana
- Seal of the United States Department of State

- Flag of a United States ambassador

- Incumbent; Christopher J. Gunning; Chargé d'affaires since 26 August 2026
- Nominator: The president of the United States
- Appointer: The president; with Senate advice and consent
- Inaugural holder: Charles H. Pletcher as Chargé d'Affaires
- Formation: September 1966
- Website: U.S. Embassy - Gaborone

From 1885 until 1966 the area of Southern Africa that is now Botswana was part of the Bechuanaland Protectorate of Great Britain.

In June 1964, Britain accepted proposals for democratic self-government in Botswana. The seat of government was moved from Mahikeng in South Africa, to newly established in Gaberones (now Gaborone) in 1965. The 1965 constitution led to the first general elections and to independence on 30 September 1966.

The United States immediately recognized the new nation and moved to establish diplomatic relations. An embassy in Gaberones was established on 30 September 1966—independence day for Botswana. Charles H. Pletcher was appointed as Chargé d'affaires ad interim pending the appointment of an ambassador. He served June 1970–September 1971.

== Ambassadors ==
- Note: Charles H. Pletcher served as chargé d'affaires September 1966–June 1970. W. Kennedy Cromwell III

Name	Title	Appointed	Presented credentials	Terminated mission	Notes
Charles J. Nelson – Political appointee (Note: Accredited to Botswana, Eswatini, and Lesotho.)	Ambassador Extraordinary and Plenipotentiary	9 June 1971	3 November 1971	Left Gaborone, 2 March 1974	
David B. Bolen – Career FSO	Ambassador Extraordinary and Plenipotentiary	28 February 1974	22 April 1974	Left Gaborone, 11 August 1976	
Donald R. Norland – Career FSO (Note: Norland was commissioned during a recess of the Senate and recommissioned after confirmation on 24 June 1977.)	Ambassador Extraordinary and Plenipotentiary	17 November 1976	23 February 1978	Left Gaborone, 8 September 1979	In 1979 the first ambassador was appointed solely for Botswana.
Horace Dawson – Career FSO	Ambassador Extraordinary and Plenipotentiary	12 October 1979	27 November 1979	27 August 1982	
Theodore C. Maino – Political appointee	Ambassador Extraordinary and Plenipotentiary	30 September 1982	2 December 1982	6 September 1985	
Natale H. Bellocchi – Career FSO	Ambassador Extraordinary and Plenipotentiary	28 October 1985	19 November 1985	16 September 1988	
John Florian Kordek – Career FSO	Ambassador Extraordinary and Plenipotentiary	11 August 1988	29 September 1988	1 November 1989	
David Passage – Career FSO	Ambassador Extraordinary and Plenipotentiary	27 June 1990	7 August 1990	29 April 1993	
Howard Franklin Jeter – Career FSO	Ambassador Extraordinary and Plenipotentiary	16 July 1993	9 September 1993	21 June 1996	
Robert Krueger – Political appointee	Ambassador Extraordinary and Plenipotentiary	6 June 1996	23 July 1996	6 December 1999	
John E. Lange – Career FSO	Ambassador Extraordinary and Plenipotentiary	16 November 1999	15 December 1999	8 August 2002	
Joseph Huggins – Career FSO	Ambassador Extraordinary and Plenipotentiary	15 November 2002	28 January 2003	26 July 2005	
Katherine H. P. Canavan – Career FSO	Ambassador Extraordinary and Plenipotentiary	2 August 2005	27 September 2005	27 June 2008	
Stephen J. Nolan – Career FSO	Ambassador Extraordinary and Plenipotentiary	23 June 2008	6 October 2008	13 June 2011	
Michelle D. Gavin – Political appointee	Ambassador Extraordinary and Plenipotentiary	18 April 2011	20 June 2011	22 February 2014	
Earl Robert Miller – Foreign Service Specialist	Ambassador Extraordinary and Plenipotentiary	December 2014	18 December 2014	24 September 2018	
Craig L. Cloud - Career FSO	Ambassador Extraordinary and Plenipotentiary	7 January 2019	2 April 2019	24 May 2022	
Howard Van Vranken - Career FSO	Ambassador Extraordinary and Plenipotentiary	21 December 2022	24 May 2023	26 August 2026	
Christopher J. Gunning - Career FSO	Chargé d'affaires ad interim	26 August 2026		Present	

== See also ==
- Botswana–United States relations
- Foreign relations of Botswana
- Ambassadors of the United States
