= Botswana–United States relations =

- Botswana: United States

Diplomatic mission
- Embassy of Botswana, Washington, D.C.: U.S. Embassy in Botswana, Gaborone

Envoy
- Ambassador of Botswana to the United States Kitso Mokaila: Ambassador of the United States to Botswana Howard Van Vranken

Botswana–United States relations are the bilateral relations between Botswana and the United States.

According to the 2024 U.S. Global Leadership Report, 46% of Botswana people approve of U.S. leadership, with 27% disapproving and 26% uncertain. In the 2012 report, it was one of the most U.S. approving countries at 79%.

Botswana and the US state of Hawaii are antipodes.

== United States aid to Botswana ==
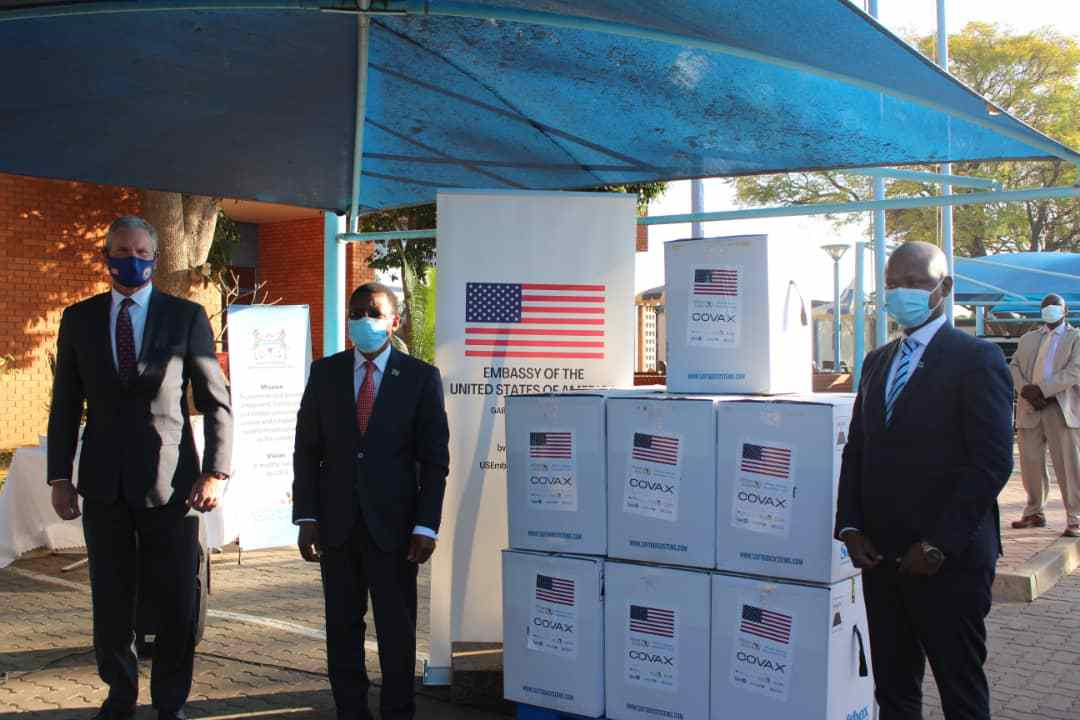
The US delivers Pfizer–BioNTech COVID-19 vaccines to Botswana as part of the COVAX program in 2021

The United States considers Botswana an advocate of and a model for stability in Africa and has been a major partner in Botswana's development since its independence. The U.S. Peace Corps returned to Botswana in August 2002 with a focus on HIV/AIDS-related programs after concluding 30 years of more broadly targeted assistance in 1997. Similarly, the USAID phased out a longstanding bilateral partnership with Botswana in 1996, after successful programs emphasizing education, training, entrepreneurship, environmental management, and reproductive health. Botswana, however, continues to benefit along with its neighbors in the region from USAID's Initiative for Southern Africa, now based in Pretoria, and USAID's Southern Africa Global Competitiveness Hub, headquartered in Gaborone. The United States International Board of Broadcasters (IBB) operates a major Voice of America (VOA) relay station in Botswana serving most of the African continent.

In 1995, the Centers for Disease Control (CDC) started the BOTUSA Project in collaboration with the Botswana Ministry of Health in order to generate information to improve tuberculosis control efforts in Botswana and elsewhere in the face of the TB and HIV/AIDS co-epidemics. Under the 1999 U.S. Government's Leadership and Investment in Fighting an Epidemic (LIFE) Initiative, CDC through the BOTUSA Project has undertaken projects and has assisted organizations in the struggle against the HIV/AIDS epidemic in Botswana. Botswana is one of the 15 focus countries for PEPFAR, the President's Emergency Plan for Aids Relief, and has received more than $556 million since the program began in January 2004 through September 2011. PEPFAR assistance to Botswana, which totaled $84.4 million in FY 2011, is contributing to HIV/AIDS prevention, treatment, and care interventions.

In 2025, an orphanage in Botswana was shut down as a result of the USAID funding stoppage.

== Agreements ==
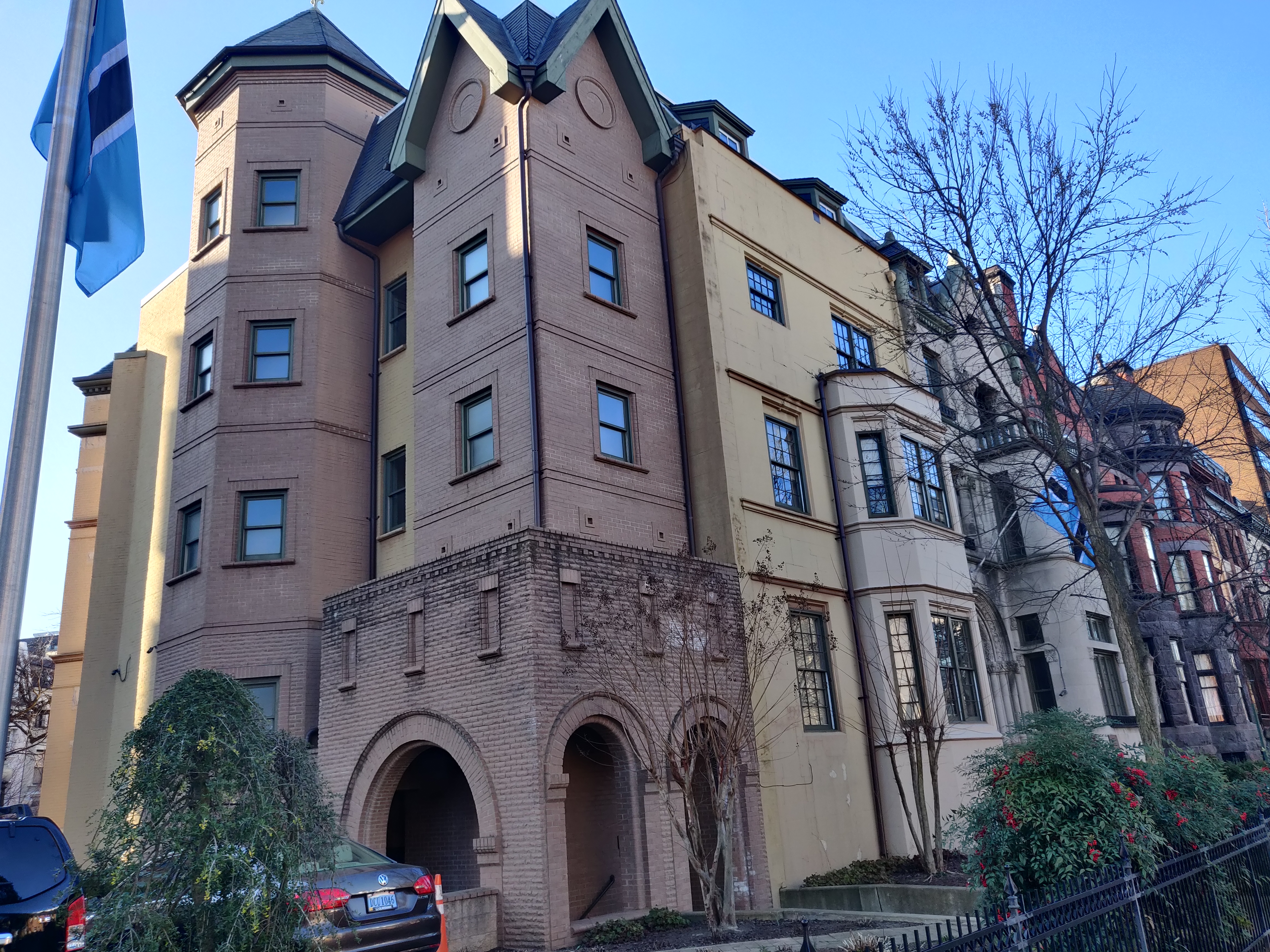
Embassy of Botswana in Washington, D.C.

The Governments of Botswana and the United States entered into an agreement in July 2000 to establish an International Law Enforcement Academy (ILEA) in Gaborone. The academy, jointly financed, managed and staffed by the two nations, provides training to police and government officials from across the Sub-Saharan region. The academy's permanent campus, in Otse outside of Gaborone, opened March 2003. Over 3,000 law enforcement professionals from Sub-Saharan Africa have received training from ILEA since it began offering classes in 2001.

== Principal U.S. Officials ==
- Ambassador — Howard Van Vranken since May 2023

== Diplomatic missions ==
The U.S. Embassy is in Gaborone. OSC (previously ODC) is located at the embassy. CDC is located on Ditlhakore Way in Gaborone. ILEA is located in Otse, about 30 minutes outside of Gaborone. The IBB station is located in Selebi-Phikwe, about 400 kilometers northeast of Gaborone.

Botswana has an embassy in Washington, D.C.

== See also ==
- Foreign relations of Botswana
- Foreign relations of the United States
