= Little Falls Historic District =

Historic district in New York, United States

- U.S. National Register of Historic Places
- U.S. Historic district
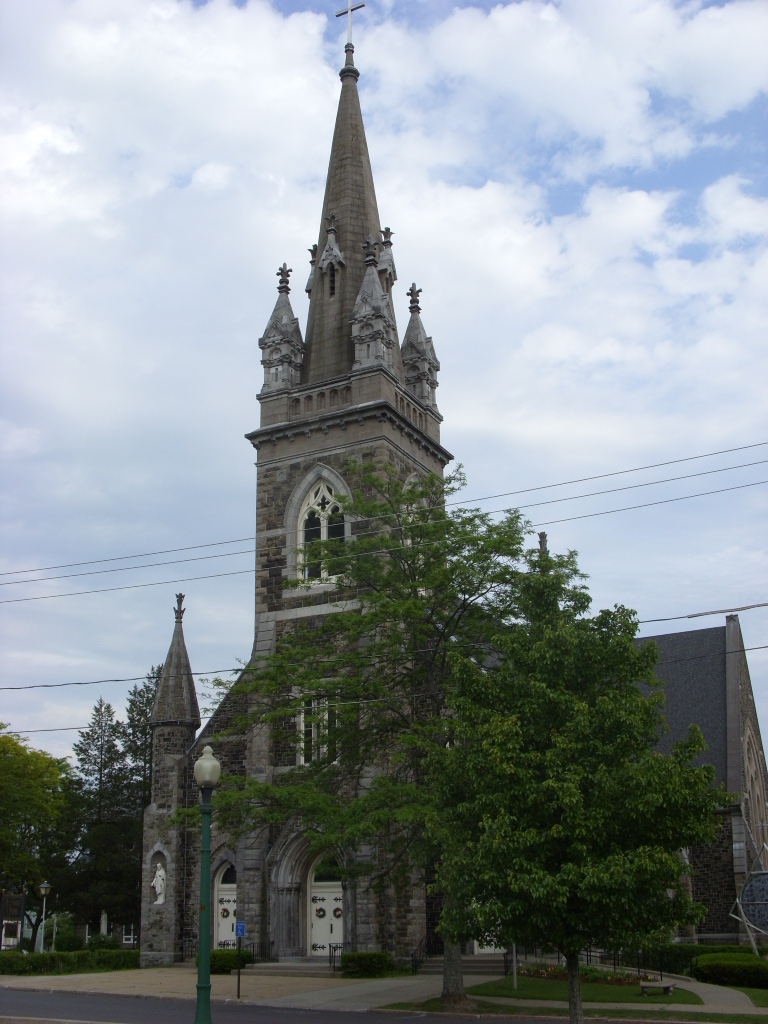
- St. Mary's Catholic Church, June 2009

- Location within New York Location within the United States
- Nearest city: Roughly bounded by W. Monroe, W. Gansevoort, Prospect, Garden, E. Main, N. William, & Loomis St., Little Falls, New York
- Coordinates: 43°02′36″N 74°51′35″W
- Area: 91.16 acres (36.89 ha)
- Architectural style: Italianate, Federal, Greek Revival, Second Empire, Queen Anne, Colonial Revival
- NRHP reference No.: 12000013
- Added to NRHP: February 8, 2012

Little Falls Historic District is a national historic district located at Little Falls in Herkimer County, New York. The district includes 347 contributing buildings in Little Falls. The buildings date from the mid-19th to the early-20th century. There are a number of Italianate-style commercial buildings and notable residences in popular 19th-century architectural styles including Federal, Greek Revival, Italianate, Second Empire, Queen Anne, and Colonial Revival. Notable non-residential buildings include the Masonic Temple (1914), East Park Elementary School, Public Library, and St. Mary's Catholic Church Complex. The separately listed James Sanders House is located in the district.

It was listed on the National Register of Historic Places in 2012. The Herkimer County Trust Company Building and James Sanders House are located in the district and are separately listed.

== Photos ==
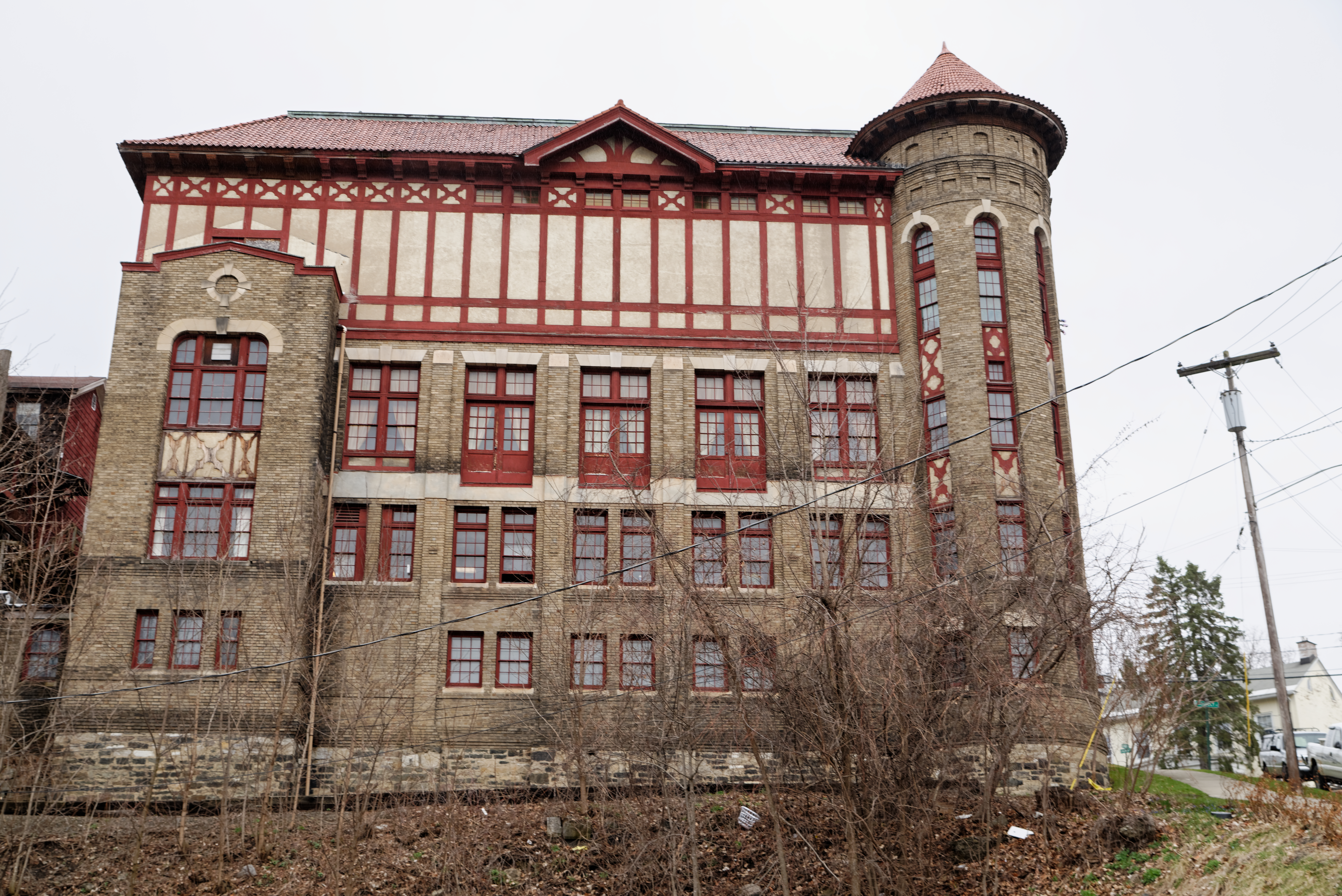
Rome DDSO

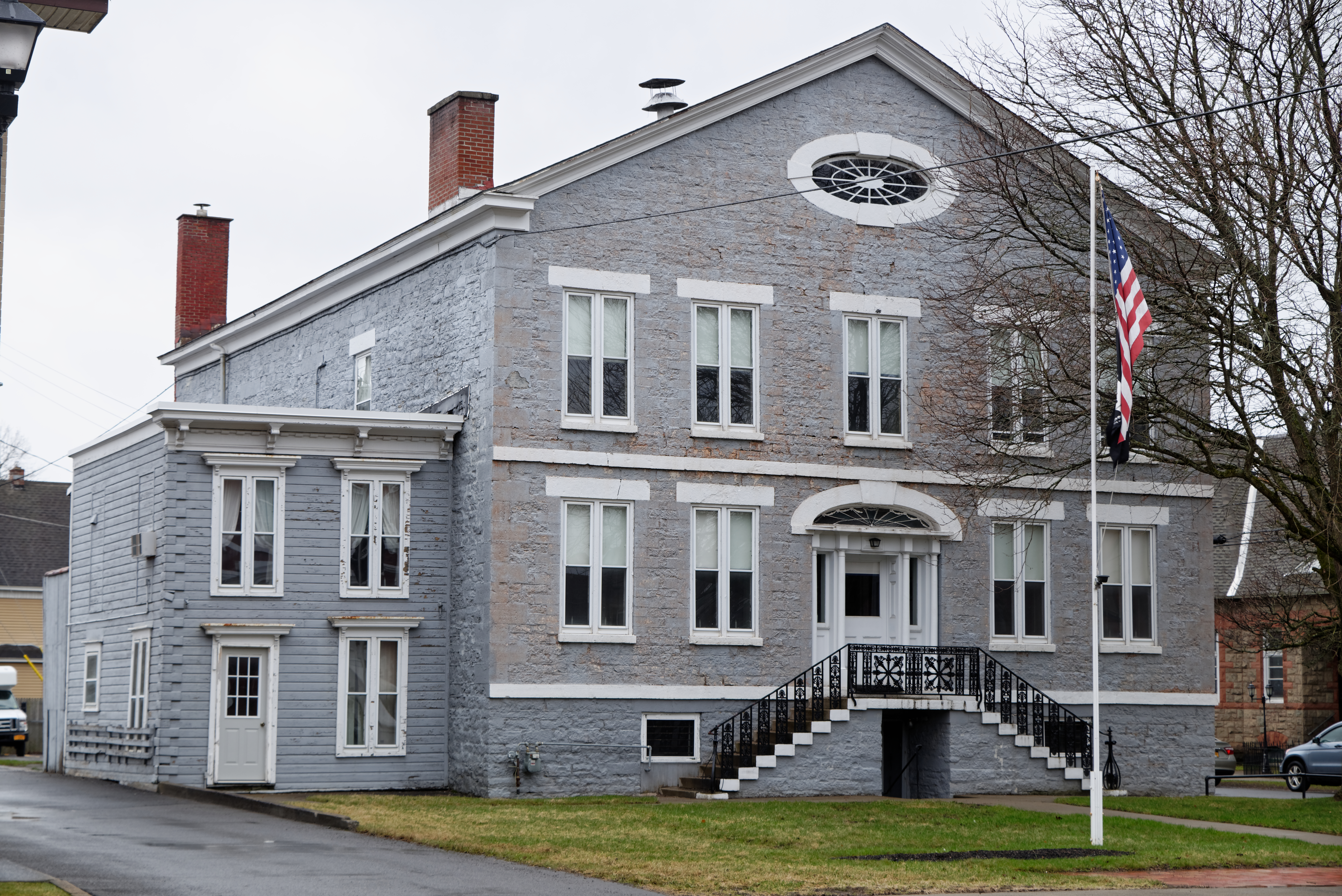

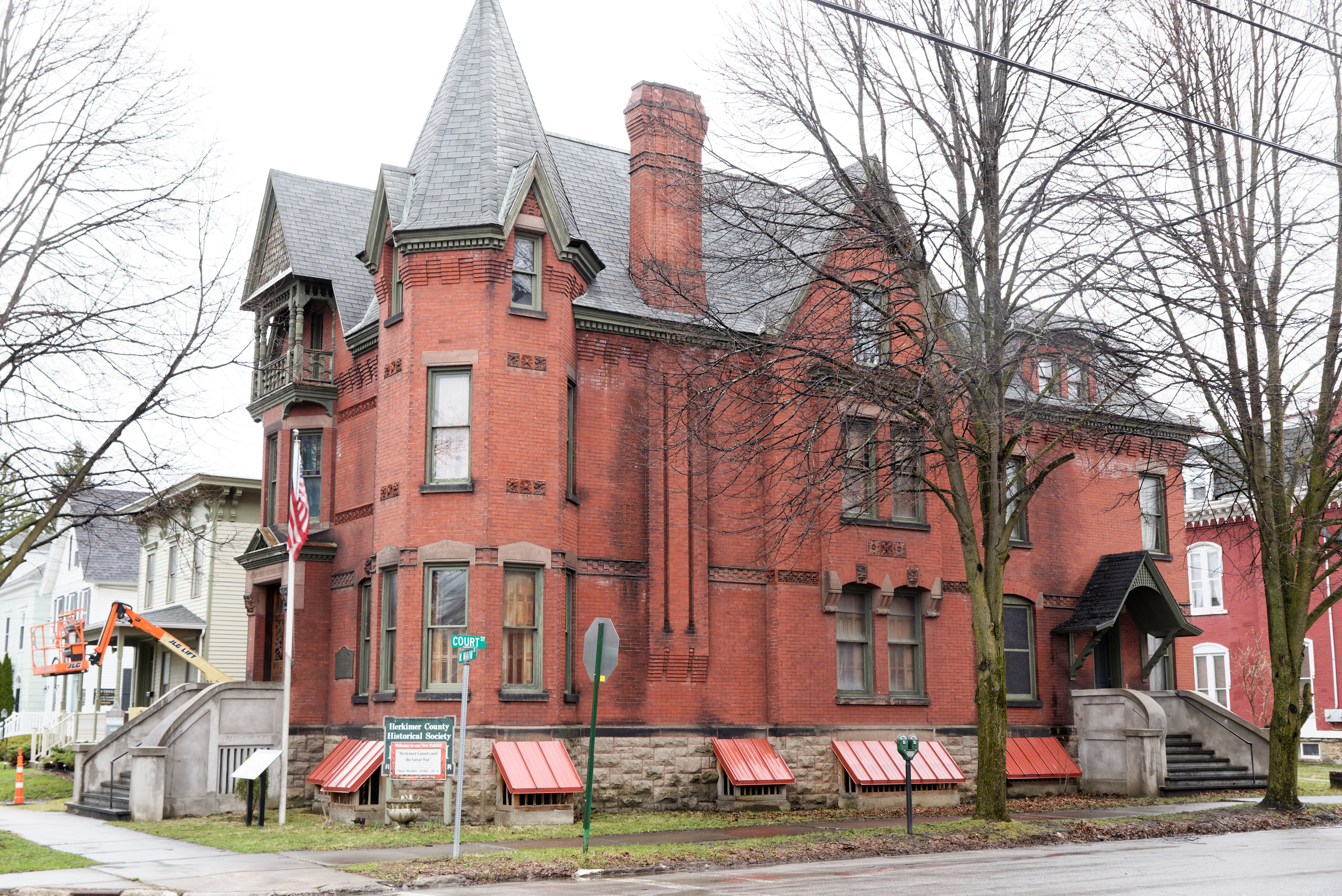
Now houses the county historical society

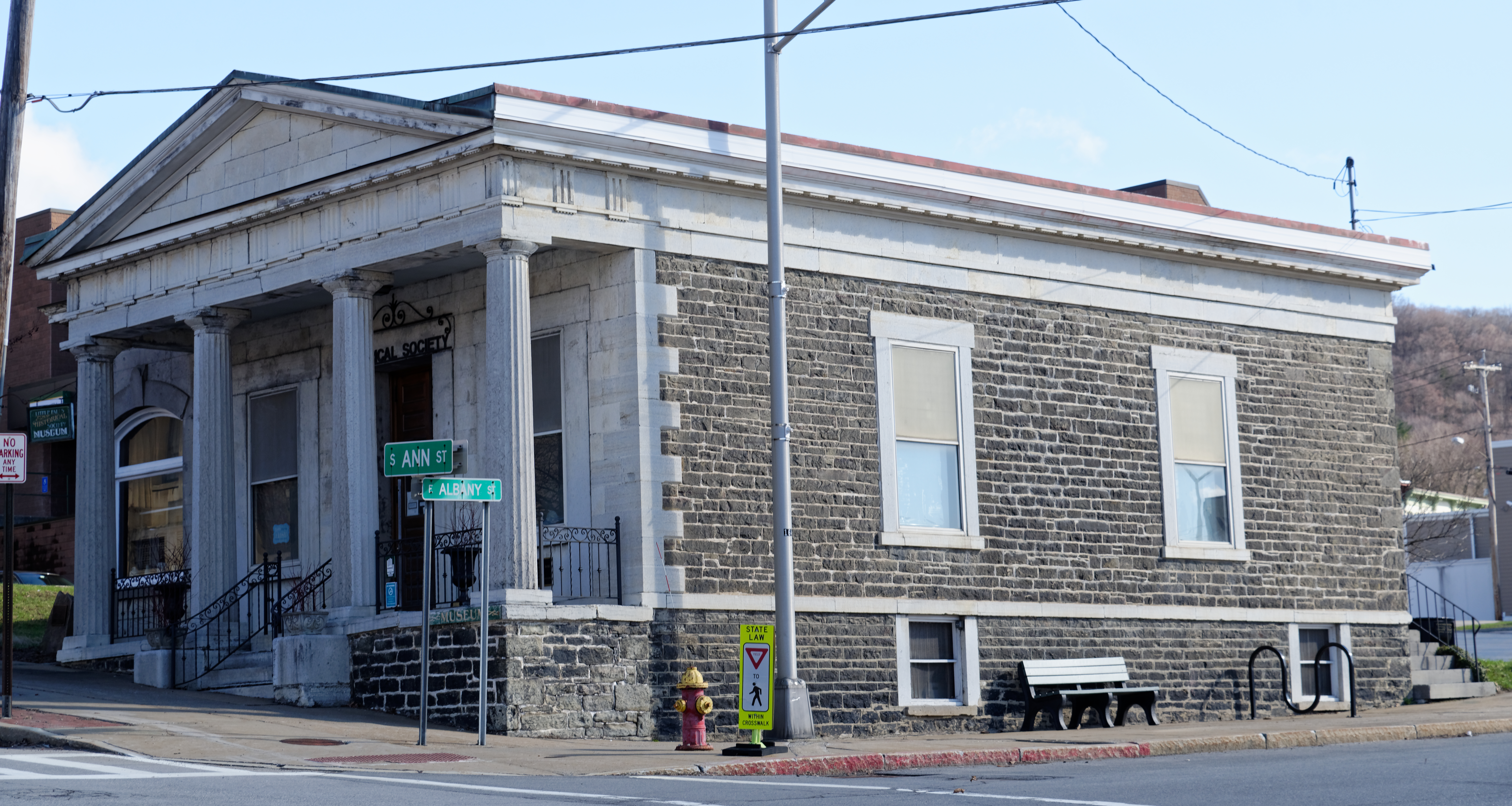
Herkimer County Trust Company (now Historical Society and Museum)
