= Little Falls Gulf Curve crash of 1940 =

Railway incident in New York, United States

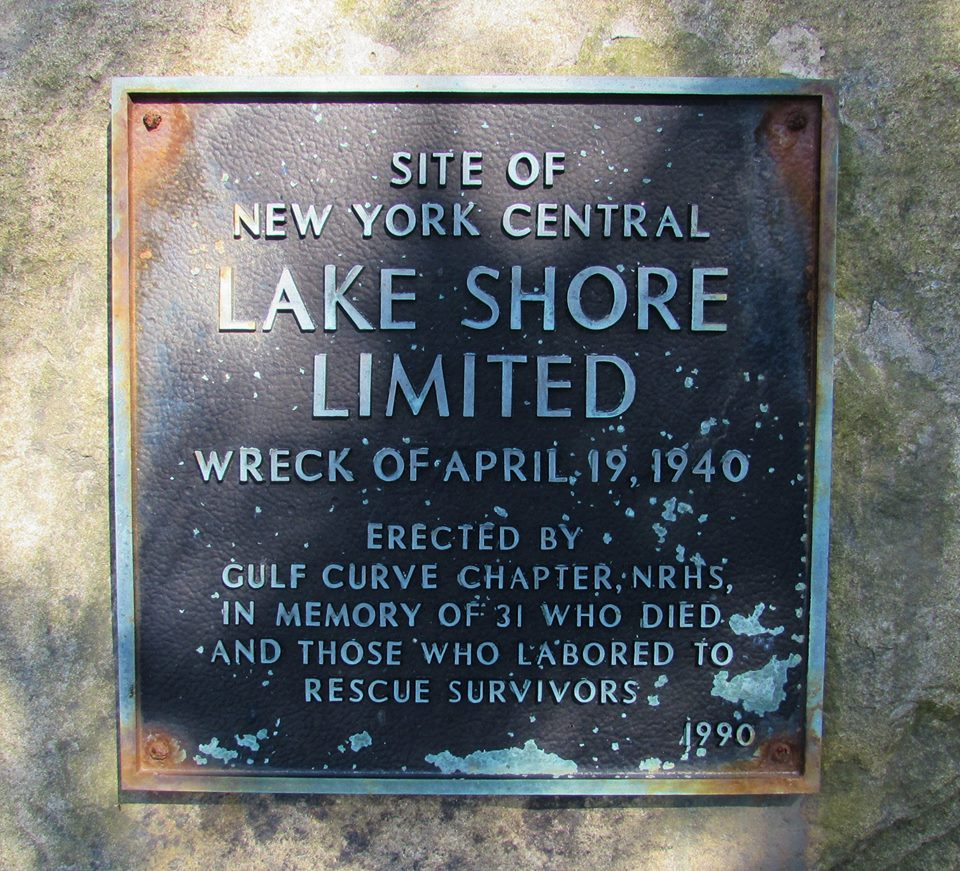
- Commemorative plaque erected near accident site in 1990

Details
- Date: April 19, 1940; 11:33 p.m.
- Location: Little Falls, New York
- Coordinates: 43°02′30″N 74°50′55″W
- Country: United States
- Line: New York Central Railroad
- Incident type: Derailment
- Cause: Excessive speed on sharp curve

Statistics
- Trains: 1
- Passengers: ~250
- Deaths: 31
- Injured: 51

A train crash with fatalities occurred shortly after 11:30 p.m. on April 19, 1940, when a first-class westbound Lake Shore Limited operated by the New York Central Railroad, derailed near Little Falls, New York, United States. The accident was later found to have occurred due to excessive speed on the Gulf Curve, the sharpest on the Central's lines. It killed 31; an additional 51 were injured.

The 15-car train had left Albany 23 minutes behind schedule; the engineer may have been trying to make up time.

== Departure ==
The train departed New York City's Grand Central Terminal at 6:50 p.m. with approximately 250 passengers on board with a scheduled arrival in Chicago at 1:10 p.m. on April 20. It made its first stop in Albany, arriving fourteen minutes late and after switching engines, as the original engine was "not steaming well", was an additional seven minutes behind schedule upon leaving Albany at 10:09 p.m. The train was operated by 65 year old engineer Jesse H. Earl, who had been an engineer since 1906 and was one month from retirement. It was proceeding to a stop in Utica originally scheduled at 11:31 p.m. When it passed Fonda at 11:07 p.m., it was a further two minutes behind schedule. It then passed St. Johnsville at 11:25 p.m. and entered Little Falls, the only incorporated city in Herkimer County. There it derailed in a violent crash at about 11:33 p.m. Engineer Earl initially survived the accident but died from his injuries before he could be extricated from the wreckage.

== Location ==
The accident happened 2,895 feet (882 m) east of the Little Falls train station where the tracks run parallel to the north shore of the Mohawk River, on the Gulf Curve, the sharpest curve in the New York Central system, a 7-degree bend, where the speed limit was 45 miles per hour (72 km/h). A 1903 crash of a newspaper train, consisting of three cars of New York City newspapers bound for upstate cities, occurred on the same curve and killed the engineer and fireman, at which time a speed limit was imposed there.

== Equipment ==
Train consist
April 19, 1940
- Train: #19, Lake Shore Limited
- NYC 5315 Class J-1e (4-6-4) locomotive; (identity unknown) Express car; (identity unknown) Baggage car; Red Ash Pullman sleeping car; Poplar Arch Pullman sleeping car; Elkhart Valley Pullman sleeper-lounge car; Poplar Dome Pullman sleeping car; NYC 560 dining car; Lake Bruin Pullman sleeping car; East Bernard Pullman sleeping car; Poplar Lodge Pullman sleeping car; St. Gothard Pass Pullman sleeping car; East Braintree Pullman sleeping car

The train was pulled by a 316,000-pound (143,000 kg) steam engine number 5315, a NYC Hudson 4-6-4 type in service since 1931. The New York Central Railroad's 4-6-4s themselves began with J-1a 5200, built in 1927. However, 5315 was a member of the J-1e subclass built in 1931 for the railroad. It was also the first in the J-1e subclass to be produced. Until larger locomotives came along in the 1940s, J-1e 5315 along with the rest of the NYC Hudsons were the largest locomotives used for high-speed passenger service on the Central. The remaining cars were, in order, one express car, one baggage car, two coaches, four Pullman sleeping cars (named respectively Red Ash, Poplar Arch, Elkhart Valley, and Poplar Dome, one dining car, five Pullman sleeping cars, and one coach. All fifteen cars were standard heavy weight (all-steel) cars. The train derailed while moving at a speed of 59 miles per hour (95 km/h). It continued diagonally across other tracks approximately 400 feet (120 m) before being stopped by a rock embankment. Eleven of the cars derailed and most sustained major damage. The fourth car came to rest on its side on East Main Street which ran parallel to the tracks. The remaining four cars remained on the track and had minor damage. The two train-service employees killed were the engineer and the fireman, J.Y. Smith. All of the four parallel tracks were blocked by the wreckage. The engine's boiler exploded upon striking the rock wall, sending fragments up to a quarter-mile (400 m) away.

== Cause ==
The train was traveling 74 miles (119 km) per hour before it began to slow down at the curve. A surviving employee in the engine warned the engineer that the train was traveling too fast, but the engineer closed the throttle suddenly instead of applying more braking and the train derailed. The conductor reported that the air brakes were tested at Albany and were working properly. The brakes successfully slowed the train at prior points of required speed reductions. An investigation into the derailment was undertaken by officials of the railroad, inspectors of the Interstate Commerce Commission and the New York State Public Service Commission. In addition to excessive speed, the sudden closing of the throttle contributed to the crash due to effects of momentum of water in the tender, and of the sudden compression of the slack between the cars, both factors causing the engine and tender to jackknife. There was initial speculation that the roadbed may have been weakened by heavy spring rains but this was not cited in the final report. The track itself was in very good condition, having been laid the prior summer.

== Rescue ==
Rescuers responded from Little Falls, Herkimer, Utica, Ilion and other nearby towns. Bonfires were set for illumination and acetylene torches were used to free victims. Rescue operations were made more difficult by rain, sleet and snow that began in the early morning hours of April 20. Injured victims were sent to hospitals in Little Falls, Frankfort, Herkimer, Utica, and Ilion as well as to hotels, private homes and churches. The New York State Police estimated that 4,000 people converged at the scene. Wreckage blocked direct vehicular access to the crash site, requiring rescuers to take a three-mile (4.8 km) detour between the site and the hospital a half-mile (800 m) away. At the state capitol, Governor Herbert H. Lehman directed the State Police and Public Works employees to "give all possible aid". The last body was pulled from the wreckage on April 21. Thirty-five Chinese nationals en route to San Francisco in the custody of a United States Marshal, who were being deported for entering the US illegally, were in the last car and were uninjured. (Another source says they were being transported to Canada, from where they entered the US.)

Dozens of other trains were delayed in the days following the wreck; the site was bypassed by routing trains, including the 20th Century Limited, the Commodore Vanderbilt, and the Water Level Limited between Utica and Schenectady over West Shore Railroad tracks.

== Casualties and reporting ==
- Killed: 26 passengers, 2 Pullman porters, 1 train porter, 2 train-service employees
- Injured: 47 passengers, 1 Pullman porter, 2 dining-car employees, 1 other employee

The wreck was page-one news for newspapers across the country. The New York Times gave the story a two-column headline on page one on April 20, and on Sunday, April 21 it was still on the first page with a huge panoramic photograph of the wreck site. Photographs of the crash were published in the 2010 book Images of America Little Falls.

== Realignment ==
The crash caused John Crowley, publisher of the local newspaper the Little Falls Evening Times to advocate through the paper's editorials for the elimination of the sharp curve, where two people died decades earlier in the 1903 crash of a newspaper train. Prior attempts were not implemented due to cost. A realignment to reduce the angle of the curve was completed on November 19, 1947, which required diverting the river farther south and filling in the old channel. The fourteen month construction project reduced the bend from 7° 24′ to 1° 30′ and allows trains to continue through the bend at normal speed. 6,300 feet (1,900 m) of roadbed were reconstructed on an embankment averaging 65 feet (20 m) in height separating the roadbed from the river. Creating a 20 feet (6.1 m) deep, 150 feet (46 m) wide new channel for the river required blasting and excavation of 138,000 cubic yards (106,000 m^{3}) of rock and was the largest part of the project. The project cost $2.5 million. According to the railroad, the improvement was planned immediately after the accident but due to shortages of material and manpower caused by World War II, the project was postponed until the end of the war.

== Safety record ==
Prior to this crash, the New York Central had gone 13 years without a passenger fatality. The year before, it had received the Harriman Award, an annual award presented to American railroad companies in recognition of outstanding safety achievements. There was speculation that engineer Earl, a senior engineer with an excellent record, exceeded the speed limit on the curve because of the competitive pressure the passenger railroads were receiving from the airlines. He may also have been worried about being put further behind schedule once reaching Utica because one of the Pullman cars, with passengers destined for the northern New York towns of Saranac Lake and Lake Placid, would have to be switched out of the train there to join a different northbound Adirondack Division train.

== Historical marker ==
A memorial marker was erected by the Gulf Curve Chapter of the National Railway Historical Society in 1990 at the junction of River Road and Route 5 mounted to a boulder (43° 2.563' N, 74° 50.943' W).

== See also ==
- 1940 in the United States
- List of American railroad accidents
- List of rail accidents (1930–49)
