= Michelle Gavin =

American diplomat and foreign policy scholar

Michelle D. Gavin
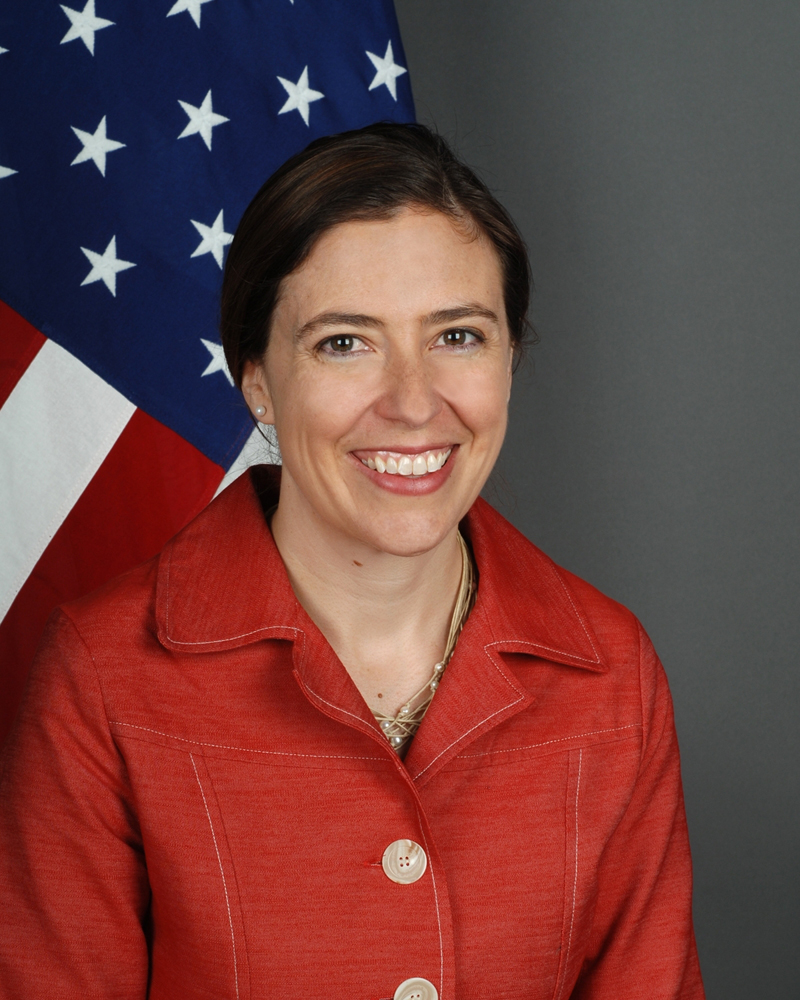

United States Ambassador to Botswana
- In office June 20, 2011 – February 22, 2014
- President: Barack Obama
- Preceded by: Stephen J. Nolan
- Succeeded by: Earl Robert Miller

Personal details
- Born: 1973 (age 52–53)
- Education: Georgetown University (BA); Lincoln College, Oxford (MPhil)

Michelle D. Gavin (born 1973) is an American diplomat and foreign policy scholar who is the Ralph Bunche Senior Fellow for Africa Policy Studies at the Council on Foreign Relations (CFR). She served as the United States ambassador to Botswana from 2011 to 2014 and concurrently as the United States representative to the Southern African Development Community (SADC).

== Early life and education ==
Gavin attended Georgetown University's Walsh School of Foreign Service, where she earned a Bachelor of Arts and was a Truman Scholar. She subsequently attended Lincoln College, Oxford as a Rhodes Scholar, earning a Master of Philosophy in international relations.

While an undergraduate at Georgetown, Gavin studied abroad in Cameroon in 1994. She has cited the experience, which coincided with major political developments elsewhere in Africa including the Rwandan genocide and South Africa's first post-apartheid general election, as influential in developing her interest in African politics.

== Career ==
=== United States Senate ===
Gavin began working on African affairs in the United States Senate while an undergraduate, working for Senator Nancy Kassebaum, who chaired the Senate Foreign Relations Subcommittee on African Affairs.

She later spent six years as a foreign policy adviser to Senator Russ Feingold. She served as director of international policy issues for Feingold and as staff director of the Senate Foreign Relations Committee's Subcommittee on African Affairs. She subsequently served as legislative director for Senator Ken Salazar.

Before joining the Obama administration, Gavin was an International Affairs Fellow and adjunct fellow for Africa at the Council on Foreign Relations, where her work focused on democracy and governance.

=== Obama administration ===
From 2009 to 2011, Gavin served as special assistant to President Barack Obama and senior director for Africa on the National Security Council. In that role, she helped develop the Young African Leaders Initiative and led policy reviews concerning Sudan and Somalia.

Obama announced his intention to nominate Gavin as United States ambassador to Botswana on February 16, 2011. She was appointed on April 18, 2011, and presented her credentials to the government of Botswana on June 20, 2011.

==== Ambassador to Botswana ====
Gavin served as United States ambassador to Botswana from 2011 until February 2014 and concurrently represented the United States to the Southern African Development Community.

=== Post-government career ===
In 2015, Gavin became managing director of The Africa Center, a multidisciplinary institution in New York City focused on contemporary Africa, serving until 2016.

Gavin subsequently returned to the Council on Foreign Relations, where she became the Ralph Bunche Senior Fellow for Africa Policy Studies. Her research has focused on African politics, governance, security, and United States policy toward Africa.

Gavin has continued to provide testimony and analysis on United States policy toward Africa. In May 2025, she testified before the Senate Foreign Relations Committee at a hearing on political and security developments in East Africa and the Horn of Africa.

== Writing and scholarship ==
Gavin has written on African politics, governance, security, demographic change, and United States policy toward the continent. In 2025, Gavin published The Age of Change: How Urban Youth Are Transforming African Politics, a book examining the political effects of Africa's growing young and urban populations and the role of technological and social change in African political movements.
