= Overlook (Little Falls, New York) =

Historic house in New York, United States

- U.S. National Register of Historic Places
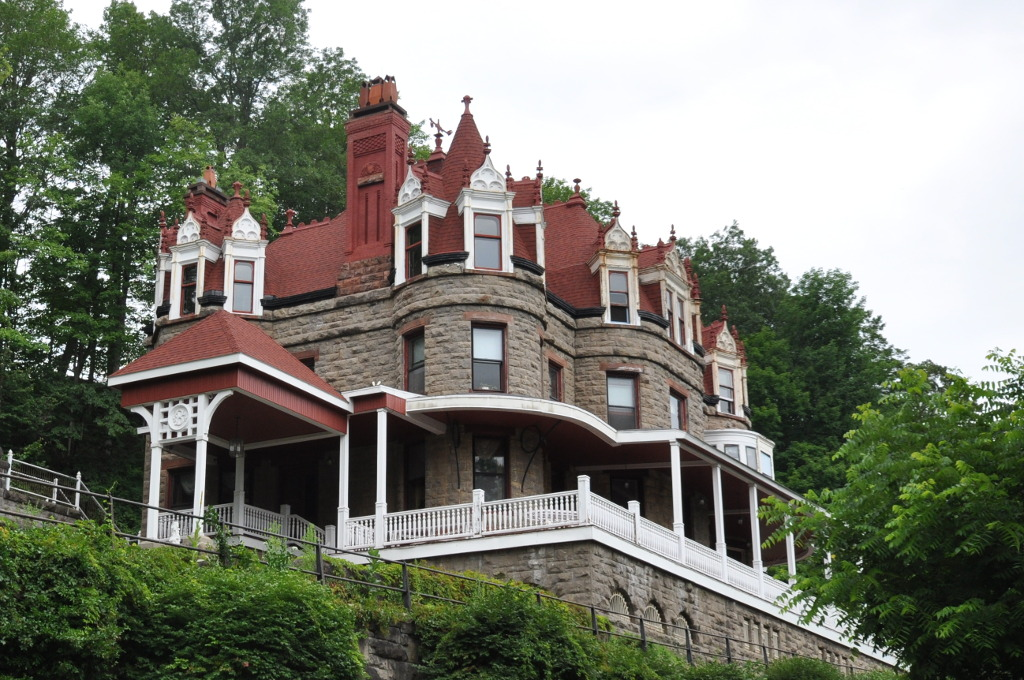

- Location within New York Location within the United States
- Interactive map showing the location of Overlook
- Nearest city: Little Falls, New York
- Coordinates: 43°3′0″N 74°51′32″W
- Area: 8.8 acres (3.6 ha)
- Built: 1889
- Architect: Russell, Archimedes
- Architectural style: High Victorian, Queen Anne, Richardsonian Romanesque
- NRHP reference No.: 10000484
- Added to NRHP: July 19, 2010

Overlook, also known as the Burrell Mansion, is a historic home located at Little Falls in Herkimer County, New York. It was designed by architect Archimedes Russell (1840 - 1915) and built around 1889 for industrialist and inventor David H. Burrell (1841-1919). It is a three-story, asymmetrical masonry building. It features three full height towers, two rounded with conical roofs and one polygonal. Also on the property is a contributing carriage house and caretaker's cottage. It currently serves as a short-term rental residence.

It was listed on the National Register of Historic Places in 2009.
