= Little Falls City Hall =

- U.S. National Register of Historic Places
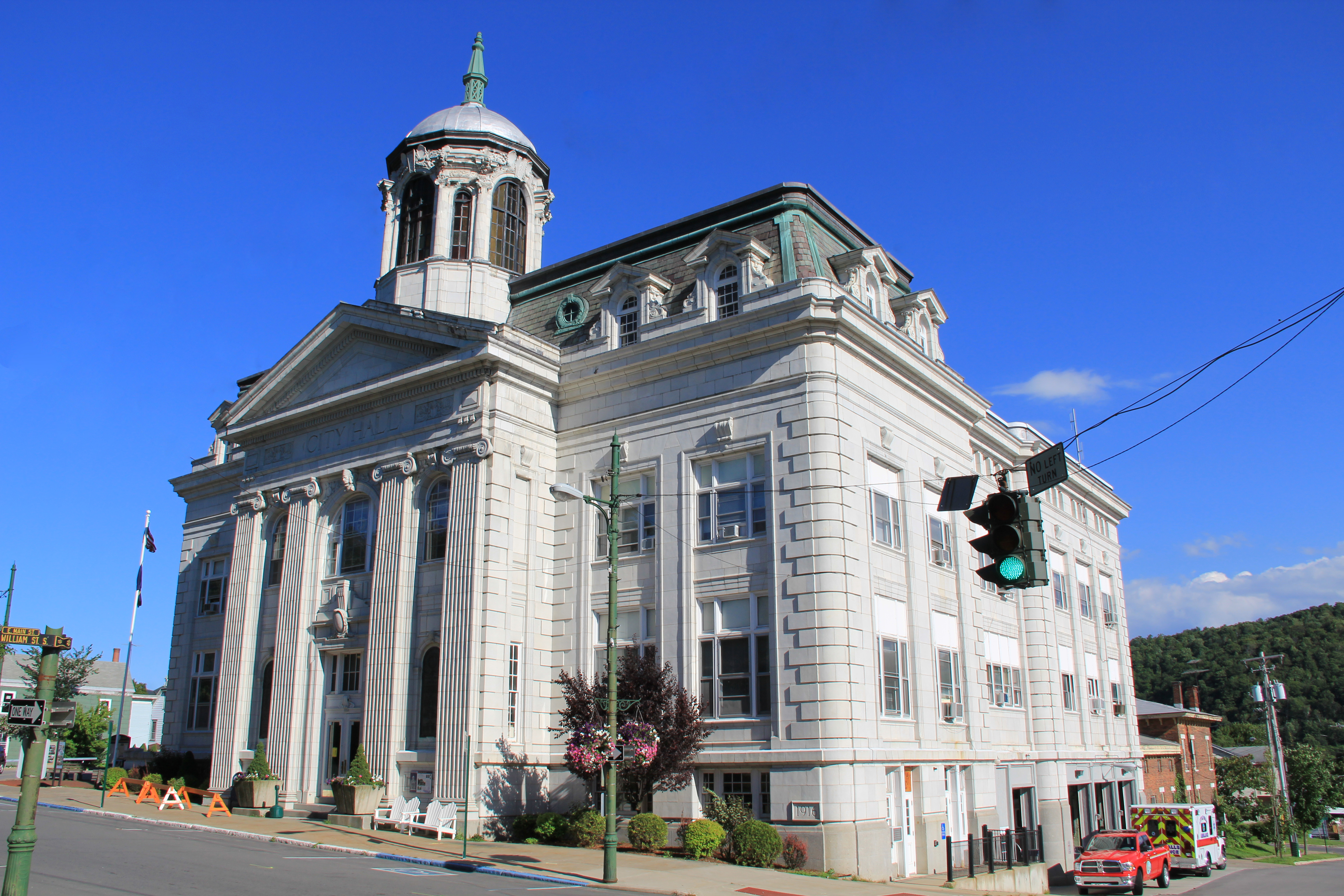
- Little Falls City Hall, August 2013

- Location within New York Location within the United States
- Map showing the location of Little Falls City Hall
- Nearest city: 659 E. Main St., Little Falls, New York
- Coordinates: 43°02′40″N 74°51′20″W
- Area: Less than one acre
- Built: 1916-1918
- Built by: George B. Willis & Company; Hallinan & Snyder
- Architects: William Neil Smith; Carl Haug & Sons
- Architectural style: Classical Revival
- NRHP reference No.: 11000596
- Added to NRHP: August 24, 2011

Little Falls City Hall is a historic city hall located at Little Falls in Herkimer County, New York. It was built between 1916 and 1918, and is a 2 1/2-story, steel frame building faced in brick and terra cotta in the Classical Revival style. It has a slate covered mansard roof with decorative copper and dormers and sits on a concrete foundation. Atop the roof is a large lantern structure with a tiled dome roof, arched windows paneled with colored art glass, and sculptural work featuring Native American figureheads, cornucopia with pine cones, and acanthus leaf detailing. The main section of the building is seven bays wide and two bays deep. The front facade features a monumental, three-bay, projecting center entrance pavilion with four fluted pilasters.

It was designed by William Neil Smith of New York City, who designed many buildings in upstate New York, including the local masonic temple in 1914. Carl Haug & Sons, local architects, were originally hired to design the building, but were reduced to supervising architects for Smith. The builders were Hallinan & Snyder of Little Falls and G. B. Willis & Company of New York.

It was listed on the National Register of Historic Places in 2011.

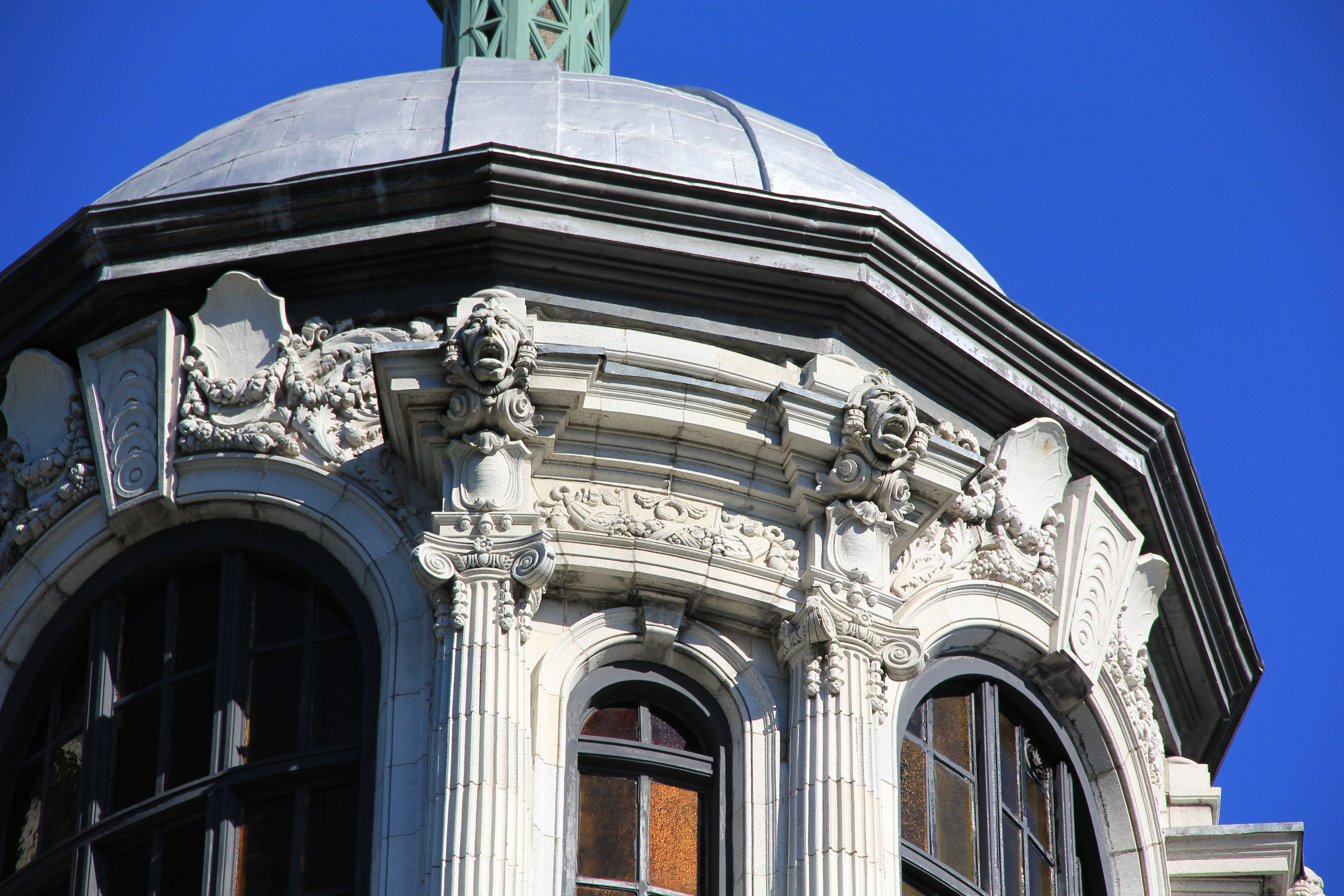
Lantern sculptural details

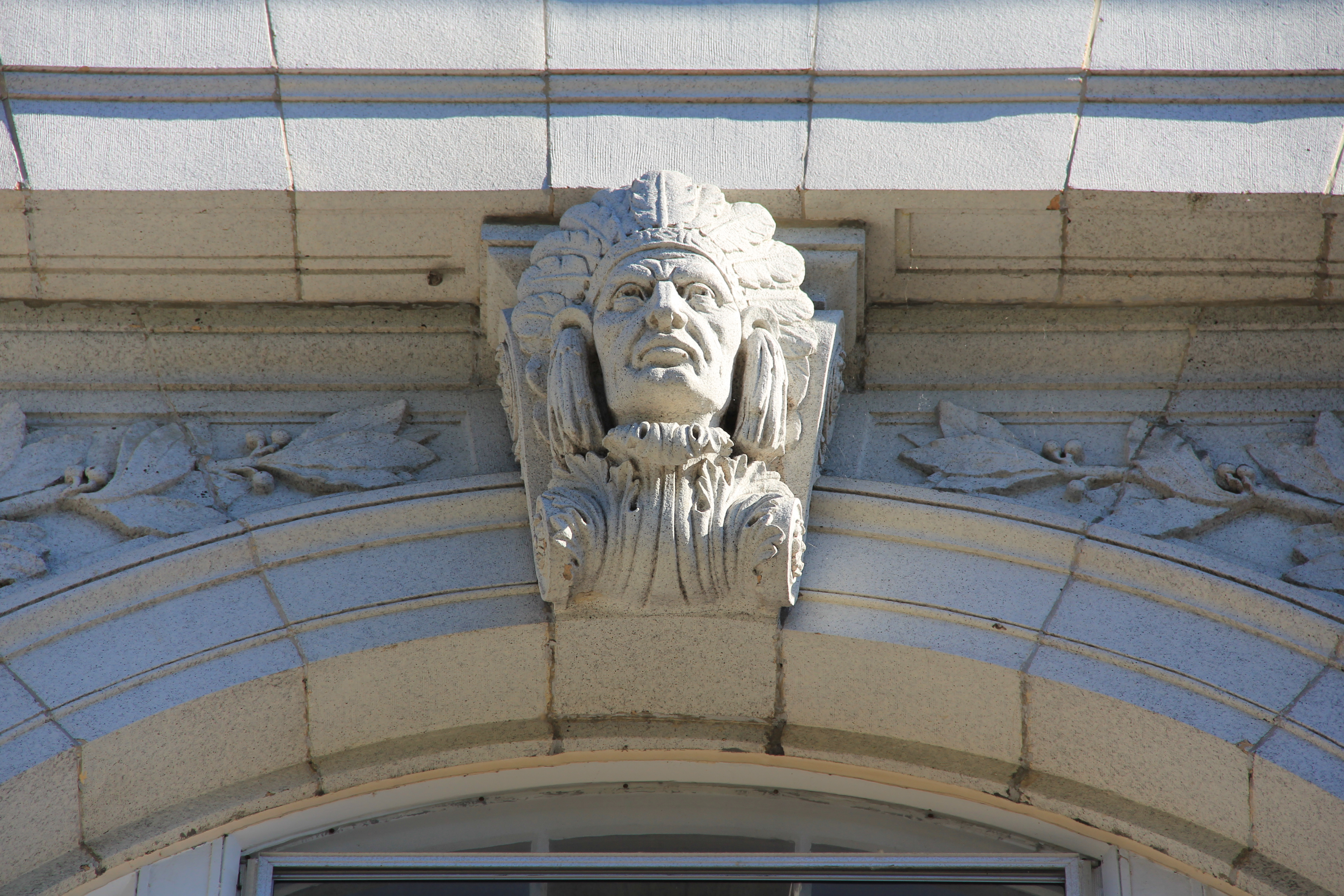
Keystone detail

Classical Revival Native American sculptural detail
