= United States Post Office (Little Falls, New York) =

Historic US post office

- US Post Office-Little Falls
- U.S. National Register of Historic Places
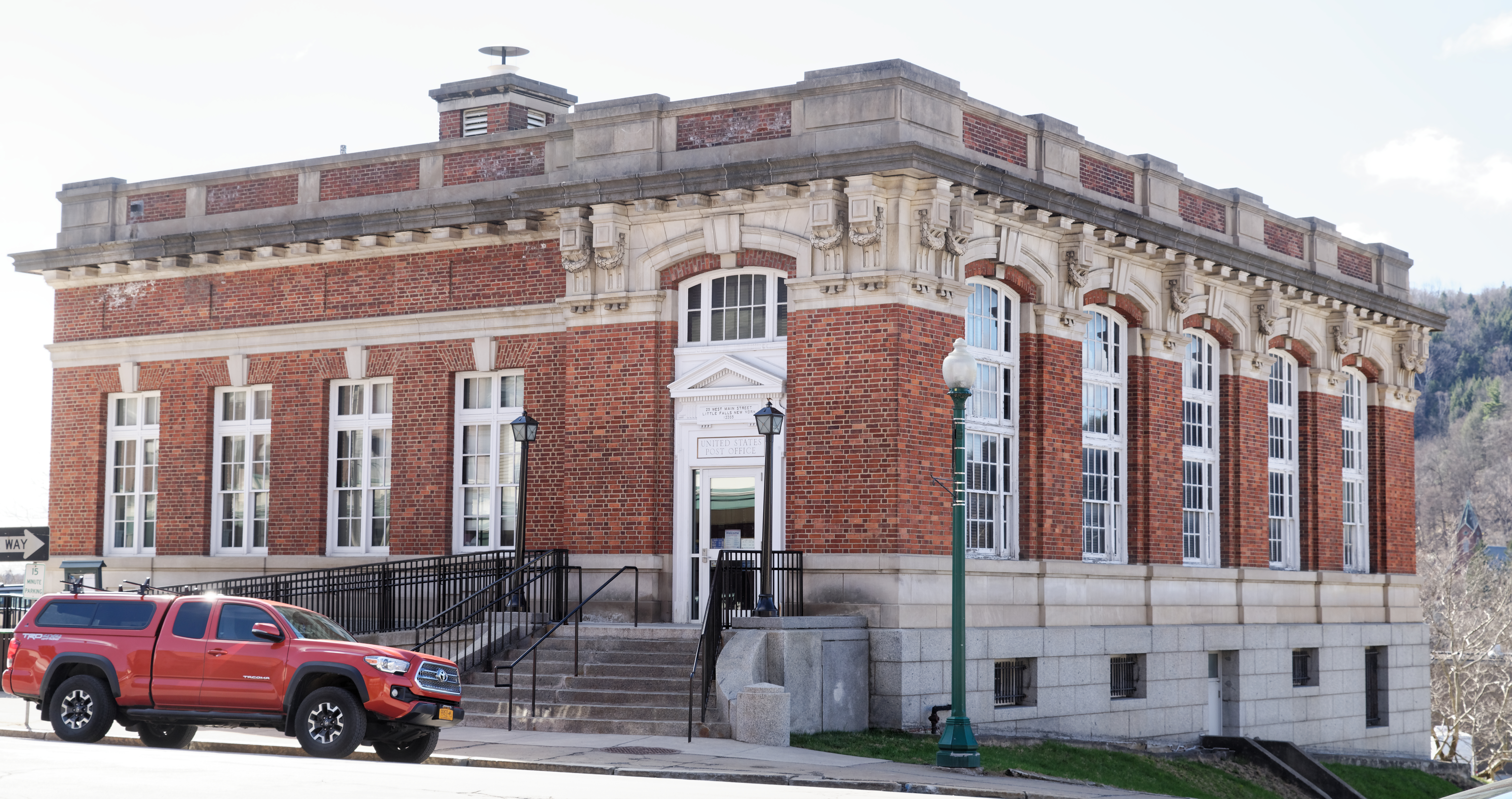

- Location within New York Location within the United States
- Interactive map showing the location for U.S. Post Office-Little Falls
- Location: 25 W. Main St., Little Falls, New York
- Coordinates: 43°2′34″N 74°51′38″W
- Area: less than one acre
- Built: 1907
- Architect: Taylor, James Knox; US Treasury Department
- Architectural style: Beaux Arts
- MPS: US Post Offices in New York State, 1858-1943, TR
- NRHP reference No.: 88002343
- Added to NRHP: May 11, 1989

US Post Office-Little Falls is a historic post office building located at Little Falls in Herkimer County, New York, United States. It was built in 1907-1909 (with an addition in 1938-1940), and is one of a number of post offices in New York State designed by the Office of the Supervising Architect of the Treasury Department, James Knox Taylor. It is a brick and granite structure, five bays wide, in the Beaux Arts style with a highly ornamented facade.

It was listed on the National Register of Historic Places in 1989.
