= Herkimer County Trust Company Building =

Historic commercial building in New York, United States

- U.S. National Register of Historic Places
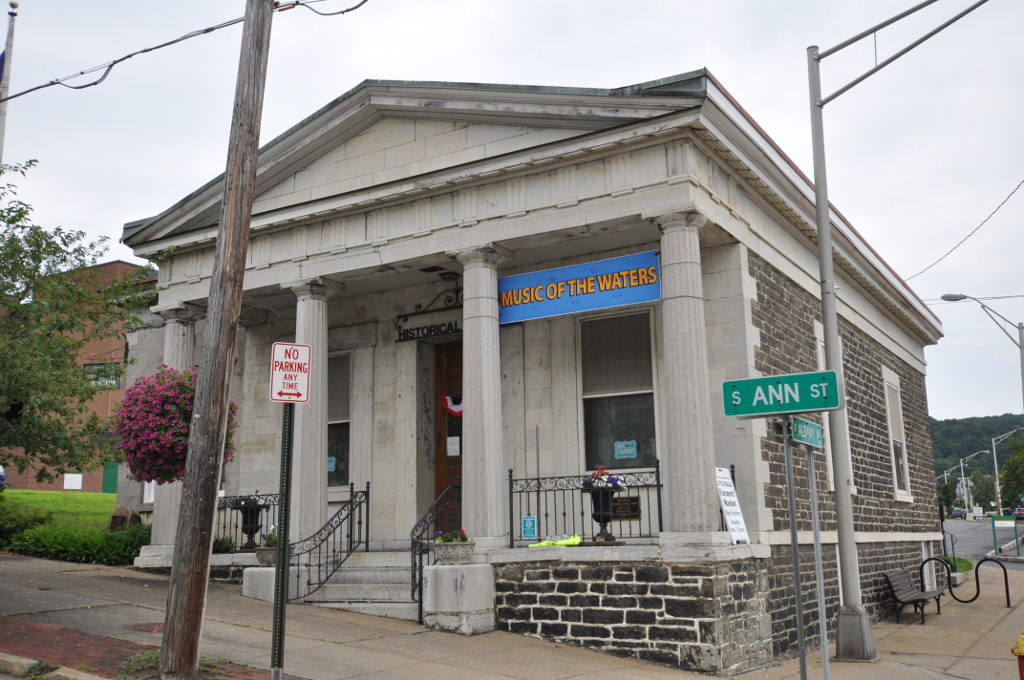

- Location within New York Location within the United States
- Location: Corner of Ann and Albany Sts., Little Falls, New York
- Coordinates: 43°2′34″N 74°51′33″W
- Area: 0 acres (0 ha)
- Built: 1833
- Architect: Chase, David; Stewart, Robert
- Architectural style: Greek Revival
- NRHP reference No.: 70000421
- Added to NRHP: March 5, 1970

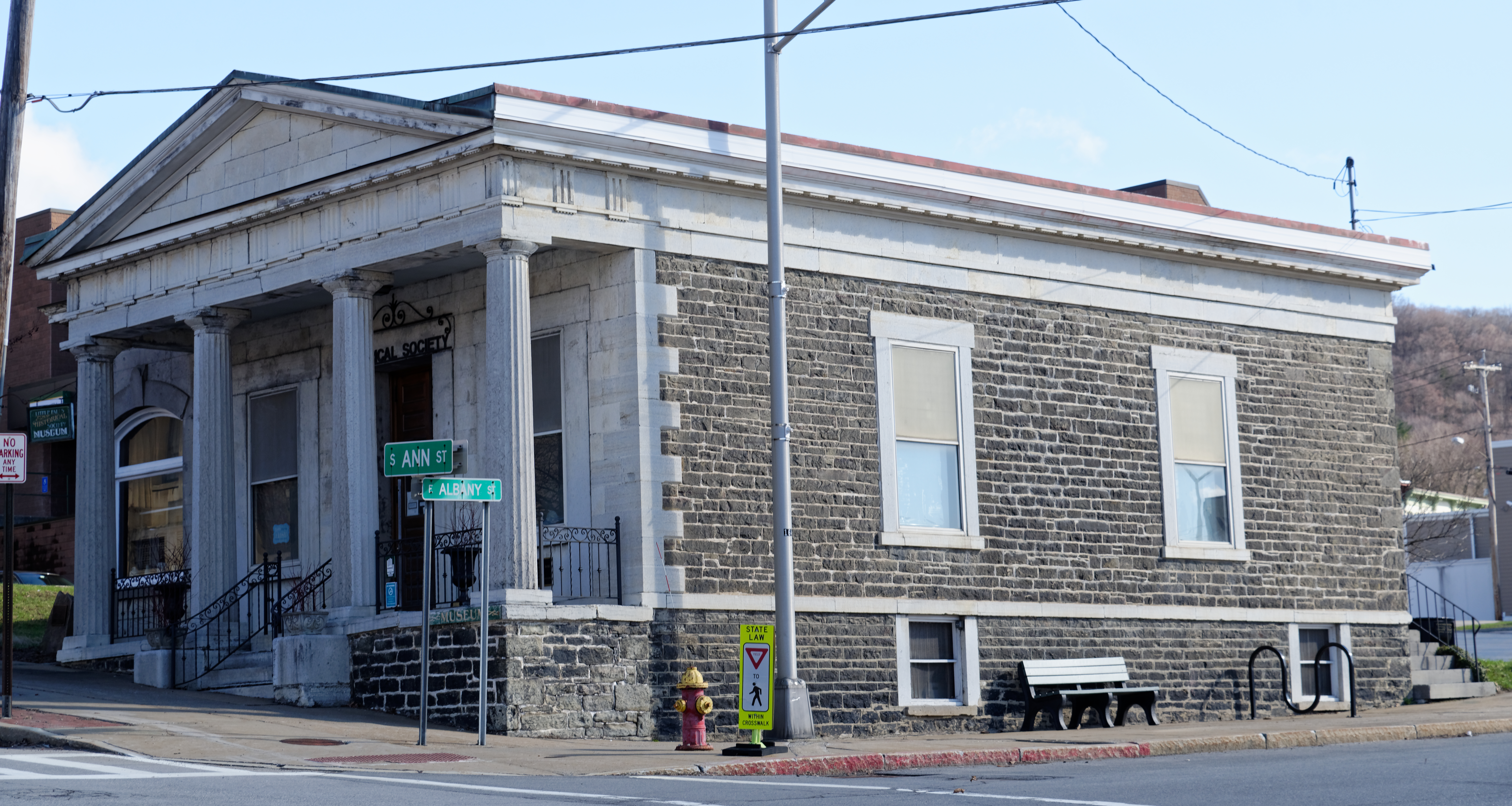
Angle view

Herkimer County Trust Company Building is a historic bank building located at Little Falls, New York in Herkimer County, New York. It was built in 1833 and is a three-by-two-bay rectangular structure built of cut stone and broken range masonry. It features a portico supported by four Ionic order stone columns and gable roof in the Greek Revival style. It housed the Herkimer County Bank/Herkimer County Trust Company until 1917, and now houses the local historical society.

It was listed on the National Register of Historic Places in 1970.
