= Emmanuel Episcopal Church (Little Falls, New York) =

Historic church in New York, United States

- U.S. National Register of Historic Places
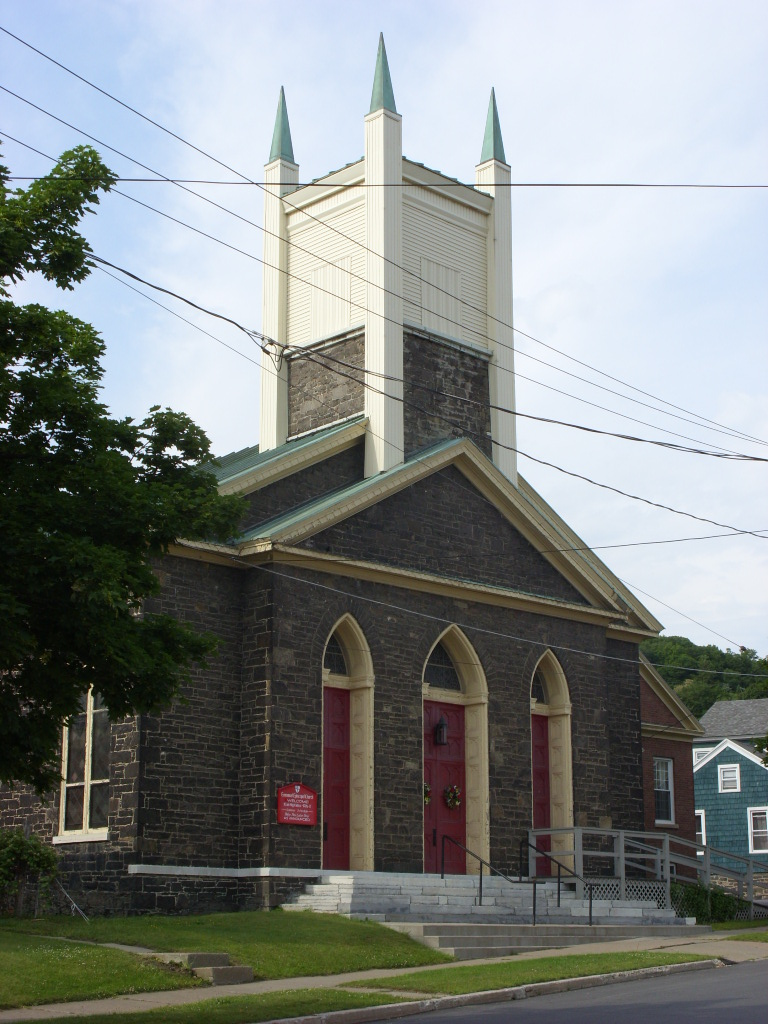
- Emmanuel Episcopal Church, June 2009

- Location within New York Location within the United States
- Nearest city: 588 Albany St., Little Falls, New York
- Coordinates: 43°2′39.23″N 74°51′19.41″W
- Built: 1835
- Architectural style: Italianate
- NRHP reference No.: 09000574
- Added to NRHP: July 29, 2009

Emmanuel Episcopal Church is a historic Episcopal church complex located at Little Falls in Herkimer County, New York, USA. The complex consists of the original 1835 church building, an 1853 Italianate style parsonage, and a parish hall built about 1937. The church is a simple rectangular building in the meetinghouse style with a bell tower. It is two stories and built of limestone.

The church was listed on the National Register of Historic Places in 2009. It was built in a period of growth of the Episcopal Church in upstate New York, where the population had expanded rapidly after the American Revolutionary War, attracting many migrants from New England. The Episcopal Church of the United States of America became independent of the Anglican Church after the war.

European-American Little Falls was originally settled by German Palatine migrants and their descendants. Later settlers were of Dutch, English, and Scots-Irish descent, and often belonged to Protestant reform and Congregational traditions. The oldest families from the colonial era often also had Mohawk people ancestry, as this people historically occupied much of the Mohawk Valley and traded with new immigrants. A quarter century after the war, the American Episcopal church, had attracted more members, and its congregations built numerous churches in upstate towns.
