= David H. Burrell =

American businessman and inventor

David Hamlin Burrell (1841 – January 13, 1919) was an American industrialist, inventor, and philanthropist based in Little Falls, New York. He achieved prominence through improvements and inventions related to the dairy industry during the late 19th and early 20th centuries.

He developed most of his inventions at his Overlook estate at Little Falls. There he invented a seamless cheese bandage, silos for the preservation of ensilage, the Burrell-Simplex Link Blade "Simplex" Separator, milk pasteurization systems, churns, butter workers, milk testers and coolers, gang presses, and a universally accepted, patented, BLK milking machine. He also patented the first practical oil burner in 1885. President Ronald Reagan officially proclaimed 1985 to be "Oil Heat Centennial Year" to posthumously honor Burrell.

He was a Republican and served as Presidential Elector for New York, in the Presidential Election of 1896.

He died at his home in Little Falls on January 13, 1919.
