= South Ann Street–Mill Street Historic District =

Historic district in New York, United States

- U.S. National Register of Historic Places
- U.S. Historic district
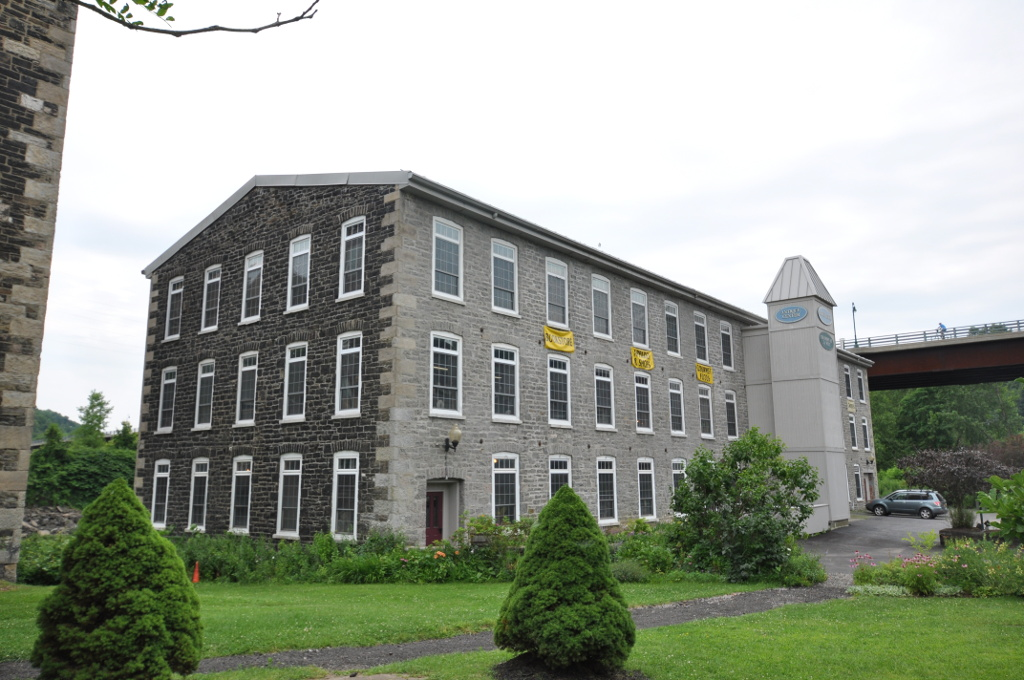

- Location within New York Location within the United States
- Interactive map showing the location for South Ann Street-Mill Street Historic District
- Location: S. Ann & Mill Sts., Little Falls, New York
- Coordinates: 43°2′27.92″N 74°51′31.69″W
- Area: 5 acres (2.0 ha)
- NRHP reference No.: 08000139
- Added to NRHP: March 6, 2008

South Ann Street–Mill Street Historic District is a national historic district located at Little Falls in Herkimer County, New York. The district includes 15 contributing buildings and one contributing structure. They relate to the history of transportation and commercial/industrial development of the city. They include multi-story brick and stone commercial buildings, the former New York Central Railroad passenger station, remains of Erie Canal trunk and aqueduct, and a former hydroelectric power station and remains of the related dam.

It was listed on the National Register of Historic Places in 2008.
