= Craig L. Cloud =

American diplomat

Craig Cloud
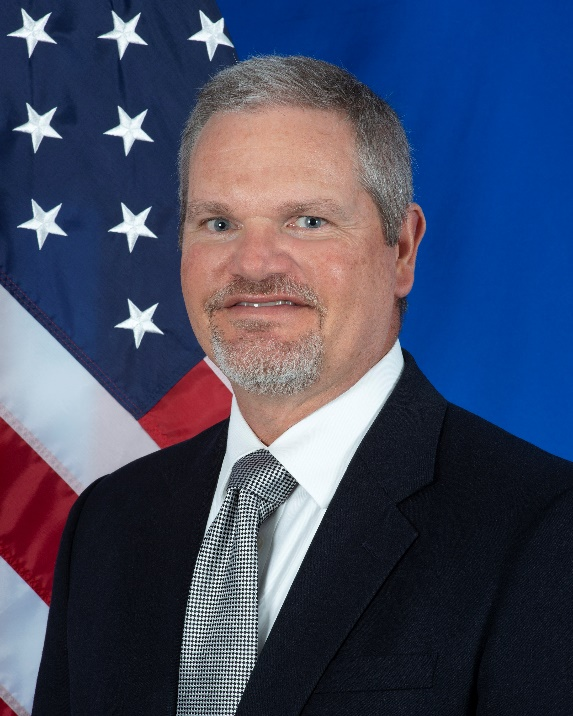

United States Ambassador to Botswana
- In office April 2, 2019 – May 24, 2022
- President: Donald Trump; Joe Biden
- Preceded by: Earl Robert Miller
- Succeeded by: Howard Van Vranken

Personal details
- Spouse: Angie Cloud
- Children: 2
- Education: North Carolina State University (BS)

Craig Lewis Cloud is a U.S. diplomat who served as the United States Ambassador to Botswana.

== Education ==
Cloud received a Bachelor of Science degree in electrical engineering from North Carolina State University in 1986.

== Career ==
Cloud is a career member of the Senior Foreign Service. He has been working for the State Department since 1992. He has served in multiple capacities including as the management counselor of the United States Embassy in Kabul, Afghanistan and minister counselor for management affairs at the United States Embassy in New Delhi, India. He has also worked in U.S. embassies in Congo, Swaziland and Zimbabwe.

=== United States ambassador to Botswana ===
On August 13, 2018, President Trump nominated Cloud to be the next United States Ambassador to Botswana. On January 2, 2019, the Senate confirmed his nomination by voice vote. He presented his credentials to the Botswana government on April 2, 2019.

As U.S. Ambassador to Botswana, he also served as the U.S. representative to the Southern African Development Community.

He concluded his service as U.S. Ambassador to Botswana on May 24, 2022.

== Personal life ==
Cloud is married to Angie Cloud and has two children. He speaks French and basic Spanish.

== See also ==
- List of ambassadors of the United States
- List of ambassadors appointed by Donald Trump

Diplomatic posts
Preceded by Earl Robert Miller	United States Ambassador to Botswana; 2019–2022	Succeeded by Howard Van Vranken
