= Italian Community Bake Oven =

- U.S. National Register of Historic Places
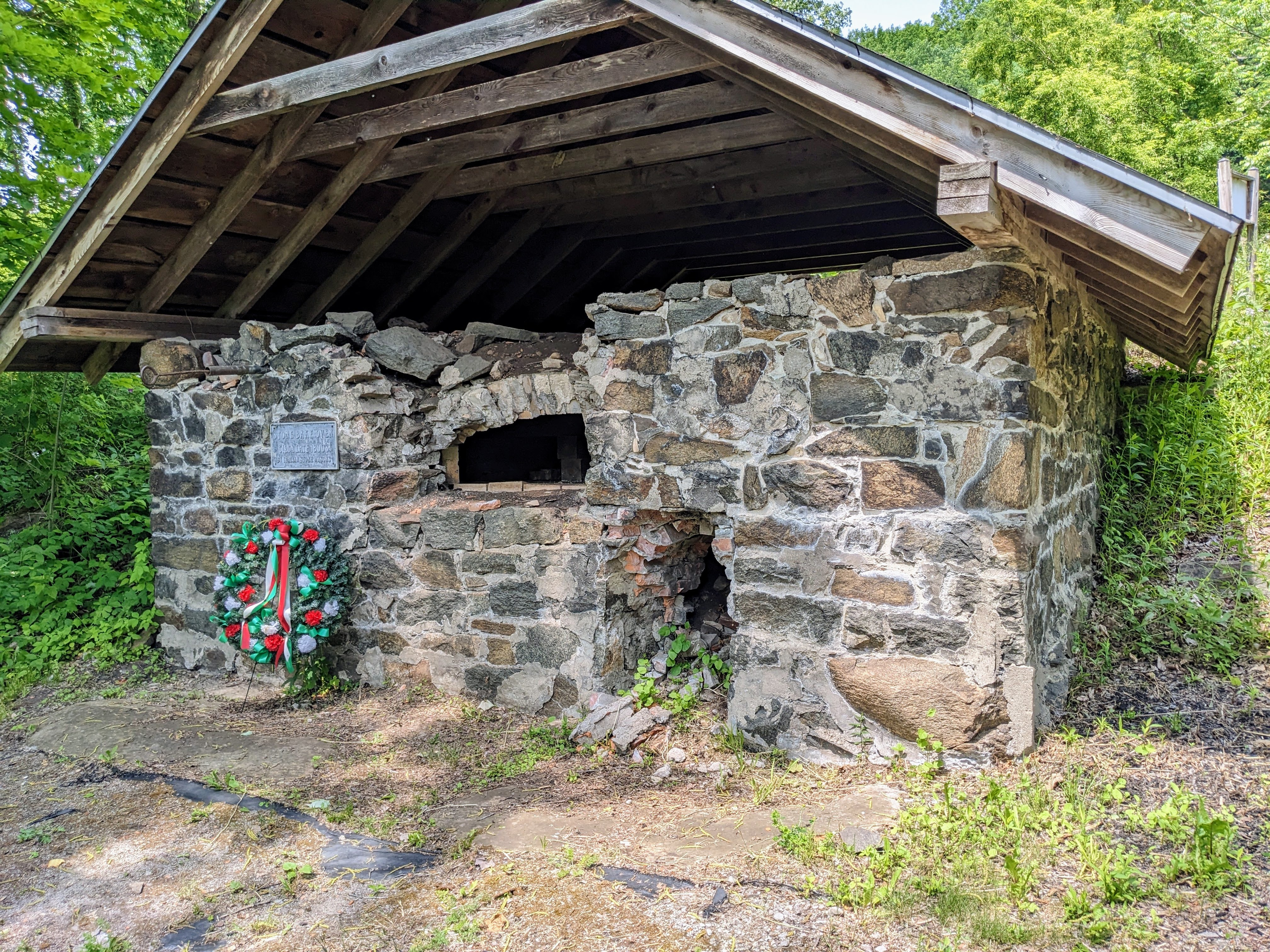

- Location within New York Location within the United States
- Location: NY 167, Little Falls, New York
- Coordinates: 43°2′21″N 74°50′2″W
- Area: less than one acre
- Built: 1891
- NRHP reference No.: 06001003
- Added to NRHP: November 8, 2006

Italian Community Bake Oven is a historic community bake oven located at Little Falls in Herkimer County, New York. It was built about 1891 and is abandoned. The utilitarian structure consists of a large rectangle of stone masonry outer walls enclosing the brick bake oven. The dimensions are approximately 16 feet wide, 20 feet deep, and 6 feet high. It was built to furnish large quantities of bread for Italian immigrant railroad workers in a work camp during 1891–1893.

It was listed on the National Register of Historic Places in 2006.
