= James Sanders House =

Historic house in New York, United States

- U.S. National Register of Historic Places
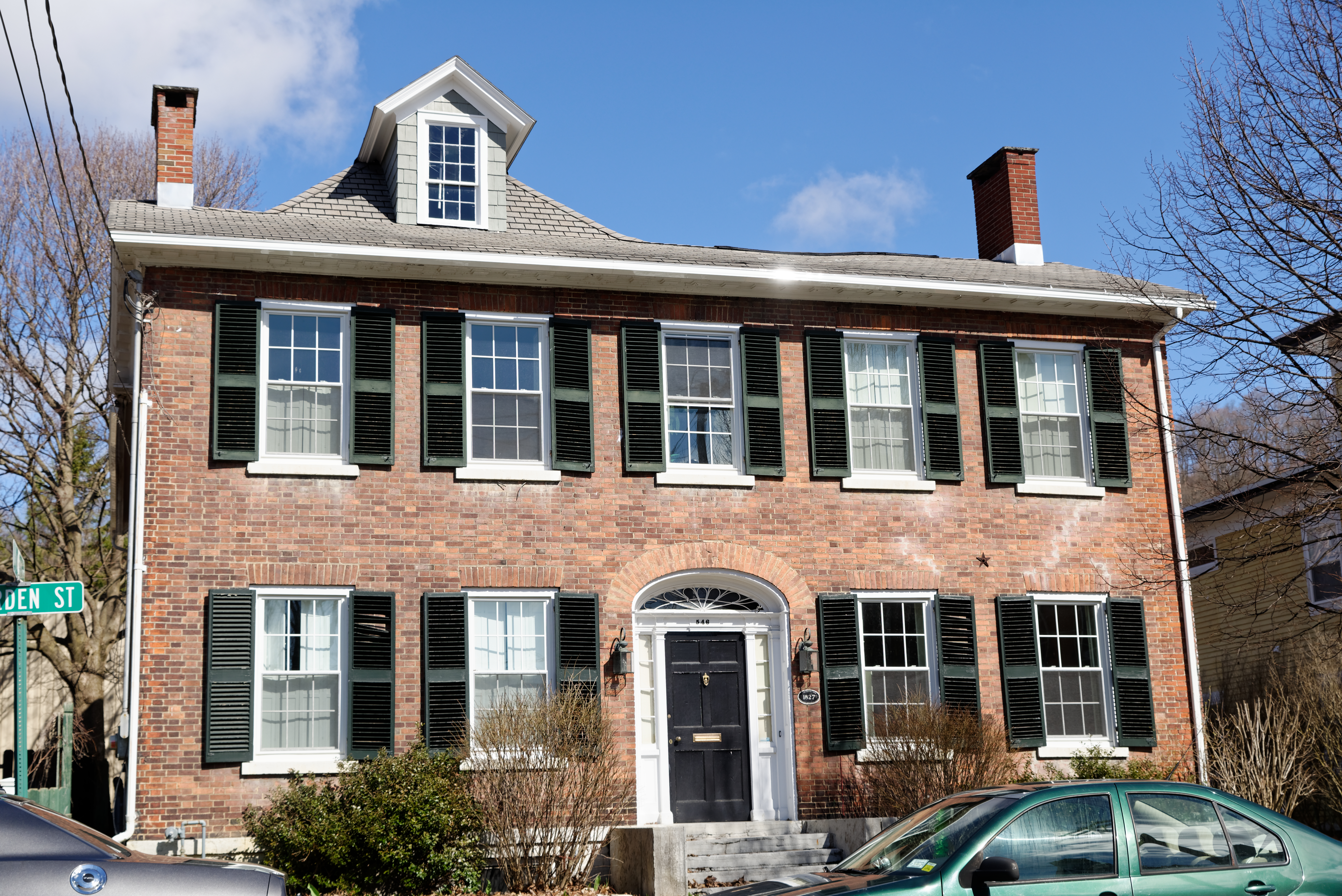
- James Sanders House, April 2019

- Location within New York Location within the United States
- Interactive map of James Sanders House
- Location: 546 Garden St., Little Falls, New York
- Coordinates: 43°2′43″N 74°51′28″W
- Area: less than one acre
- Built: 1827
- Architectural style: Federal
- NRHP reference No.: 06000255
- Added to NRHP: April 12, 2006

James Sanders House is a historic home located at Little Falls in Herkimer County, New York. The house is a two-story, gable-roofed brick residence, five bays long and two bays wide, originally constructed in 1827. It consists of a rectangular main block with a two-story brick rear wing. It features a center hall plan and Federal-style decorative elements. Also on the property are a frame, gable-roofed carriage barn and garage/agricultural equipment barn. James Sanders was a local building contractor who also built a number of mills, residences, and civic buildings including the original Little Falls Academy.

It was listed on the National Register of Historic Places in 2006. It is located in the Little Falls Historic District.
