= Earl R. Miller =

American diplomat (born 1958)

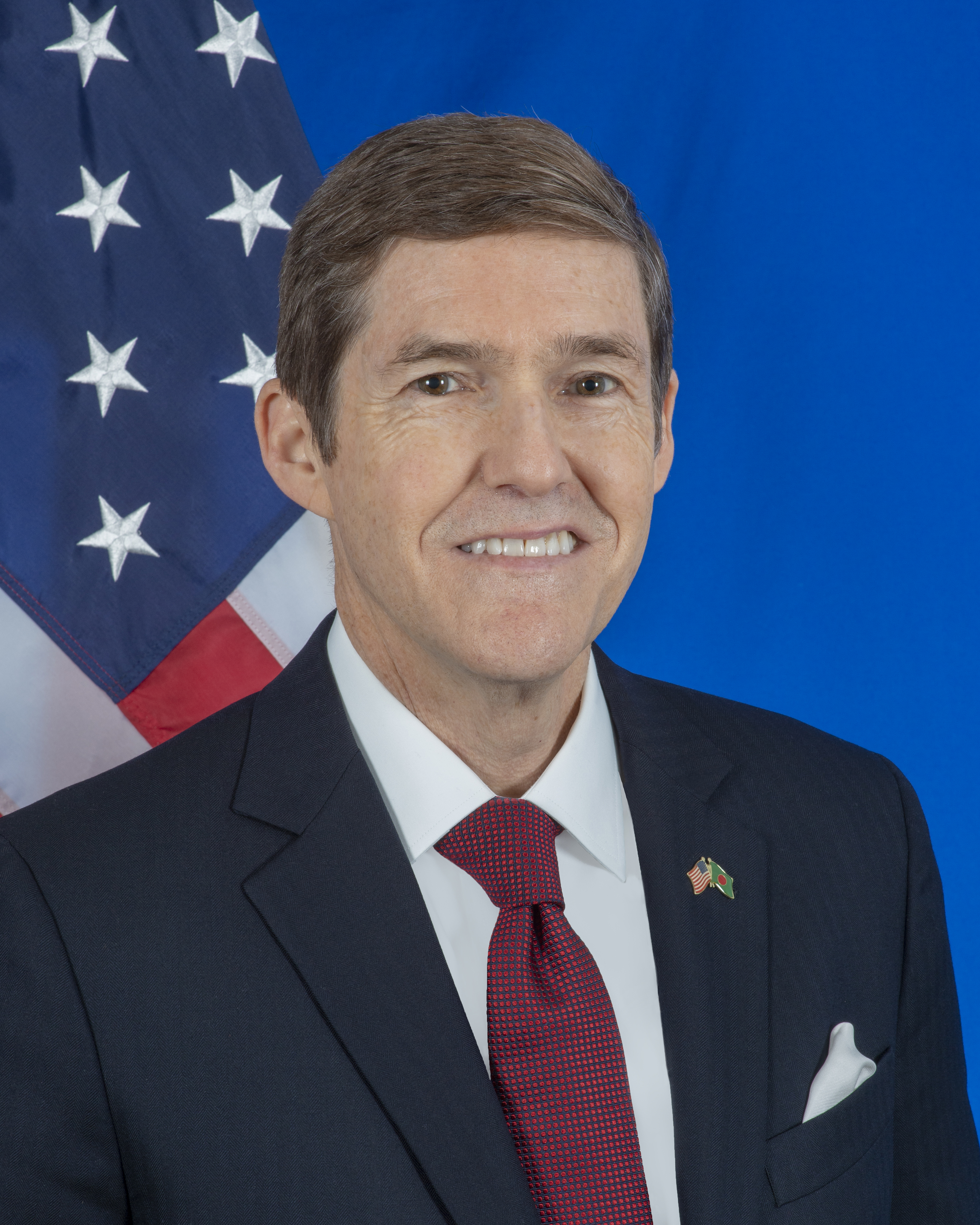

20th United States Ambassador to Eswatini (ad interim)
- In office January 27, 2023 – October 27, 2022
- President: Joe Biden
- Preceded by: Caitlin Piper
- Succeeded by: Caitlin Piper

17th United States Ambassador to Bangladesh
- In office December 18, 2014 – September 24, 2018
- President: Barack Obama; Donald Trump
- Preceded by: Michelle D. Gavin
- Succeeded by: Craig Lewis Cloud

Personal details
- Born: 1958 (age 67–68)
- Children: 2
- Education: University of Michigan (BA)

Military service
- Allegiance: United States
- Branch/service: United States Marine Corps
- Years of service: 1981–1985 (Active); 1985–1992 (Reserves)
- Battles/wars: Gulf War

Earl Robert Miller (born 1958) is an American diplomat who served as the United States ambassador to Bangladesh from 2018 to 2022. He previously served as U.S. Ambassador to Botswana from 2014 to 2018.

Earl Miller appointed as Chargé d'Affaires Eswatini on January 27, 2023.

Earl Miller served as the Peace Corps Country director for Mongolia from December 2023 until May 2025.

== Education ==
Miller graduated from the University of Michigan with a Bachelor of Arts in 1981.

== Career ==
Miller served as a United States Marine Corps officer where served on active duty until 1984 and in the reserves until 1992 where he took part in the Persian Gulf War. He joined the United States Department of State in 1987 where he initially worked as a desk officer in the agency's Southern Africa section. He then joined the Diplomatic Security Service as a special agent in Miami, San Francisco, and assistant regional security officer in El Salvador. In 1995, Miller became the regional security officer (RSO) for the U.S. embassy in Gaborone, Botswana. He served in this capacity in a number of countries including Malaysia, Indonesia, Iraq, and India. While posted in Malaysia, Miller took part in the investigation of an ambush in eastern Indonesia that saw two U.S. schoolteachers murdered. He was the Consul General of the United States to South Africa in Johannesburg from 2011 to 2014.

Starting December 18, 2014, Miller served as the United States Ambassador to Botswana. In January 2018, Miller was asked by Botswana government officials if the State Department regarded Botswana as a "shithole" country after President Donald Trump was reported to have used that word to refer to African nations in a private meeting on immigration with lawmakers. Miller was awarded the Award for Heroism from the Diplomatic Security Service, the Shield of Bravery from the Federal Bureau of Investigation (FBI), and the Secretary's Distinguished Service Award from Secretary of State Antony Blinken on May 20, 2022. He is fluent in Indonesian, French, and Spanish.

In July 2018, Miller was nominated by President Donald Trump to be the next U.S. Ambassador to Bangladesh.

During the 2018 Bangladesh election violence he expressed his concern and played a crucial role in restoring peace and end violence. Miller left Bangladesh on January 21, 2022.

== Personal life ==
Miller was previously married to Ana Miller, originally an El Salvadoran national. They have two sons, Alexander and Andrew. Miller speaks French, Spanish, and Indonesian.

== See also ==
- Bangladesh - United States relations

Diplomatic posts
Preceded by Michelle D. Gavin	United States Ambassador to Botswana; 2015–2018	Succeeded by Craig Cloud
Preceded by Marcia Bernicat	United States Ambassador to Bangladesh; 2018–2022	Succeeded by Peter D. Haas
