= Howard Van Vranken =

American diplomat

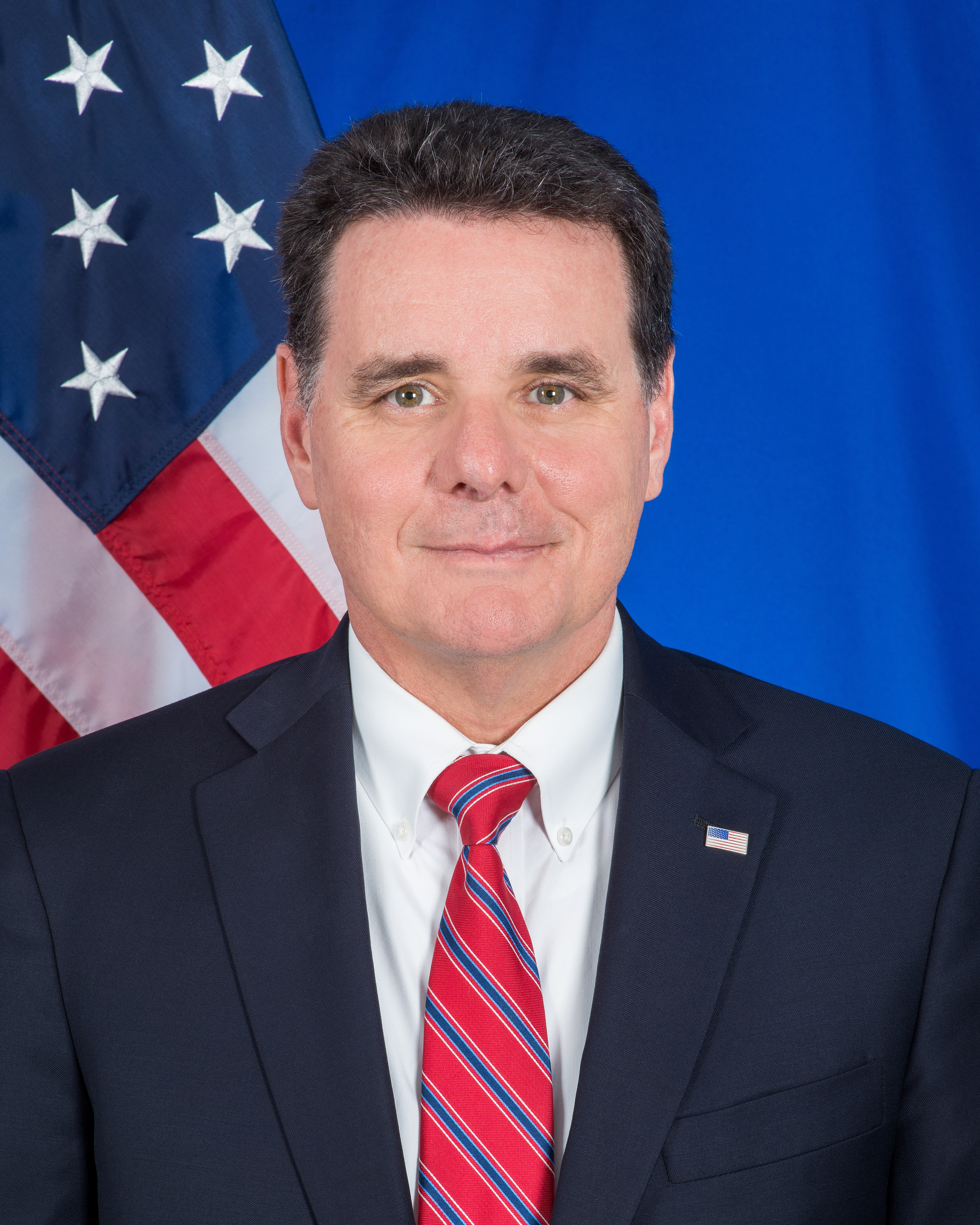

United States Ambassador to Botswana
- In office May 24, 2023 – August 26, 2026
- President: Joe Biden; Donald Trump
- Preceded by: Craig Lewis Cloud

Personal details
- Born: Howard Andree Van Vranken
- Education: University of California, Davis (BA); Harvard University (MA)

Howard Andree Van Vranken is an American diplomat who had served as the United States Ambassador to Botswana.

== Education ==
Van Vranken earned a Bachelor of Arts degree from the University of California, Davis and a Master of Arts from Harvard University. Van Vranken graduated from Armijo High School in Fairfield, California.

== Career ==
A career officer with the United States Foreign Service, Van Vranken has been assigned to embassies in Jerusalem, Sanaa, Oslo, Beirut, Tel Aviv, Belfast, and Tunis. He has also worked in the Bureau of Near Eastern Affairs and Bureau of South and Central Asian Affairs. He has most recently served as executive director and deputy executive secretary of the United States Department of State.

=== Ambassador to Botswana ===
On July 16, 2021, President Joe Biden nominated Van Vranken to be the next United States Ambassador to Botswana. On September 29, 2021, a hearing on his nomination was held before the Senate Foreign Relations Committee. On October 19, 2021, his nomination was reported favorably out of committee. The full Senate voted to confirm Van Vraken by voice vote on December 21, 2022, more than a year later. He presented his credentials to President Mokgweetsi Masisi on May 24, 2023.

== Awards and recognitions ==
Van Vranken is the recipient of the Presidential Distinguished Service Award.

== Personal life ==
Van Vranken speaks Arabic, Persian, and Norwegian.
