= Theodore C. Maino =

Theodore C. Maino (October 29, 1913 – 1997) was a political appointee who served as the American Ambassador to Botswana. A close friend of William P. Clark Jr. and an avid big game hunter, the construction company executive “ asked the White House to appoint him Ambassador to Kenya, a country whose game parks are among the best in the world.” The post wasn't available but in October 1982, he was off to Botswana as Ambassador. He served until 1985.,

Maino was president of Maino Construction Co., Inc., in San Luis Obispo, California since 1954 and vice president and general superintendent from 1946 to 1954. He was owner of Maino Properties Commercial Rentals in 1954-1981 and chairman of the board of Swift Air Lines, Inc. from 1969 to 1980. He was president of San Luis Obispo Savings and Loan Association in 1967-1975 and was director of Central Savings and Loan Association in 1946–1967. Maino graduated from the University of Santa Clara (R.S., 1935).
