= John F. Kordek =

American diplomat (1938–2021)

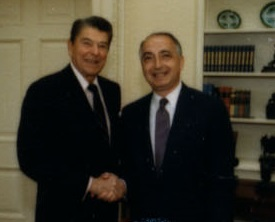
John Florian Kordek and Ronald Reagan

John Florian Kordek (1938 – February 16, 2021) was an American diplomat who served as the United States Ambassador Extraordinary and Plenipotentiary to Botswana (1988–1989).

Kordek has also been Associate Vice President for External Relations at DePaul University in Chicago. Kordek was also an alumnus of DePaul University (1964, geography major) as well as the Johns Hopkins School of Advanced Studies (M.A, 1967). He was also a veteran of the U.S. Air Force. In 2000, Bill Clinton appointed him to the Holocaust Memorial Council.
