= Tan rabbit =

Breed of rabbit

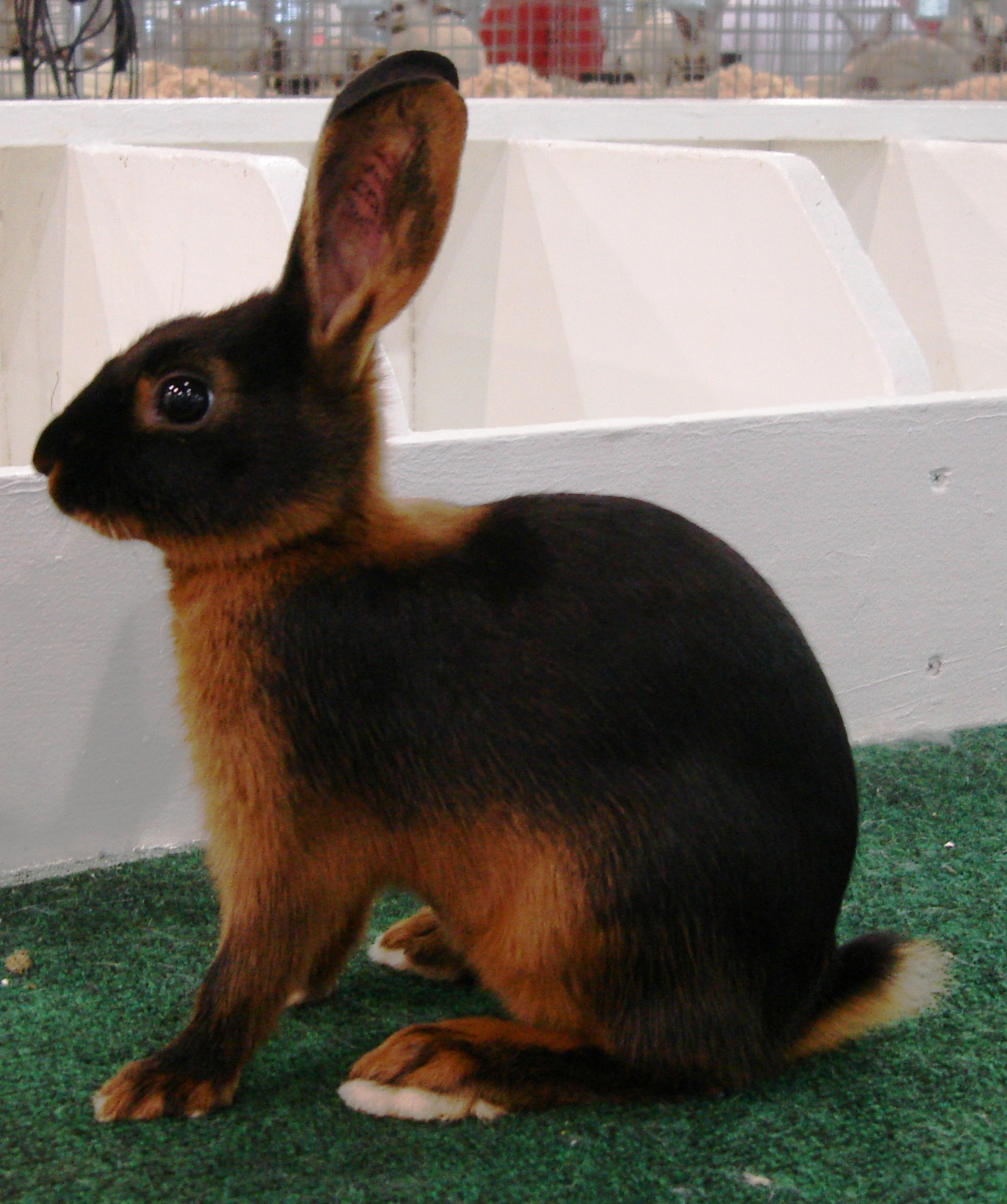
A Tan rabbit in the black variety

The Tan rabbit is a small fancy breed of rabbit shown throughout the world. While originally from England, it has gained popularity in the United States. Tans come in four varieties: black, blue, chocolate and lilac. Full grown Tans weigh 4-6 pounds.

== About Tans ==
Tans originally come from England where they have been shown since the late 1800s.

In the United States, the accepted adult weight ranges are:

- Does (females): 4 - 6 pounds
- Bucks (males): 4 - 5½ pounds

Tans are a full-arched breed. Rabbits with this type show an arch starting at the nape of their neck, running smoothly over their shoulders, midsection and hips. Tans have a very lean, compact, well balanced body. Tans should be short and deep in body type. They are visually striking because of their unique markings, contrast and intensity of their coloration. There are four varieties (colors) in the Tan breed: black, blue, chocolate and lilac. All four varieties have identical patterned markings. The Tan coloration is an intense, deep red color that is should be even from the chest to tail.

=== Feeding ===
Tans are usually fed a diet of pellets, sometimes supplemented with hay. Some strains of Tans are lighter in weight than others and are often associated with the West Coast of the United States. These lines typically do not have an issue with exceeding the maximum weight as standardized by the American Rabbit Breeders Association and some may even struggle to make the minimum weight. Other lines can be heavier and may have more of an inclination towards going overweight. These are more common in the Eastern United States. Most breeders recommend a heaping half cup of pellets once a day.

=== Housing ===
Tans are a fairly small rabbit but should still be housed in an enclosure at least 3 square feet and 14 inches tall. They enjoy receiving regular exercise. Cages preferably should be all-wire otherwise as this helps prevent respiratory disease and parasites. If the rabbit is to be housed in a hutch with solid sides and a solid roof, at least part of the cage should be made of wire to promote ventilation.

== Breeding ==
There are four varieties (colors) in the Tan breed: Black, Blue, Chocolate and lilac. Tans are shown by variety, not group under the American Rabbit Breeders Association. In terms of color genetics (as with all domestic rabbits) there are two basic informal color groups: black/blue and chocolate/lilac. Blue is the recessive of black and lilac is the recessive of chocolate.

While the average Tan litter is around 4 babies, litter sizes can vary. Tans are not known for having common genetic defects. In general, most Tan babies will be born healthy. Stress related issues can be reduced by not allowing strangers in the barn and keeping a calm environment for the first week or so following kindling (birth). Additionally, Tans that are raised with frequent handling will be calmer.

All Tans are born with the patterned markings, possessing the "Tan pattern" on the A-series gene, as opposed to "agouti" or "self." As a result "mismarked" kits do not occur, unlike in other marked breeds such as Dutch, English Spots, etc. While marking, type and color quality will vary, typically the whole of the litter produced will meet the minimum requirements to be shown at an ARBA sanctioned show.

The American Tan Rabbit Specialty Club also hosts a Tan National Show each spring in a different location within the United States.

== Showing ==
In the United States, the ARBA Standard of Perfection is the official publication that outlines the show requirements for each breed. "All breed" shows are held in various locations throughout the country and around the world. At these shows, all ARBA accepted breeds will compete within their respective breed for the Best of Breed honor. Afterwards, all Best of Breeds compete for Best in Show.

Tans are a full-arch body type judged as a "running breed" in the United States. This means they are allowed to move freely on the show table as they are evaluated by the judge to best evaluate the type, color and markings of the animal. Other full-arch body type rabbits include the Britannia Petite, Belgian Hare, Rhinelander, Checkered Giant and English Spot. The latter three are also "running" breeds with the first two being posed, as with most breeds.

In the United Kingdom the British Rabbit Council (BRC) determines the show criteria for their sanctioned shows. The National Tan Rabbit Club is also the breed club for the breed in the United Kingdom and was the first breed club ever to represent the Tan Rabbit for enthusiasts.

== See also ==
- List of rabbit breeds
- Brown Chestnut of Lorraine
