= Dorothy Burney Richards =

American conservationist (1894–1985)

- Richards and Hunk
- Born: April 7, 1894; Little Falls, New York, U.S.
- Died: August 1, 1985 (aged 91)
- Occupations: Naturalist, conservationist
- Known for: Beaversprite

Dorothy Burney Richards (April 7, 1894 – August 1, 1985) was an American conservationist. She is known for founding and operating Beaversprite with her husband Al Richards. Beaversprite is a tamed beaver sanctuary in Fulton County, New York.

== Early life ==
Richards was born in Little Falls, New York in 1894 to James G. Burney and Laura Crouse Burney. She had two siblings, Marian and Jack. She married Allison "Al" Richards in 1920. He worked as a forester until the Great Depression, for which he and Dorothy moved throughout New York State and Canada. They returned to Little Falls in 1930, where they purchased an office supply firm. They also purchased and restored a dilapidated cottage about ten miles to the northeast of Little Falls, at the base of the Adirondacks.

== Beaversprite ==
New York State had been making efforts to restore the North American beaver population in the Adirondacks, which had nearly been extirpated due to overtrapping. Al made a request in 1935 to the New York State Department of Environmental Conservation to release a pair of beavers on Littlesprite creek near the Richards' cottage, which was approved. Initially waylaid by business concerns, Dorothy later became fascinated by the pair, whom she named Samson and Delilah ("Lilah"). She and Al began taking poplar branches to the beaver pond for food, and Dorothy spent hours sitting by the pond. Al purchased a camera for taking pictures of the beavers. During the winters, Dorothy read what literature on beavers was available at the time, such as Pilgrims of the Wild by beaver conservationist Archibald Stansfeld Belaney (a.k.a. "Grey Owl"), and also mentioned reading Thoreau, Muir, Schweitzer, Krutch, and Lorenz. Richards became a vegetarian to "strengthen the statement she wanted her life to make."

The Richards began purchasing adjacent land to establish a nature sanctuary, initially using borrowed funds. With the Richards' help, the beaver population grew. Despite having no scientific background, Dorothy observed the beavers and took notes on their behavior. She wanted more extensive first-hand experience, so in 1943 she asked the Department of Environmental Conservation for permission to keep beavers in her home. The department was reluctant, as at the time zoos had only been able to keep beavers alive for a few years in captivity. Dorothy invited a state legislator to visit the sanctuary, and her license was issued shortly after, the first such permit in New York State. The Richards dug a 5 by 10 feet (1.5 by 3.0 m) beaver pool in their basement, fed by the nearby stream, which would be enlarged later on.

Later, they replaced the cottage's woodshed with an enclosed concrete pool they called "The Y", for its resemblance to the swimming pool at a YMCA. At the time eleven beavers lived indoors. Al retired in 1957 and Dorothy ran the business for some time afterward. He died in 1963: the last of this generation of indoor beavers died a few years later. Dorothy initially declared herself finished with the indoor beaver experiment, but when two orphaned kits were brought to the cottage, she began raising a new generation of indoor beavers.

Dorothy served as director of the Defenders of Wildlife from 1948 to 1976, and honorary director from 1976 to her death. CBS aired a documentary on Beaversprite in 1972 and Dorothy later appeared on NBC's Real People and in the National Wildlife Federation's Ranger Rick magazine. She played a role, with other advocates, in the beaver becoming the official state animal of New York in 1975. In 1977 she wrote an autobiographical book about the sanctuary, Beaversprite, with Hope Sawyer Buyukmihci, a writer and owner of a beaver sanctuary near Vineland, New Jersey.

In 1966, Dorothy donated her home and 735 acres of land to the Florence Waring Erdman Trust, a Philadelphia-based sponsor of wildlife sanctuaries. Girard Bank, later to merge with Mellon Bank, managed the trust; the Natural Lands Trust managed the land on behalf of the Erdman Trust after 1983. The Erdman Trust added land to the sanctuary, and in 1973 opened a nature center on 1300 acres. Richards was critical of how the sanctuary was being managed, calling the managers of the property "sneaky underhanded nitwits." She lived at the property until her death.

== Death and legacy ==
Dorothy died in 1985 at the age of 91; the last beaver to live in the house followed in 1987. At the time 40 beavers lived on the property in six lodges.

After Dorothy's death, Beaversprite was closed to the public, despite a section in her will requesting it stay open. Her will also left $1 million "for the creation of wildlife sanctuaries in memory of her mother, Florence Jones Reineman, where hunting, trapping and fishing would be prohibited." Richards' friends and colleagues formed the Friends of Beaversprite and began to take action against the Erdman Trust. Cleveland Amory, Doris Day, and Bob Barker were among Friends of Beaversprite supporters. In 1988 the Friends of Beaversprite initiated a boycott of Mellon Bank: the kickoff press conference was held in front of the Girard Trust Bank building and featured a 20-foot inflatable beaver.

In 1989 they filed suit against the Erdman Trust and sanctuary manager Larry B. Watkins for mismanagement. Watkins was accused of hunting and logging on the sanctuary grounds, using sanctuary staff for personal labor, and retaliating against whistleblowers. They successfully lobbied to have Watkins, the Erdman Trust, and the Natural Lands Trust removed. Friends of Beaversprite changed their name to Beavers: Wetlands & Wildlife in 1996; the organization does public outreach and consults with people trying to coexist with beavers.

The Utica Zoo acquired Beaversprite in 2020 and reopened it to the public as the Beaversprite Nature Center.

The achievements and dedication of Richards are part of the celebration of International Beaver Day on her birthday, April 7.
