= Beaver Woman =

Beaver Woman may refer to:

- Beaver Woman Lake, a lake in Montana
- Dorothy Burney Richards (1894–1985), American conservationist and founder of Beaversprite

== See also ==
- Beaver (surname)
