= Utica Zoo =

Regional zoo in Utica, New York

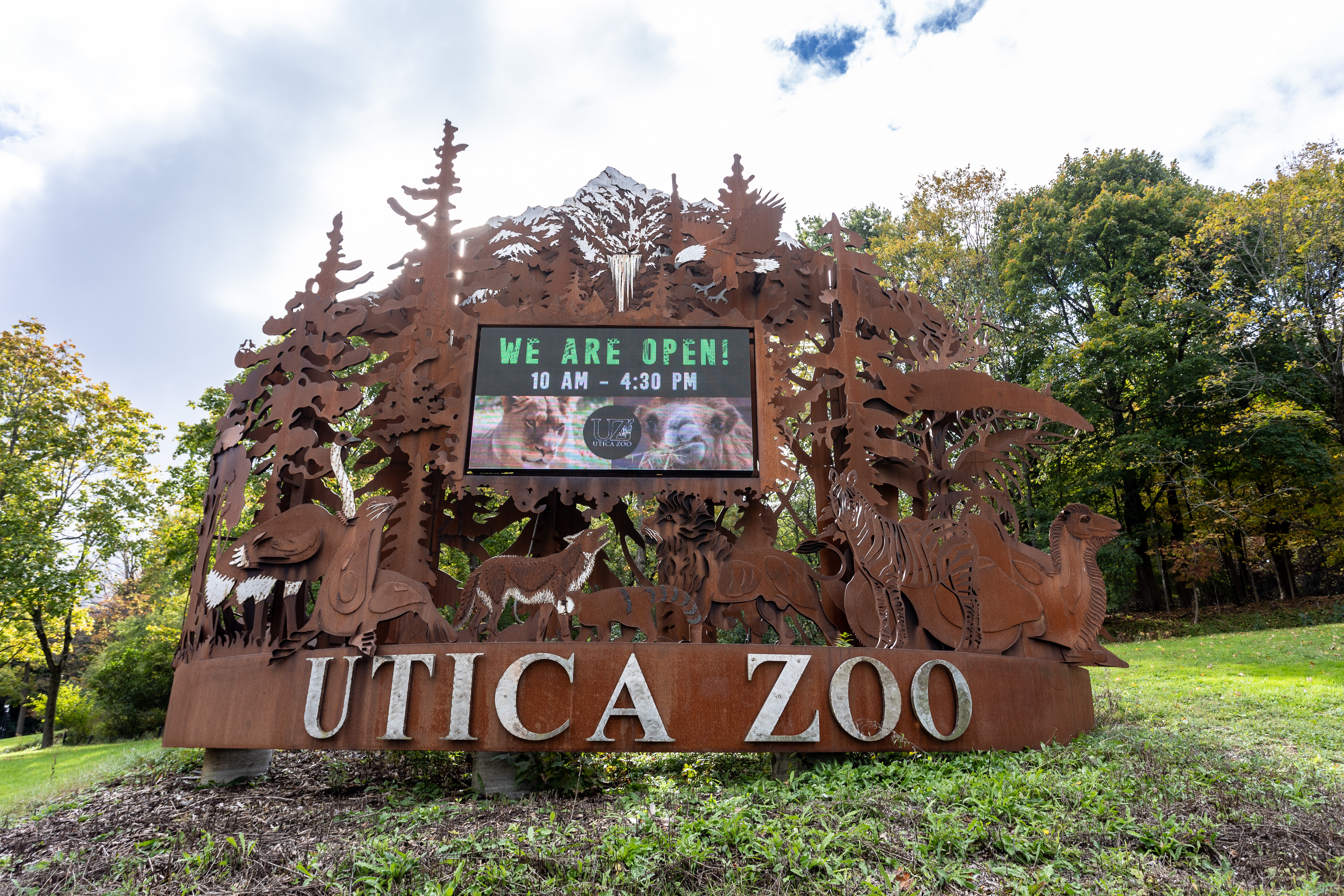
- Utica Zoo entrance sign
- Interactive map of Utica Zoo
- 43.082°N 75.246°W
- Date opened: 1914
- Location: 1 Utica Zoo Way, Utica, New York, US
- Land area: 40 acres (16 ha)
- No. of animals: 200
- No. of species: 99
- Memberships: AZA
- Website: uticazoo.org

Utica Zoo is a regional zoo in Utica, New York, situated in a section of Roscoe Conkling Park. It consists of a mixture of outdoor and indoor animal enclosures, a petting zoo, nature trails, and other amenities.

The Utica Zoo is primarily funded by the Oneida County government, the New York State Natural Heritage Program, and fundraising by the zoo and private donors. The City of Utica does not financially support the zoo at present, although it still owns the land occupied by the zoo.

== Animals ==
The Utica Zoo has over 200 animals representing 99 species, with 6 different on exhibit sections.

The African Ridge houses animals from Africa, including East African lions, striped hyenas, mountain zebras, ostriches, a red-tailed hawk, and African painted dogs. Species previously held here include Rüppell's vultures, ring-tailed lemurs, and a serval.

The Forever Forests houses animals from Central and South America, including Chinese red pandas, Mexican spider monkeys, and white-handed gibbons. Species previously held here include porcupines.

The Scales and Tails section is an indoor habitat housing reptiles and small mammals including a Burmese python, wood turtles, prehensile-tailed skinks, Jamaican boas, an Everglades rat snake, box turtles, Mexican beaded lizards, a Uromastyx lizard, lion tamarins, and a Chilean rose-haired tarantula. Species previously held here include cotton-top tamarins, Henkel's leaf-tailed geckos, and an Asian elephant.

The Asian Realm houses animals from Asia, including white-naped cranes, Reeves's muntjac, Bennett's wallabies, emus, sulcata tortoises, Chinese alligators, Karakul sheep, Transcaspian urials, a Bactrian camel, and northern bald eagles. Species previously held here include Siberian tigers, Visayan warty pigs, and black swans.

The North Trek houses animals from North America, including Canadian lynxes, Mexican wolves, and a Pallas's cat. Species previously held here include Arctic foxes, woodland caribou, and snowy owls.

The Backyards and Barnyards houses animals from your backyard, including Jacob sheep, North American river otters, a night heron, golden pheasants, alpacas, miniature zebus, miniature donkeys, Western barn owls, chickens, beavers, Vietnamese pot-bellied pigs, Nigerian dwarf goats, and Patagonian cavies. Species previously held here include California sea lions, red foxes, and English spot rabbits.

Their Ambassador Animals are in the private building next to their Scales and Tails, and you can only see those animals in an Animal Encounter, Zoomobile, or a birthday party. They include dwarf hedgehogs, rabbits, long-tailed chinchillas, turtles, snakes, tarantulas, lizards, lesser tenrecs, armadillos, hyacinth macaws, frogs, degus, and owls.

== History ==
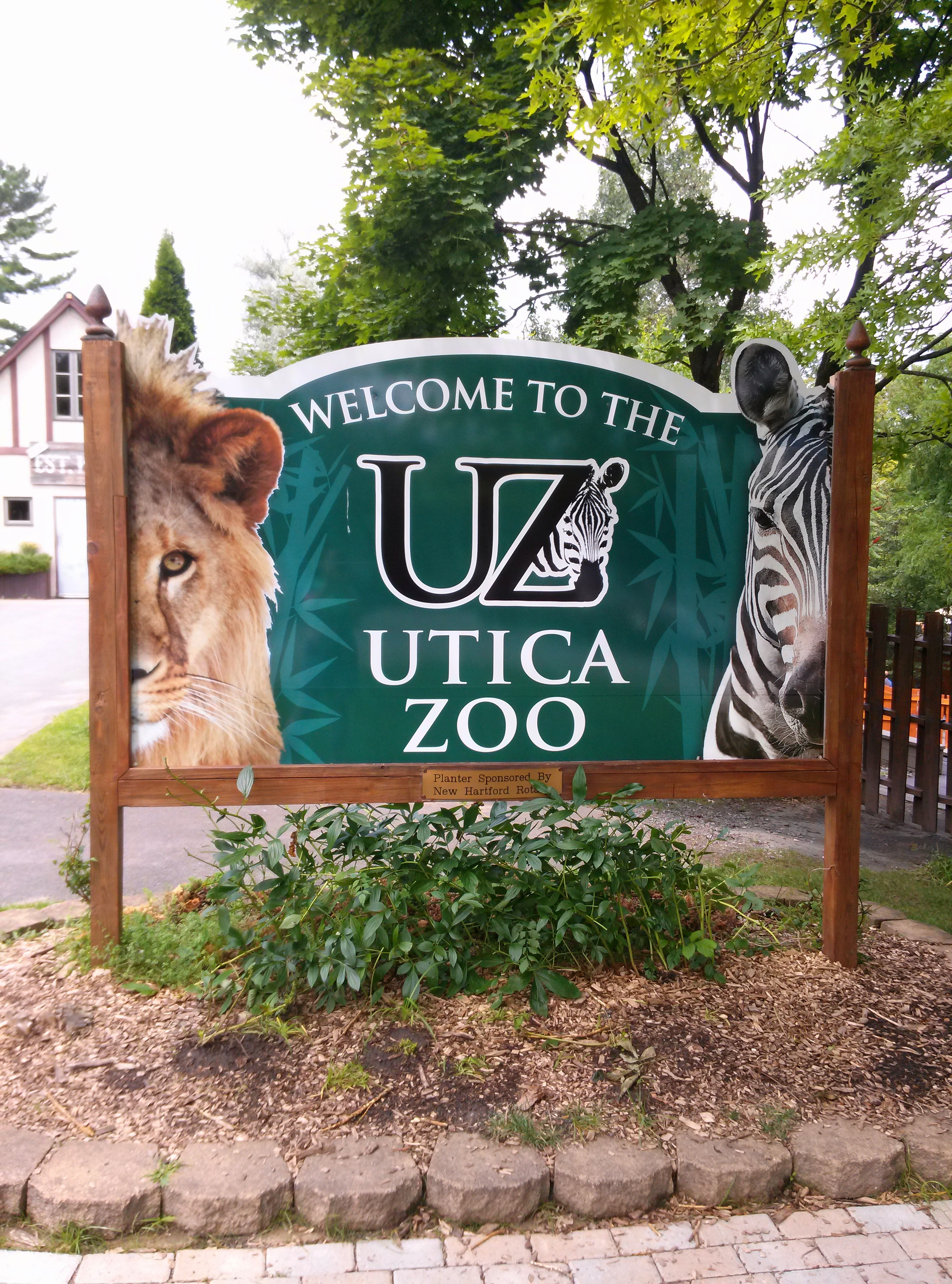
Welcome sign at the Utica Zoo

The Utica Zoo was founded in 1914 with an initial collection of three fallow deer. The City of Utica owns the 80 acres (32 ha) of zoo property, of which 40 is currently developed. The first permanent building was erected in 1920. The City of Utica Parks Department managed the zoo until 1964, when responsibility was transferred to a dedicated organization, currently known as the Utica Zoological Society. This organization was later chartered by the State of New York as an educational institution. The first professional zoo director was hired in 1966.

In 2000, a 15.5-foot-tall (4.7 m) metal sculpture of a watering can, originally built using city funds by request of Mayor Ed Hanna, was obtained by the zoo. This sculpture is listed by Guinness World Records as the world's largest watering can.

In 2004, amid financial issues, the zoo was forced to defer maintenance on its facilities, and consequently lost accreditation from the Association of Zoos and Aquariums. The zoo began pursuing re-accreditation in 2011 after paying off its debts. The white-handed gibbon exhibit was noted as particularly outdated. Between 2015 and 2018, the zoo held fundraising campaigns to rehabilitate the primate building, and received grants from the state and county. After several years of planning and restructuring, the Utica Zoo was re-accredited by AZA in 2018. Later in 2018, the first outdoor portion of the primate exhibit was finished.

In 2011, after their Siberian tiger named Minona died, the zoo took in African lions named Bakari and Monni. Prior to their arrival, it had been 30 years since the zoo had lions. The two gave birth to three cubs, and were rehomed once the cubs reached maturity: as of 2022 the cubs still live at the Utica Zoo. In 2019, the zoo's white peacock Merlin was killed by a lion after it flew into their enclosure.

The zoo's red panda couple gave birth to cubs in 2015, as part of the Species Survival Plan for the endangered red pandas. In 2021, both parents died, one of a lung infection and one of a gastrointestinal impaction.

In 2020, the Utica Zoo acquired the Beaversprite nature sanctuary in Fulton County, New York.

In 2021 the zoo rehomed its California sea lions after determining the exhibit was too small for them to exercise freely.

A Hartmann's Mountain Zebra foal was born at the zoo in July 2022.

A white-handed gibbon infant was born January 2023.

In October 2022 zoo employees voted to unionize, and are now represented by the Civil Service Employees Association.

== Conservation ==
The Utica Zoo has participated in in situ conservation and research projects for nearby populations of frosted elfins, Chittenango ovate amber snails, and turtles.

== Gallery ==
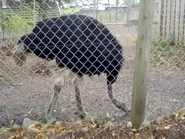
A male ostrich at the Utica Zoo.

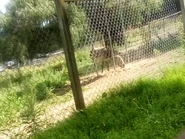
A male Hartmann's mountain zebra in the same enclosure.

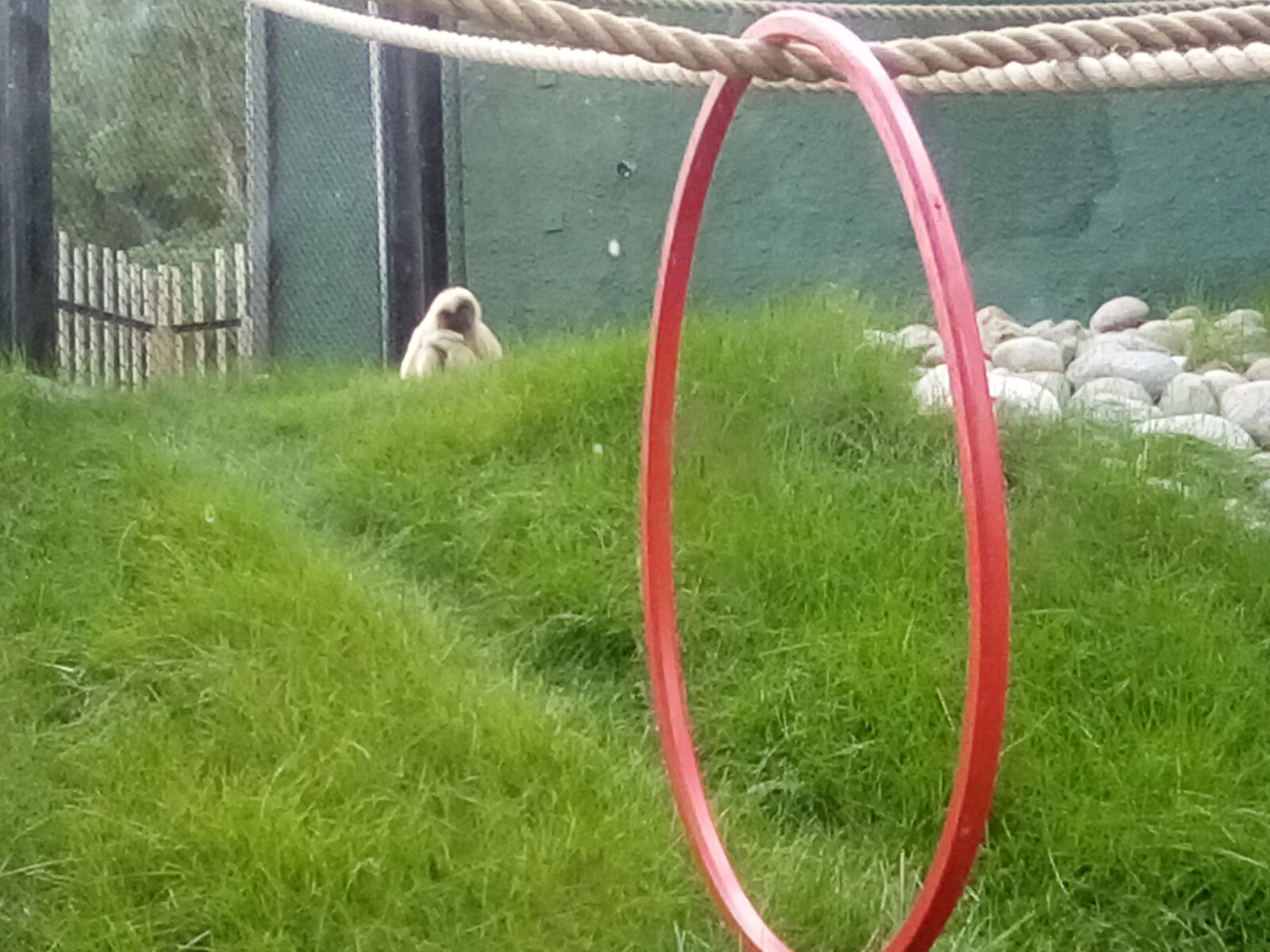

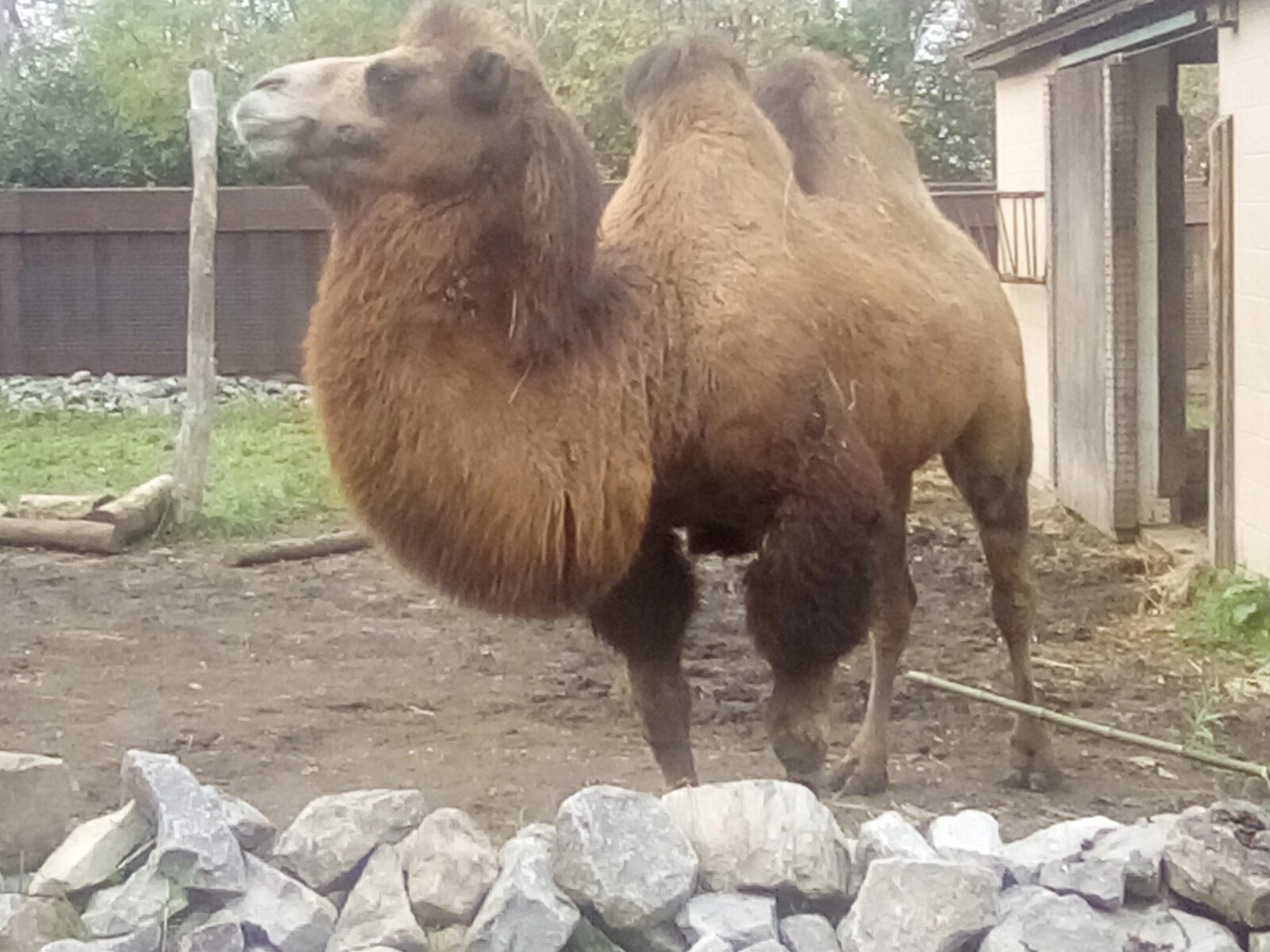

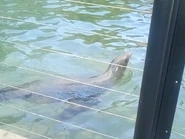
Munchkin, a female California sea lion at the Utica Zoo. (The sea lion exhibit now features North American river otters)

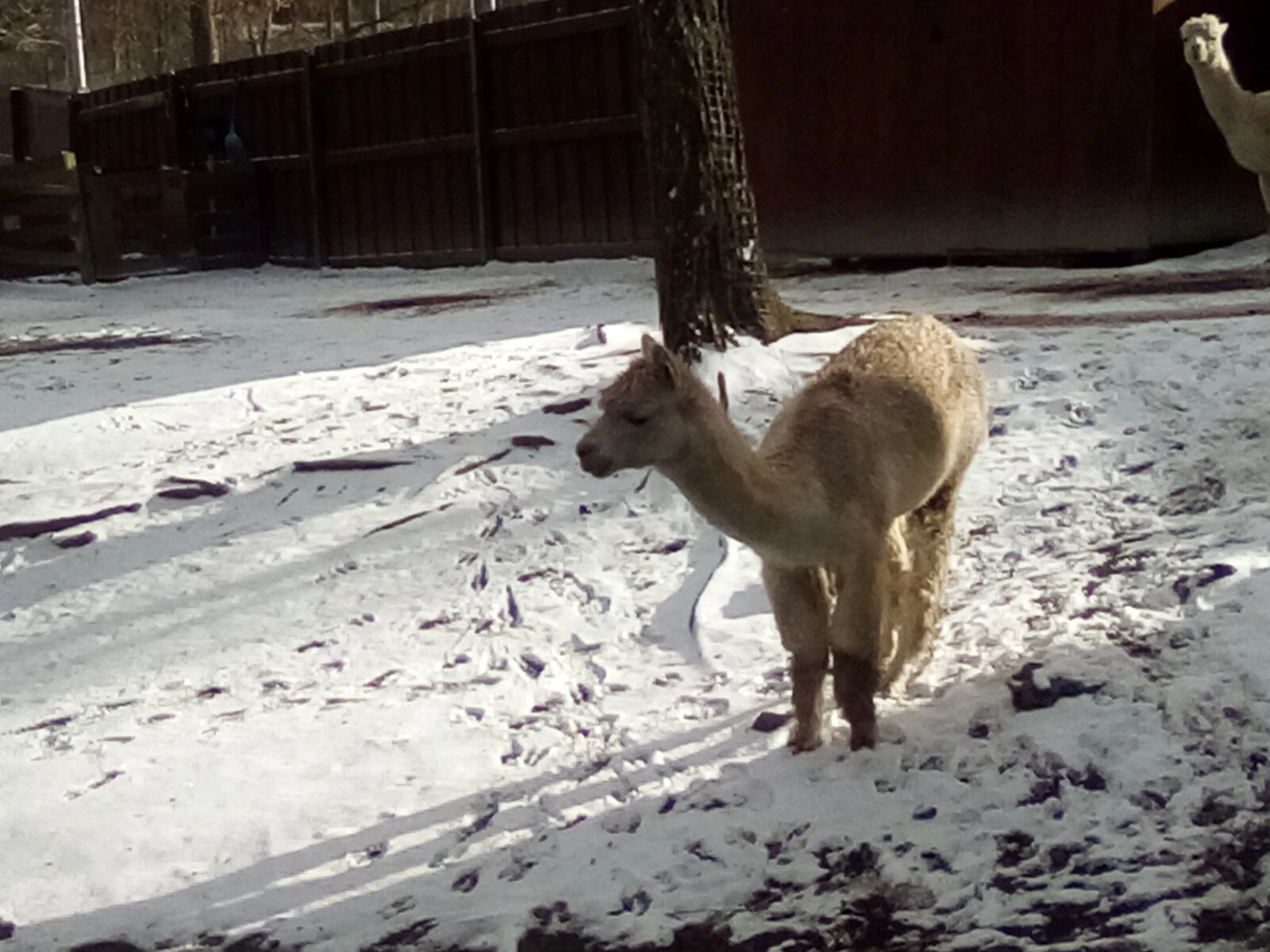
