= Rhineland (disambiguation) =

The Rhineland (German: Rheinland) is an area of Western Germany along the river Rhine.

Rhineland or Rheinland may also refer to:

== Places ==
Canada

- Rural Municipality of Rhineland, Manitoba
- Municipality of Rhineland, Manitoba, successor to the rural municipality
- Rhineland (electoral district), a former Manitoba provincial electoral district
- Rhineland, Ontario

Germany

- Rhineland-Palatinate, a Bundesland (federal state) of Germany

The Netherlands

- Rijnland, Dutch for Rhineland, a historical region of the Netherlands around the Rhine

United States

- Missouri Rhineland, an area of Missouri
- Rhineland, Missouri, a populated place in the center of the Missouri Rhineland
- Rhineland, Texas, an unincorporated community

== Other uses ==
- 6070 Rheinland, an asteroid
- Ford Rheinland, an automobile built by Ford Germany from 1933 to 1936
- SS Rheinland a number of ships with this name
- SMS Rheinland, a German battleship, 1908–1922
- SS Rhineland (1938) a British cargo ship in service 1948–56

== See also ==
- Rhinelander (disambiguation)
