= Rhinelander =

Rhinelander can refer to a person from Rhineland, Germany.

Rhinelander can also refer to:

== Places ==
- Rhinelander, Wisconsin, a city in the United States

- Rhinelander-Oneida County Airport, an airport that serves Rhinelander, Wisconsin, USA
- Rhinelander High School, a school that serves Rhinelander, Wisconsin, USA
- Rhinelander Brewing Company, a craft brewery located in Rhinelander, Wisconsin, USA

== Animals ==
- Rhenish Warmblood or Rhineländer, a German breed of warmblood horse
- Rhinelander rabbit, a German breed of rabbit

== Structures ==
- Rhinelander Mansion in New York City, USA

== People ==
- Frederic W. Rhinelander (1828–1904), an American who served as president of the Metropolitan Museum of Art.
- Gertrude Rhinelander Waldo (1842–1914), an American heiress
- Thomas Jackson Oakley Rhinelander (1858–1946), an American real estate magnate and society leader
- Philip M. Rhinelander (1869–1939), bishop of the Episcopal Diocese of Pennsylvania
- Edith Cruger Sands Rhinelander (1874–1923), an American socialite
- Rhinelander Waldo (1877–1927), an early 20th-century American fire commissioner, then police commissioner, of New York City, USA
- Anita Rhinelander Stewart (later Princess Miguel of Braganza) (1886–1977), an American socialite and heiress
- Leonard "Kip" Rhinelander (1903 – 1936), an American socialite in New York City who was the subject of a divorce process (1925) notable for the contemporary discussion of racial issues and for the use of (ethical) photomanipulation in journalism
- Philip H. Rhinelander (1908–1987), philosopher at Stanford University

== Events ==
- Rhinelander v. Rhinelander, a 1925 interracial marriage annulment case

== See also ==
- Rhineland (disambiguation)
