= Beaversprite =

Beaver sanctuary in upstate New York

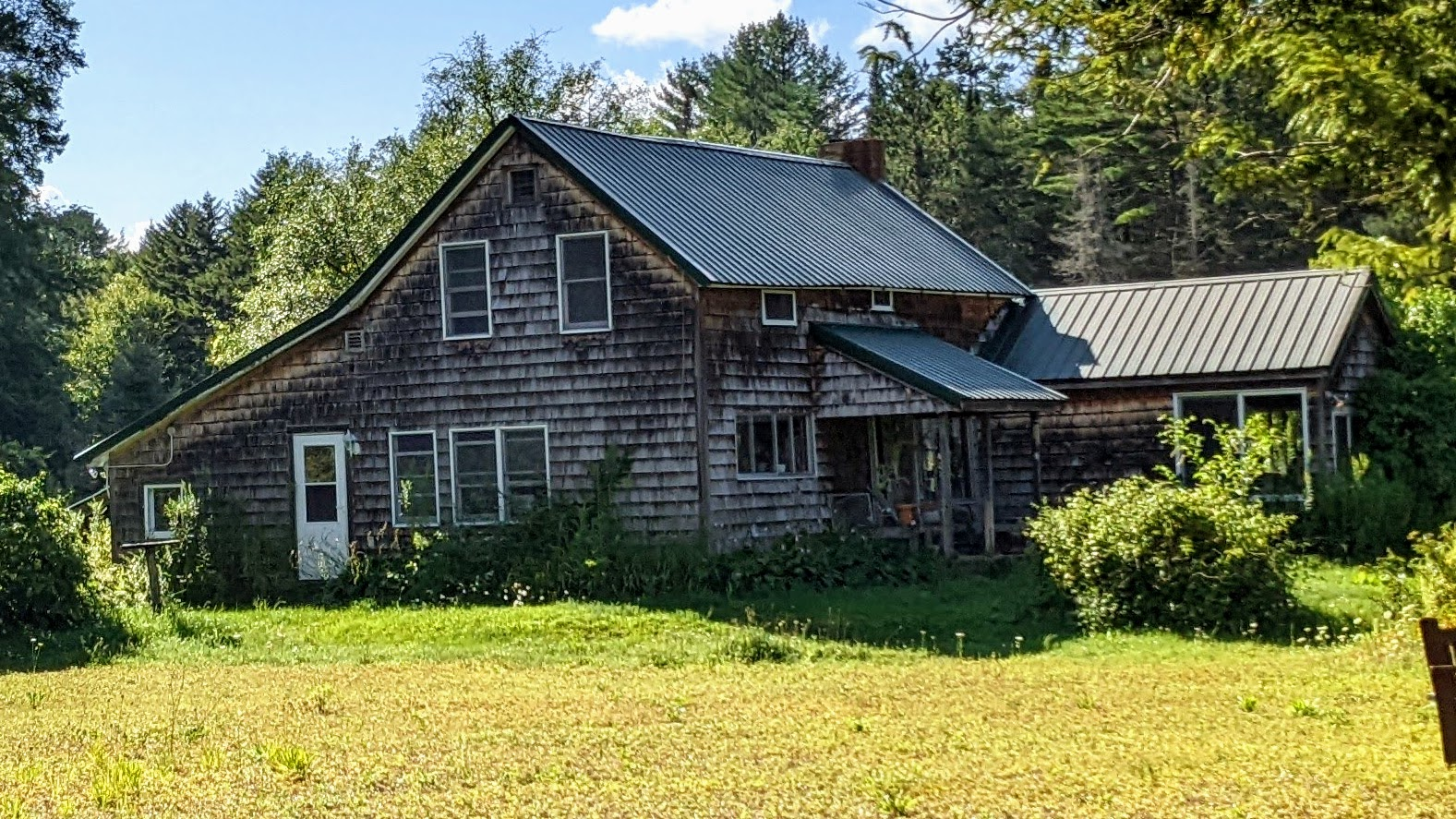
- Cottage at Beaversprite where beavers lived.

- Location within New York Location within the United States
- Location: Fulton County, New York, United States
- Coordinates: 43°06′37″N 74°43′09″W
- Area: 2 sq mi (5.2 km^{2})
- Named for: "Spirit of the beaver", Little and Middle Sprite Creeks
- Owner: Utica Zoo (since 2020)
- Website: Official website

Beaversprite is a nature reserve in Fulton County, New York, with parts in St. Johnsville, Oppenheim, and Dolgeville. It was founded by Dorothy Richards, known as the "Beaver Woman" or "Beaver Lady", and her husband. She tamed beavers in the sanctuary and kept some inside their cottage in the reserve. The Richards made their home open to visitors, where they could have close contact with the creatures.

== History ==
Dorothy Burney Richards (April 7, 1894 – August 1, 1985) was born and raised in Little Falls, New York, as was her husband Allison ("Al", April 16, 1892 – July 21, 1963). Al was a graduate of the first class of the New York State College of Forestry in Syracuse and a veteran of World War I. The two wed in 1920. He worked as a forester until the Great Depression, for which he and Dorothy moved throughout New York State and Canada. They returned to Little Falls in 1930, where they purchased an office supply firm. They also purchased and restored a dilapidated cottage about ten miles to the northeast of Little Falls, at the base of the Adirondacks.

At the time, New York State was making efforts to restore the North American beaver population in the Adirondacks, which had nearly been extirpated due to overtrapping. A college friend of Al's was involved with finding suitable places to release beavers, and during a visit to the cottage declared the area ideal. Al made a request in 1935 to the New York State Department of Environmental Conservation to release a pair of beavers on a creek near the Richards' cottage, which was approved. Initially waylaid by business concerns, Dorothy later became fascinated by the pair, whom she named Samson and Delilah ("Lilah"). She and Al began taking poplar branches to the beaver pond for food, and Dorothy spent hours sitting by the pond. Al purchased a camera for taking pictures of the beavers. During the winters, Dorothy read what literature on beavers was available at the time, such as Pilgrims of the Wild by beaver conservationist Archibald Stansfeld Belaney (a.k.a. "Grey Owl"), and also mentioned reading Thoreau, Muir, Schweitzer, Krutch, and Lorenz. With time, the beavers became comfortable enough with Dorothy to eat apples from her hand.

In 1938 Lilah was injured by a trap, and the Richards brought her into her home to recover. The trapper was eventually found and fined ten dollars. After Lilah was released, the beaver couple left for a period of several years, but eventually returned. The Richards began purchasing adjacent land to establish a nature sanctuary, initially using borrowed funds. This was not entirely welcomed by their neighbors; the Richards had to replace their "No Hunting" signs with metal ones after paper ones were shot full of holes. With the Richards' help, the beaver population grew. Muskrats and various waterfowl, including endangered species of ducks, lived alongside the beavers. Unusually, a beaver from outside Samson and Lilah's lodge, called "Forty", joined them and participated in raising Lilah's kits. Samson and Lilah eventually died after twenty-four years at Beaversprite; at the time, the normal life span of a beaver was thought to be only twelve years.

Despite having no scientific background, Dorothy observed the beavers and took notes on their behavior. She wanted more extensive first-hand experience, so in 1943 she asked the Department of Environmental Conservation for permission to keep beavers in her home. The Department was reluctant, as at the time zoos had only been able to keep beavers alive for a few years in captivity. Dorothy invited a state legislator to visit the sanctuary, and her license was issued shortly after. The Richards dug a 5 by 10 feet (1.5 by 3.0 m) beaver pool in their basement, fed by the nearby stream, which would be enlarged later on. They took two beavers, a male from Forty's litter and a female from Lilah's litter, into their home. Dorothy wrote that the act made them feel like kidnappers, but later described the indoor beavers as seeming happy. Although they gnawed on doors and windowsills and occasionally stole items from the home, the beavers did no structural damage to the cottage. Eventually the indoor beavers mated and produced largely healthy litters. However, the beavers did escape into the wild a number of times, and not all beavers were recaptured. Occasionally young beavers who did not get along were released intentionally. The outdoor beavers did not appear to hold a grudge after their children were taken, nor after two more kits were taken by Al's college friend to stock a reserve elsewhere. In fact, one year Lilah presented Dorothy with two kits from a large litter, as if she were overburdened and needed Dorothy to care for them.

The Richards added a fenced outdoor beaver pond for the indoor beavers to use during the summer. The beavers were let outside at the start of spring and taken back inside at the start of winter. Later, they replaced the cottage's woodshed with an enclosed concrete pool they called "The Y", for its resemblance to the swimming pool at a YMCA. At the time eleven beavers lived indoors. The new pool was accessible from the basement, and a windowed panel in the living room allowed the Richards and their visitors to view it. Later observers saw that the beavers had nearly free rein of the house, and that beavers would come upstairs to entertain visitors when they arrived. Al retired in 1957 and died in 1963: the last of this generation of indoor beavers died a few years later. The widowed Dorothy initially declared herself finished with the indoor beaver experiment, but when two orphaned kits were brought to the cottage, a new generation of indoor beavers began. Dorothy began releasing each litters once they reached two years old, keeping only the original pair and their most recent litter.

Dorothy served as director of the Defenders of Wildlife from 1948 to 1976, and honorary director from 1976 to her death. CBS aired a documentary on Beaversprite in 1972, and Dorothy later appeared on NBC's Real People and in the National Wildlife Federation's Ranger Rick magazine. She played a role, with other advocates, in the beaver becoming the official state animal of New York in 1975. In 1977 she wrote an autobiographical book about the sanctuary, Beaversprite, with Hope Sawyer Buyukmihci, a writer and owner of a beaver sanctuary near Vineland, New Jersey.

In 1966, Dorothy donated her home and 900 acres of land to the Florence Waring Erdman Trust, a Philadelphia-based sponsor of wildlife sanctuaries. Girard Bank, later to merge with Mellon Bank, managed the trust; the Natural Lands Trust managed the land on behalf of the Erdman Trust after 1983. The Erdman Trust added land to the sanctuary, and in 1973 opened a nature center. Initially Dorothy was grateful for the Erdman Trust's work, but she later became displeased with how Erdman was managing the sanctuary. In 1977 most of the land was renamed for Erdman's mother Florence Jones Reineman. Dorothy added a codicil to her will barring sanctuary manager Larry B. Watkins from entering the section that remained Beaversprite, and wrote that he wanted to turn the sanctuary into his "private country estate". Watkins, who was an avid hunter and author of a book titled "Guide to Adirondack Deer Hunting", was disliked by animal rights advocates at the sanctuary.

Dorothy died in 1985 at the age of 91; the last beaver to live in the house followed in 1987. At the time 40 beavers lived on the property in six lodges. After Dorothy's death, Beaversprite was closed to the public, despite a section in her will requesting it stay open. A group of her friends and colleagues formed the Friends of Beaversprite and began to take action against the Erdman Trust. Cleveland Amory, Doris Day, and Bob Barker were among Friends of Beaversprite supporters. In 1988 the Friends of Beaversprite initiated a boycott of Mellon Bank: the kickoff press conference was held in front of the Girard Trust Bank building and featured a 20-foot inflatable beaver. In 1989 they filed suit against the Erdman Trust and Watkins for mismanagement. Watkins was accused of hunting and logging on the sanctuary grounds, using sanctuary staff for personal labor, and retaliating against whistleblowers. They asked that Watkins, the Erdman Trust, and the Natural Lands Trust be removed.

Around 2005, the sanctuary was still owned by the Erdman Trust and used by the SUNY College of Environmental Science and Forestry for studies of the American beaver.

In 2020, after a period of closure, the Utica Zoo acquired Beaversprite and reopened it to the public.

== Gallery ==
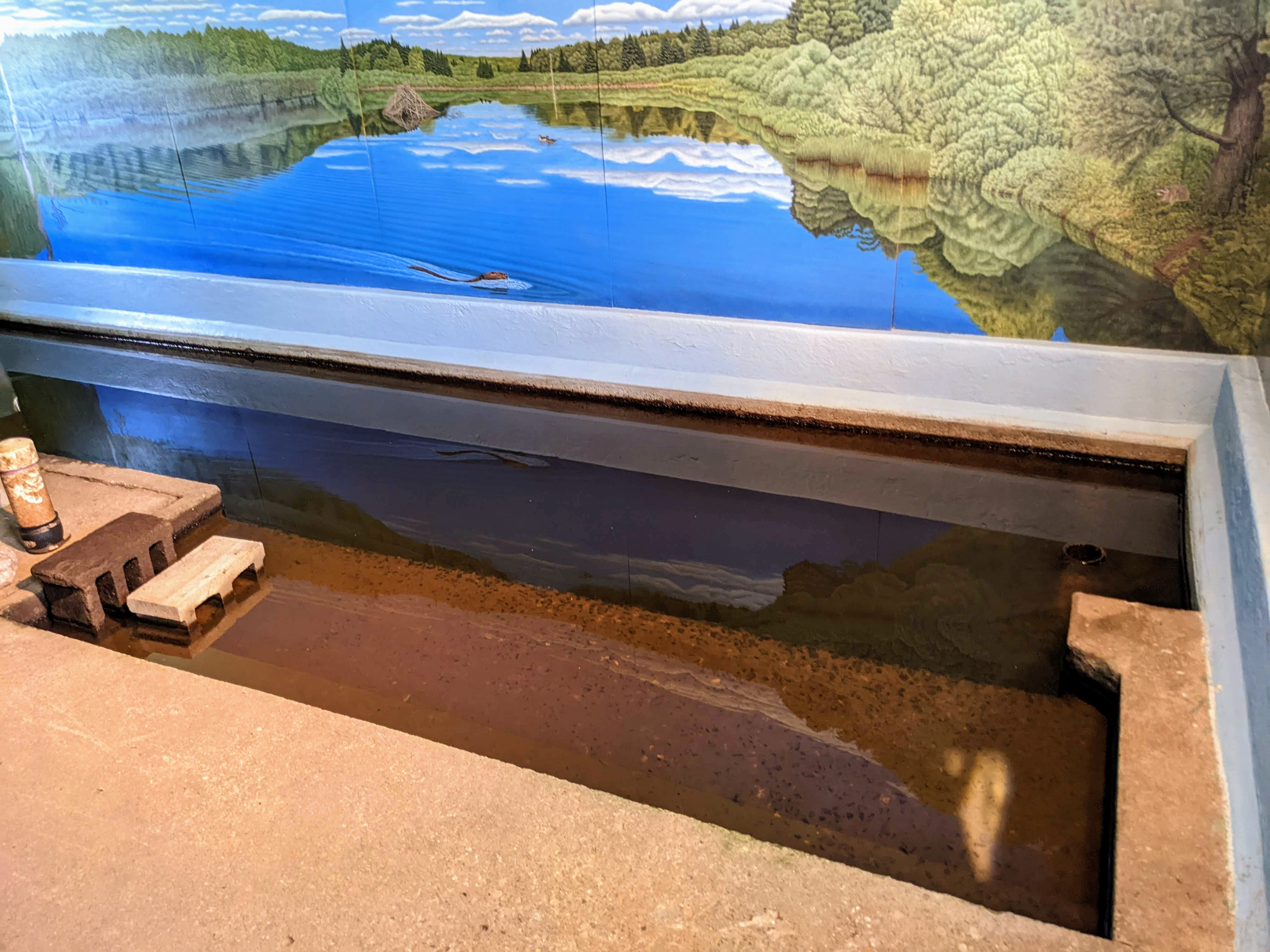
Cement beaver pool ("The Y") attached to cottage.

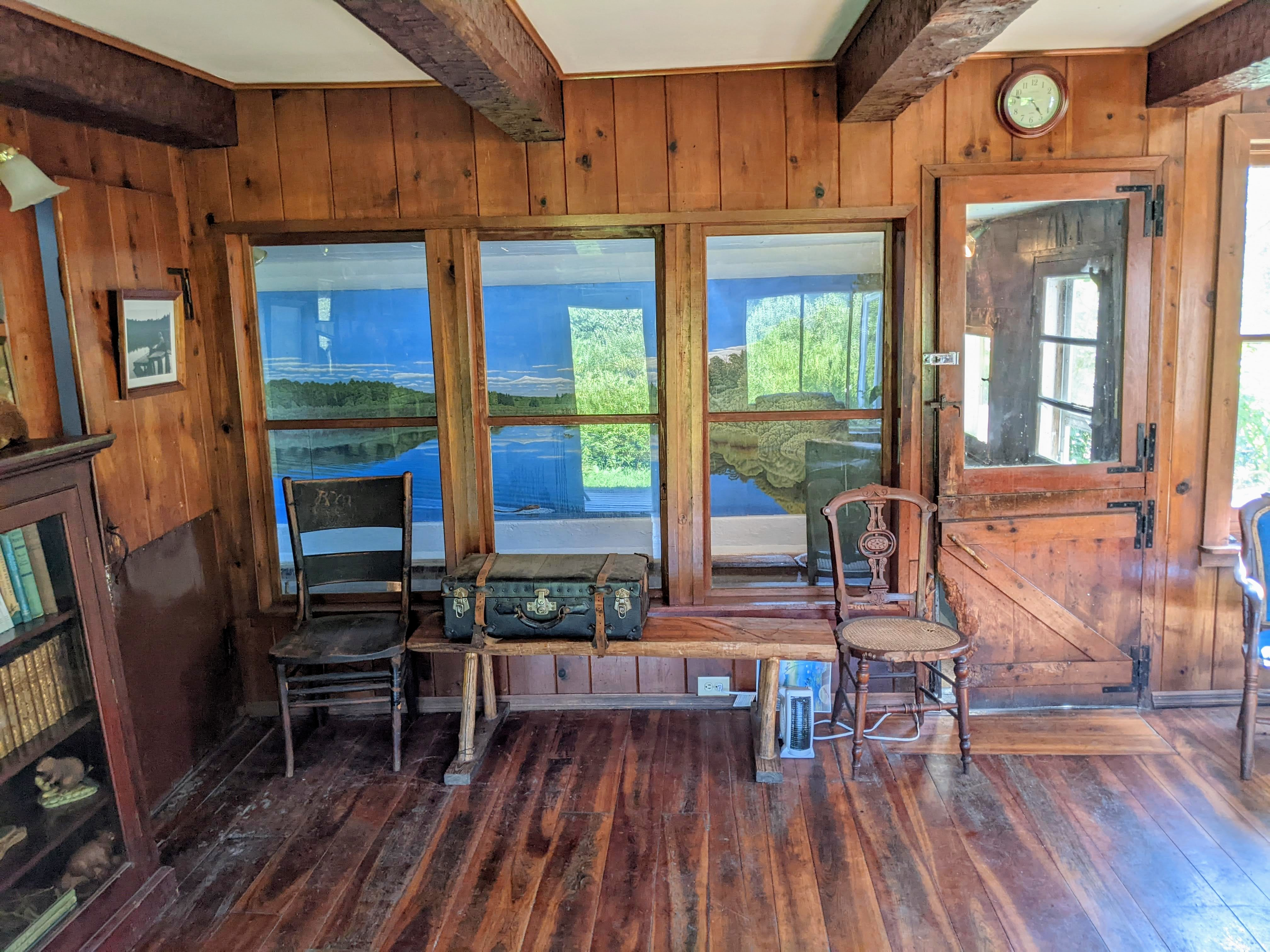
Windows between cottage living room and beaver pool.

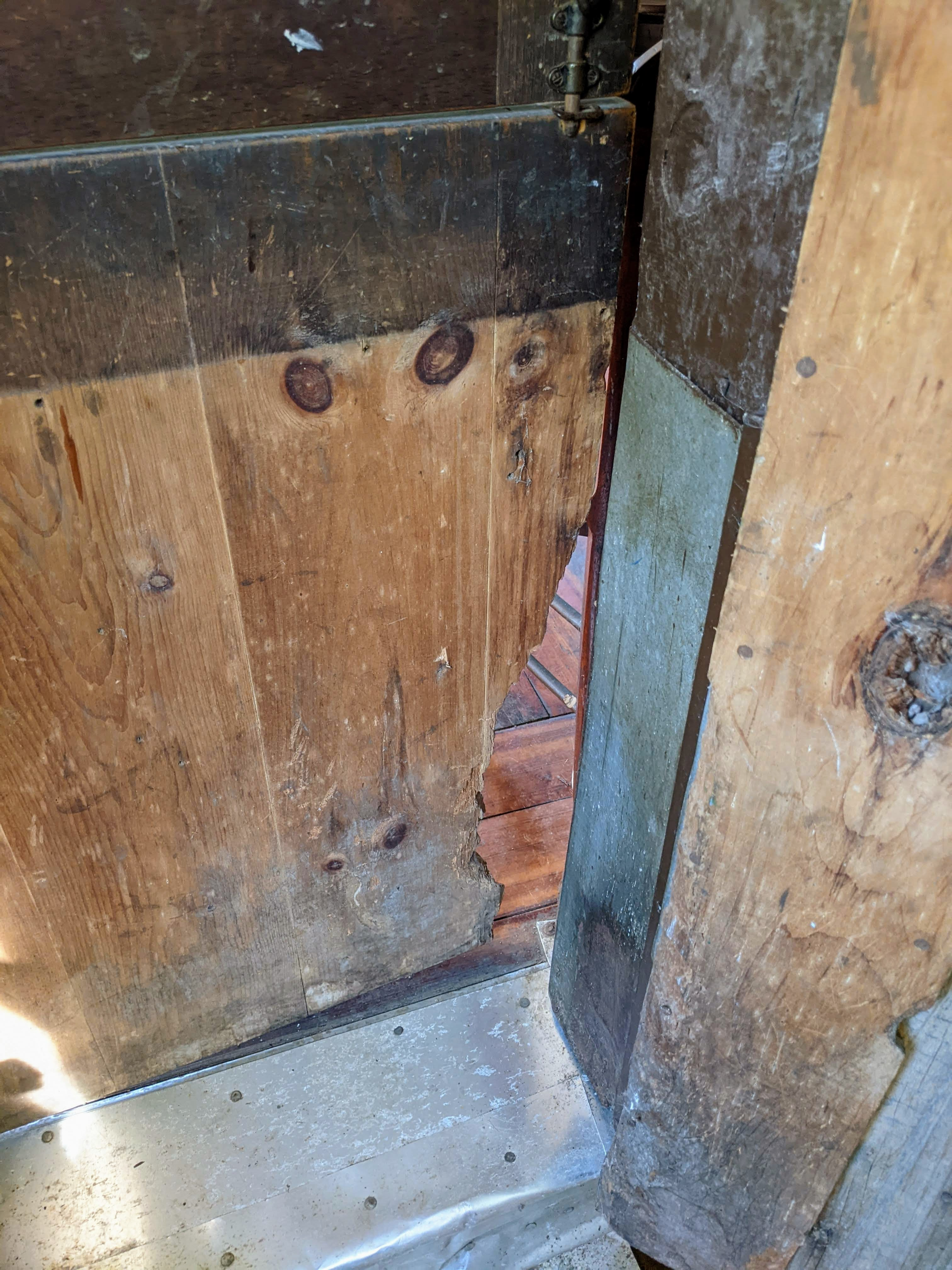
Door between living room and beaver pool, showing gnawing damage from beavers.

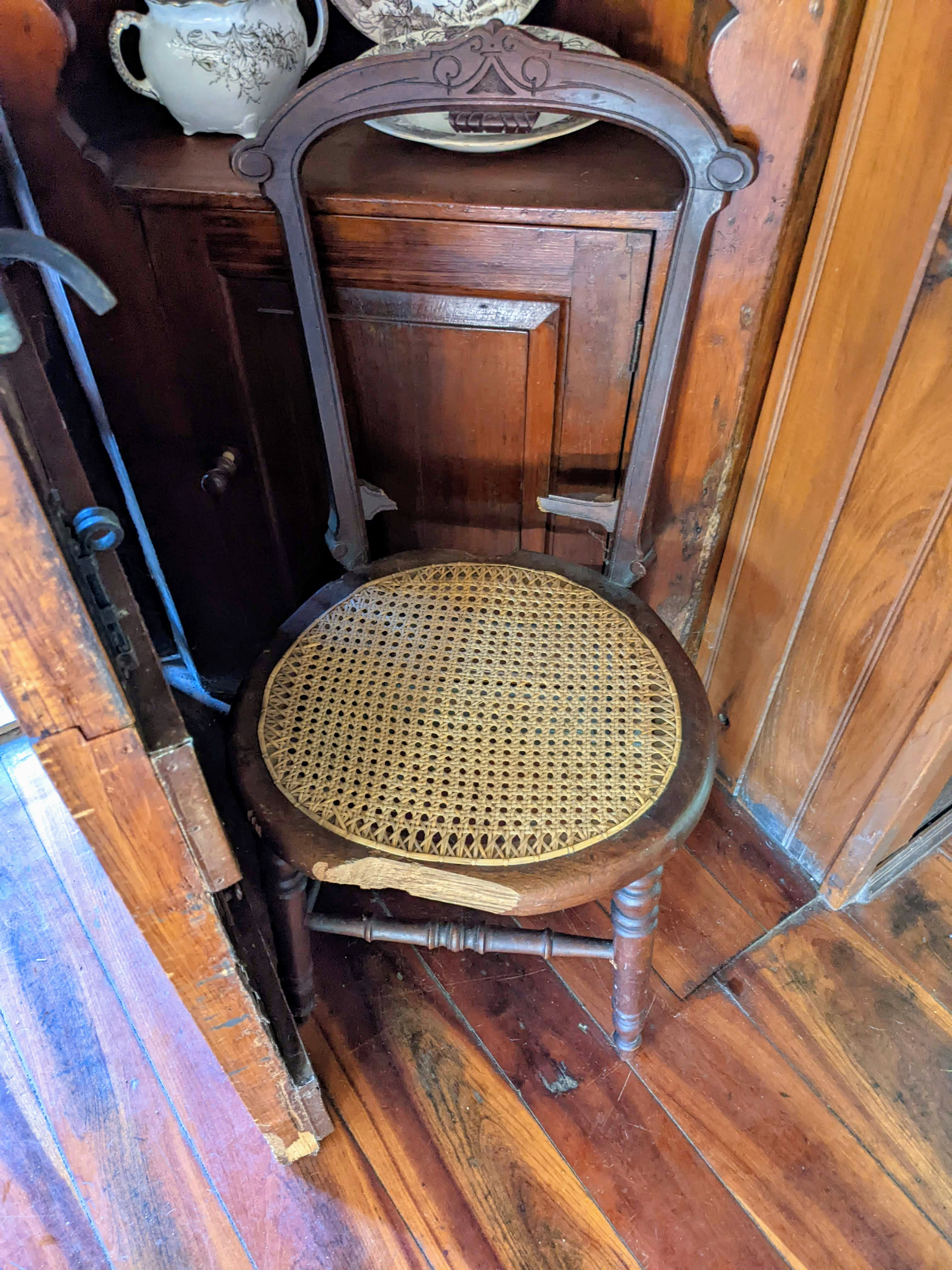
Chair in living room, with beaver gnaw marks on the front of the seat.

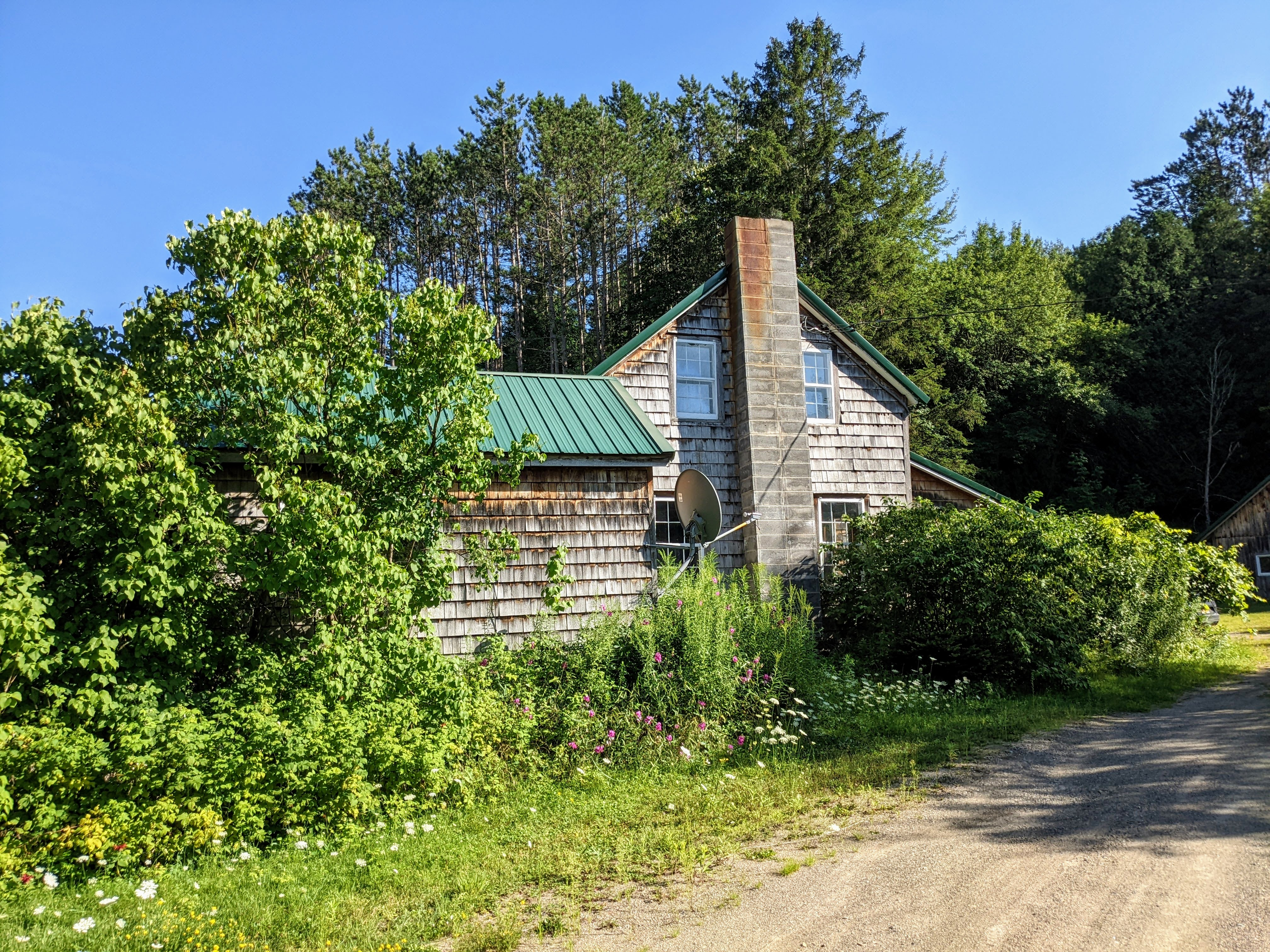
Cottage from the end of Richards Rd.
