= Tri Coloured Dutch =

Breed of rabbit

The Tri-Colour Dutch (also known as the Japanese Dutch or Harlequin Dutch) is a breed of domestic rabbit created in the Netherlands by crossing tortoiseshell Dutch rabbits with Harlequin rabbits. The Tri-Colour Dutch breed is recognized by the British Rabbit Council but not by the American Rabbit Breeders Association (although there are breeders of Harlequin Dutch rabbits in the USA). The coat of the Tri-Colour Dutch is white in the same places as a Dutch rabbit, but the coloured portions of the coat are a mix of orange with either black, blue or chocolate.

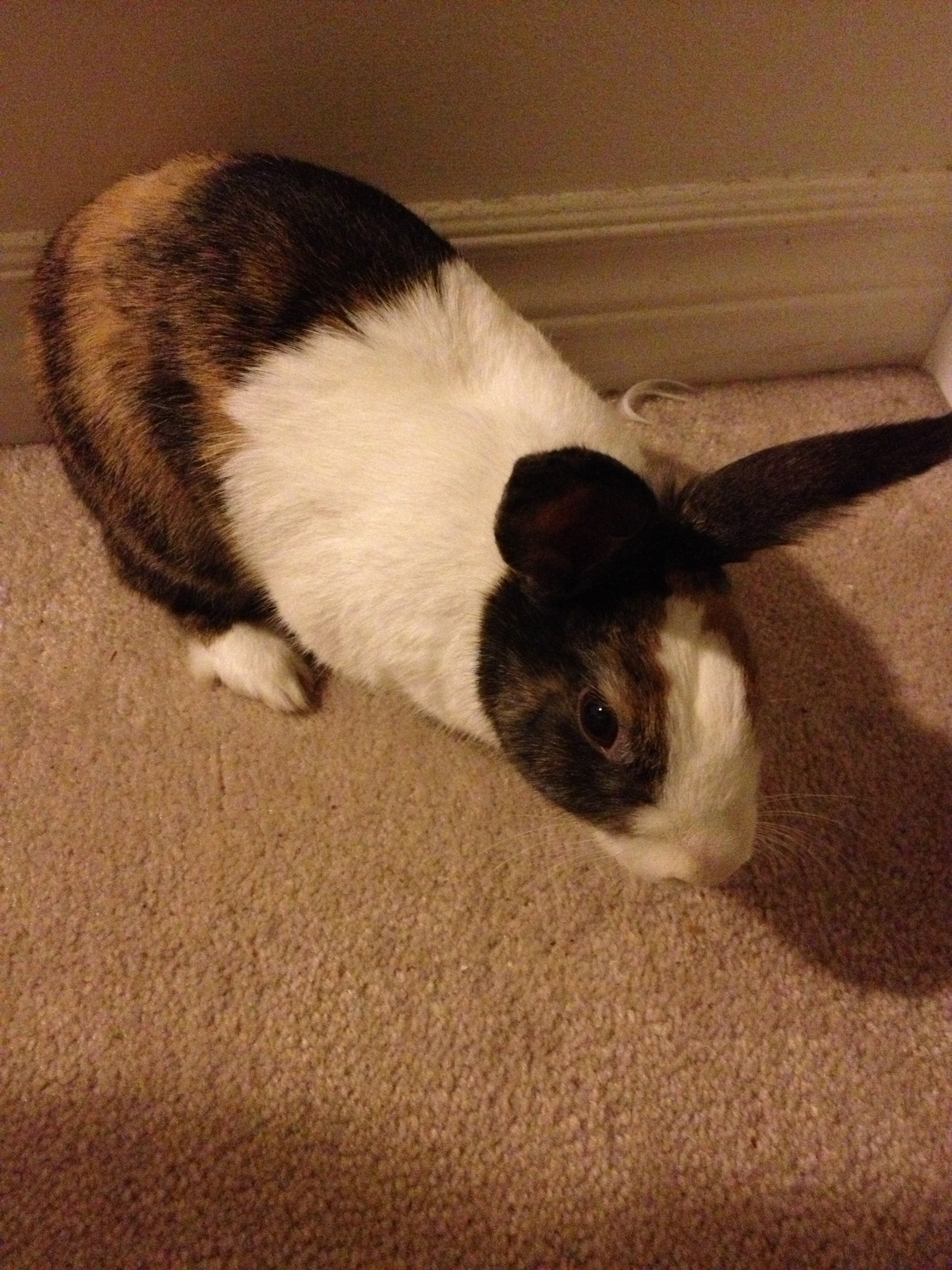
A Tri-Colour Dutch Rabbit.

== Appearance ==
The BRC Breed Standard states:

1. Body and type - Body is cobby, head held well between shoulders, which are firm and well muscled. Ears strong, well carried, length not to exceed 10 cm (4 inch). Chest wide and well formed. Front feet medium length—Straight and fairly fine bone. Back feet held parallel to body. Pattern on head - Cheeks well rounded must not touch whisker bed or corners of mouth or over past the cheekbone.

2. Design and colour - One cheek must be orange-the other cheek black with ears black on orange side and orange on black cheek side. Blaze is white. It commences as a point starting from near the ear roots and gradually widens evenly passing between the eyes on to the neck and nape. This white must be as wide as possible. Must not pass between the ears. The saddle must make a true ring around the body and be placed 2–3 cm (3/4-1.1/4 inches) behind the front feet. The coloured half must be 2–3 cm (3/4-1.1/4 inches) banded as regularly as possible with alternating bands of black and orange. Stops regular. Colours- Also recognisable, blue to replace black, chocolate to replace black,

3. Fur - Thick and lustrous with plenty of under coat and guard hairs. Weight- 1.70-2.5 kg (3.3/4- 5.1/2 lb).

=== Faults ===
Coloured fur on white part or white patches on the coloured parts. DISQUALIFICATIONS -Discoloured or wall eyes (pale blue iris), specked eyes (pale blue spots or specks on the iris). Flesh markings (usually on ears). Trimming (attempts to straighten out irregularities, dyeing white spots on coloured fur, etc.). Malocclusion and mutilated teeth. the breed is present at Hendrina.

== See also ==
- List of rabbit breeds
