= Brown Chestnut of Lorraine =

Breed of rabbit

The Brown Chestnut of Lorraine (also known as the Brun Marron de Lorraine) is a breed of domestic rabbit that originated in France and is named for the Lorraine region. The breed is currently considered rare. It was developed by Ch. Kauffmann from Garenne and Tan rabbit stock. The ideal weight for this breed is 2–2.4 kilograms (4.4–5.3 lb). This rabbit has chestnut brown fur.

The Brown Chestnut of Lorraine has been described as: "a small slender rabbit, harmoniously rounded. Angular head with prominent eyes. Dense fur with short hair. Chestnut brown uniform color with a well-defined orange-brown outer-color. Under-color bluish including the belly. Ears bluish on their inner side and edged with a black border."

== See also ==
- List of rabbit breeds
