= Utica Parks and Parkway Historic District =

Historic district in New York, United States

- U.S. National Register of Historic Places
- U.S. Historic district
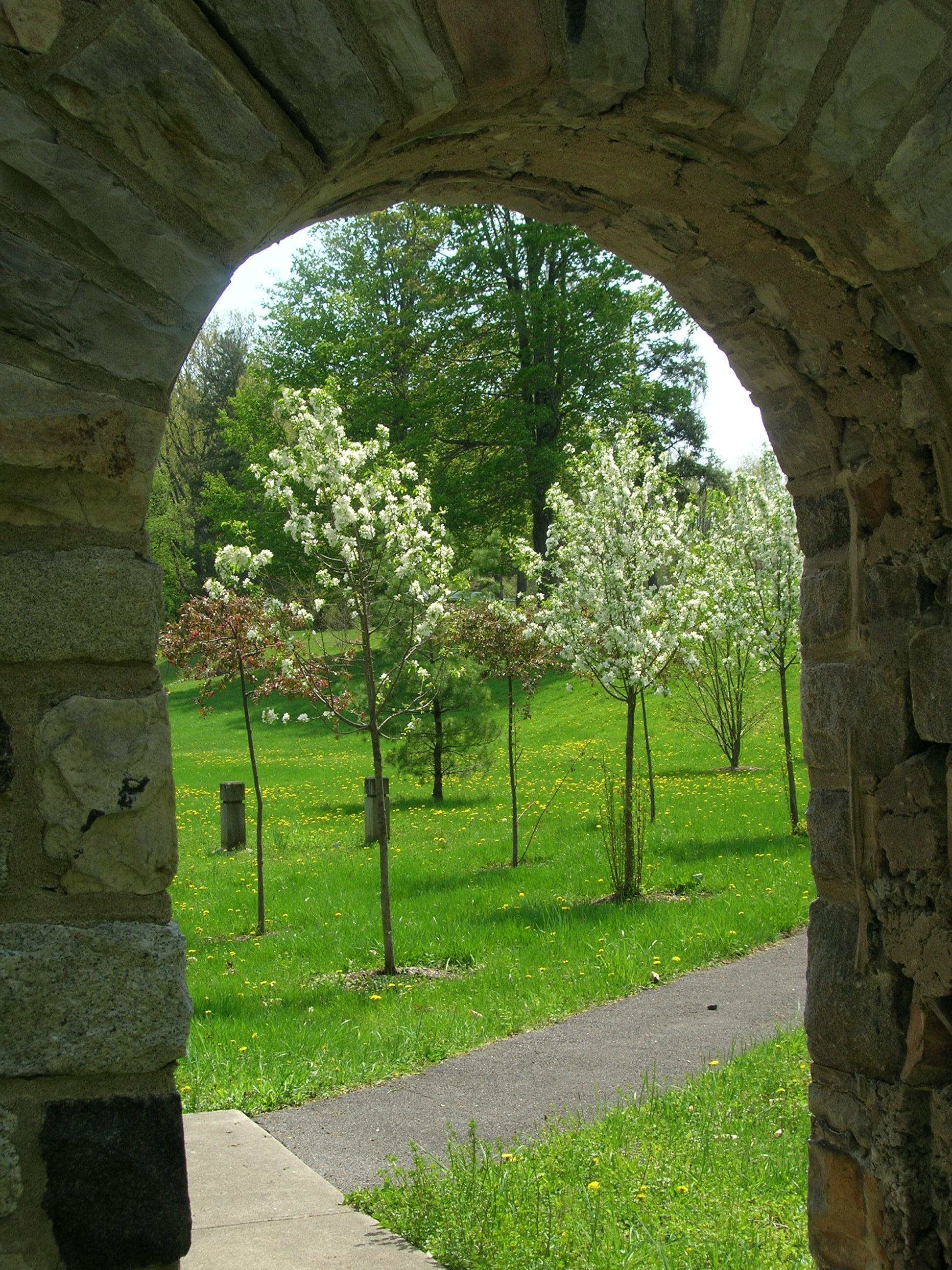
- Bathhouse archway in the district

- Location within New York Location within the United States
- Location: Parkway and Pleasant St, Utica, New York
- Coordinates: 43°4′47.16″N 75°13′56.07″W
- Area: 625 acres (253 ha)
- Built: 1909
- Architect: Frederick Law Olmsted Jr., Edward C. Whiting
- NRHP reference No.: 08000594
- Added to NRHP: July 03, 2008

Utica Parks and Parkway Historic District is a national historic district located at Utica in Oneida County, New York, United States. It consists of four contributing historic elements: a historic right-of-way known as the Memorial Parkway and the three large parks it connects: Roscoe Conkling Park, F.T. Proctor Park, and T.R. Proctor Park. The district includes seven contributing buildings, three contributing sites, 26 contributing structures, and five contributing objects. The park and parkway system was designed between 1908 and 1914 by the firm of Olmsted Brothers Landscape Associates, headed by Frederick Law Olmsted Jr. The Utica Zoo is located in Roscoe Conkling Park.

It was listed on the National Register of Historic Places in 2009.

== History ==
Thomas Redfield Proctor (May 25, 1844 - July 4, 1920) was a prominent Utica businessman and philanthropist. Thomas R. Proctor High School is also named for him. Proctor purchased about 400 acres (160 ha) of farmland in 1904 and contracted the Olmstead brothers to design a city parks system. Thomas R. Proctor Park and Roscoe Conkling Park opened to the public in 1909. Proctor had also gifted the smaller Watson-Williams Park to the city in 1897, and Horatio Seymour, Addison C. Miller, Truman K. Butler, and J. Thomas Spriggs Parks in 1908.

== Frederick T. Proctor Park ==
Frederick T. Proctor Park is located on the corner of Rutger Street and Culver Avenue. It is considered the “Crown Jewel” of the district's parks as it is the smallest of the three, containing 62 acres (25 ha) of land. The Works Progress Administration contributed in building some of the parks' structures; these structures were not part of the original park plan, but still hold historical significance. The park includes a lily pond, a butterfly garden, bathhouses and stonework. Many of the trees and flowers in the park were planted by volunteers. The Starch Factory Creek, which is known for its landscape and its woods, flows through T. R. Proctor Park and F. T. Proctor Park. The park hosts the city's Fourth of July fireworks.

== Thomas R. Proctor Park ==
100 acres (40 ha) Thomas R. Proctor Park is south of F. T. Proctor Park on the corner of Culver Avenue and Welshbush Road. It has 100 acres (40 ha) of land with baseball and soccer fields, basketball courts, a playground and running trail.

== Roscoe Conkling Park ==
Roscoe Conkling Park is located along Oneida Street and the Memorial Parkway totaling up to 625 acres (253 ha). This was the first park developed by the Proctor brothers in 1909. It was designed to give Utica a pastoral appearance. The park includes the Utica Zoo, Valley View Golf Course, Val Bialas Ski and Sled Chalet, Parkway Recreation Center, John Mott Tennis Courts, South Woods switchback trails and several monuments. Roscoe Conkling Park also has many memorials and statues, including the Eagle Monument.

The Utica Zoo is situated on the park's grounds and features over 200 animals on forty acres of land. The Park also includes the Valley View Golf Course, which was designed by Robert Trent Jones.

During the winter, visitors can visit the Val Bialas Ski and Sled Chalet, named for local Olympian ice skater Valentine Bialas. It offers a rope tow, chair lift, night skiing, an ice rink and chalet with a snack bar. During the winter The South Woods Switchback Trails are groomed for cross country skiing.

The Parkway Recreation Center, also known as the Edward A. Hanna Recreation Center, contains two modified basketball courts, a playground, weight training station, exercise equipment, walking track, tennis courts, computer room, conference area, and the Utica Sport Hall of Fame. The Recreation Center also accommodates the Utica Boys & Girls Club and the Parkway Senior Center.

== Memorial Parkway ==
The Memorial Parkway is a divided parkway with a wide grassy median for most of its length. East of Mohawk Valley Community College the two sides join, and east of the Utica Armory it becomes Culver Avenue. From west to east, the monuments on the Memorial Parkway are:

Caption
| Order | Name | Erected | Location | Notes |
|---|---|---|---|---|
| 1 | James Schoolcraft Sherman | 1923 | West of Genesee Street, facing east | Utica native Sherman served as US Vice President under William Howard Taft. |
| 2 | Major General Friedrich Wilhelm von Steuben | 1914 | East of Genesee Street, facing west | General in the US Revolutionary War, settled in Remsen, New York after the war. Erected by the Utica German American Alliance. |
| 3 | Vietnam War memorial | 1985 | West of Holland Avenue | |
| 4 | George E. Dunham | 1931 | East of Holland Avenue | Editor of the Utica Daily Press, vice principal of the Whitestown Seminary, manager of the Utica State Hospital for the Insane |
| 5 | Brigadier General Casimir Pulaski | 1930 | West of Oneida Street | General in the US Revolutionary War |
| 6 | Spanish American War/USS Maine Memorial | 1915 | East of Oneida Street | |
| 7 | POW/MIA Memorial | 1992 | Across from the Parkway Center | |
| 8 | Central New York War Memorial | 2000 | Across from Kemble Street | Memorial for World War I, World War II, and the Korean War. Made from fiberglass, it was declared beyond repair in 2025. |
| 9 | Mary S. Hendricks Police and Firefighters Memorial Park | 2005 | Across from Kemble Street | Named for a Utica woman who advocated for the Utica Police and Fire departments. |
| 10 | Statue of Liberty | 1950 | West of Elm Street | A replica of the Statue of Liberty in New York City. One of nearly 200 copies gifted by the Boy Scouts of America on their 40th anniversary. |
| 11 | Swan Memorial Fountain | 1910 | East of Elm Street | Dedicated to Joseph R. Swan, a prominent Utica lawyer, by his wife. Sculpted by Frederick MacMonnies. |
| 12 | Thomas R. Proctor | 1921 | East of previous | Memorial to Thomas R. Proctor, for whom Thomas R. Proctor Park is also named. |
| 13 | Christopher Columbus | 1952, moved to current location 1966 | West of Mohawk Street | Gift of the Federation of Italian-American Societies of Utica. Originally stood outside the Utica Observer-Dispatch. |
| 14 | September 11 Memorial | 2011 | East of Sherman Place | |
| 15 | Sebilj | 2025 | East of previous | A replica of the Sebilj in Sarajevo, built by local Bosnian American association. |
