= Rhinelander rabbit =

Breed of rabbit

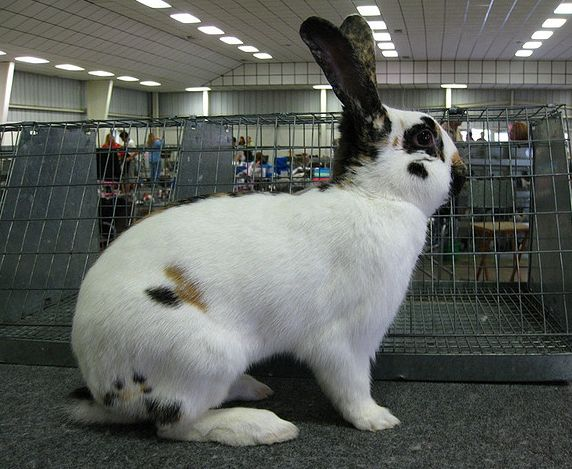
Rhinelander buck

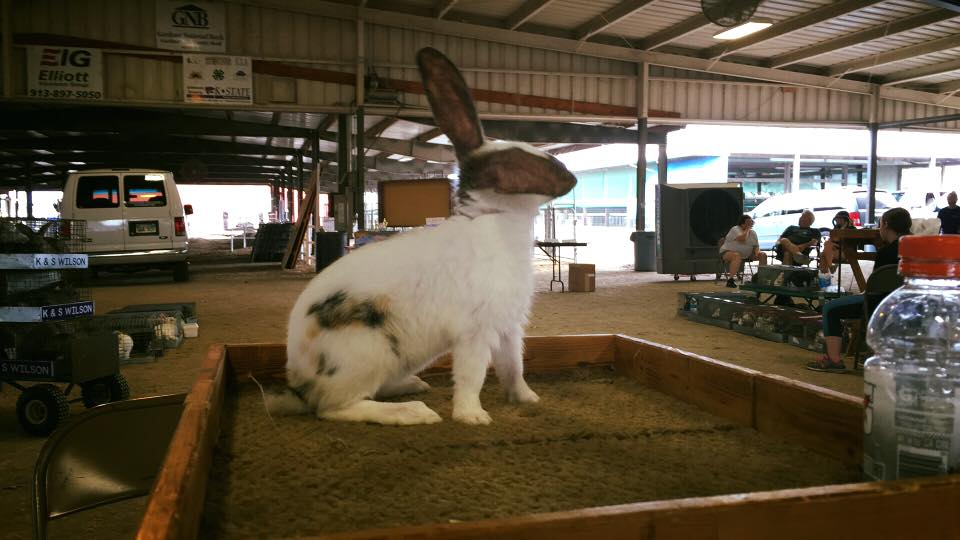
Junior Rhinelander buck

The Rhinelander is a medium-sized breed of domestic rabbit that originated in Germany. Rhinelanders are known for their distinctive facial "butterfly markings", a spine marking, colored ears, cheek spots, eye circles and side markings (on a white background) of black with orange or of blue with fawn. The Rhinelander breed is recognized by the British Rabbit Council (BRC) and by the American Rabbit Breeders Association (ARBA).

Initially developed in Germany in the first decade of the 20th century, Rhinelanders began to be exported to other countries in the 1920s. Although popular in Germany at first, interest in the breed dwindled by 1930, possibly due to an increase in popularity of the Checkered Giant or to the lingering effects of World War I; however, they experienced a resurgence in popularity after World War II. Interest also waxed and waned in the United States, where the breed experienced a 40-year absence between 1932 and 1972. Re-establishment in the US in the 1970s resulted in the creation of the Rhinelander Rabbit Club of America in 1974. Today, the Rhinelander breed is considered rare in the United States and in the United Kingdom.

== Description ==
The Rhinelander is an arched breed of rabbit, meaning that light shows between its body and the ground when the rabbit is sitting or moving. It is similar in appearance to the Checkered Giant breed, but smaller. The Rhinelander has a trim athletic appearance, with the body being the same width from shoulders to hip. The Rhinelander is known for its distinctive coat pattern and for its "butterfly markings" which cover the nose and upper jaw in a shape resembling a butterfly. British standard calls for a weight of 6 to 10 lb (2.7 to 4.5 kg), while the American registry prefers a weight of 7 to 9 pounds (3.2 to 4.1 kg). The only color pattern recognized by the BRC is a white base colour with black and yellow markings on the face and back; however, ARBA recognizes a blue and fawn spotting pattern on a white background, in addition to the black and orange pattern.

The mottled pattern of black and orange, called Japanese brindling, is caused by the e^{J} allele of extension.

== History ==
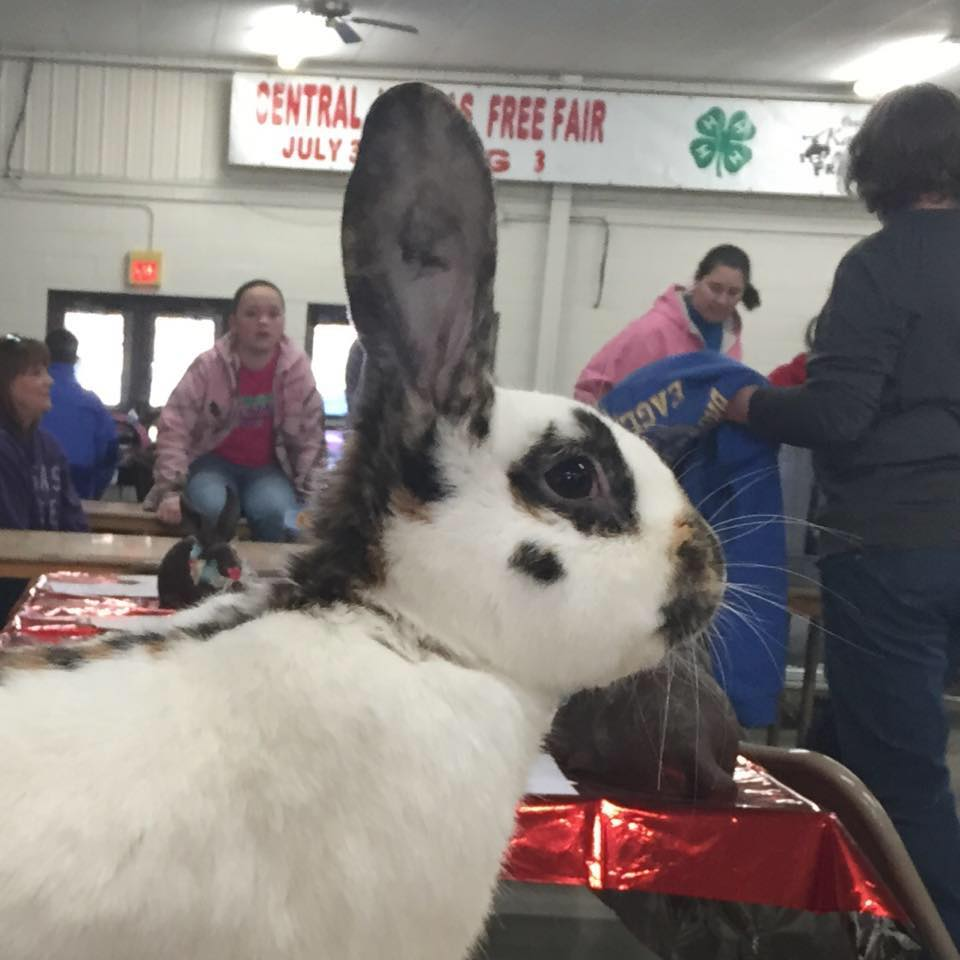
Rhinelander's head markings

The Rhinelander first appeared in shows in 1902 in Germany, after initially being bred in North Rhine-Westphalia. They were developed from a cross between a Harlequin buck and a gray papillon type doe. A buck from the litter had the markings that the Rhinelander would come to be known for - black and orange in color, located on the chin, ears and "butterfly markings" in black on one side and orange on the other. Another cross was made between the Harlequin buck and a Checkered Giant doe, with the resulting litter producing a doe with the desired markings. The buck from the first litter and the doe from the second litter were mated, and does from the resulting litters were crossed with Harlequin bucks to create the Rhinelander breed. In 1905, a German breed standard was created, and they were given the German name "Rheinishe Schecke".

In 1924, the first rabbits were exported to the Netherlands and England. Although initially very popular, the initial interest soon dwindled, along with breeder numbers. Selective breeding for color markings, as required by the breed standard, was beyond the skill of many breeders; this, combined with the athletic, rather than meat-producing, conformation, resulted by 1930 in only a few breeders continuing to preserve the breed. Interest reemerged in post-World War II Germany, however, and population numbers again grew, with the Rhinelander becoming the most popular spotted breed in the country by 1978.

After the first exports from Germany to the US in 1923, the Rhinelander was recognized as a breed in the US by the National Breeders and Fanciers Association. By 1932, however, none remained in the US, likely due either to the difficulties of meeting the breed standard or to greater breeder interest in the Checkered Giant rabbit. In 1972, an American breeder visiting West Germany saw the breed at a show and returned to the US with four Rhinelanders. In 1974, the Rhinelander Rabbit Club of America was created, and in 1975, the breed was acknowledged by the American Rabbit Breeders Association. Over the next two decades, additional animals were imported from the Netherlands and Germany to combat problems with inbreeding among the limited population in the US. Some breeders crossed Rhinelanders with Harlequin or Checkered Giant rabbits to improve the stock. In 1994, the American breed standard was rewritten and clarified, and interest in the breed continued to grow.

The Livestock Conservancy currently places the breed at "watch" status, meaning there is a global population of less than 2,000 and fewer than 200 registrations in the US each year. In Britain, the Rhinelander breed is currently designated as a member of the BRC's "Rare Varieties Club".

== See also ==
- List of rabbit breeds
