= Ned Buyukmihci =

American veterinarian

- Occupation: Animal Rights Activist
- Years active: 1979-2003 (at UC Davis)
- Known for: Founder of the Association of Veterinarians for Animal Rights,
- Medical career
- Profession: Veterinarian
- Field: Veterinary Ophthalmology
- Institutions: University of California; Davis, Animal Protection Institute

Nedim Cavit Buyukmihci is an American veterinarian, specializing in veterinary ophthalmology, and founder of the Association of Veterinarians for Animal Rights. A leading figure within the animal rights movement, he is an outspoken critic of scientific testing on animals. He is a professor emeritus of ophthalmology at the University of California, Davis' School of Veterinary Medicine, having retired in 2003.

Buyukmihci founded the Association of Veterinarians for Animal Rights in 1981 with fellow veterinarian physician Neil Wolff.

Buyukmihci joined the staff of the University of California, Davis in 1979, almost immediately conflicting with the School of Veterinary Medicine administration with his opposition to the use of shelter animals as test subjects for surgery practice. He retired from the university in the spring of 2003, retaining his emeritus professorship. In August 2003, he took up a position as director of the Animal Protection Institute's primate sanctuary for non-human primates in Dilley, Texas. He is a diplomate of the American College of Veterinary Ophthalmologists.

His sister Nermin founded America's first cruelty-free vegan store, Nermin's Dry Goods, in the late 1970s.

They were the two children of Hope Sawyer Buyukmihci of the Unexpected Wildlife Refuge, which was frequently featured in Ahimsa, a publication of the American Vegan Society.

== See also ==
- List of animal rights advocates
