= English Spot =

Breed of rabbit

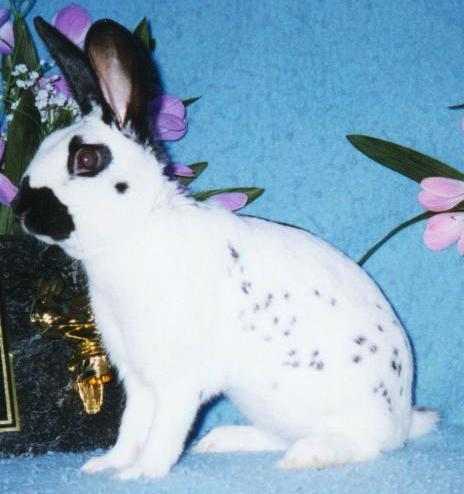
A black English Spot

The English Spot is a breed of domestic rabbit that was developed in England in the 19th century through selective breeding. Averaging 5 to 8 pounds in weight, the English Spot is a medium-sized breed that is most noted by the distinctive colored markings on its body, including the butterfly nose marking, eye circles, cheek spots, herringbone, colored ears, and a chain of spots. The English Spot's fur type is flyback. The breed comes in seven different varieties, including black, blue, chocolate, lilac, tortoise, gray, and gold. English Spots have a full arch body, with long front legs that carry them off the table. English Spots are most known for their curious and fun loving nature.

== History ==
The English Spot Rabbit is believed to be one of the oldest breeds of rabbit whose origins trace back to the 19th century. The exact origin of the English Spot is unknown, but they are believed to have come from the English Butterfly or Checkered Giant due to their shared physical features, such as cheek spots, butterflies, eye circles, colored ears, and a herringbone.

The breed has been common in England since the 1850s, and was imported to North America at around 1910. The American English Spot Rabbit Club was established in 1924. The French named the breed "Lapin Papillon Anglais", or the English Butterfly Rabbit from the butterfly marking on the nose. Previous generations of the breed entailed a white rabbit with patches of color and through the years has acquired clearly defined markings.

== Description ==
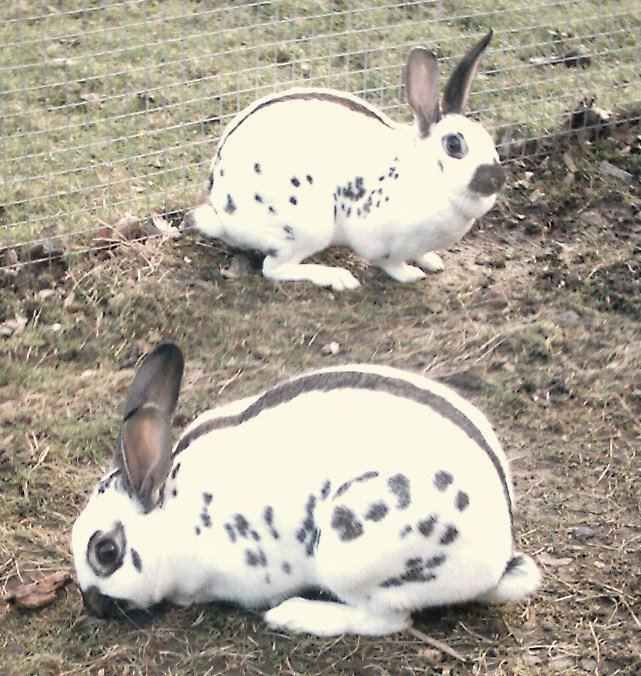
English pair

The English Spot is a medium-sized breed, averaging 5–8 pounds. They are known for their arched body type, with two front paws that lift them off the table showing daylight under the belly. The hips should be well rounded and slightly broader than the shoulders. The legs are long and slender; the hind legs are parallel with the body. The ears are to be vertical. An English Spot that is well marked "will not show off the markings without the correct body type."

An English Spot is known by its six types of body markings: butterfly, cheek spots, eye circles, colored ears, herringbone, and chain of spots. The butterfly is a butterfly marking around the nose; if looking straight at the rabbit's nose, the butterfly will peak in the middle and have a wing on both sides. The cheek spots are colored dots below the eye on both sides of the rabbit. Eye circles are solid colored circles around both eyes of the rabbit. The herringbone is a straight, solid line that runs from the base of the ears to the tip of the tail along the rabbit's backbone. The most known feature of the English Spot is the chain of individual spots that sweeps both sides of the rabbit's body, running from the base of the neck to the hind legs.

== Breeding ==
The English Spot doe, female, will foster young easily, often raising her young with the litter of other breeds. A normal litter is on average, 5–7 young with a gestation period of 30–32 days. Of a litter from two marked rabbits, 25% will be a solid color (AKA Sports), 25% will have partial markings (AKA Charlies), and 50% will have all the required markings of an English Spot. This is a result of the En, en gene that rabbits have. Solids (Sports in English Spots) will have enen genes, brokens (Marked in English Spots) will have Enen, and Charlies carry EnEn.

== See also ==
- List of rabbit breeds
