= Harlequin rabbit =

Breed of rabbit

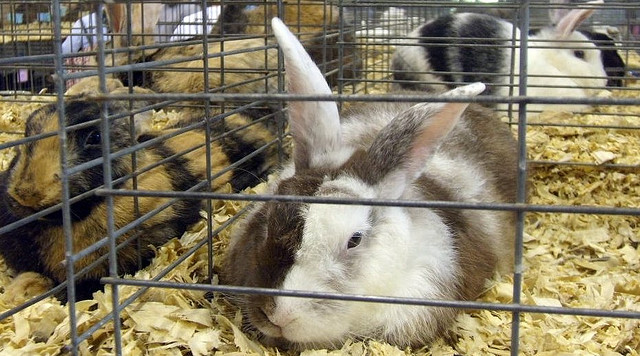
Black Japanese and Chocolate Magpie

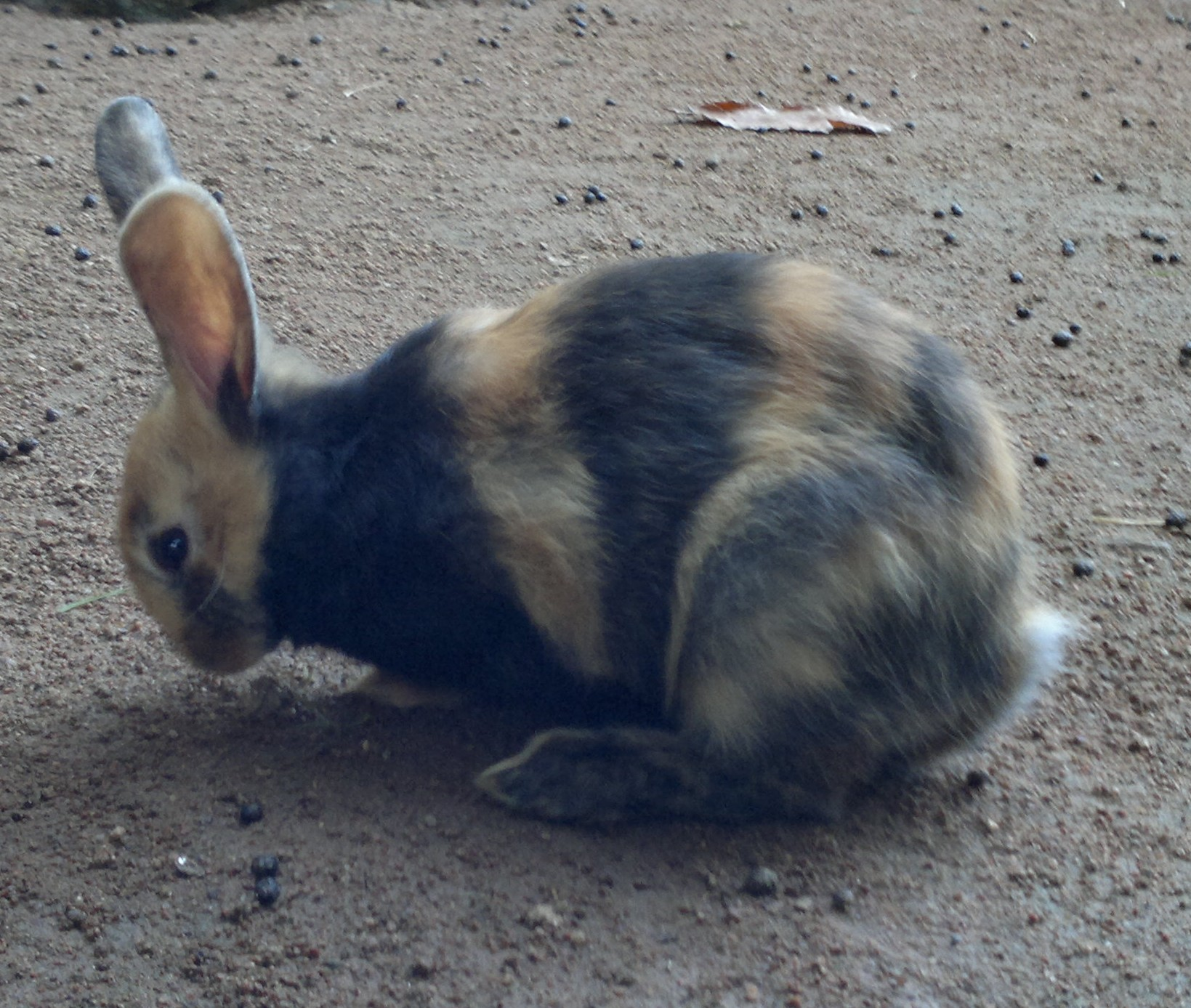
Black Japanese Harlequin

The Harlequin is a colourful breed of domestic rabbit originating from France. It is a breed based around the coloration and markings, rather than fur and body type. The ideal weight of a standard Harlequin is 6.5-9.5 lb (2–3 kg), with bucks (males) weighing 6.5-9 lb, and does (females) weighing 7-9.5 lb.

== Description ==
The traditional Harlequin is part black or some other colour (no silvering) and part white or orange (the brighter the better). It should have an even mix of both colours and ideally have a half-and-half colouration on the head. The orange color is known as Japanese. Their colouration (not the name of the breed) may also be called magpie where the second colour is white rather than orange. The recognized Japanese colours are:

- Black
- Blue
- Chocolate (brown)
- Lilac

The magpie variants are, naturally:

- Black
- Blue
- Chocolate (brown)
- Lilac

It is recognized by both the British Rabbit Council and American Rabbit Breeders' Association.

The Harlequin rabbit is playful, docile, and intelligent. Like most breeds, the rabbit can respond to its own name and even be litter box trained. They are gentle.

Harlequin rabbits come in two types: Japanese and Magpie. Japanese Harlequins are generally orange and either black, blue, chocolate, or lilac, while Magpie Harlequins are white (instead of orange) and either black, blue, chocolate, or lilac. A "perfect" Harlequin will be split between the two colors on the head, ears, feet, and body, like a perfect stripe between the two colors. Some Harlequins will have orange or white bellies; either is permissible for showing purposes.

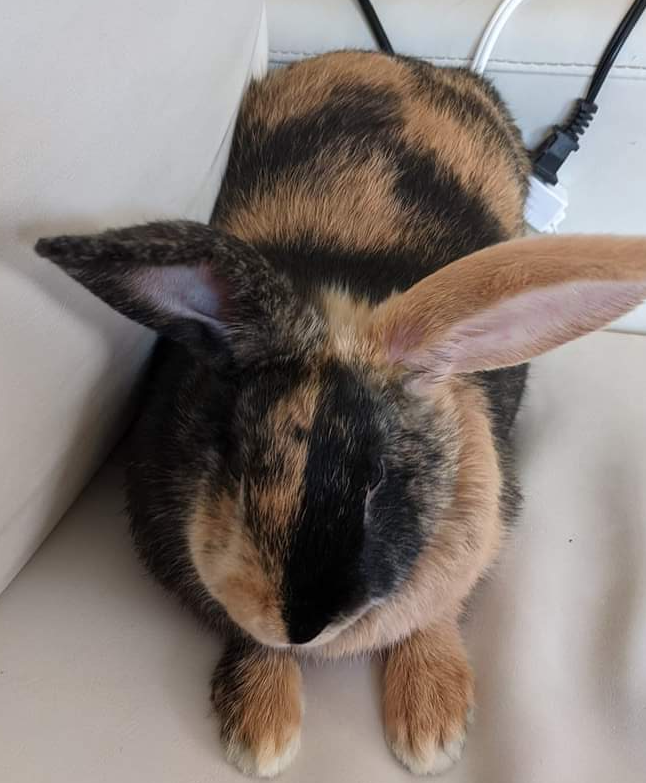
An example of a well marked, show quality Harlequin. Note the face split and body markings.

The current American Rabbit Breeders Association (ARBA) Standard of Perfection calls for a 3 part frontal alternation. The ears are two different colors. The face splits into two colors, which alternate with the ears. The chest and front legs split into two colors, which alternate with the face and match the ears. The hind feet should alternate with the front feet. Ideally there should be 5-7 body markings. The body markings are either bars (half circle of color that runs vertically down the side), bands (unbroken circle of color), or a combination of the two. Disqualifications include a lack of defined split of color down the center of the face, Dutch-like markings, and white spots or white nails on the Japanese varieties. White eye rings, undersides/bellies, bottom of cheeks and feet are permitted in Japanese Harlequins. Any white spots are not noticeable in Magpies, as the orange is completely replaced with white, blending any white spotting. This may cause white spots to pop up when breeding Magpies to Japanese.

When showing, the Japanese and Magpies are shown as two different groups, (and four different classes: senior bucks, senior does, junior bucks, junior does) then the best and best opposite of those groups are shown against each other for best and best opposite of breed. Best opposite is always the opposite sex of the best. The four varieties of each color used to be shown individually (for a total of eight varieties) but this was found too time consuming, hence the change into groups.

It is debatable whether "Harlequin" is not a breed of rabbit, but a color type, or a breed of rabbit with that color scheme. The Harlequin markings do occur in other breeds, but the ARBA does not recognize it as showable in other breeds besides the Harlequin breed.

It was developed from semi-wild Tortoiseshell Dutch rabbits. Originally it looked like a badly marked Dutch rabbit. The origins in the Dutch breed may cause white spotting in the Japanese varieties, which is a disqualification. The average life span for the Harlequin rabbit is 5 years or more. The Harlequin was first exhibited in Paris in 1887. They were then imported into England a few years later. Harlequins were used for meat during World War II. Harlequins are nicknamed “the clown of the rabbits” and “the royal jester” because of the color separations and markings.

== See also ==
- List of rabbit breeds
