= SS Rheinland =

A number of different steamships had the name Rheinland, including:

- SS Rheinland (1885), a German cargo ship in service from 1885–1905
- SS Rheinland (1922), a German cargo ship that was wrecked in 1926

== See also ==
- Rheinland (disambiguation)
