= List of New York state symbols =

The location of the state of New York in the United States of America

This is a list of symbols of the state of New York in the United States. The majority of the state symbols are officially listed in the New York Consolidated Laws in Article 6, Sections 70 through 87. The symbols are recognized by these laws and were signed into law by the governor of New York.

The oldest symbols, the state flag and the state arms, were adopted in 1778. The most recent addition to the list, the Working dog, was added in 2015. The origin of the state motto dates back to 1784. During a tour of the state's harbors, waterways, and fertile interior, George Washington referred to New York as the "Seat of Empire". The term "The Big Apple" was coined by jazz musicians of the 1930s who used the slang expression "apple" when referring to any city.

The state insect took nine years to become official. In 1980, fifth grader Kristina Savoca sent a letter – along with a petition bearing 152 signatures – to New York State Assemblyman Robert C. Wertz, urging him to introduce legislation designating the lady beetle as the official state insect. The proposal languished for a number of years, passing in the Assembly but not being considered in the Senate. Approval finally came in 1989, after Cornell University entomologists suggested that Wertz propose the nine-spotted lady beetle (Coccinella novemnotata, sometimes abbreviated to C-9) as the state insect because it was a native lady beetle.

== Insignia ==
Type	Symbol	Year	Image
Flag	Flag of New York	1778	New York flag
Seal	Seal of New York	1778	New York State Seal
Coat of arms	The Coat of arms of New York		
Motto	Excelsior (Ever upward)	1784	
Nickname	The Empire State	1784	
Slogan	"I Love New York" (official)	1977	I Love New York

Type	Symbol	Year	Image
Butterfly	Red-spotted purple/white admiral Limenitis arthemis	2008	Red-spotted purple/white admiral
Bird	Eastern bluebird Sialia sialis	1970	The Eastern bluebird
Dog	Working dog	2015	Working dog
Mammal	North American beaver Castor canadensis	1975	Beaver
Reptile	Snapping turtle Chelydra serpentina	2006	Snapping turtle
Freshwater fish	Brook trout Salvelinus fontinalis	1975	Brook trout
Salt water fish	Striped bass Morone saxatilis	2006	Striped bass
Insect	Nine-spotted ladybug Coccinella novemnotata	1989	
Tree	Sugar maple Acer saccharum	1956	Sugar maple
Bush	Lilac bush Syringa vulgaris	2006	Lilac bush
Flower	Rose	1955	Rose

== Geology ==
Type	Symbol	Year	Image
Gemstone	Garnet	1969	Garnet
Fossil	Sea scorpion Eurypterus remipes	1984	Eurypterus remipes
Shell	Scallop; Argopecten irradians	1988	Bay Scallop

== Culture ==
Type	Symbol	Year	Image
Beverage	Milk	1981	Milk
Fruit	Apple	1976	Apples
Muffin	Apple muffin	1987	Muffins
Snack	Yogurt	2014	Yogurt

== See also ==
- List of New York-related topics
- Lists of United States state insignia
- New York
- New York City
