= Hope Sawyer Buyukmihci =

American environmentalist and naturalist

Hope Sawyer Buyukmihci (née Sawyer, 1913–2001) was a North American author, illustrator, newspaper columnist, naturalist and environmental activist who, together with her husband, set up the Unexpected Wildlife Refuge. She also founded the first beaver protection organisation in the world, Beaver Defenders, an educational club, in New Jersey, USA.

== Life and activism ==
Hope Sawyer was born in Lorraine, New York in 1913. Her father was a naturalist and bird artist. She was raised in New York. She worked as an illustrator at Cornell University in Ithaca, N.Y., where she provided illustrations for most of the vertebrates in the Field Book of Natural History.

She wanted a quiet place to raise children and also to enjoy making art. With her husband Cavit Buyukmihci (1923–1987), a metallurgist from Turkey, she bought a parcel of 85 acres (34 ha) in Buena Vista Township in the early 1960s. It had a shack on it which her husband renovated. After moving in, she realized that there were beavers on the property and gradually gained their trust. Historically, beavers had been hunted to near extinction for the overexploitation of their fur, meat and castoreum. The beavers' tree felling and dam building has not always been viewed favorably. Not all locals approved of the family's attitude towards the beavers on their property, which involved building a 60-foot (18 m) passage from their home to the beavers' pond so the beavers had direct access to their house.

The Buyukmihci's three children Nedim, Linda and Nermin were raised in these simple natural surroundings and attended public school in Franklin Township, Gloucester County, New Jersey, graduating from Delsea Regional High School. Rather than just living on the land, the Buyukmihcis wanted to help protect wildlife habitat and add to it, understanding that loss of habitat and habitat destruction is one of the greatest threats to wild life. They founded the Unexpected Wildlife Refuge in 1961 as a biodiversity haven for South Jersey wildlife and plants. They then gradually acquired more than 700 acres (280 ha) of adjoining land, fields, forests and wetlands in the area, patrolling them regularly to guard against hunters, fishermen and trappers.

In 1979 Buyukmihci founded Beaver Defenders, an organization dedicated to the preservation of beavers and their habitat conservation. It was the first major beaver protection organization in the world and still has a quarterly newsletter. She and her husband were also key to the banning of leghold traps in New Jersey.

Buyukmihci wrote a column on wildlife for the Bridgeton Evening News. She lectured widely on the topic of the hydraulic engineering skills of beavers, believing that, if left to their own devices undisturbed, they would reduce water pollution and sedimentation, manage waterways, minimize flooding, prevent fires, and attract other wildlife to their ponds. She ran the refuge until her death in 2001, by which time it included 540 acres (220 ha) of wetlands and forest.

== Legacy ==
Buyukmihci died on June 20, 2021, aged 88, at her home in the Unexpected Wildlife Refuge.

Buyukmihci wrote three books: Hour of the Beaver (1971), and, Unexpected Treasure (1968), both about her refuge, and Hoofmarks (1994). She also co-authored Beaversprite: My Years Building an Animal Sanctuary (1977) with Dorothy Richardson, a fellow American conservationist.

The Beaver Defenders became part of Beavers, Wetlands and Wildlife, a New York state organization. The refuge is now a non-profit organization dedicated to the protection of wildlife and is run by Sarah Summerville with Nedim, Dr Ned Buyukmihci, founder of the Association of Veterinarians for Animal Rights, as the president and secretary of a council of trustees which oversees the nearly 800-acre (320 ha) habitat. It receives little funding so depends mainly on fundraising. It remains largely untouched by humans although there are walking trails for visitors to follow.

Hope Sawyer Buyukmihci was featured on a women's history postcard printed by the Helaine Victoria Press set up by Nancy Poore and Jocelyn H. Cohen.
