= Dutch rabbit =

Breed of rabbit

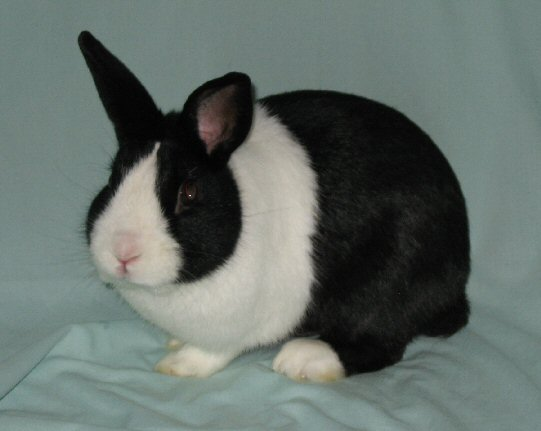
Dutch rabbit

The Dutch rabbit, historically known as Hollander or Brabander, is a breed of domestic rabbit. It is easily identifiable by its characteristic color pattern and was once the most popular of all rabbit breeds. However, after dwarf rabbits were developed, the popularity of the Dutch rabbit declined. Nevertheless, the Dutch rabbit remains one of the top ten most popular breeds worldwide.

"Although the name suggests that the Dutch rabbit is from the Netherlands, it was actually developed in England. During the 1830s rabbits were imported to England from Ostend in Belgium every week for the meat market. Amongst these rabbits was a breed known as the Petit Brabançon, as it originated from Brabant in Flanders. The Petit Brabançon may still be found in paintings from the fifteenth century. The Dutch rabbit has its genetic roots in this old breed. The Petit Brabançon would often display Dutch markings, and breeders in England selected those with even markings, fixing those markings into the breed we know today."

Dutch are very popular as pets. They are also commonly raised among rabbit exhibitors.

== Appearance ==
The American Rabbit Breeders Association standard calls for a small to medium rabbit. Dutch are a 4-class breed. Junior bucks and does are those under 6 months of age with a minimum weight of 1.75 lbs (0,793 kg). Seniors are 6 months of age and over, weighing between 3.5 (1,58 kg) and 5.5 lbs (2,48 kg), with 4.5 (2,04 kg) being the ideal weight. Dutch are to have a compact, well-rounded body; rounded head; short, stocky, well-furred ears; and short, glossy "flyback" fur. Nine colors (in conjunction with white) are recognized for show:

Black, a dense, glossy black with a slate blue undercolor. Their eyes could come off as dark brown.

Blue, a medium blue-gray with a slate blue undercolor. Eyes—blue-gray.

Chocolate, a rich chocolate brown with a dove-gray undercolor. Eyes—brown (with a ruby cast).

Lilac, (UK: Pale Grey) A uniform, medium dove gray with a delicate pink tint to the surface. Color is to be carried well down the hair shaft to a slightly paler dove gray. Eyes – Blue-gray, ruby cast permissible.

Chinchilla, an agouti color with bands of pearl white and black with a slate blue undercolor. The ears must have black lacing. Eyes—brown (preferred).

Gray, (UK: Brown Grey) an Agouti color similar to that of the American cottontail, with bands of color on the hairshaft which produce a ring effect when blown into. The bands of color should be a light tan, a thin charcoal band then a darker tan over a slate blue undercolor. Eyes—dark brown.

Steel, (UK: Steel Grey) a black color with off-white tips to the hairshaft on some hairs. The undercolor is slate blue. Eyes—dark brown.

Tortoise, (UK: Tortoiseshell) a bright, clean orange with slate blue shadings along the ears, whisker beds and hindquarters. the undercolor is dark cream. Eyes—dark brown.

Golden Yellow, (UK: Yellow) Bright, rich deep orange carried with a light cream undercolor. Eyes—Brown

The British Rabbit Council recognizes Tri-Coloured Dutch, but they are a separate breed.

Despite its popularity, the Dutch rabbit has not changed much over the years. The most striking aspect of the breed is the marking pattern:

The blaze is an even wedge of white running up the rabbit's face. It is shaped by the cheeks which are the rounded circles of color on either side of the face. The neck marking is a white wedge on the back of the head. The saddle is to be a straight line running behind the shoulders and continuing underneath the rabbit to the undercut across the belly. The stops are located on the rear feet, which should be white from the toes to a point one third the length of the foot.

The American standard allots 50 of the 100 total points to markings, 25 points to general type, 10 points to color, 10 points to fur and 5 to condition.

== Personality ==
The Dutch Rabbit is in general a calm breed, they are affectionate, love their owners and are easy-going rabbits. They make a good domestic pet, and are easy to train.

== The BRC and UKDRC Standard ==
Ears short and strong, not pointed, and fairly broad at their base. (10 points) (1 point if eyes have pink eye) Eyes bold and bright, fairly large. (5 points)

Blaze wedged shaped, carrying up to a point between ears.

Cheeks as round as possible, and coming as near to the whiskers without touching. Also covering the line of the jawbone. (15 points with Blaze)

Clean Neck means free from coloured fur immediately behind the ears. (10 points)

Saddle is the junction between the white and coloured fur on the back. This line to continue right round the animal in an even straight line. (10 points)

Undercut continuation of the saddle. To be as near up to the front legs as possible without touching them. (10 points)

Stops white markings on the hind feet, about 1 1/4 inches long, and to cut cleanly round the foot in a similar manner to the saddle and undercut. (15 points)

Colour see below for colours. (10 points)

Shape (type) and Condition compact, cobby, rounded. Shape also means type. Weight and condition also have a bearing on shape or type. The ideal weight of an Adult Dutch should be 4 1/2 to 5 lbs. Hard and firm in flesh. Back well covered with firm flesh. Not baggy in belly. Skin tight, gloss on coat, bright eyes, lively, alert. (15 points)

Classes for young Dutch rabbits are recommended by the UKDRC as being for Dutch rabbits under five months of age.

Disqualifications: Wrong coloured eyes (see Colour Standard). Discoloured or wall eyes (pale blue iris), specked eyes (pale blue spots or specks on the iris). Coloured fur on the White part or white patches on the coloured parts. Flesh markings (usually on ears). Trimming (attempts to straighten out irregularities, dyeing white spots on coloured fur etc.). Malocclusion and mutilated teeth.

Black - Deep, solid and carrying well down to the skin, with blue under colour, the deeper the better. Free from white hairs and mealiness or flecking. Eyes dark hazel.

Blue - Deep, solid, slate blue, colour to carry well down to the skin. Blue under colour, the deeper the better. Free from white hairs and flecked or mealy coat. Eyes dark blue.

Steel Grey - Dark steel grey merging to pale slate blue in the undercolour. The whole interspersed with black guard hairs. The medium bright and evenly ticked shade is the one to aim for and the extreme tips of the fur will be tipped with steel blue or grey. The mixture to carry well down the sides, flanks and hind feet. Belly colour will be a lighter shade varying with the top colour. Upper part of the tail to match the body colour; underside to tone with the belly colour. Ears to match body, Eyes deep hazel.

Brown Grey - Slate blue at the base followed by a band of yellowy orange then a black line, finishing by light or nut brown tips to the fur. The whole interspersed by black guard hairs. That is the impression gained when the fur of the brown grey is parted. The general impression should be light or nut brown on ears, cheeks, body, hind feet and top of tail, the whole ticked with black hairs. Belly colour and eye circles (small as possible) bright straw colour. A lighter shade permissible under tail. Eyes hazel, deeper the better.

Pale Grey - Top colour biscuit carrying well down and merging into pale slate at the base, the whole interspersed with black ticking. The general impression should be biscuit tipped with black on ears, cheeks, body and top of tail. Belly colour white with pale slate undercolour. Eye circle white but ideally non-existent or as small as possible. Body colour should be present on hind feet. Underside of tail white. Eyes hazel.

Tortoiseshell - An even shade of orange top colour to carry well down and shading off to a lighter colour to the skin. Ears, belly and under the tail blue-black. Cheeks and hind quarters (flanks) shaded or toned with blue black. Eyes hazel, the deeper the better.

Chocolate - Deep solid dark chocolate, colour carrying well down to the skin. Undercolour to match the top colour as near as possible. The deeper the under colour the better the top will appear. Free from white hairs and mealiness. Eyes hazel, the deeper the better.

Yellow - An even shade of yellow throughout. The exact shade is not so important as that the colour should be even and extend to the belly or undercut and no eye circles. In fact, a self colour free from chinchillation on cheeks and hind feet. Eyes hazel.

Description of terms used: Flecking or Mealiness - Individual hairs more than one colour in selfs. e.g. Blacks should be black at the tip of the fur, that colour carrying down the fur as far as possible, then merging into blue. In flecked or mealy exhibits the individual fur would be black, then dark grey, then a deeper shade before merging into blue at the base.

Chinchillation - A mixture of colours ticked with a darker shade, often found on the cheeks of yellows. The steel, pale and brown grey are chinchillated varieties to a certain extent.

The BRC has a separate standard for Tri Coloured Dutch.

== See also ==
- Domestic rabbit
- List of rabbit breeds
