= Checkered Giant rabbit =

Breed of rabbit

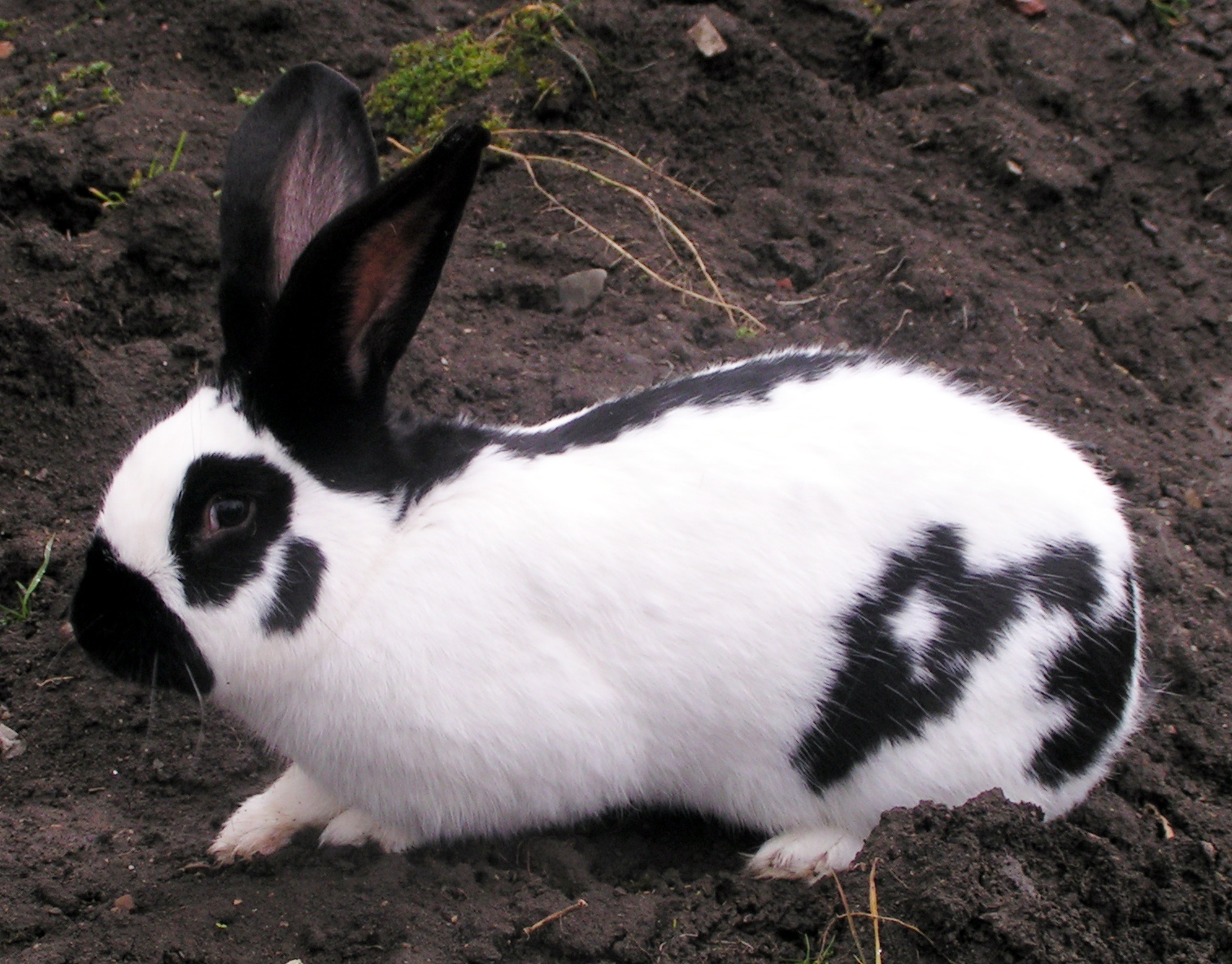
A mature Checkered Giant rabbit (black variety)

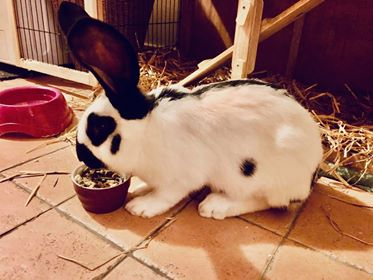
A 3-month old Checkered Giant rabbit (black variety)

The Checkered Giant, known as Géant Papillon in French, is a breed of domestic rabbit that originated in France. One of the largest rabbit breeds, the Checkered Giant is recognized by the American Rabbit Breeders Association (ARBA). The Checkered Giant is one of the minority of rabbit breeds with specific coat markings. The markings defined in the breed standard of the Checkered Giant differ somewhat from those in the breed standard of the Giant Papillon. For ARBA show purposes, a mature Checkered Giant buck must weigh a minimum of 11 pounds (5.0 kg), and a mature doe must weigh a minimum of 12 pounds (5.4 kg). ARBA does not specify a maximum weight for Checkered Giants.

== History ==
In 1904, Otto Reinhardt of Reinfalz, Germany interbred the Great German Spot and black Flemish Giant rabbit. Six years later, the Checkered Giant was introduced in the United States. Some time later, a smaller variant - the Miniature Checkered rabbit- was bred in the Netherlands, where it is a stable breed.

== Appearance ==
For the Checkered Giant, ARBA recognizes two varieties: Black ("white with black markings"), and Blue ("white with gray markings"). Each sex and variety is judged separately.

ARBA show weights of the Checkered Giant
Category	Age	Minimum Weight	Maximum Weight
Senior Does	8+ months old	12 lb (5.4 kg)	[none specified]
Senior Bucks	8+ months old	11 lb (5.0 kg)	[none specified]
Intermediate Does & Bucks	6–8 months old	9 lb (4.1 kg)	[none specified]
Junior Does & Bucks	3–6 months old	6 lb (2.7 kg)	[none specified]
Pre-Junior Does & Bucks	<3 months old	4 lb (1.8 kg)	7 lb (3.2 kg)

== See also ==
- Domestic rabbit (includes rabbit health and care)
- List of rabbit breeds
