= District heating substation =

Component in a district heating network

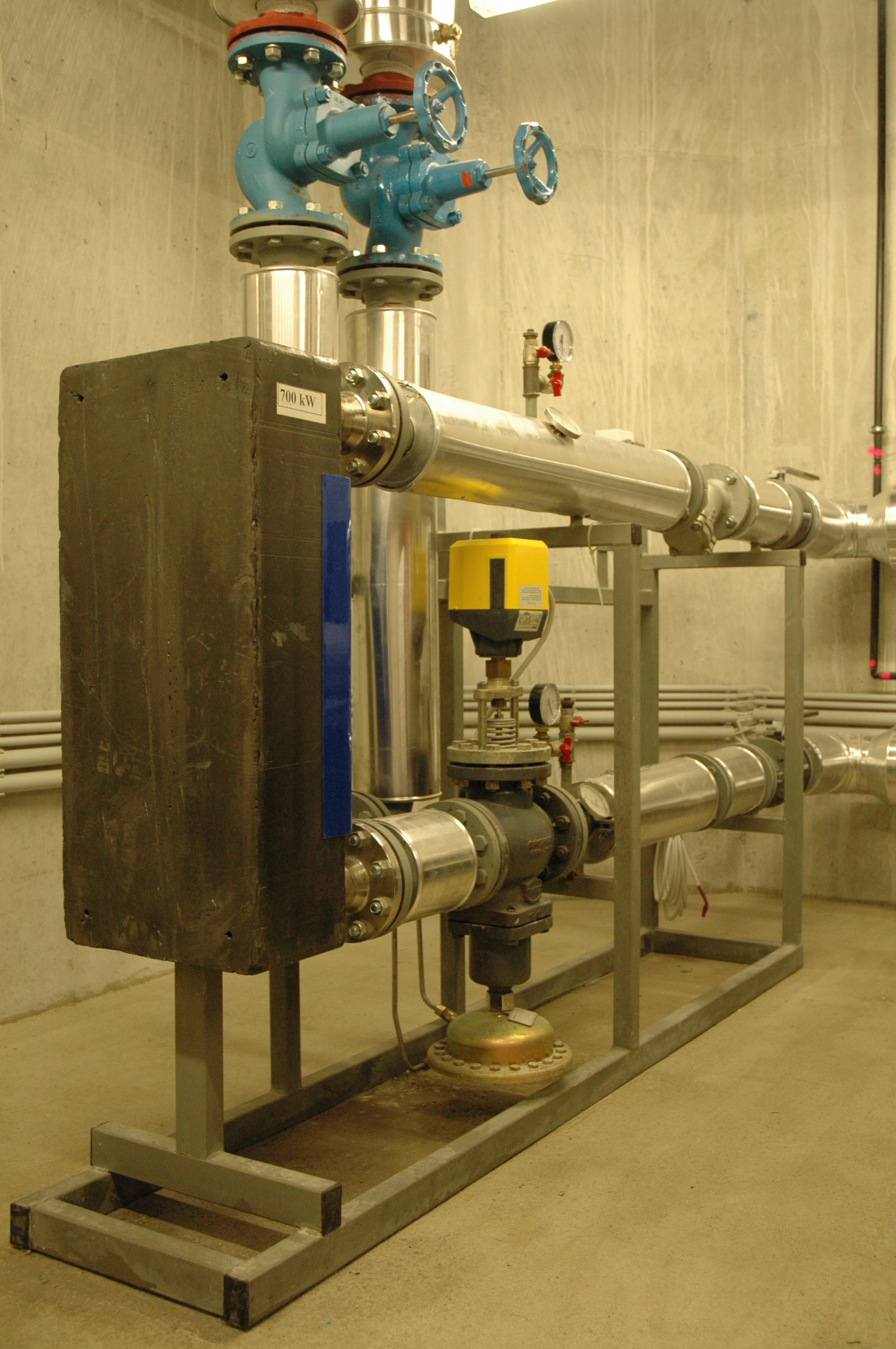
A district heating substation with a thermal capacity of 700 kW. This unit isolates the water circuit of the district heating system from the customer's central heating system.

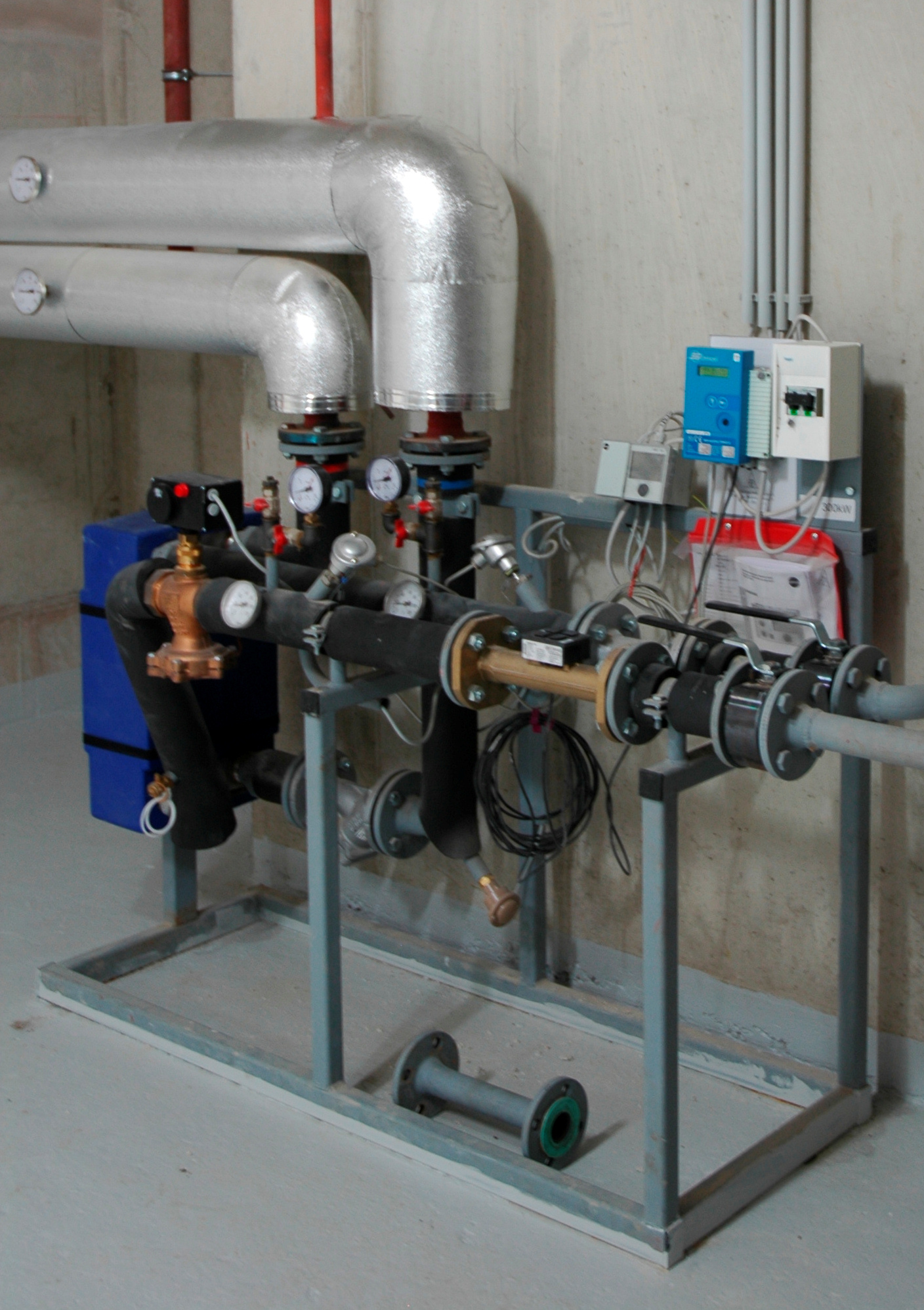
A district heating substation in a residential neighborhood with a thermal capacity of 300 kW. Two components of the heat meter are visible: the metering electronics unit on the right (white/blue box), and the ultrasonic flow meter in the center (bronze tube).

A district heating substation is a component in a district heating system that connects the main network to a building's own heating system.

== Parts ==
The station normally has one or more of the following parts:

- Heat exchanger - to split primary and secondary side of the system
- Control valve - to regulate the flow through the heat exchanger
- Heat meter - to measure energy consumption and allocate costs
- Strainer - to remove particles that could block heat exchanger or control valve
- Shutdown valve - to stop the flow on primary side in case of service or emergency
- Differential pressure controller - to balance the network and improve working conditions of control valve
- Temperature controller - to control temperature on secondary side by regulating the flow on primary side
- Temperature sensor - to sense flow and return temperatures required for temperature control

== Additional parts ==
In addition, a district heating substation may also include:

- Pump
- Manometer
- Safety valve
- Non-return valve

== See also ==
- Cold district heating
- Drammen Heat Pump
- Vatajankoski Power Plant
