= Ian Gillespie (developer) =

Canadian real estate developer

- Born: September 30, 1961 (age 65); Port Coquitlam, British Columbia, Canada
- Education: University of British Columbia; University of Toronto
- Occupation: Architect
- Spouse: Stephanie Dong

Ian Gillespie (born 30 September 1961) is a Canadian real estate developer. In 1992 he founded Westbank Projects Corp. based in Vancouver, British Columbia, which now has more than $50 billion of projects completed or under development. The company is active across Canada and expanding into the United States & Japan with projects including residential, rental, affordable housing, office, retail, hotels and public art.

== Biography ==
Gillespie was born in Port Coquitlam, one of five children. His father was a technician at an oil refinery and his mother worked at Riverview Hospital, and both were lifelong environmental activists. He completed a Business degree at the University of British Columbia (1985) and then an MBA at the University of Toronto, (1986) after which he went to work for his mother's cousins company, shopping centre developer Schroeder Properties in Vancouver. Gillespie is married to Stephanie Dong, niece of Vancouver property magnate Robert H. Lee.

== Westbank ==
In 1992, Gillespie started Westbank Projects Corp. To date, the Westbank group of companies employs in excess of 1800 people, including its construction company ICON West Construction, three hotels and restaurants, and the recent acquisition of downtown Vancouver's district utility company Central Heat, which Westbank rebranded Creative Energy in 2014.

=== LEED and Low Carbon Development ===
Westbank has completed two of North America's first LEED Platinum office buildings, Telus Garden, on completion Canada's most sustainable office building and Telus Sky, as well as the targeted LEED Platinum residential high rise at Vancouver House, and the re-development of Oakridge Centre, as Vancouver's designated new town centre and a LEED Platinum neighbourhood.

Westbank low carbon projects currently under development include Senakw in partnership with the Squamish Nation, a carbon-neutral rental residential development project and one of the largest First Nations economic development projects in Canada. Westbank is also currently developing a net zero carbon campus in Silicon Valley, with six mixed-use projects in Downtown San Jose.

== Projects ==
Westbank creates housing across the continuum with projects ranging from affordable and market rental housing to definitive luxury residential developments.

Gillespie has worked with global architects including Bjarke Ingels Group (BIG), James K.M. Cheng Architects, Henriquez Partners Architects, Hariri Pontarini Architects, Kengo Kuma and Associates and Studio Gang Architects.

Around 2008 Woodward's the department store, built in 1903, was redeveloped amid controversy with affordable housing, retail and restoration of the ‘W’ neon sign using LED lights atop the building. (BC Business Magazine called it "the most complicated and ambitious development in Vancouver's civic history." The Vancouver Sun ranked Woodward's as number 2 in their piece, "10 highlights from the first 125 years."

== District energy ==
In 2013 Gillespie's Westbank Projects Corp. purchased Central Heat Distribution, the major provider of heat in Vancouver and rebranded it Creative Energy. Creative Energy is currently undertaking the "Creative Energy Decarbonization Project"[11] which will add new electrode steam boilers to an existing natural gas-powered steam plant, transitioning the district energy system to low-carbon energy sources to serve approximately 12 million square feet of new development in downtown, the West End, North East False Creek, and False Creek Flats. Westbank recently constructed a low-carbon utility harnessing the energy from the waste heat of the nearby TELUS Switching centre, for its $750-million TELUS Garden Project and is currently partnering with the city to create a similar low-carbon energy recovery program for the Oakridge Centre redevelopment, for which Westbank is the residential developer.

== Philanthropy ==
In 2018 Gillespie donated $2.5 million to the Emily Carr School of Arts and $1.5 million to the VGH / UBC Hospital foundation(s).

== Criticisms ==
Westbank has been criticized for marketing luxury homes overseas and promoting foreign homeownership in Vancouver. Critics argue that foreign buyers are to blame for the affordability crisis in Vancouver, where rapid population growth and the city's emergence as a North American tech hub combined with a housing shortage are contributing to surging home prices. In June 2018, Westbank faced controversy over its Westbank China website where housing advocates accused the company of restricting access to the site. A marketing post on the website promoted investment with several “hot topic selling points" including banks lowering mortgage rates especially compared to England, the U.S. and Australia; Vancouver as a home for the global rich; and a 26 per cent increase in condo prices last year.

== Notables ==
2010: Shangri-La Vancouver won the Real Estate Board of Greater Vancouver (REBGV) Commercial Building Awards - Excellence award in the hospitality/hotel category. 2010: Best of Commercial Building Awards, Vancouver: Woodward's Building Redevelopment, Judges’ Choice Award for best overall of the 36 entries. Woodward's also won the Excellence Award in the mixed-use commercial/residential category for owner/developer Ian Gillespie of Westbank and Ben Yeung, Peterson Investment Group.

- 2011: Woodward's Building wins Azure Magazine 2011 Design Exchange Awards, Gold, Architecture – Residential
- 2011: Woodward's Building is ranked as number 2 in Vancouver Sun's piece on '10 highlights from the first 125 years.'
- 2013: Shangri-La Toronto/Momofuku wins Award of Excellence, Toronto Urban Design Awards
- 2013: Fairmont Pacific Rim garners Best City Centre Hotel, Canada from Travel + Leisure Magazine.
- 2013: Shangri-La Toronto voted The Best Urban Hotels 2013, Wallpaper Magazine.
- 2014: Shangri-La Vancouver received 2014 AAA Five-Diamond Award, 2nd consecutive year, highest hotel & restaurant rating in Vancouver
- 2014: International Property Awards MIPIM in Cannes, Bjarke Ingels Group received the Architectural Review Future Award for the Beach & Howe (Vancouver House) tower in Vancouver & Mixed-Use Tower in Vancouver, (Vancouver House) in the category ‘Tall Buildings’.
- 2015: Vancouver House is awarded Future Project of the Year at the 2015 World Architecture Festival.
- 2021: Tall + Urban Innovation Conference Council on Tall Buildings and Urban Habitat in Virtual, Westbank and Bjarke Ingels Group received an Award of Excellence: Best Tall Building Worldwide (Vancouver House) in the categories of: ‘Best Tall Building Worldwide 2021 Winner’, 'Best Tall Building 100–199 meters 2021 Winner', 'Best Tall Residential or Hotel Building 2021 Winner'.
