= Ecoheatcool =

Ecoheatcool project was launched at the beginning of 2005 with support from the Intelligent Energy Europe Programme. The project was carried out by Euroheat & Power, in cooperation with 13 partners across Europe, and concluded at the end of December 2006.

32 European countries, including the 25 member states of the European Union (as of 2004), the 4 accession countries, as of 2007, (Romania, Bulgaria, Turkey, Croatia), and three EFTA countries (Iceland, Norway and Switzerland) were included in the analysis for the project.

The project assessed the heating and cooling markets, looked for possibilities for more district heating and district cooling in Europe, provided recommendations for policy makers and developed a tool for assessing the efficiency of district heating and cooling systems.

The project showed that district heating and cooling grids make it possible to optimally use and combine a large spectrum of "free" energy inputs: surplus heat from electricity production based on conventional or renewable fuels, from waste incineration and/or from industrial processes as well as different forms of renewable heat (i.e. geothermal, heat/cold from deep-sea or lake water).

The Ecoheatcool project became a reference for district heating and cooling sector, its findings being used in the arguments provided to European Union and national policy makers. It enabled the development of a vision, quantification of the benefits which the district heating and cooling sector can bring to achieving the EU policy objectives: energy efficiency, environmental protection, security of supply, use of renewable energy sources, avoided investments in peak electricity capacities, and evaluation of the costs.

== Findings ==
=== Energy Balance in Europe ===
Energy demands and the cost of the heating demands of the industrial, residential, service, agricultural and transportation sectors were estimated using data from the 2003 IEA energy balances for OECD and non-OECD countries. The report concluded that heat loss from the energy transformation sector corresponded to 29% of all primary energy supply, due to inefficiencies in the conversion of energy in thermal power generation. Hence, resolving these inefficiencies can assist in greater energy efficiency, lowered emissions of carbon dioxide and greater security in the energy supply for Europe.

=== Heating Market in Europe ===
In the industrial, residential and service sectors, heat is generally derived from natural gas and electricity. Excluding the industrial sectors, heat is mainly used for space heating, with the greatest demand appearing in urban areas. However, estimates in the report exclude the amount of heat required for maintenance of indoor temperatures and hot water consumption, due to a lack of data. These parameters can help to increase the accuracy of findings as heat use is proportional to the difference in outdoor temperatures and indoor temperatures maintained (as outdoor temperatures decrease more from typical indoor temperatures, more heat is used); while hot water preparation is the second-largest contributor to heat demand after space heating in Europe.

=== Cooling Market in Europe ===
The cooling market was found be expanding at a greater rate than previous estimations. The main demand for cooling is non-climatic conditions such as air-conditioning in office and residential spaces, enabling higher rental values for commercial buildings, and greater comfort for households respectively. District cooling systems are seen as an environmentally-sound method to expand Europe's cooling systems, in contrast to air-conditioning, but their implementation as of 2003 was limited, existing in densely populated city centers and commercial areas in Europe, contributing to only 1-2% of market share.
