= Vatajankoski Power Plant =

Vatajankoski Power Plant is a thermal power plant in the southwestern part of Finland.

== History ==
In July 2022, the power station installed a sand battery developed by Polar Night Energy, a Finland-based company. It has a rated capacity of 100 kW of heating power and 8 MWh of energy capacity.

The power plant distributes heat through its district heating system.
