= Creative Energy =

Canadian private district heating company

- Formerly: Central Heat Distribution Ltd.
- Type: Private
- Headquarters: Vancouver, British Columbia
- Services: Construction and operations of district heating systems
- Website: creative.energy

Creative Energy is a Canadian private district heating company. The company was founded on November 1, 1968, by group of engineers with a desire to lower heating bills for buildings (no boilers to buy and maintain) and reduce the amount of pollution being created to provide heat downtown. In 2014, Central Heat Distribution was rebranded as Creative Energy and began taking on additional district heating projects in Vancouver and Toronto.

== Facilities ==
=== Beatty Street, Vancouver ===
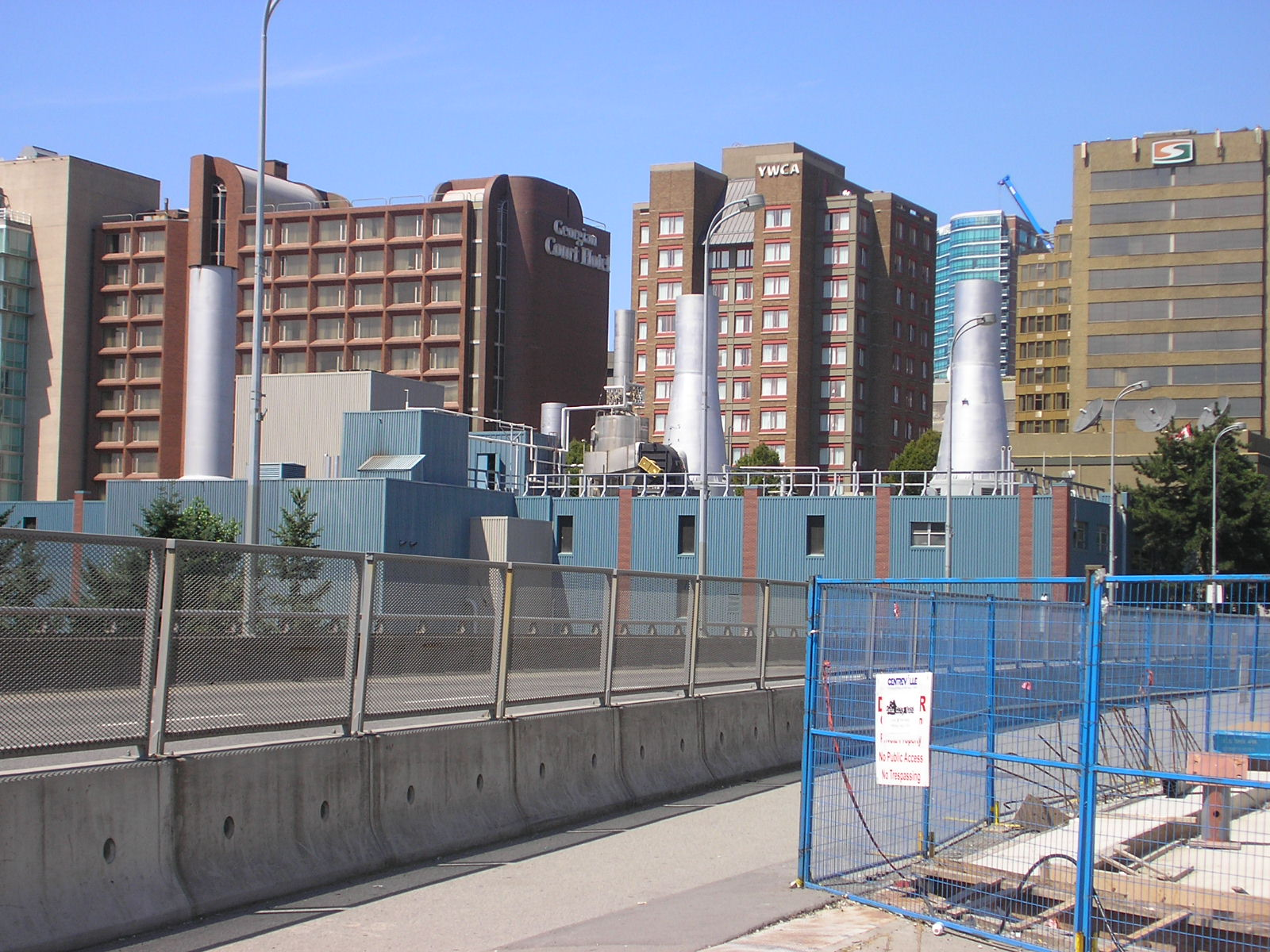
Beatty Street facility, as seen from Rogers Arena looking Southwest towards Downtown Vancouver with the Georgia Viaduct in the foreground.

A Creative Energy owned a operated district energy facility at 720 Beatty Street in Vancouver provides heat to the Downtown Core including the Vancouver Public Library Central Branch, BC Place, Rogers Arena, Queen Elizabeth Theatre, Pacific Centre and most major hotel/office/condo towers such as Shaw Tower via a 10.5 km network of high-pressure pipes between five centimetres and 50 centimetres in diameter running anywhere from one to five metres below street surfaces.

The original world-famous steam clock in Gastown was once a notable addition to the more than 180 buildings that are served by the natural gas powered boiler located in the Stadium/Entertainment district of downtown. The current clock is electrically powered.

The massive building that occupies the west end of the Georgia Viaduct was once home to the printing plant for Pacific Press the publishers of The Vancouver Sun and The Province newspapers.

In 2020, a plan was approved to replace the building with an office and entertainment complex that will have an expanded electric steam plant in the basement.

=== Oakridge, Vancouver ===
As part of the Oakridge Centre redevelopment in Vancouver, Creative Energy is building a district energy facility for the Oakridge neighbourhood that will be integrated into Westbank's buildings. The facility, estimated for completion in 2027, will use a mix of gas and electric boilers connected to a geothermal heat pump.

=== Main Alley, Vancouver ===
Main Alley is a proposed district cooling project for office buildings on Main Street in Vancouver that would be an extension of a current facility on East Fifth Avenue.

=== TRU, Kamloops ===
Creative Energy is working with Thompson Rivers University in Kamloops to introduce three mini-district energy facility powered by electric boilers across its campus by 2024.

=== Horseshoe Bay ===
As part of a luxury waterfront development in the Horseshoe Bay neighbourhood of West Vancouver, Creative Energy installed a geothermal system that extracts heat from the ocean.

=== Mirvish Village, Toronto ===
A mixed energy source district heating project is currently underway, as of May 2021, as part of the Mirvish Village redevelopment in Toronto.
