= Liffey Service Tunnel =

Utility facility in Dublin, Ireland

River Liffey Service Tunnel
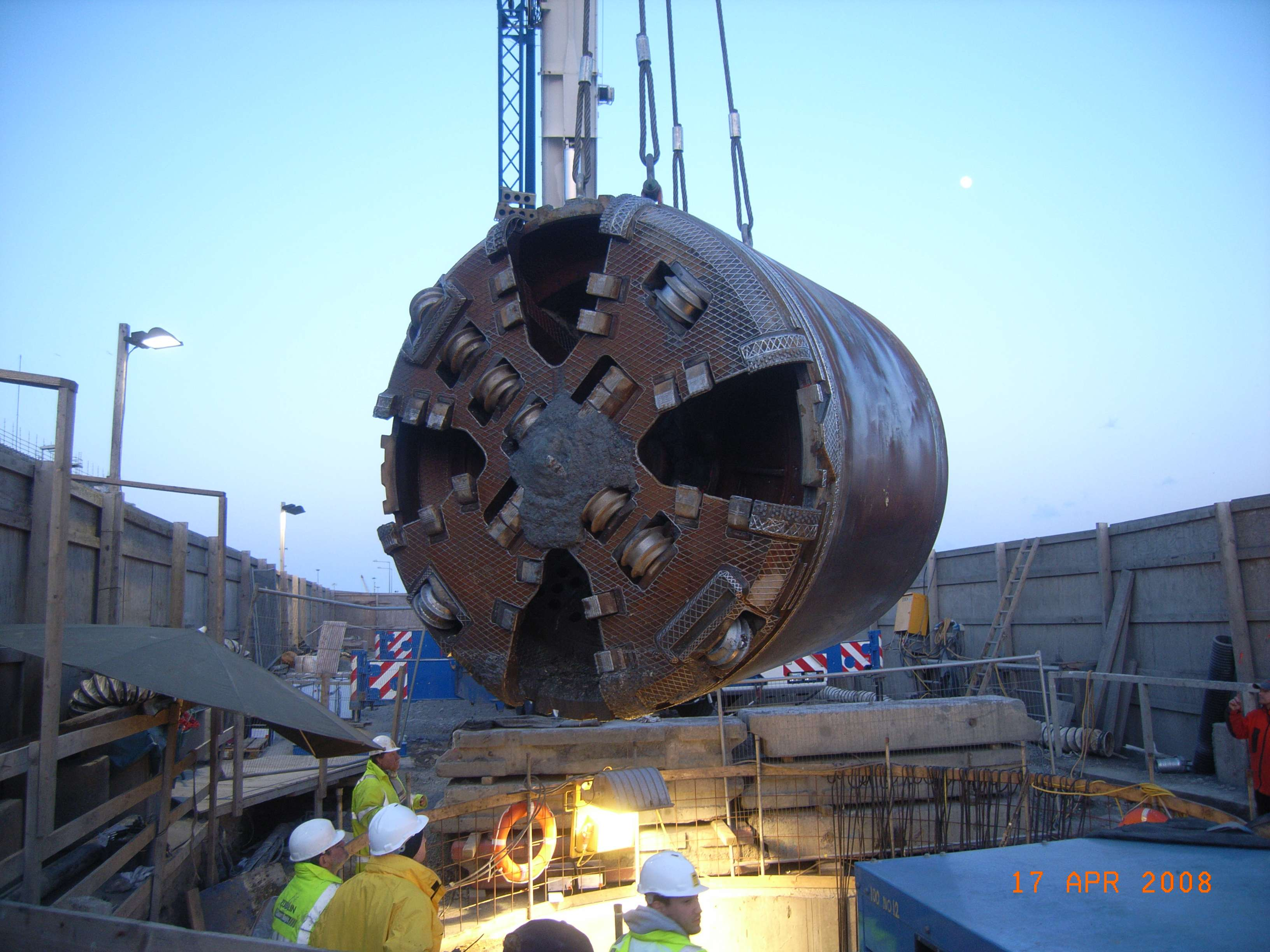
- Recovery of the TBM after tunnel completion
- Interactive map of River Liffey Service Tunnel

Overview
- Location: Dublin, Ireland
- Coordinates: 53°20′48″N 6°13′49″W

Operation
- Work began: 2006
- Constructed: Pipe Jacking
- Opened: 2008
- Owner: Dublin City Council

Technical
- Length: 260 m (280 yd)
- Tunnel clearance: 2.5 m (8 ft 2 in) ID

The Liffey Service Tunnel (Irish: Tollán Sheirbhísí na Life) is a service tunnel for various pipelines in Dublin, Ireland, owned by Dublin City Council.

== Project ==
The tunnel was designed by British company Atkins and constructed by a joint venture of the German contractor Züblin and the Irish contractor Cleary & Doyle of Wexford. Its construction took place from September 2006 until October 2008.

== Tunnel design ==
The tunnel is 260 m (280 yd) long and consists of a single bore of diameter 2.96 m (9 ft 9 in). It was built in pipe-jacking using a Herrenknecht tunnel-boring machine and 2.5 m (8 ft 2 in)-long precast reinforced-concrete pipes. The tunnel leads from the southern edge of the East Link Bridge, underneath the River Liffey towards the North Quay Wall, approximately 150 m (160 yd) west of 3Arena. The drive and reception shafts are respectively 19 m (62 ft) and 22 m (72 ft) deep, leaving the tunnel passing approximately 8 m (26 ft) below the shipping channel of the river.

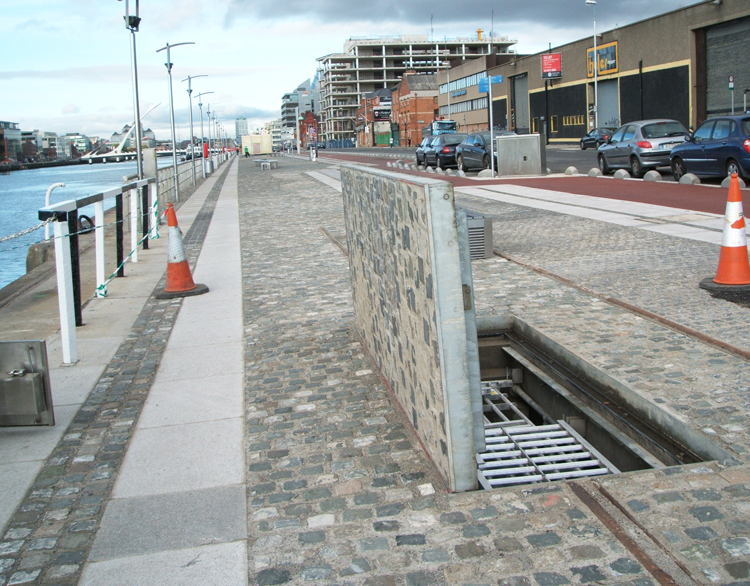
An access cover near the northern end of the tunnel
