= Drammen Heat Pump =

District heating system in Drammen, Norway

Drammen Fjernvarme Heat Pump
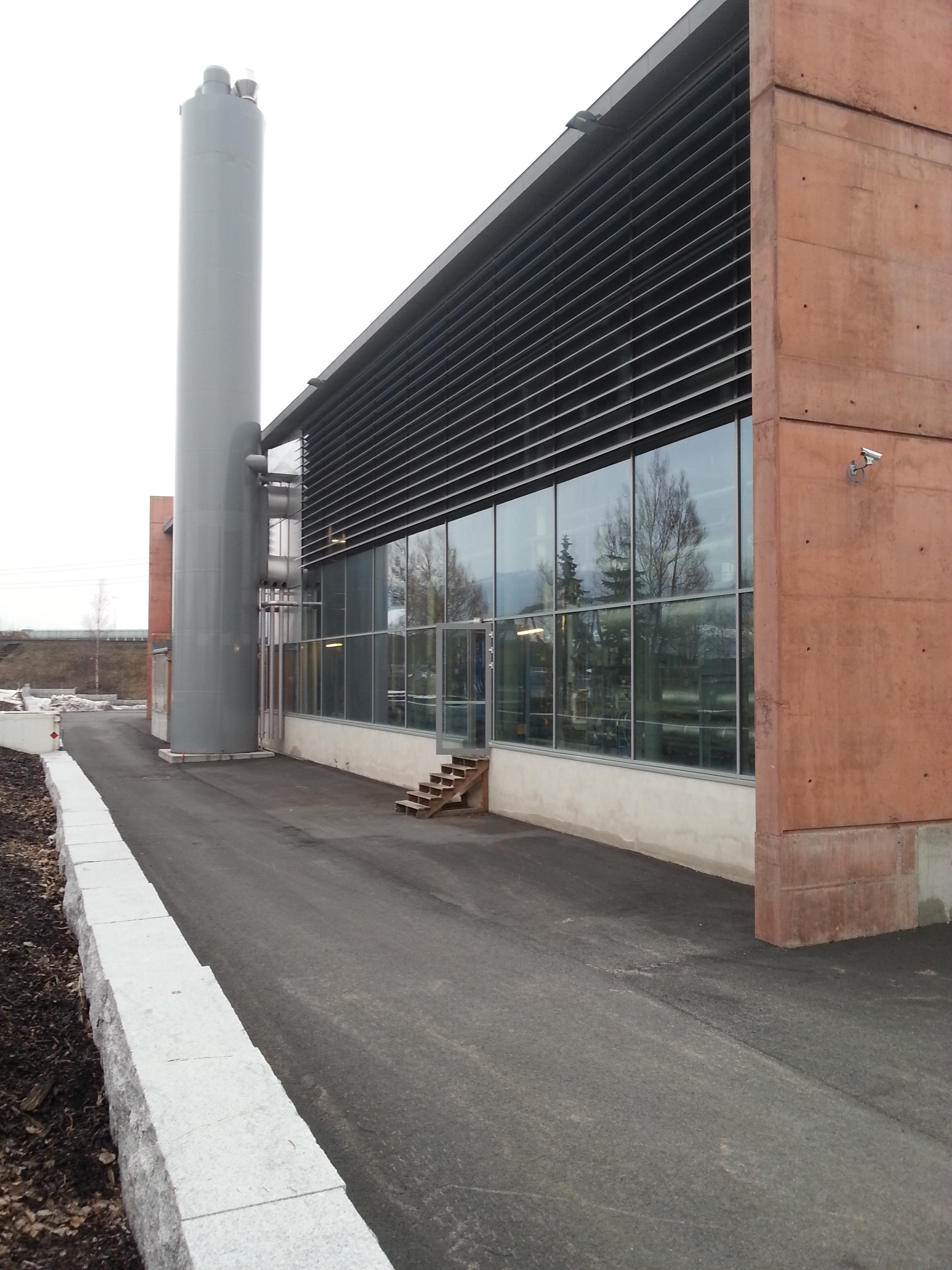
- The building containing the 14 MW heat pump system.
- Country: Norway
- Location: Brakerøya, Drammen
- Coordinates: 59.740833°N 10.23°E
- Status: Operational
- Commission date: 2011
- Owner: Drammen Fjernvarme

Power generation
- Annual net output: 67 GWh (heat)

Drammen Fjernvarme District Heating is a district heating system in Drammen, Norway, a regional capital some 65 km west of Oslo.

The heat pump was manufactured by Star Refrigeration in 2011 with three systems giving a combined capacity of 14 MWs to central Drammen providing 85% of hot water needed for the city. The district heating system is owned and operated by Drammen Fjernvarme who have the rights to the concession area given by the Drammen Municipality. This requires all new buildings larger than 1000 m^{2} to be built with a water-based heating system and connected to the district heating system.

The heat pump uses the natural refrigerant ammonia that has a zero global warming potential and is not a greenhouse gas. The heat source is seawater that is taken in around 8 or 9 °C from a depth of 18 m and is cooled by low pressure liquid refrigerant. Using a vapor-compression refrigeration cycle, the system heats district water from 65 °C to 90 °C for use in building heating and hot water systems. The system has an average coefficient of performance (COP) of 3.0 which means 1 unit of electricity is combined with 2 units of heat from the seawater to provide 3 units of heat to the district heating circuit. With the low cost of hydro-based electricity, it is cheaper to run a heat pump than a gas or electric boiler. In addition, the compressor technology used in the Drammen heat pump is the single screw compressor from Vilter (Emerson). Its internal design allows for balanced forces allowing it to perform with a very long bearing life at more than 120,000 hours for normal refrigeration compressors.

The heat is extracted from a local fjord whose water temperature is around 8 °C. The water is heated from recovered energy at a temperature of 120 °C. A city ordinance requires most new buildings to exploit this form of heating.
