= South Hill =

South Hill may refer to:

== United States ==
- South Hill (Eureka County, Nevada), a summit
- South Hill, New York, a census-designated place in Tompkins County
- South Hill (Oneida County, New York), a summit
- South Hill (Otsego County, New York), a mountain chain
- South Hill, Minot, North Dakota, a neighborhood
- South Hill, Virginia, a town in Mecklenburg County
- South Hill, Washington, a census-designated place in Pierce County
- South Hill, a broad feature beginning in Spokane, Washington

== Other countries ==
- South Hill, Anguilla, a district
- South Hill, Jersey, a hill on the island of Jersey
- South Hill, Toronto, Ontario, Canada, a neighborhood
- Söderkulla (literally "South Hill"), Finland, a village in the Sipoo municipality
- South Hill, Cornwall, UK, a civil parish and hamlet

== See also ==
- Southill (disambiguation)
