= Toronto Water =

City water department in Toronto, Canada

- Logo of Toronto Water

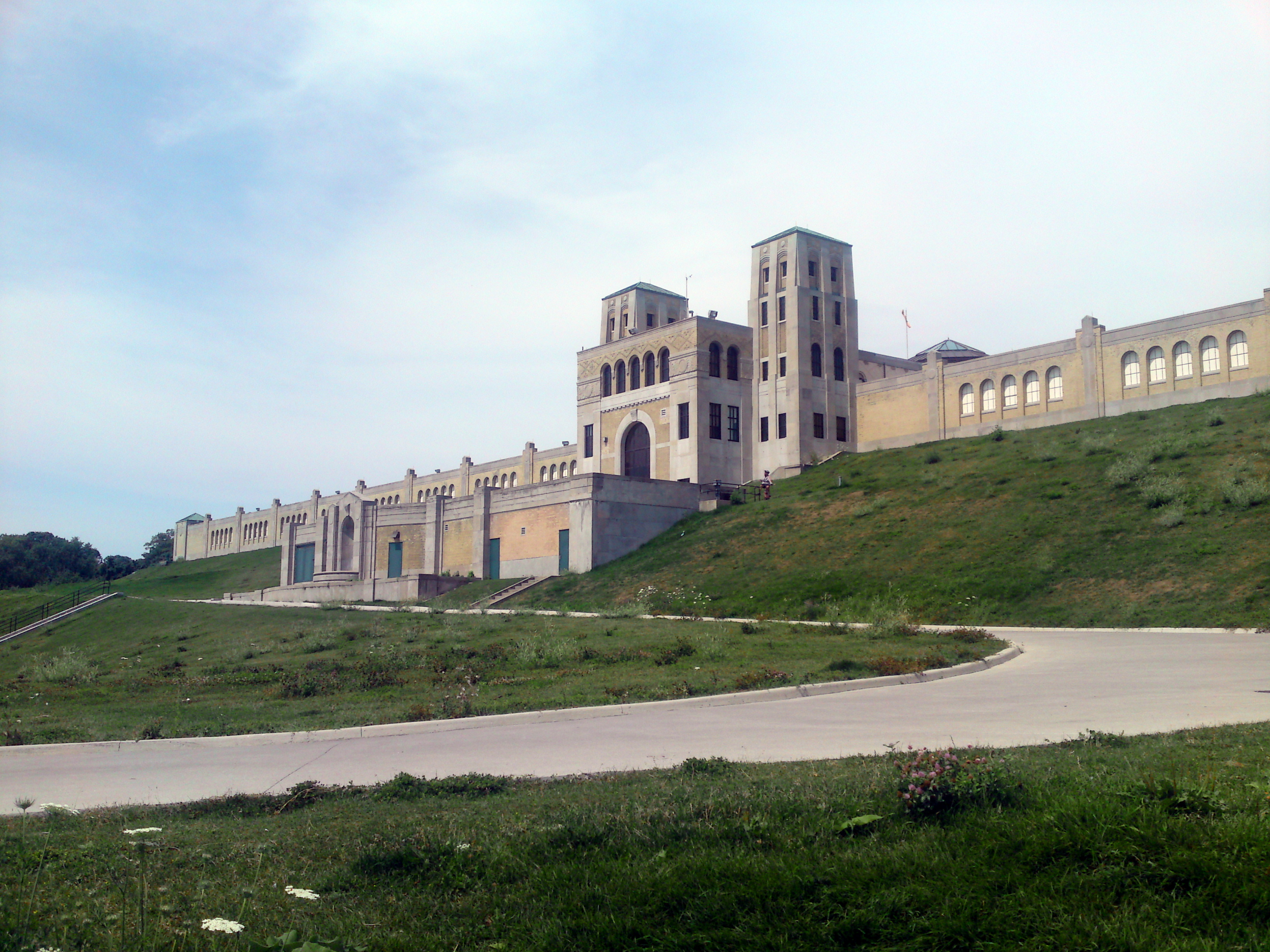
- The R.C. Harris Water Treatment Plant, the City of Toronto's oldest and largest water treatment plant

Agency overview
- Formed: 1872 as Toronto Water Works Commission and 1954 under Metro Toronto Works Department
- Jurisdiction: Toronto and Newmarket, most of Whitchurch-Stouffville, Aurora, Richmond Hill, Markham and Vaughan.
- Headquarters: 60 Tiffield Road
- Employees: ~1700
- Annual budget: Operating: CA$542.4 million; Capital: CA$1.121 billion
- Agency executive: Lou Di Gironimo, General Manager
- Parent department: City of Toronto
- Website: Toronto Water

Toronto Water is the municipal division of the City of Toronto under Infrastructure and Development Services responsible for the water supply network, and stormwater and wastewater management in Toronto, Ontario, Canada, as well as Markham, Vaughan, Richmond Hill, Aurora, Newmarket and Whitchurch-Stouffville.

== History ==
=== Early days ===
Water treatment was originally established in order to provide safe drinking water. In the 19th century, the water off the city's shores was severely polluted by the dumping of waste from residences and businesses.

Before 1842, Toronto's water supply was manually pumped from Lake Ontario, streams and wells. Water carters would take the water and distribute it to customers across the city.

=== Private water supply ===
From 1843 to 1873, water was privately provided by Furniss Works or Toronto Water Works, a subsidiary of Toronto Gas Light and Water Company, which was owned by Montreal businessman Albert Furniss.

Following Furniss's death in 1872, the City of Toronto bought out Furniss Works and transformed the water supply to public hands under the Toronto Water Works Commission.

=== Suburban water supply ===
Prior to the formation of Metropolitan Toronto, the suburban municipalities were responsible for water treatment and water came from local water sources like wells and streams.

Each of the former municipalities had its own treatment plants and pumping stations. North York had three, one at Oriole, which was built in the 1923, the ruins of pumping station found on Duncan Mill Rd, Steeles built in the 1930s, and Sheppard West built in the 1940s. Scarborough had one built in 1921 and New Toronto had one built in 1924.

=== Toronto ===
Metro Toronto was formed in 1953. In 1954, it introduced a single system of supply and treatment for the member municipalities, managed by Metro Toronto. In 1975, Metro started supplying water to Markham, Vaughan, Richmond Hill, Aurora, Newmarket and Whitchurch-Stouffville.

=== Toronto Water creation ===
In 1998, Toronto Water was created from the Toronto Works and Emergency Services and once part of Metro Toronto Works department.

As of April 2005, the departments and commissioners were replaced by divisions under the City Manager (and Deputy Managers). Toronto Water is now under the Toronto Water Division.

== Drinking water operations ==
=== Treatment process ===
Water pumped from Lake Ontario is treated via conventional drinking water treatment processes:

1. Pre-chlorination
2. Flocculation and sedimentation
3. Filtration
4. Chlorination
5. Chloramination, prior to distribution

=== Treatment plants ===
The City of Toronto uses four water treatment plants, all of which are located next to and get their water from Lake Ontario:

Name	Opened	Location	Capacity
R.C. Harris Water Treatment Plant	1941	43.67336°N 79.27906°W	950 ML/d (250 million US gal/d)
Island Water Treatment Plant	1977	43.61503°N 79.38342°W	440 ML/d (120 million US gal/d)
F. J. Horgan Water Treatment Plant	1979	43.75962°N 79.16647°W	800 ML/d (210 million US gal/d)
R. L. Clark Water Treatment Plant	1968	43.59348°N 79.51938°W	615 ML/d (162 million US gal/d)

==== R.C. Harris Water Treatment Plant ====
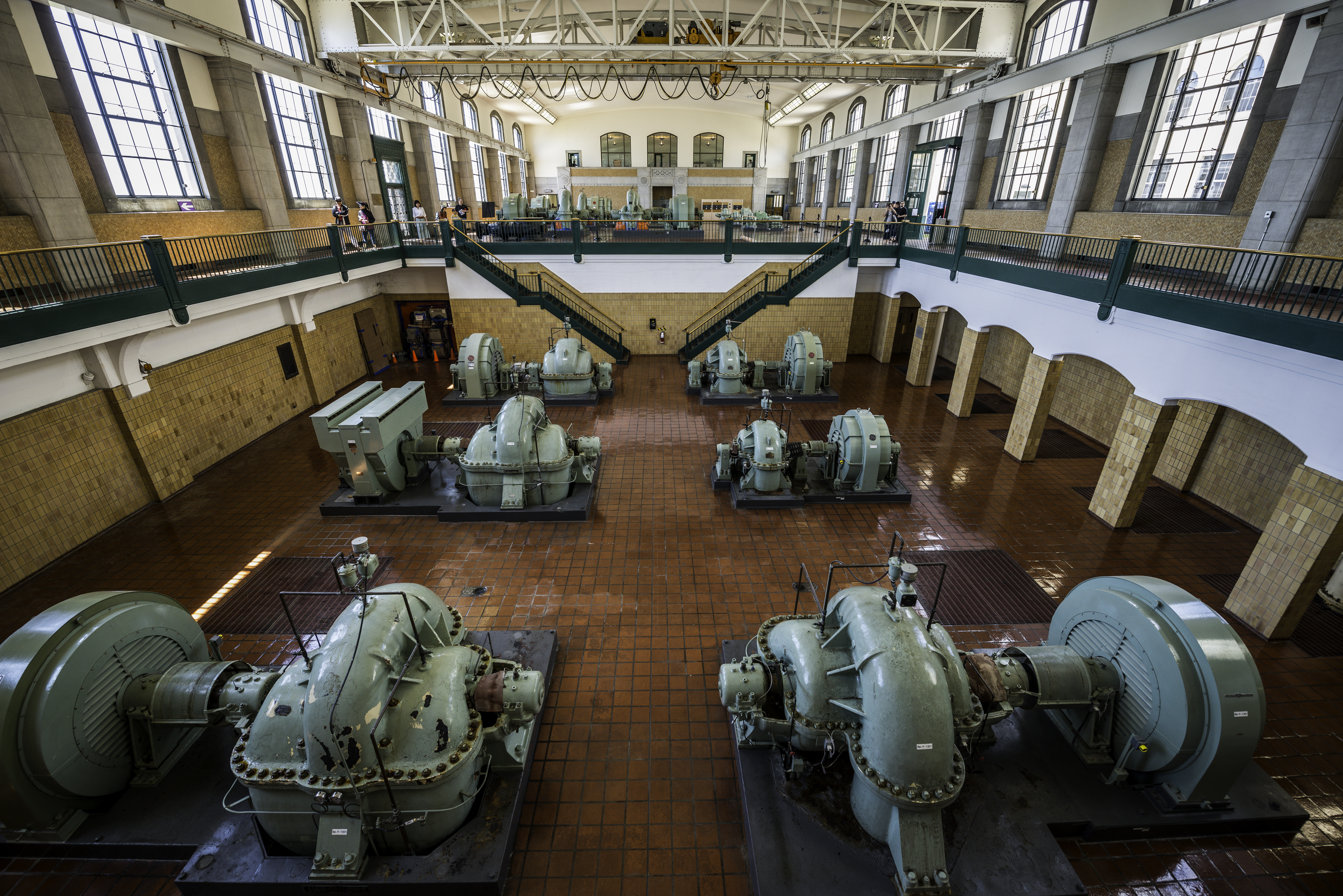
The pumps at the R. C. Harris Water Treatment Plant

The R. C. Harris Water Treatment Plant is located east of Old Toronto at the eastern end of Queen St East and the foot of Victoria Park Ave at Lake Ontario. It is the oldest of the operational water treatment plants in Toronto, being opened on November 1, 1941 after construction started in 1932. The plant has a capacity of 950 million litres per day (250 million US gallons per day) and produces approximately 30% of Toronto's drinking water. The intakes are located over 2.6 kilometres (1.6 miles) from shore in 15 metres (49 ft) of water, running through two pipes under the bed of the lake.

Prior to the construction of the water treatment plant, the area was the site of Victoria Park, a waterfront amusement park that operated from 1878 until 1906, and then the site was used by the Victoria Park Forest School until construction started in 1932. The plant is named after Roland Caldwell Harris, who was the Public Works Commissioner from 1912 to 1945. He was involved in projects including the Prince Edward Viaduct, the Mount Pleasant bridge, and the expansion of the Toronto Civic Railways' streetcar network. Known for its Art Deco style, the building is dubbed “The Palace of Purification” and was designated under the Ontario Heritage Act in 1998.

==== Island Water Treatment Plant ====
The Island Water Treatment Plant is located on the Toronto Islands. The plant was opened in 1977 with a capacity of 440 megalitres per day (120 million US gallons per day). The plant produces approximately 20% of Toronto's drinking water. The plant sits on the site of the first water treatment plant in Toronto, which was built in the 1900s and is no longer in service. The cold, treated water produced by the plant passes through a heat exchange system, which enables Enwave's Deep Lake Water Cooling project to cool buildings across the harbour in downtown Toronto.

==== F. J. Horgan Water Treatment Plant ====
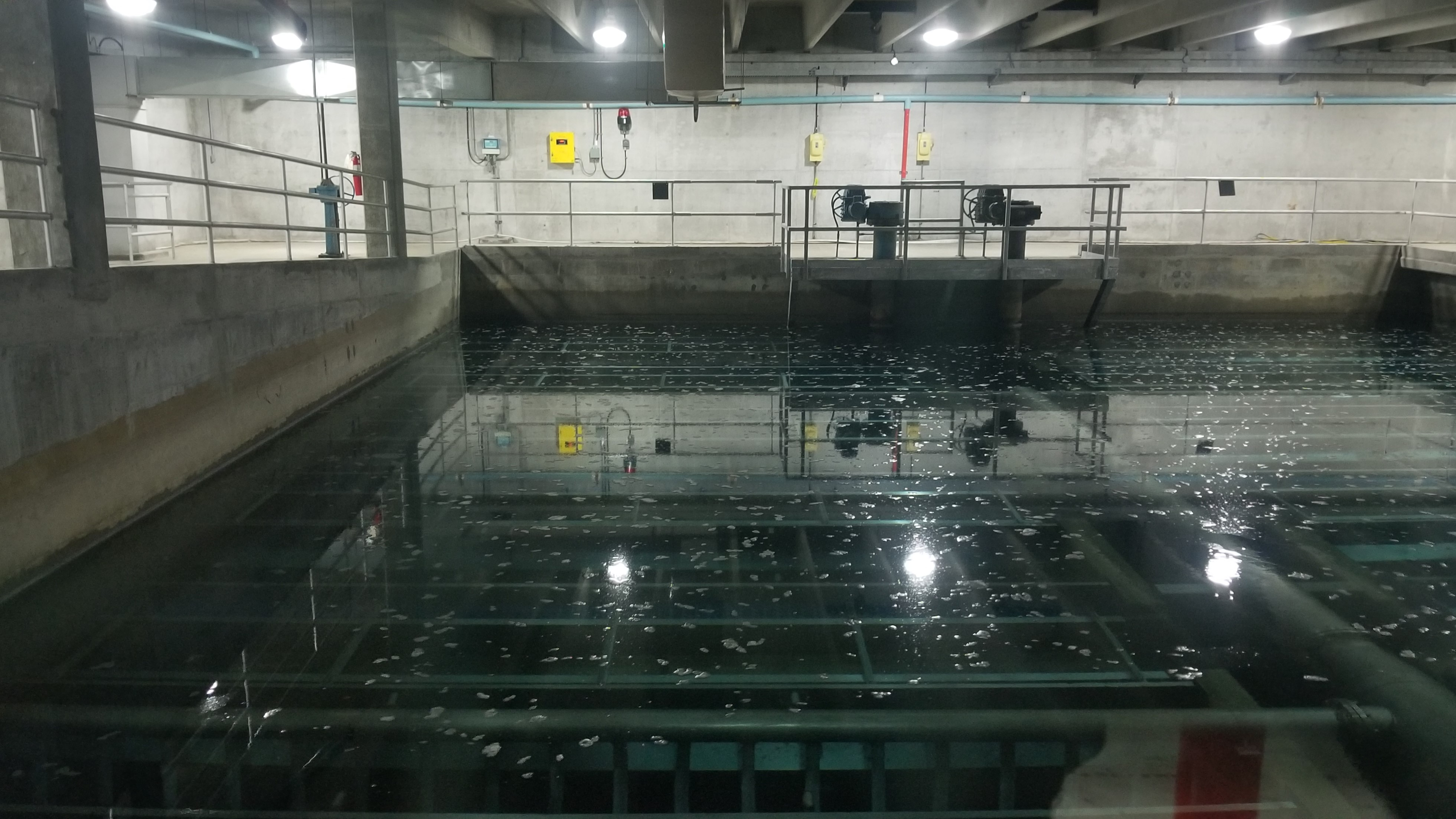
A filtration tank at the F. J. Horgan Water Treatment Plant

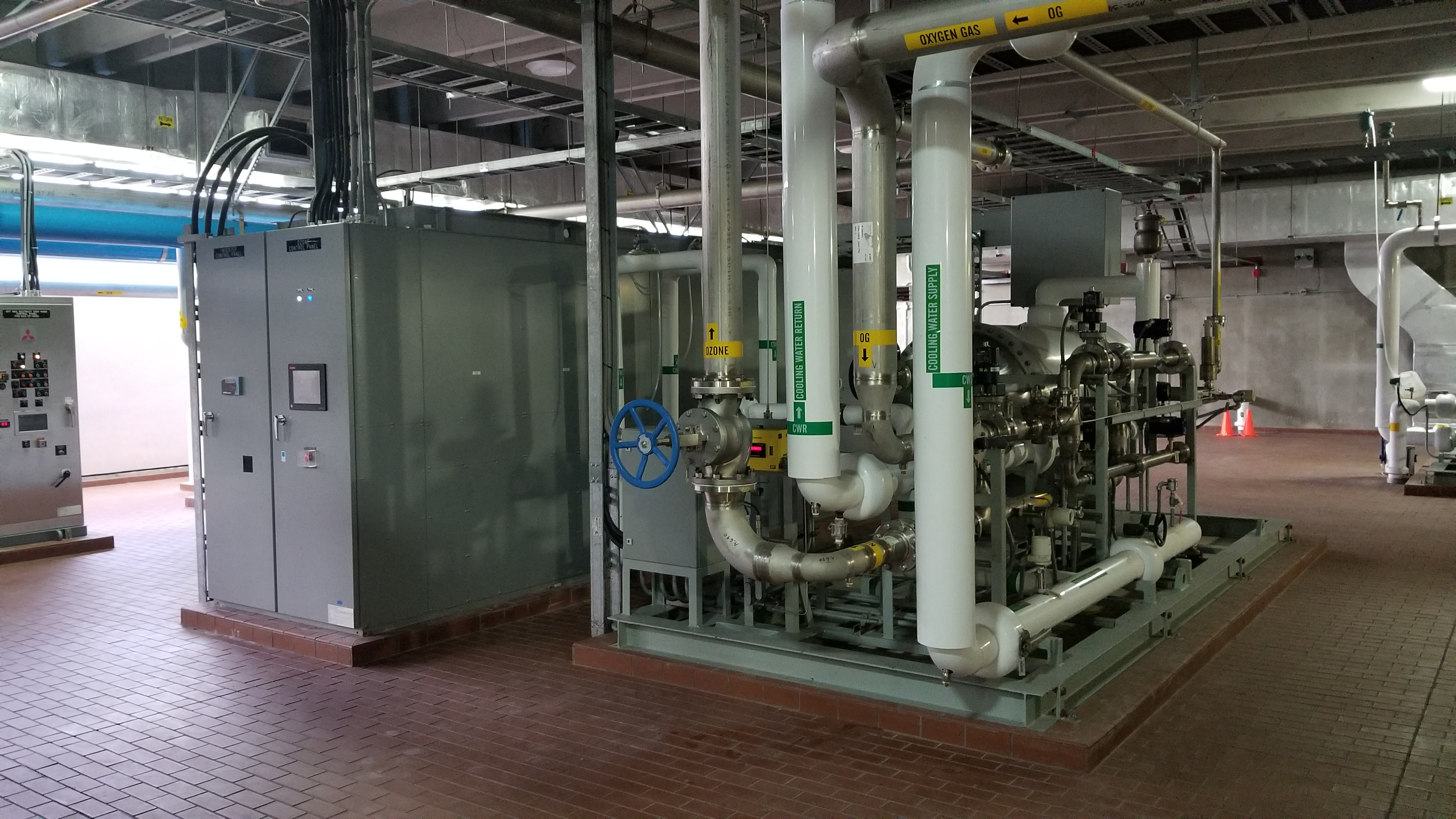
An ozone generator at the F. J. Horgan Water Treatment Plant

The F. J. Horgan Water Treatment Plant is located in Scarborough in the West Hill neighbourhood on Lake Ontario. It is the newest of Toronto's water treatment plants, being opened in 1979. With a capacity of 800 megalitres per day (210 million US gallons per day), it provides water to customers in the east end and York Region. The plant produces approximately 20% of Toronto's drinking water. The plant is named after Frank J. Horgan, the Commissioner of Works for Metro Toronto from 1980 to 1989.

In 2009, the plant was expanded by Alberici in a CA$184 million contract. The expansion included the construction of a new building with three ozone tanks, five filter boxes, and two backwash surge tanks. As of 2022, it remains the only plant in Toronto that uses ozone as the primary disinfectant to control pathogens, seasonal taste, and odour. The plant features a green roof and a 10-megawatt standby power plant to meet demand in the event of a power outage.

==== R. L. Clark Water Treatment Plant ====
The R. L. Clark Water Treatment Plant is located in Etobicoke in New Toronto on Lake Ontario. The plant was opened on November 22, 1968. It has a capacity of 615 megalitres per day (162 million US gallons per day) and produces approximately 30% of Toronto's drinking water. The plant was originally called the Westerly Plant, but it was later named after Ross Leopold Clark, the Commissioner of Works for Metropolitan Toronto from 1956 to 1979. The plant replaced the New Toronto Filtration Plant, which was opened in 1915.

=== Distribution ===
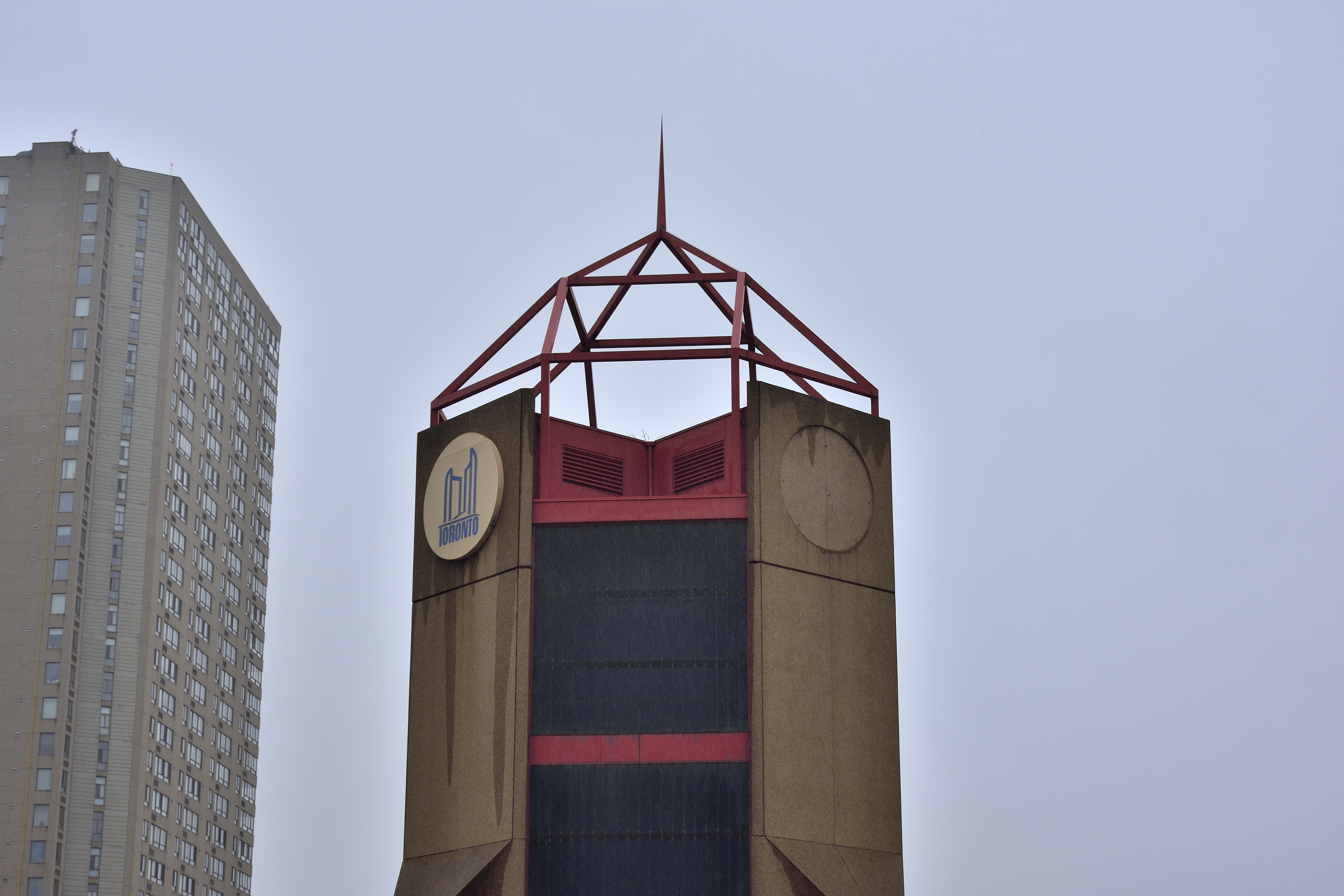
The John St Pumping Station

The drinking water distribution system operated by Toronto Water comprises 6 pressure zones and approximately 520 km of watermains (greater than 150 mm in diameter).

Pumping stations are located across the city to pump water from the filtration plants to residences. They are particularly critical since the city gains in elevation as it moves northwards away from Lake Ontario. Some pumping stations are located outside the city.

The City of Toronto operates 18 water pumping stations as of 2014:

Pumping Station	Location	Reservoir	City
Kennedy Pumping Station	South of Steeles Ave E on Kennedy Rd	—	Toronto
W.H. Johnston Pumping Station	Lawrence Ave W and Royal York Rd	—	Toronto
Armour Heights Pumping Station	Wilson Ave west of Avenue Rd	—	Toronto
West Toronto Pumping Station	South of Davenport Rd on Old Weston Rd	—	Toronto
St. Albans Pumping Station	Aukland Rd and St. Albans Rd, across from Kipling Station	—	Toronto
Lawrence Pumping Station	Lawrence Ave W and Caledonia Rd	Lawrence Reservoir	Toronto
Richview Pumping Station	North of Eglinton Ave W on Martin Grove Rd	Richview Reservoir	Toronto
High Level Pumping Station	Poplar Plains Rd, north of Dupont St and Davenport Rd	—	Toronto
Keele Pumping Station	South of Steeles Ave W on Keele St	Keele Reservoir	Toronto
Ellesmere Pumping Station	Ellesmere Rd west of Morningside Ave	Ellesmere Reservoir	Toronto
Eglinton Pumping Station	Ashtonbee Rd and Pharmacy Ave	Eglinton Reservoir	Toronto
Parkdale Pumping Station	The Queensway east of Parkside Dr	—	Toronto
Rosehill Pumping Station	Mount Pleasant Rd and Carstowe Rd	Rosehill Reservoir	Toronto
Scarborough Pumping Station	Fishleigh Drive, south of Danforth Ave E and Kingston Rd	—	Toronto
John St Pumping Station	Lake Shore Boulevard W and Rees St	—	Toronto
Bayview Pumping Station	South of Highway 407 on Bayview Ave	Bayview Reservoir	Markham
Milliken Pumping Station	East of Kennedy Rd on 14th Ave	Milliken Reservoir	Markham
Thornhill Pumping Station	Green Lane and Bayview Ave	—	Markham

=== Storage ===
Toronto water stores water in three formats:

- Floating reservoir: Newer Water tower or older Water tank with limited capacity.
- Ground level reservoir: Underground water storage with grass covered top with large capacity.
- Temporary storage: Stored at a water treatment plant with limited capacity.

Water in the city is stored once it is treated, ensuring uninterrupted water supply.

There are 4 water towers located in the city. They are mainly located in areas that cannot accommodate underground reservoirs due to space restrictions.

Name	Location
Whitlam Tank	Lake Shore Boulevard E
Leslie Tank	Leslie St and Lawrence Ave E at Talwood Drive
Rouge Tank	Sheppard Ave E near Morningside Ave
Warden Tank	Warden Ave and Civic Rd

There are 10 underground reservoirs across Toronto and in Markham:

Name	Above ground	Location	City	Ref.
Eglinton Reservoir	Ashtonbee Reservoir Park	Pharmacy Ave north of Eglinton Ave E	Toronto	
Ellesmere Reservoir	Ellesmere Reservoir Park	East of Neilson Rd and Ellesmere Rd	Toronto	
Keele Reservoir	Keele Reservoir Park	South of Steeles Ave W and Keele St	Toronto	
Lawrence Reservoir	Caledonia Park	Lawrence Ave W and Caledonia Rd	Toronto	
Rosehill Reservoir	David A. Balfour Park	Avoca Ave and St. Clair Ave E	Toronto	
Richview Reservoir	Richview Park	Martin Grove Rd and Eglinton Ave W	Toronto	
St. Clair Reservoir	Sir Winston Churchill Park	Spadina Rd and St. Clair Ave W	Toronto	
Milliken Reservoir	Milliken Mills Park	East of 14th Ave and Kennedy Rd	Markham	
Maple Reservoir	Maple Reservoir Park	South of Teston Rd and Keele St	Markham	
North Markham Reservoir	Grass-covered property	McCowan Rd and Stouffville Sideroad	Markham	
Bayview Reservoir	Bayview Reservoir Park	South of Highway 407 on Bayview Ave	Markham	
Dufferin Reservoir	Grass-covered property	Dufferin St and Autumn Hill Blvd	Vaughan	

There are in-plant temporary storage tanks storing water as well:

Name	Capacity
F. J. Horgan Water Treatment Plant	68 megalitres (18 million US gallons)
Island Water Treatment Plant	34 megalitres (9.0 million US gallons)
R. C. Harris Water Treatment Plant	54 megalitres (14 million US gallons)
R. L. Clark Water Treatment Plant	27 megalitres (7.1 million US gallons)
Scarborough Pumping Station	25 megalitres (6.6 million US gallons)

== Wastewater treatment ==
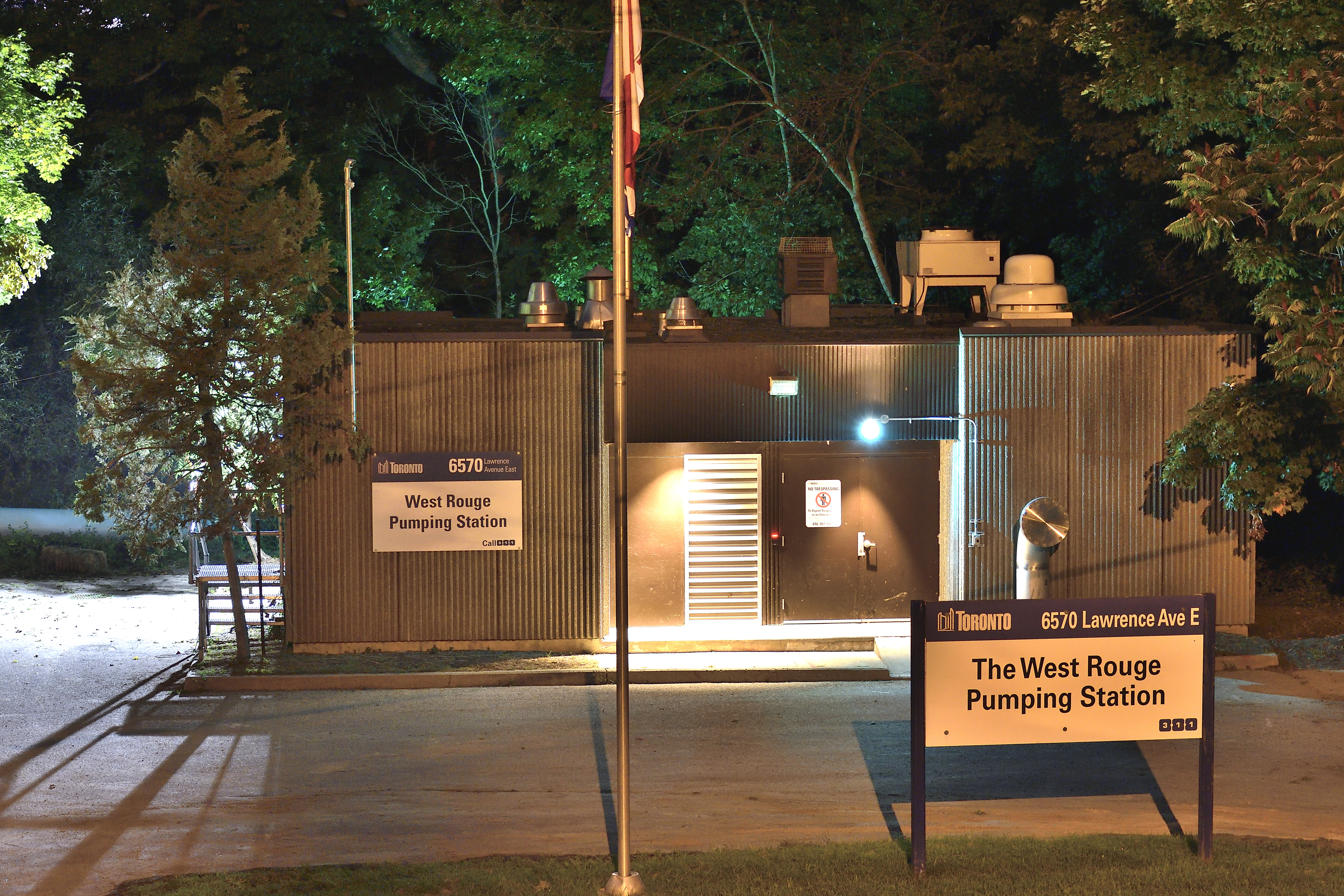
The West Rouge sewage pumping station operated by Distribution and Collection Section of Toronto Water.

=== Treatment process ===
Toronto's wastewater treatment plants treat wastewater in a 5 step process:

1. Screening
2. Git removal
3. Primary treatment
4. Secondary treatment
5. Disinfection

During screening, large objects such as rocks and sticks that get washed into the sewer system are removed. Git removal removes smaller objects like tampons, dental floss, and wipes. Primary treatment separates human waste from wastewater. Secondary treatment uses microscopic organisms to reduce and convert pollutants in the wastewater. This stage also removes nitrogen and phosphorus from the wastewater. Disinfection destroys any remaining harmful pathogens. After disinfection, the effluent wastewater meets all Ministry standards and is returned to the natural environment and reused within the facility for internal process use.

Solids removed during primary treatment and secondary treatment are pumped into digesters which allow a biological process that uses microorganisms, heat, mixing, and a 10-20 day holding time to break down complex organic matter into simpler forms. This produces methane as a byproduct. This produces biosolids, which are rich in organic material and nutrients.

=== Treatment plants ===
The City of Toronto has four facilities that process wastewater before it is returned to the lake:

Name	Opened	Location	Capacity
Ashbridges Bay Wastewater Treatment Plant	1910	43.65697°N 79.32177°W	818 ML/d (216 million US gal/d)
North Toronto Wastewater Treatment Plant	1929	43.69980°N 79.35731°W	34 ML/d (9.0 million US gal/d)
Highland Creek Wastewater Treatment Plant	1956	43.76675°N 79.15003°W	219 ML/d (58 million US gal/d)
Humber Wastewater Treatment Plant	1960	43.63316°N 79.47987°W	473 ML/d (125 million US gal/d)

==== Ashbridges Bay Wastewater Treatment Plant ====
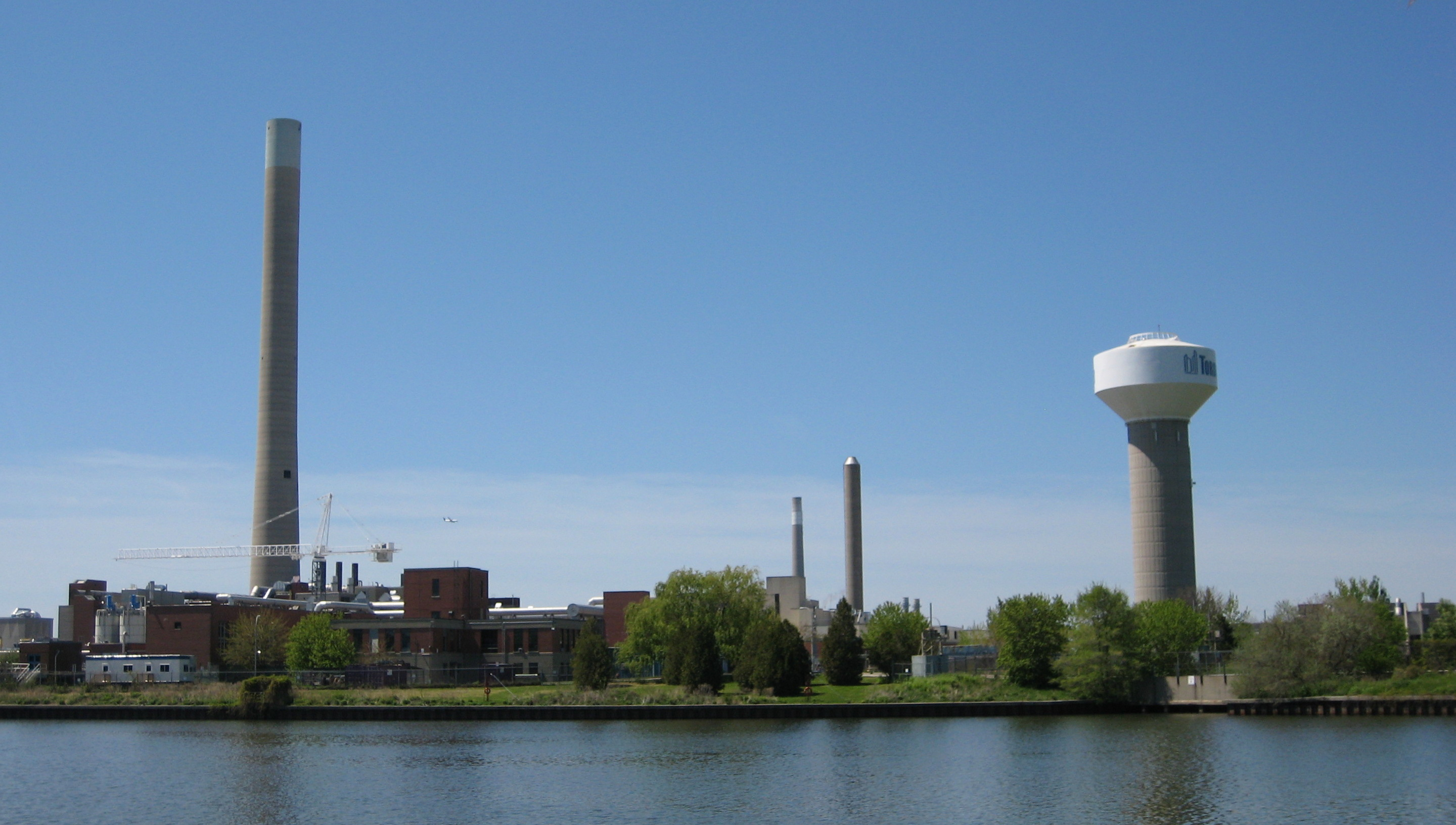
Ashbridges Bay Wastewater Treatment Plant

The Ashbridges Bay Wastewater Treatment Plant is located on the east end of the Port Lands, south of the intersection of Leslie St and Lake Shore Blvd East along Lake Ontario. The plant has a capacity of 818 megalitres per day (216 million US gallons per day), serving a population of 1.5 million. The plant began operation in 1917 and was originally called the Main Treatment Plant.

==== North Toronto Wastewater Treatment Plant ====
The North Toronto Wastewater Treatment Plant is located in the Don Valley north of the Millwood Rd over the Don Valley Parkway. The treatment plant discharges into the Don River. The plant has a capacity of 34 megalitres per day (9.0 million US gallons per day) serving a population of 55,000. The plant began operations in 1929. The plant is one of several legacy projects of Roland Caldwell Harris, the Public Works Commissioner from 1912 to 1945. The plant was partly created after North Toronto residents threatened to de-amalgamate over inadequate sewage treatment in the late 1920s.

==== Highland Creek Wastewater Treatment Plant ====
The Highland Creek Wastewater Treatment Plant is located at the mouth of Highland Creek in the West Hill neighborhood of Scarborough. The treatment plant has a capacity of 219 megalitres per day (58 million US gallons per day), which serves a population of approximately 450,000. The plant began operations in 1956. The operations of the plant, especially the handling of the 41,000 wet tonnes of biosolids the plant produces each year is an issue of concern to residents around the plant. A neighbourhood liaison committee has been established to allow residents to discuss these concerns.

==== Humber Wastewater Treatment Plant ====
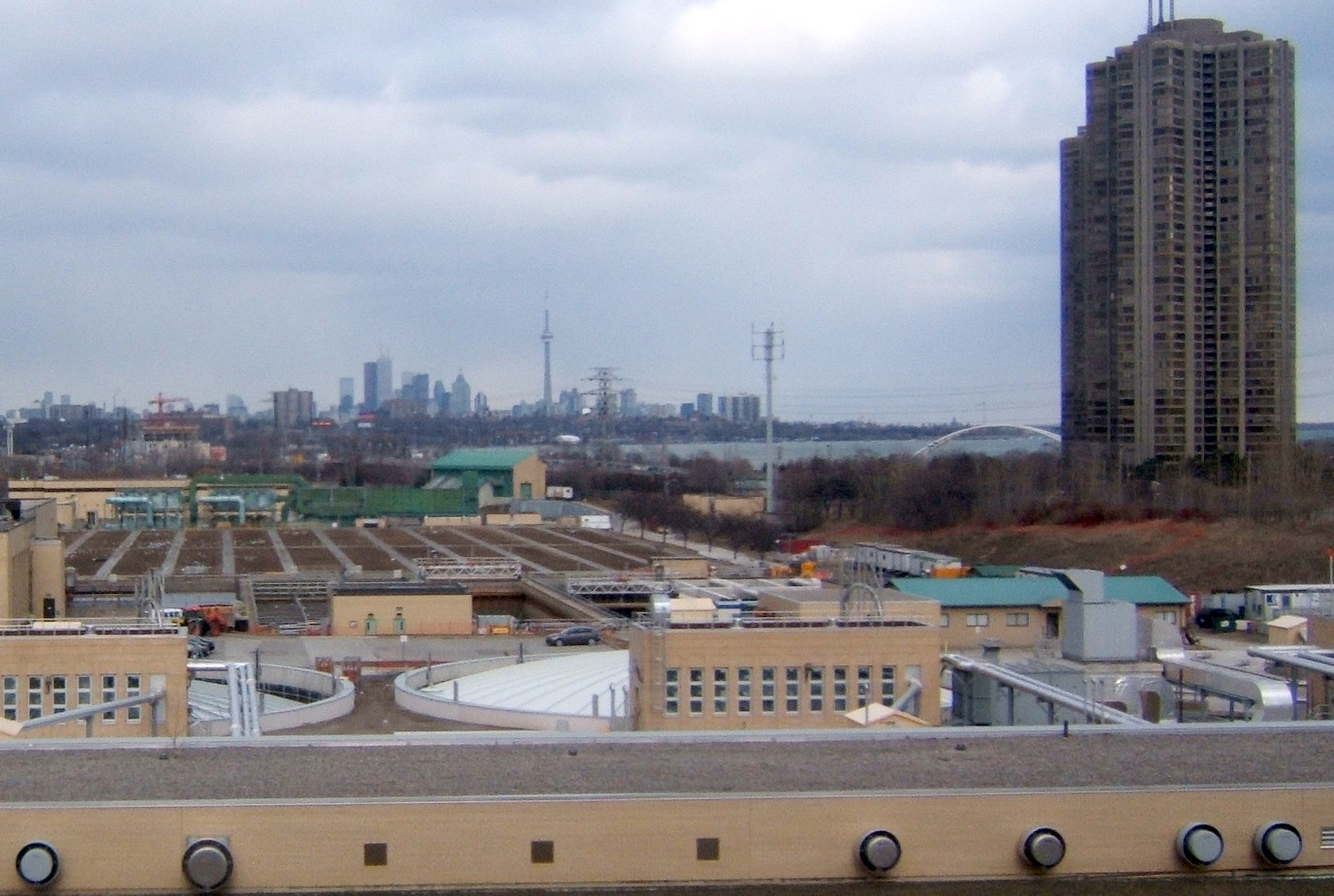
Humber Wastewater Treatment Plant

The Humber Wastewater Treatment Plant is located near the mouth of the Humber River on The Queensway. The treatment plant has a capacity of 473 megalitres per day (125 million US gallons per day), which serves a population of approximately 680,000. The plant first began operations in 1960. Local residents have been complaining about the smell produced by the plant during hotter weather. The city spent CA$64 million in 2018 to help reduce the smell produced by the plant.

=== Heavy rainfall ===
During heavy rainstorms, some excess flow which cannot be handled by the treatment plant many be diverted around some of the plant's treatment processes. As this bypass happens during storm events, the waster is mostly rain water, often with a ratio of four or five parts rain to one part sewage. These bypasses can happen at the Ashbridges Bay Wastewater Treatment Plant and the Humber Wastewater Treatment Plant, as these plants serve areas of the city with older combined sewers, which carry both sewage and stormwater to water treatment plants.

In addition to bypasses at wastewater treatment plants, the city also has detention storage facilities that can temporarily hold sewage for treatment at a later time when the treatment plants are no longer operating at full capacity. These detention facilities include the Kenilworth Ave Tank which was put into operation in 1990 and the Maclean Ave Tank which was put into operation in 1995.
