= Deep Lake Water Cooling System =

Water and air cooling project in Toronto, Canada

Location
- Country: Canada
- Province: Ontario
- Coordinates: 43.61543°N 79.38200°W

General information
- Type: Water
- Owner: Enwave
- Partners: Toronto Water
- Contractors: McNally International
- Construction started: 1997
- Commissioned: August 17, 2004

Technical information
- Length: 5 km (3.1 mi)
- Maximum discharge: 453 Million Litres Per Day (Raw Water) 440 Million Litres Per Day (Potable Water)
- Diameter: 1,600 mm (63 in)
- Pumping stations: Toronto Island Water Treatment Plant - Raw Water Pumping Station, John Street Pumping Station and Energy Transfer Station.

Deep Lake Water Cooling Expansion (4th Intake)

Location
- Country: Canada
- Province: Ontario

General information
- Type: Raw Water
- Owner: Enwave
- Partners: Toronto Water
- Contractors: C&M McNally, Dean Construction
- Construction started: 2021
- Commissioned: 2024

Technical information
- Length: 3.3 km (2.1 mi)
- Maximum discharge: 251 Million Litres Per Day
- Diameter: 1,600 mm (63 in)
- Pumping stations: John Street Pumping Station Lake Water Pumps

The Deep Lake Water Cooling System or DLWC is a deep water source cooling project in Toronto, Canada. As a renewable energy project, it involves running cold water from Lake Ontario to air-conditioned buildings located in downtown Toronto.

The DLWC was built by Enwave, and opened August 17, 2004. Notable clients include Toronto-Dominion Centre, Royal Bank Plaza, RBC Centre, Metro Toronto Convention Centre, University Health Network, and Scotiabank Arena.

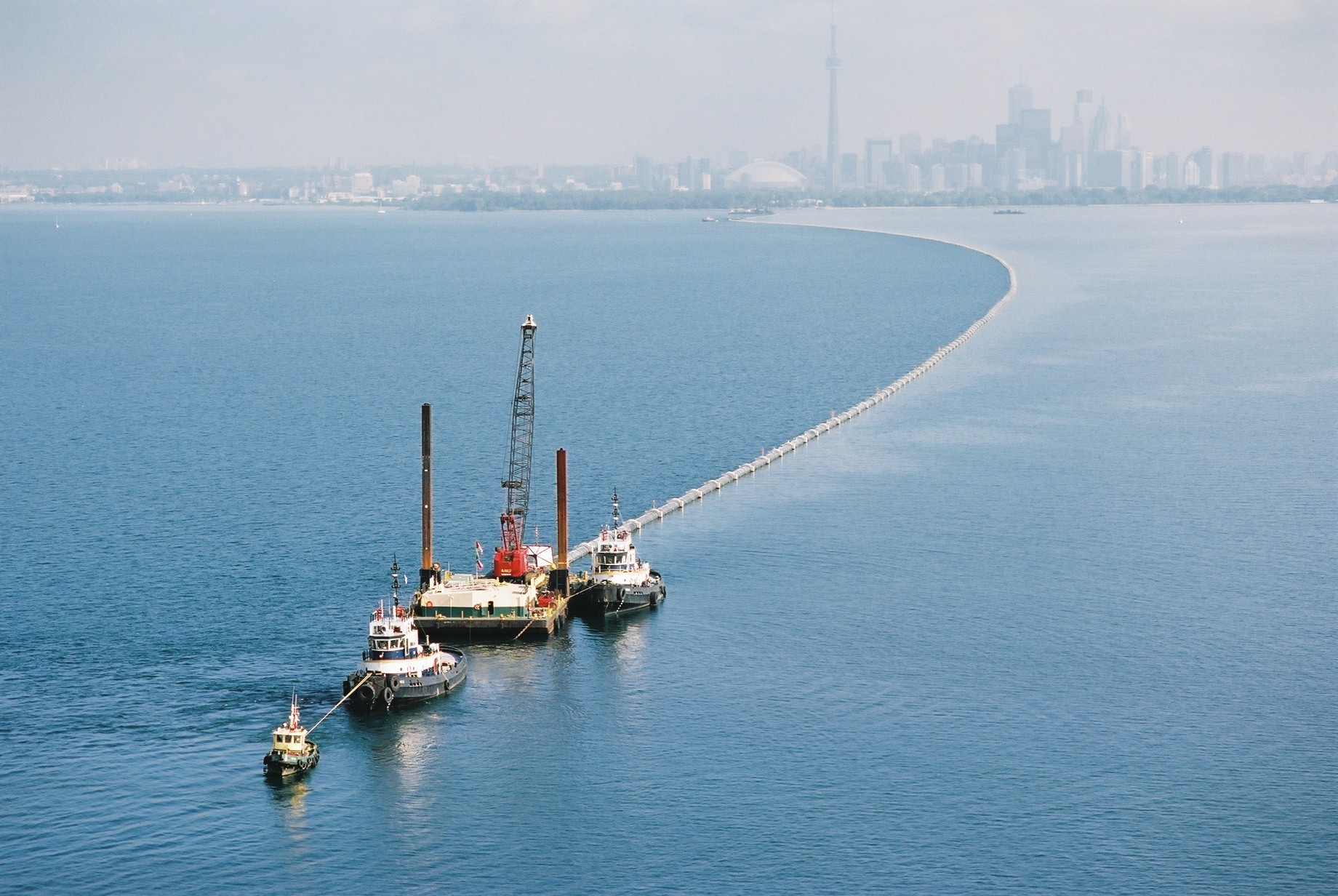
Deep Lake Water Cooling Pipeline Installation

Compared to traditional air-conditioning, DLWC reduces electricity use by 90,000 megawatt hours (80% reduction) and water consumption by and 832 million liters per year. It also reduces carbon dioxide production by 40,000 metric tonnes annually.

== Development ==
An Environmental Assessment and design of the DLWC was completed by R.V. Anderson Associates Limited starting in 1997. Pre-construction was funded by the Federation of Canadian Municipalities, and began in 1997. It was officially launched on August 17, 2004, at Steam Whistle Brewing, one of Enwave's customers. The launch was attended by actor Alec Baldwin, Ontario Minister of Energy Dwight Duncan, Canadian Minister of Human Resources and Skills Development Joe Volpe, and Toronto Deputy Mayor Sandra Bussin. The launch coincided with the anniversary of the 2003 blackout.

== Mechanism ==
The DLWC involves three large HDPE pipes running 5 kilometres into Lake Ontario at a depth of 83 metres. An expansion to the system added a fourth intake pipe that extends 3.3 kilometres into Lake Ontario to a depth of 70 metres.

Lake Ontario is a thermally stratified lake which contains a thermocline. The bottommost layer, referred to as the hypolimnion, is composed of cold, dense water, which remains at a constant 4 °C (39 °F). The water is piped to the Toronto Island Water Treatment Plant for potable water treatment, then to the John Street Pumping Station, where an Energy Transfer Station is located, which contains a series of plate and frame heat exchangers. These are used to transfer heat between the potable water and a closed chilled water loop. This chilled water is then circulated within a district energy distribution system to supply buildings with cooling, then returned to the Energy Transfer Station. The potable water is supplied to the municipal drinking water system. Built at a cost of C$230m ($200m) over four years, the system is run by the Enwave Energy Corporation.

Cold lake water is pumped through the source side of heat exchangers situated at Toronto's John Street Pumping Station while a chilled water mixture is circulated through the load circuit of the heat exchanger, allowing for a net energy transfer from the lake water/chilled water mixture to the lake water. The chilled water mixture is then circulated using pumps throughout fan-coil units installed in high-rise properties throughout the region served by Enwave in Downtown Toronto where it absorbs energy and repeats the cycle to provide cooling and dehumidification. This system is advantageous since it reduces, or even completely eradicates chiller usage during summer months and shoulder seasons, reducing energy usage, as well as minimizing the number of evaporative cooling towers from operating, which are susceptible to becoming breeding grounds for Legionella pneumophila.

== Expansion ==
In 2018, a Deep Lake Water Cooling Expansion program was initiated to increase the system capacity. An Environmental Assessment and design of the DLWC was completed by R.V. Anderson Associates Limited starting in 2020. Construction commenced in 2021 and was commissioned in 2024. The expansion consists of an additional fourth intake pipeline that is 3.3 km long, and goes to a depth of 70 m, a new tunnel and shaft conveyance system from Toronto Island to the John Street Pumping Station that is 3 km long and is located 90 m below ground surface, new pumps and heat exchangers at the John Street Pumping Station, as well as conveyance and system upgrades to other downstream systems.

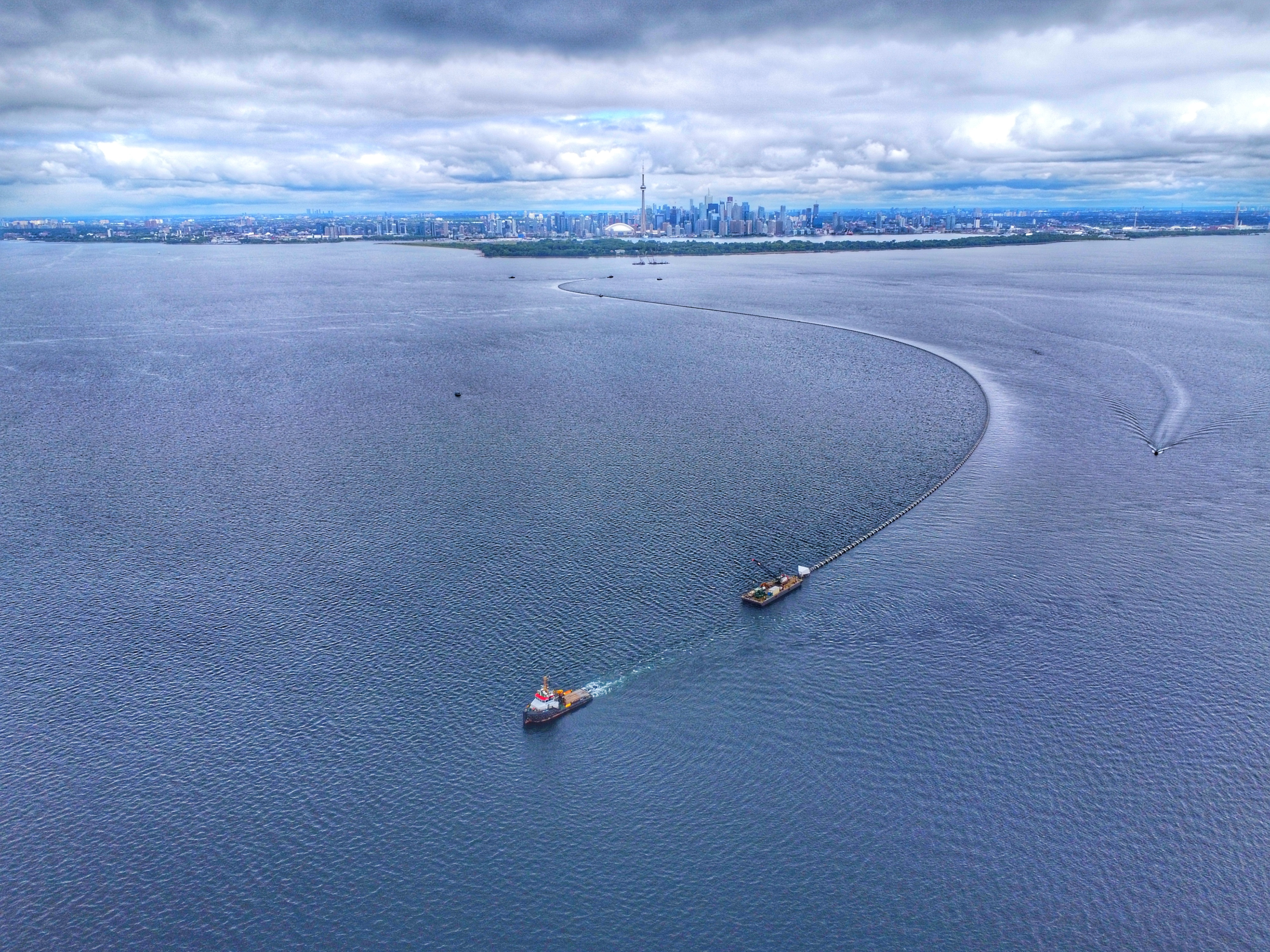
4th Intake Installation

The expansion increased the system capacity by 251 million litres per day for a total deep lake water cooling raw water capacity of 704 million litres per day.

== See also ==
- Ashbridges Bay Wastewater Treatment Plant
- Toronto Water
- Enwave
