= 1903 Toronto municipal election =

Municipal elections were held in Toronto, Ontario, Canada, on January 5, 1903. In the mayoral election, Alderman Thomas Urquhart defeated incumbent Mayor Oliver Aiken Howland, who was attempting to win a third term in office. Urquhart's platform included operating the telephone and gas systems under city management. Urquhart had the support of the Toronto Trades and Labour Council. Alderman Lamb came in third.

(Later, in 1903 the Ontario legislature passed a law requiring municipal boards of control to be chosen through direct election by the municipality's voters. This law came into effect for the Toronto city administration in the January 1904 election.)

== Toronto mayor ==
Results
Alderman Thomas Urquhart - 8,634
Oliver Aiken Howland (incumbent) - 7,887
Alderman Daniel Lamb - 6,473
Christopher C. Robinson - 914
Charles Christopher Woodley - 428

Source: and

== Board of Control ==
1903 was the last year in which the Toronto Board of Control, the executive body of Toronto City Council was not directly elected. At the first council meeting following the general election, council chose Aldermen Loudon, Oliver, Burns and Richardson to sit on the body, which was chaired by the Mayor.

== Plebiscites ==
A plebiscite was held on a by-law to authorize expenditure on a modern pumping engine for the city's waterworks

Waterworks by-law
For - 5,615
Against - 2,730

== City council ==
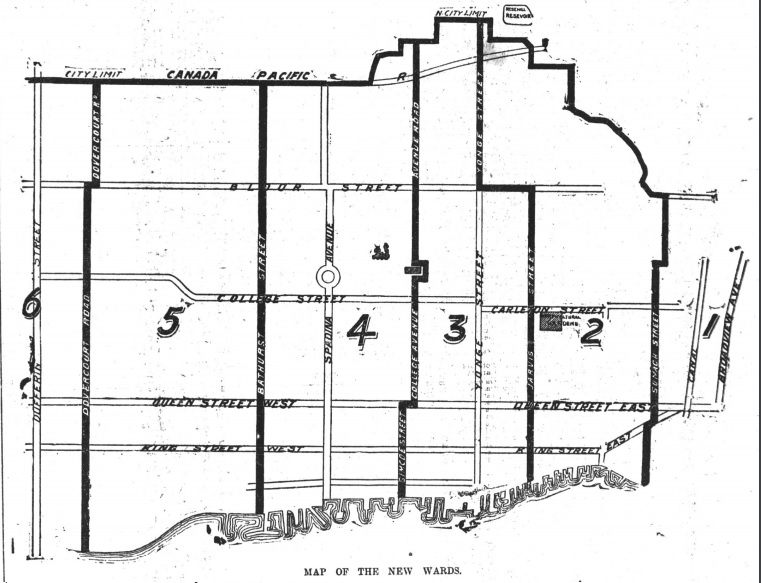
Map of Toronto's six wards (1892-1909), published in The Globe, 1 January 1892.

Four aldermen were elected to Toronto City Council in each of six wards. Former mayor John Shaw attempted to win an aldermanic seat in the Third Ward, but was defeated.

First Ward (Riverdale)
William Temple Stewart (incumbent) - 1,518
Daniel Chisholm - 1,515
Robert Fleming (incumbent) - 1,407
Fred H. Richardson (incumbent) - 1,255
John Preston - 1,100

Second Ward (Cabbagetown and Rosedale)
Frank S. Spence (incumbent) - 1,932
Joseph Oliver (incumbent) - 1,883
Dr. John Noble - 1,781
Thomas Foster (incumbent) - 1,583
Edward Strachan Cox - 1,426
David Carlyle - 1,136
Thomas Davies - 624
W.A. Douglass - 594
Frederick Hogg - 585

Third Ward (Central Business District and The Ward)
John F. Loudon (incumbent) - 2,814
Oliver Barton Sheppard (incumbent) - 2,788
Joseph George Ramsden- 2,356
Samuel George Curry (incumbent) - 2,154
George McMurrich (incumbent) - 2,035
John Shaw - 1,968
John Patterson - 196

Fourth Ward (Spadina)
William Burns (incumbent) -2,770
William Peyton Hubbard (incumbent) - 2,585
Dr. William S. Harrison - 2,582
Stephen Wellesley Burns - 2,469
Alex R. Williamson - 1,731
Lieut-Col. Norman F. Paterson - 1,535
Edmund Schilling - 258

Fifth Ward (Trinity-Bellwoods)
James Russell Lovett Starr - 2,508
John Dunn (incumbent) - 2,435
William Bell (incumbent) - 1,958
Frank Woods (incumbent) - 1,864
Peter Whytock - 1,594
Alexander Stewart (incumbent) - 1,353
M.J. Mallaney - 391

Sixth Ward (Brockton and Parkdale)
James Henry McGhie - 1,999
Jonn Joseph Ward (incumbent) - 1,736
John James Graham (incumbent) - 1,696
Dr. Adam Lynd (incumbent) - 1,359
J.H. Hall (incumbent) - 1,238

Source: and
