= South Hill, Toronto =

Coordinates: 43°40′52″N 79°24′14″W

South Hill
- Neighbourhood
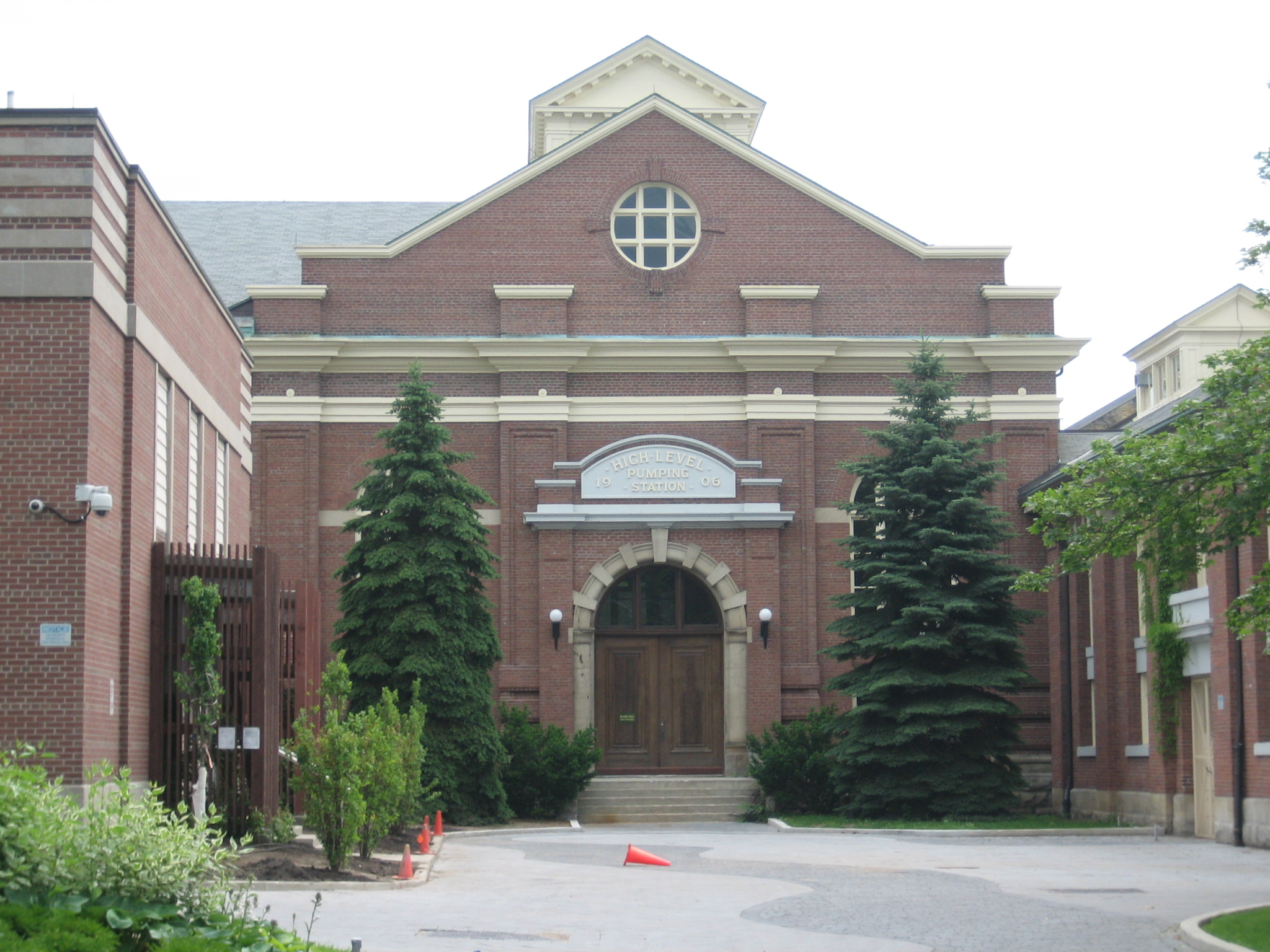
- The High Level Pumping Station in South Hill

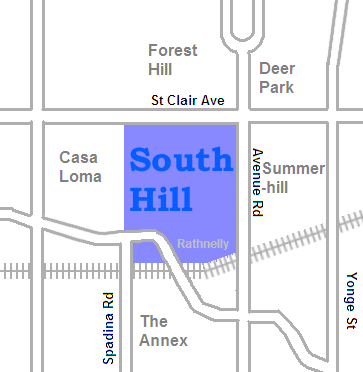
- Location of South Hill
- Country: Canada
- Province: Ontario
- City: Toronto

South Hill is a neighbourhood in Toronto, Ontario, Canada. It is located north of downtown and covers the area west of Avenue Road, south of St. Clair Avenue, east of Spadina Road, and north of the Canadian Pacific railway tracks. The area is dominated by the steep hill of the Davenport Road escarpment. The Nordheimer Ravine also cuts through the area, which is surrounded by Sir Winston Churchill Park. This park covers the northwestern portion of South Hill.

== History ==
The first settlers of York, Upper Canada, divided the area that would become South Hill into concessions in 1793. One large section of the area went to Peter Russell, and Russell Hill Road continues to run through the centre of the neighbourhood.

In the late nineteenth century, the area became home to some of the wealthiest citizens of Toronto. They built a series of large manors along the top of the hill. These included Senator John Macdonald's Oaklands, the Eaton family's Ardwold, Samuel Nordheimer's Glenedyth, James Austin's Spadina, Senator William McMaster's Rathnelly, and most prominently Sir Henry Pellatt's Casa Loma.

The area was annexed to the city of Toronto in a series of sections beginning in 1905. It has remained an expensive residential area, though most of the large manors have today either been demolished or converted to other uses.

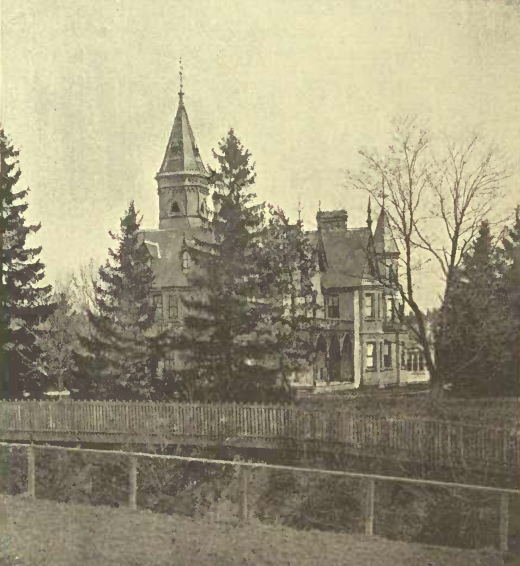
The Oaklands estate in South Hill, c. 1891

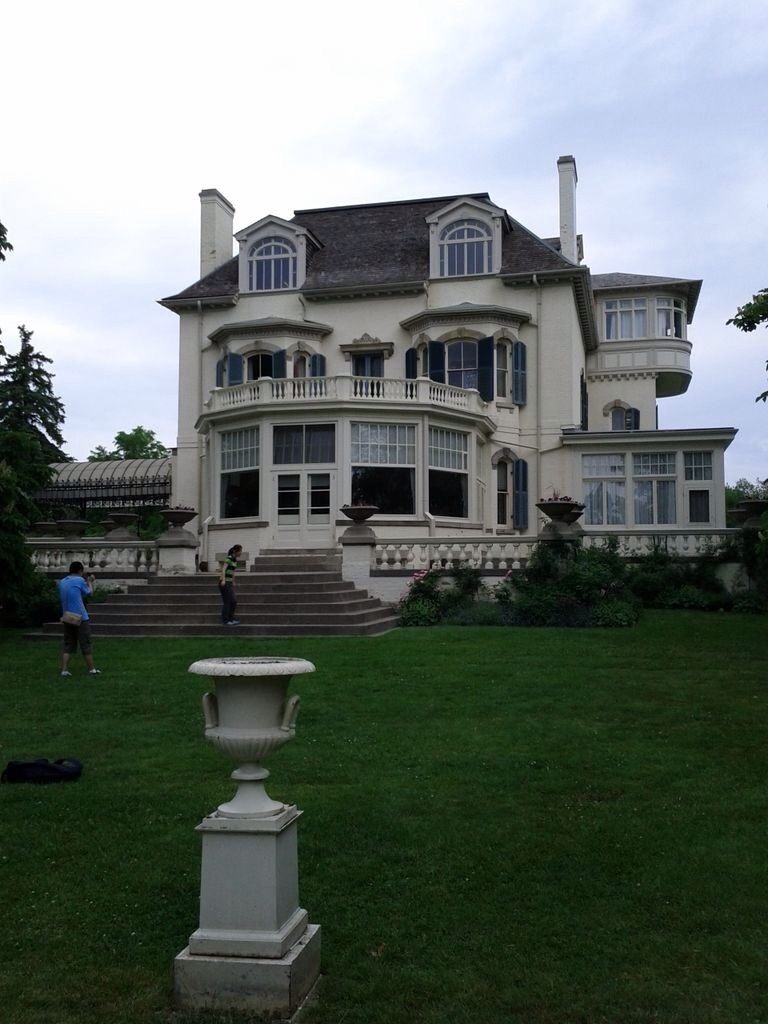
Spadina House, now a historic house museum

== Republic of Rathnelly ==
The southeastern section of South Hill is known as Rathnelly. It takes its name from the former "Rathnelly" house built in 1830 by William McMaster, which was named after his birthplace in Rathnelly, Ireland. Civil unrest in the neighbourhood was fomented by municipal plans to develop an expressway through the area as well as due to zoning off of a park in the neighbourhood exclusively for city workers.

During the Canadian Centennial celebration on July 1, 1967, the Rathnelly neighbourhood declared itself an independent republic. To mark its independence, the "Republic of Rathnelly" elected a queen, organized a parade, formed an "air force" of 1,000 helium balloons, and issued Republic of Rathnelly passports to everyone in the neighbourhood. The Republic of Rathnelly continues to celebrate with a biennial street party in June, referred to as "Rathnelly Day".

== Landmarks ==
- Baldwin Steps
- High Level Pumping Station
- Spadina House
