= Camroden Presbyterian Church =

Historic church in New York, United States

- U.S. National Register of Historic Places
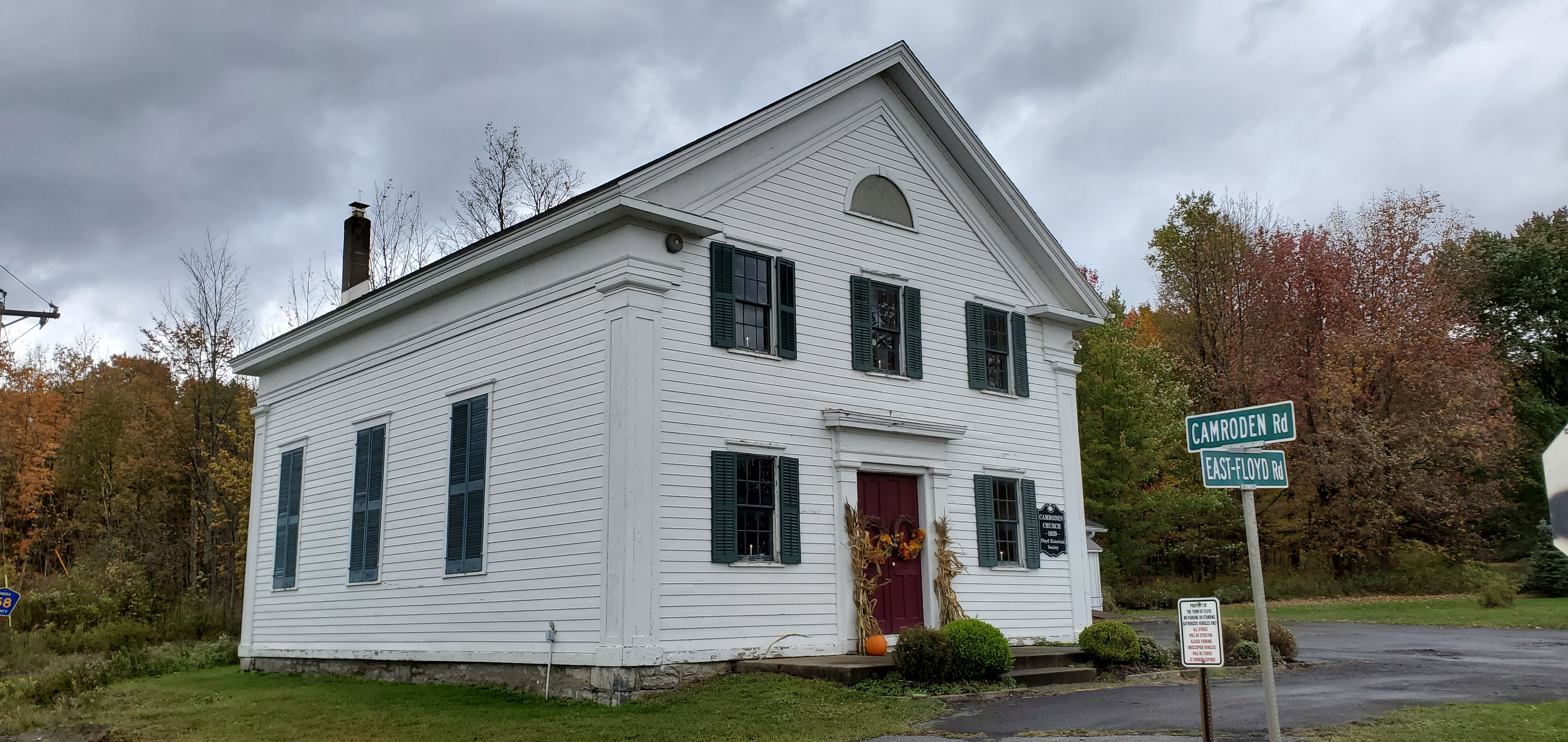
- Camroden Presbyterian Church, October 2020

- Location within New York Location within the United States
- Location: East Floyd Rd., Rome, NY
- Coordinates: 43.2531°N 75.3554°W
- Area: less than one acre
- Architect: John J. Vaughan, Humphrey Williams
- Architectural style: Greek Revival
- NRHP reference No.: 06001204
- Added to NRHP: January 4, 2007

Camroden Presbyterian Church is a historic Presbyterian church in Floyd, Oneida County, New York. It was built in 1863–1864 and is a rectangular timber framed, gable roofed building measuring 43 by 32 feet. It features vernacular Greek Revival details.

It was listed on the National Register of Historic Places in 2007.
