= Ashbridges Bay Wastewater Treatment Plant =

Sewage treatment facility for Toronto, Canada

Coordinates: 43.658185°N 79.320431°W

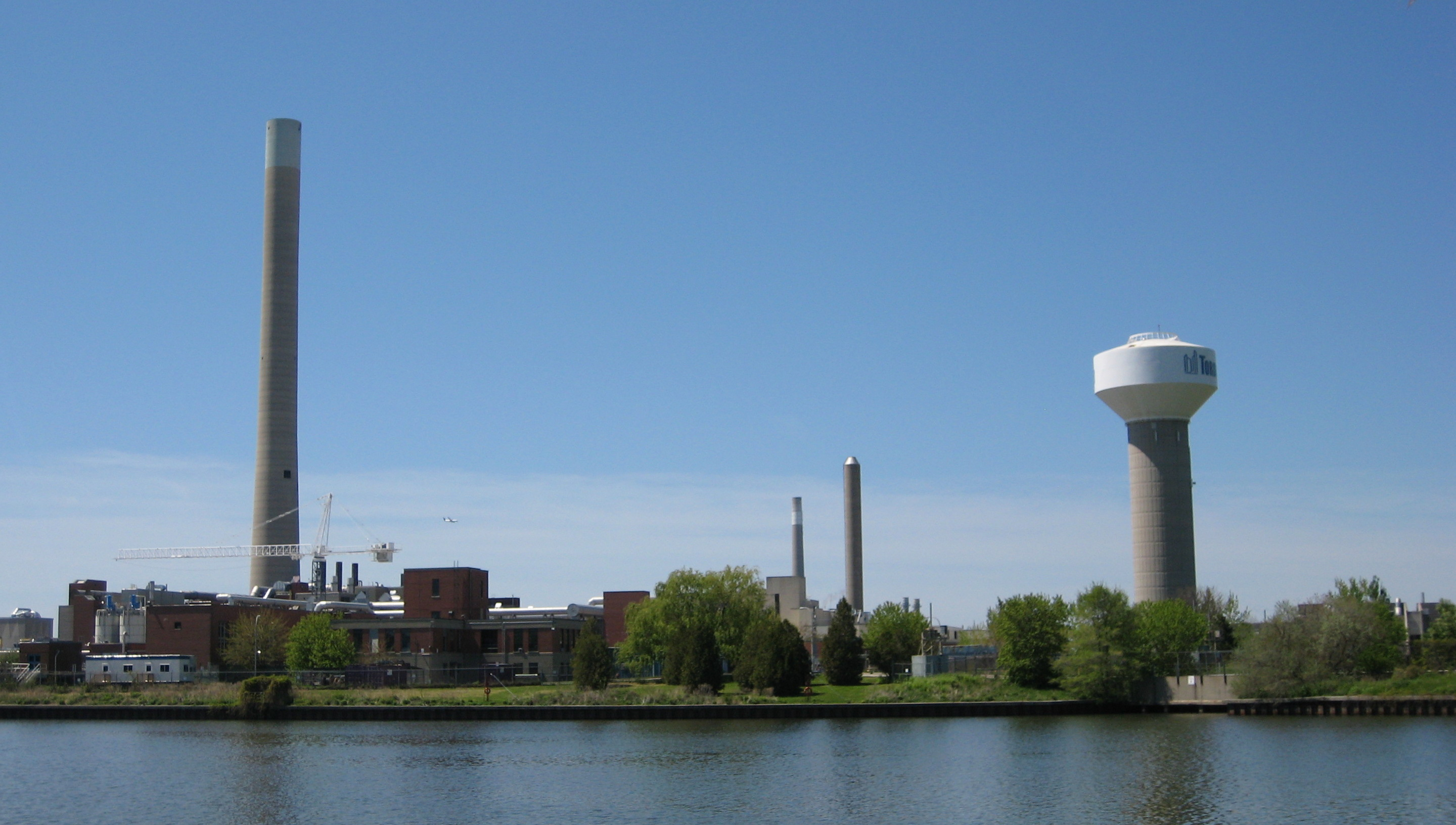
Ashbridges Bay Wastewater Treatment Plant

The Ashbridges Bay Wastewater Treatment Plant is the city of Toronto's main sewage treatment facility, and the second largest such plant in Canada after Montreal's Jean-R. Marcotte facility. One of four plants that service the city of Toronto, it treats the wastewater produced by some 1.4 million of the city's residents and has a rated capacity of 818,000 (design capacity of 1,000,000) cubic metres per day. Until 1999 it was officially known as the Main Treatment Plant. The plant has a 185 m (607 ft) high smokestack which is visible from most parts of the city.

The plant opened in 1910. Prior to this, Toronto's sewage flowed directly into Lake Ontario and a layer of thick sludge covered the lake to a distance of several hundred feet from shore. The lake was also the source of the city's drinking water and the pollution contributed to a major typhoid outbreak.

The plant is located on the shore of Lake Ontario at the foot of Leslie Street at Ashbridge's Bay. To the west is the Port Lands area, a once heavily industrial area that is now mostly deserted. To the north is the Leslieville neighbourhood. When the plant was built, it was on the eastern edge of the city, far away from most residents. It is now surrounded by residential areas and strenuous efforts have been made to reduce odours and pollution. Most notable was the shuttering of the plant's incinerators in 1987. An odour control study was completed in 2002 and, beginning in 2002, the area around the plant was also redesigned into a large landscaped park. In 2005, a contract was awarded to design and construct a new odour control system.

Until recently, all the sludge has been trucked off site. However, summer 2007 saw odour problems, with the Michigan landfill closed and the city removing only 6 of every 10 truckloads of sludge produced, leaving the rest in an aeration slough until autumn when agricultural applications for sludge resumed.

== Future Development ==
As of 2020, the City of Toronto is undertaking several projects to prevent combined sewer overflows and improve water quality in the lower Don river, Taylor-Massey creek and Toronto harbour, with implications for Ashbridges Bay Treatment Plant. About a quarter of Toronto's current sewer system consists of combined sewers, where both raw sewage and stormwater are carried within shared pipes. Many of these sewers date back more than a century. Combined sewers periodically release untreated wastewater into Toronto's waterways and Lake Ontario causing pollution, especially during periods of increased rainfall or snowmelt. The overall budget for the projects is $3 Billion CAD, representing the largest stormwater management program in Toronto's history. Since 1987, Toronto's waterfront has been identified by a Canada/US Joint International Commission as one of 43 "Areas of Concern" in the Great Lakes Basin, largely due to impaired water quality and sediment conditions in the Don river watershed and Toronto's inner harbour.

=== Don River and Central Waterfront (DR&CW) Wet Weather Flow System ===
The DR&CW project will capture wastewater from combined sewers across the city and divert it to Ashbridges Bay Treatment Plant for treatment and discharge into Lake Ontario, diverting and virtually eliminating all discharge into the Don river, Taylor-Massey creek and Toronto harbour. At buildout, this project is planned to consist of an integrated system of 22km of tunnels, 12 wet-weather-flow storage shafts, 7 off-line storage tanks, real-time sewage flow control and 27 connection points to the city's existing sewer system. The first phase, commonly referred to as the Coxwell Bypass Tunnel, is a 10.5km long, 6.3m diameter tunnel that will run in the vicinity of the Don river valley and Lakeshore Boulevard East from near the north end of Coxwell Avenue to Ashbridges Bay Treatment Plant. The project will also add backup capacity and allow periodic maintenance of the existing Coxwell Sanitary Trunk Sewer, a vital sewer main which currently carries approximately 75 percent of the city's wastewater to Ashbridges Bay Treatment Plant. Phase 1 construction started in 2018 and is expected to be complete by 2024. Planned future phases include the Taylor-Massey creek and Inner Harbour West tunnels, to be completed pending funding and regulatory approval.

=== Integrated Pumping Station ===
Ashbridges Bay Treatment Plant is currently serviced by 2 pumping stations located north of the plant across Lakeshore Blvd. on lands occupied by the Main Sewage Treatment Playground. Constructed in 1919 and the 1970s, they are planned to be replaced by a new pumping station located south of Lakeshore Blvd. within the Treatment Plant property. The new pumping station will receive existing flow as well as flow from the new DR&CW tunnel system, and will provide additional capacity for future population growth. Construction began in 2018 and is expected to conclude in 2026.

=== Ashbridges Bay Landform Project ===
A joint initiative between the City of Toronto and the Toronto Region Conservation Authority (TRCA), the landform project involves the construction of new landforms south of the plant in Ashbridges Bay using the material removed from the DR&CW tunnelling projects. The new landforms will provide improved sediment and erosion control in Ashbridges Bay, improving boat access and eliminating the need for regular dredging of the Coatsworth Cut area of the bay. Part of the reclaimed lands will also be the site of a new high-rate treatment facility, designed specifically to treat wastewater intercepted from combined sewers by the DR&CW tunnels. Construction began in 2019 and is expected to conclude in 2025.

=== UV (ultraviolet) Disinfection Wastewater Treatment System ===
A new disinfection system using UV (ultraviolet) lights will be built south of the current plant. The new system will replace the current chlorine-based disinfection system, and will treat sewage without the use of chemicals, instead using "Next-Generation UV lamp technology" which the city claims is "more energy efficient and requires less space than conventional UV lamps." The system will include sodium hypochlorite disinfection and dechlorination as a backup for treating excessive flows caused by extreme rainfall. Construction began in 2018 and is expected to be complete in 2022.

=== New Outfall ===
The plant's outfall is the point where treated water is released and dispersed into Lake Ontario. The current outfall pipe, built in the late 1940s, will be replaced by a new larger pipe that extends further into the lake to increase capacity and improve dispersal of treated water. The new 7m-diameter outfall pipe will extend 3.5km into the lake, and will be mined through bedrock from an on-shore vertical shaft that extends 85m into the ground. 50 underwater risers connecting to the outfall pipe will be drilled from on-water barges, and will disperse the treated and disinfected effluent into Lake Ontario. Construction began in 2018 and is expected to be complete in 2024.

== See also ==
- R. C. Harris Water Treatment Plant
- Toronto Water
- Deep Lake Water Cooling System
