= Floyd, New York =

- Town
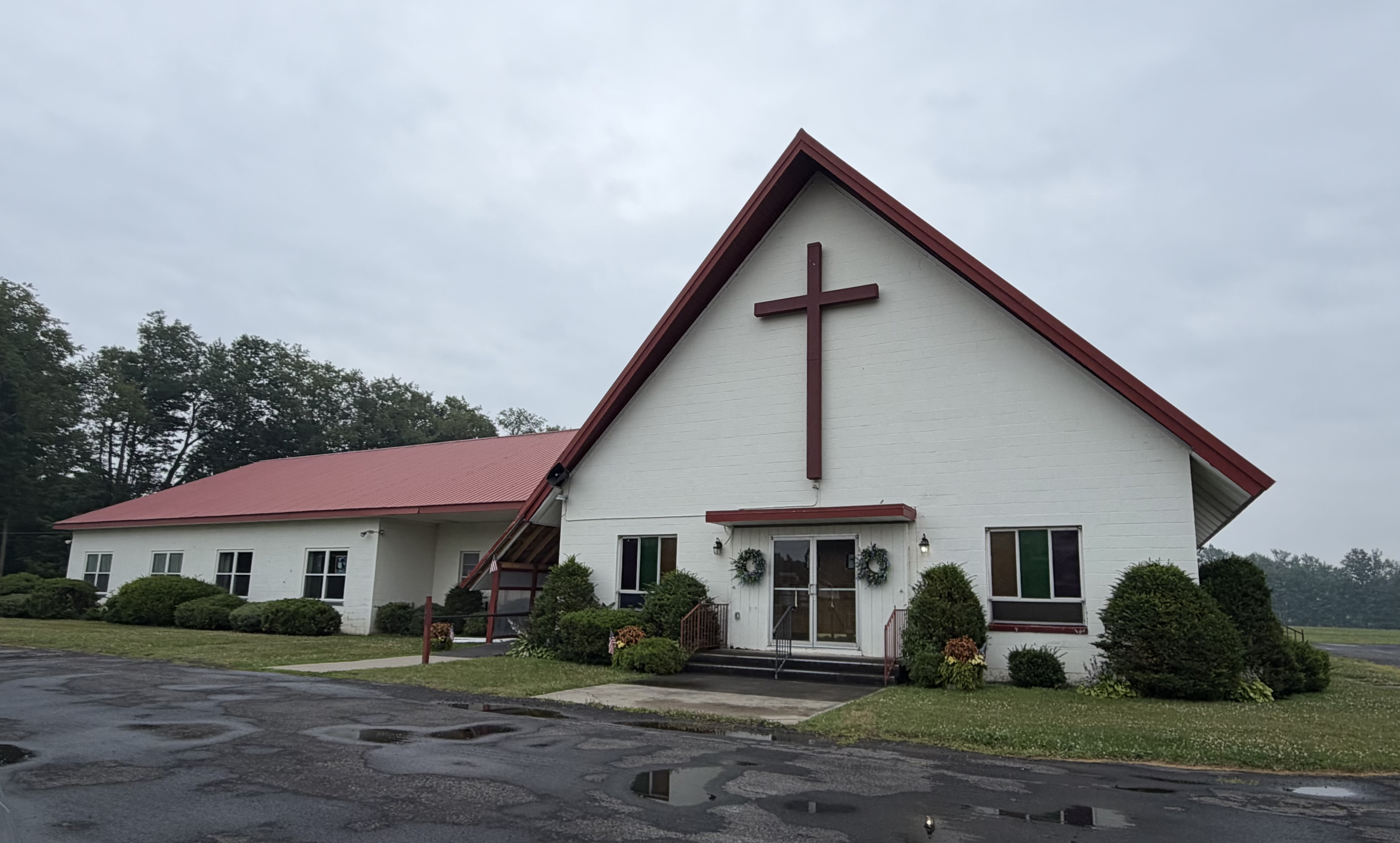
- Floyd Methodist Church

- Location in Oneida County and the state of New York.
- Coordinates: 43°13′31″N 75°19′54″W
- Country: United States
- State: New York
- County: Oneida

Government
  - Type: Town Council
  - Town Supervisor: Willard H. Strieff(R)
  - Town Council: Members' List: • William E. Smith (R); • Clifford Kotary (R); • Willard H. Streiff, Jr. (R); • Charles E. Planow (R)

Area
  - Total: 34.79 sq mi (90.11 km^{2})
  - Land: 34.62 sq mi (89.66 km^{2})
  - Water: 0.17 sq mi (0.45 km^{2})
- Elevation: 889 ft (271 m)

Population (2010)
  - Total: 3,819
  - Estimate (2016): 3,776
  - Density: 109.1/sq mi (42.12/km^{2})
- Time zone: UTC-5 (Eastern (EST))
  - Summer (DST): UTC-4 (EDT)
- ZIP Code: 13440 (Rome); 13354 (Holland Patent); 13469 (Stittville); 13403 (Marcy)
- Area code: 315
- FIPS code: 36-26385
- GNIS feature ID: 0978962
- Website: Town website

Floyd is a town in Oneida County, New York, United States. The population was 3,733 at the 2020 census and 3,819 at the 2010 census. The town is named after William Floyd, a signer of the Declaration of Independence.

The Town of Floyd is located east of the City of Rome and the former Griffiss Air Force Base.

The Erie Canal passes along the southern part of the town.

== History ==
The area was first settled around 1790. The Town of Floyd was founded in 1796 from the Town of Steuben. William Floyd, for whom the town is named, became a resident of Oneida County in 1794.

The population of Floyd was 1,227 in 1865 but only 663 in 1920.

In the 19th century, Floyd was known for "Masonic, scholarly, political and anti-slavery activities."

The Camroden Presbyterian Church was listed on the National Register of Historic Places in 2007.

The town was briefly mentioned in the 1996 film "City Hall," in which the two main characters are stuck in Floyd while waiting for snow to clear off the train tracks.

== Geography ==
According to the United States Census Bureau, the town has a total area of 34.8 square miles (90 km^{2}), of which 34.6 square miles (90 km^{2}) is land and 0.2 square miles (0.52 km^{2}) (0.46%) is water.

The Mohawk River defines the southern town line. The town has rolling hills ascending to the north, which reach about 200–300 feet above the river. Nine Mile Creek, which flows through the southeast part of the town, was originally known as Te-ya-nun-sak, or Teyanunsoke, "a beech tree standing."

== Demographics ==
Historical population
Census	Pop.	Note	%±
1800	767		—
1810	970		26.5%
1820	1,488		53.4%
1830	1,699		14.2%
1840	1,742		2.5%
1850	1,419		−18.5%
1860	1,440		1.5%
1870	1,209		−16.0%
1880	1,115		−7.8%
1890	920		−17.5%
1900	785		−14.7%
1910	697		−11.2%
1920	663		−4.9%
1930	752		13.4%
1940	828		10.1%
1950	1,014		22.5%
1960	2,234		120.3%
1970	3,620		62.0%
1980	3,863		6.7%
1990	3,856		−0.2%
2000	3,869		0.3%
2010	3,819		−1.3%
2016 (est.)	3,776		−1.1%
U.S. Decennial Census

As of the census of 2000, 3,869 people, 1,394 households, and 1,091 families reside in the town. The population density was 111.8 inhabitants per square mile (43.2/km^{2}). There were 1,483 housing units at an average density of 42.9 per square mile (16.6/km^{2}). The town's racial makeup was 97.49% White, 0.36% African American, 0.18% Native American, 0.41% Asian, 0.08% Pacific Islander, 0.18% from other races, and 1.29% from two or more races. Hispanic or Latino of any race were 1.03% of the population.

There were 1,394 households, out of which 38.8% had children under the age of 18 living with them, 63.0% were married couples living together, 10.4% had a female householder with no male present, and 21.7% were non-families. 17.3% of all households comprised individuals, and 7.4% had someone who was 65 or older living alone. The average household size was 2.78 and the average family size was 3.11.

The town's population was spread out, with 28.0% under 18, 6.7% from 18 to 24, 29.7% from 25 to 44, 24.8% from 45 to 64, and 10.6% who were 65 years or older. The median age was 36 years. For every 100 females, there were 97.6 males. For every 100 females age 18 and over, there were 93.3 males.

The median income for a household in the town was $40,192, and the median income for a family was $44,583. Males had a median income of $33,151 versus $22,718 for females. The per capita income for the town was $17,405. About 2.8% of families and 4.2% of the population were below the poverty line, including 5.1% of those under age 18 and 5.6% of those age 65 or over.

== Communities and locations in Floyd, NY ==
- Camroden – A hamlet in the northwestern part of the town named by Welsh immigrants. Welsh was the predominant language here from 1825 until the late 1880s.
- East Floyd – A hamlet in the northeastern part of the town.
- Floyd – The hamlet of Floyd on NY 365.
- Pen Bonc Hill – An elevation in the northeastern corner of the town.
- The Punch Bowl – The site of the first settlement and the first mill in the town.
- South Hill – A small mountain range in the northeastern corner of the town. Partially in the Town of Western.
- Steuben Valley – A hamlet at the northeastern corner of the town.
- Stittville – A hamlet at the eastern town line.

== Notable people ==
- Cliff Kotary, Hall of Fame auto racing driver
- Matthew Ewing, inventor and co-founder of Vacuum Oil Company
- Onias C. Skinner, Illinois jurist and legislator
