= Stittville, New York =

- Hamlet and CDP
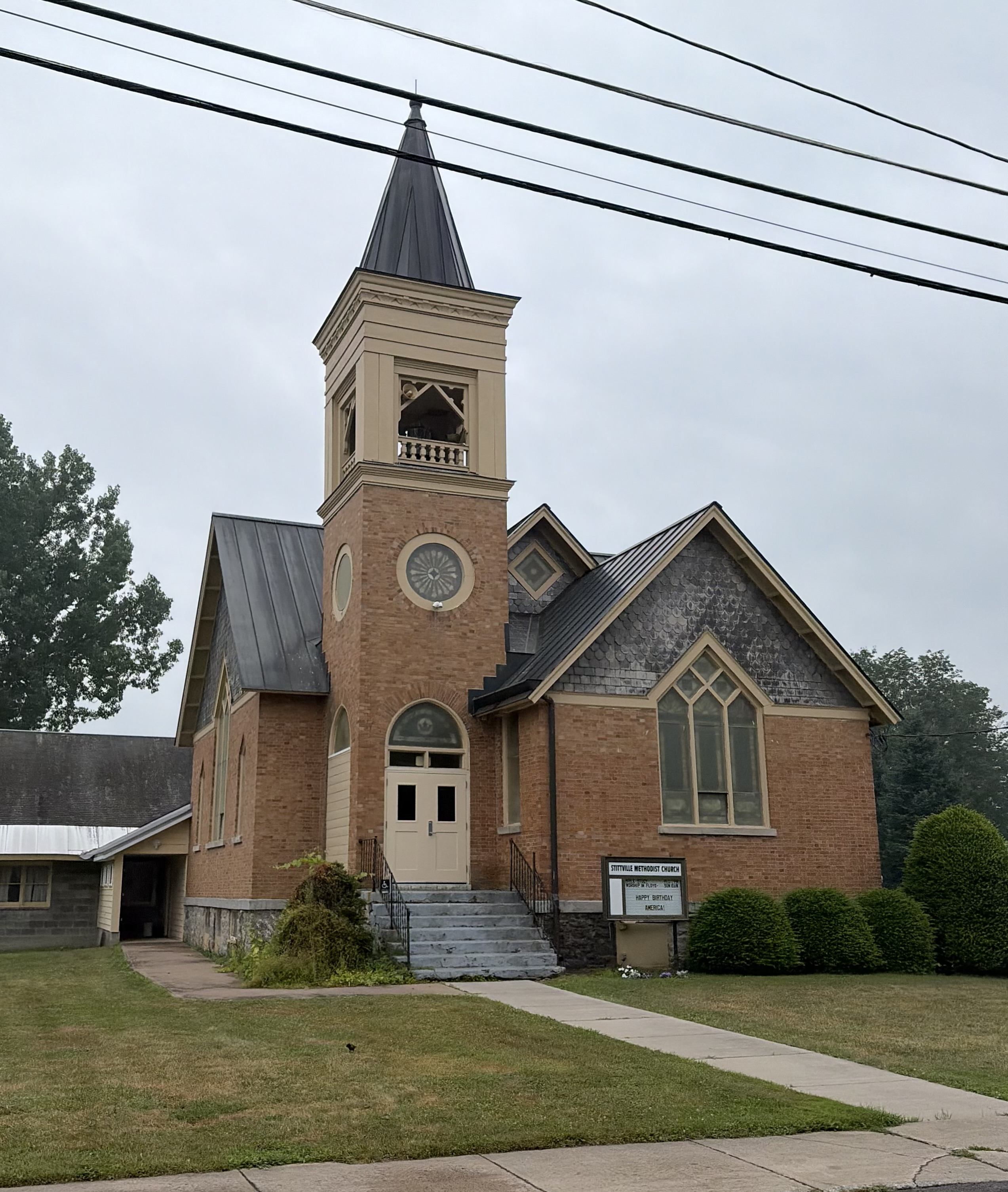
- Stittville Methodist Church

- Location within New York Location within the United States
- Coordinates: 43°13′23″N 75°17′18″W
- Country: United States
- State: New York
- County: Oneida
- Town: Marcy

Area
  - Total: 0.51 sq mi (1.31 km^{2})
  - Land: 0.49 sq mi (1.27 km^{2})
  - Water: 0.015 sq mi (0.04 km^{2})
- Elevation: 538 ft (164 m)
- Time zone: UTC-5 (Eastern (EST))
  - Summer (DST): UTC-4 (EDT)
- ZIP code: 13469
- Area codes: 315 & 680
- GNIS feature ID: 966461

Stittville is a hamlet (and census-designated place) in the town of Marcy in Oneida County, New York, United States. The community is located along New York State Route 291, 9 miles (14 km) north-northwest of Utica. Stittville has a post office with ZIP code 13469. As of the 2020 census, Stittville had a population of 294.

== Education ==
It is in the Holland Patent Central School District.
