= Pen Bonc Hill =

Mountain in New York, United States

- Location within New York Location within the United States

Highest point
- Elevation: 1,286 feet (392 m)
- Coordinates: 43°17′01″N 75°16′59″W

Geography
- Location: NNW of Holland Patent, New York, U.S.
- Topo map: USGS North Western

Pen Bonc Hill is a summit located in Central New York Region of New York located in the Town of Floyd in Oneida County, north-northwest of Holland Patent.
