= High Level Pumping Station =

Water pumping station in Ontario, Canada

Coordinates: 43.678472°N 79.40212°W

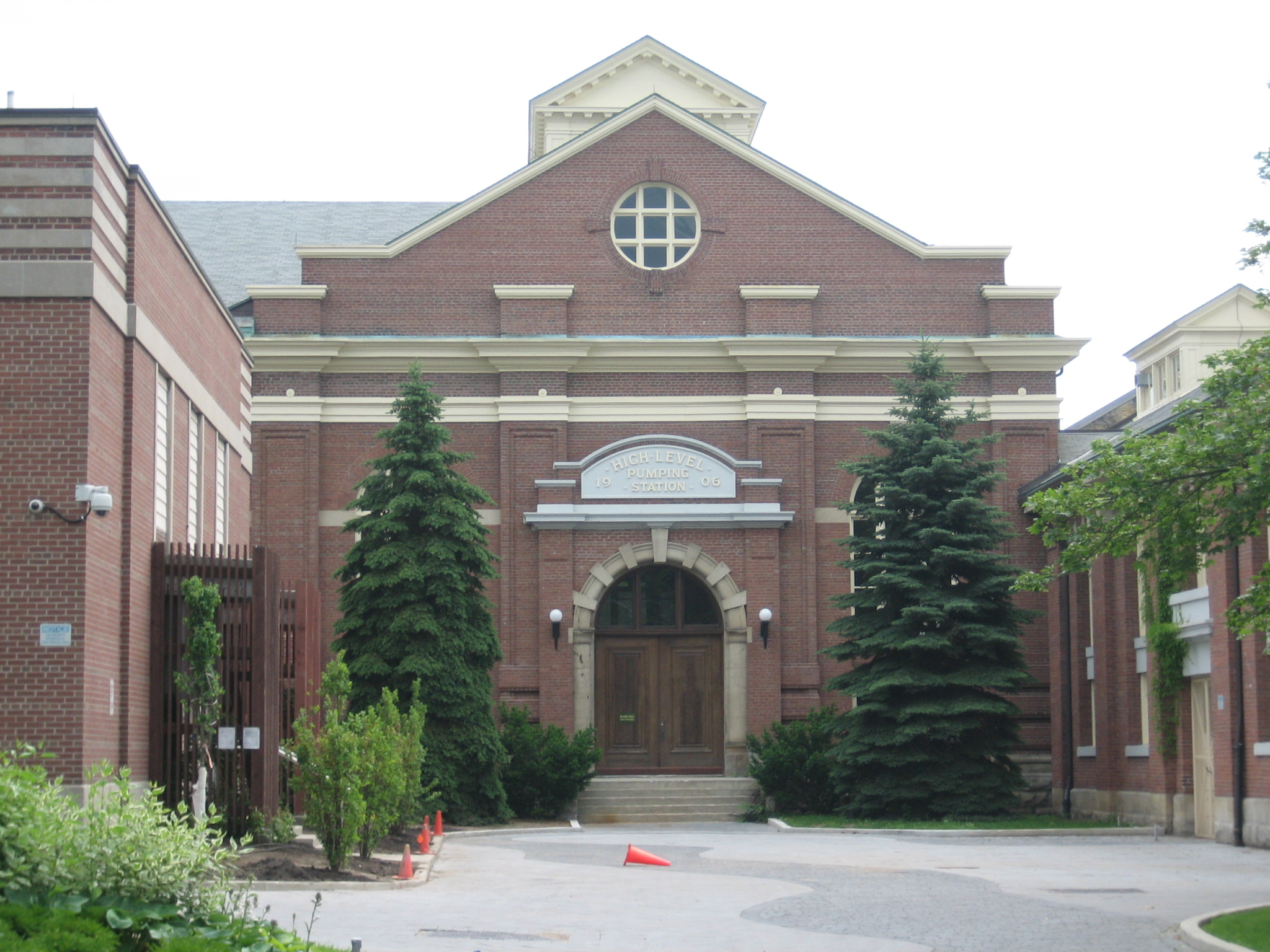

General information
- Location: Toronto
- Opened: 1906

The High Level Pumping Station is a municipal water pumping station in Toronto, Ontario,

Canada. It is also home to the central control for the city of Toronto's water distribution system. It is located in a residential neighbourhood near the intersection of Avenue Road and Dupont Street.

== History ==
The current building was erected in 1906, and expanded in 1910 with a final expansion in 1952. It was designated a heritage site by the city in 1985. It was built on the site of the Yorkville Waterworks, which had been established in 1875 to provide the then separate town of Yorkville, Ontario with drinking water.

It is one of 22 pumping stations in Toronto that move water from Lake Ontario to the higher elevation, northern parts of the city. The High Level Pumping Station is one of the hubs of the system, with 10 pumps. While previously all these stations were staffed, today it is only the High Level station which has permanent workers. Municipal employees from the site monitor the city's water supply twenty-four hours per day. There is a back-up to the control room at the John Street Pumping Station, which is the highest capacity station in the system.
