= South Hill (Eureka County, Nevada) =

Mountain in Nevada, United States

Coordinates: 39°21′49″N 115°59′35″W

South Hill is a summit in the U.S. state of Nevada. The elevation is 7,264 feet (2,214 m).

South Hill was named for the fact it is south of other nearby summits.
