= South Hill (Oneida County, New York) =

Mountain in New York, United States

- Location within New York Location within the United States

Highest point
- Elevation: 1,283 feet (391 m)
- Coordinates: 43°16′53″N 75°17′42″W

Geography
- Location: NW of Holland Patent, New York, U.S.
- Topo map: USGS North Western

South Hill is a summit located in Central New York Region of New York located in the Towns of Floyd and Western. Located in Oneida County, northwest of Holland Patent.

The summit is positioned inside the South Hill State Forest. The 622-acres forest was obtained by the state of New York in the 1950s for the purpose of reforestation, wildlife management, timber production, recreation and watershed protection.
