= Southill =

Southill may refer to:

- Southill, Bedfordshire, England
- Southill, Limerick, Ireland
- Southill, Weymouth, Dorset, England

Southill may also refer to:

- Viscount Torrington, Lord Byng of Southill
