= John Street Pumping Station =

Water pumping station in Toronto, Canada

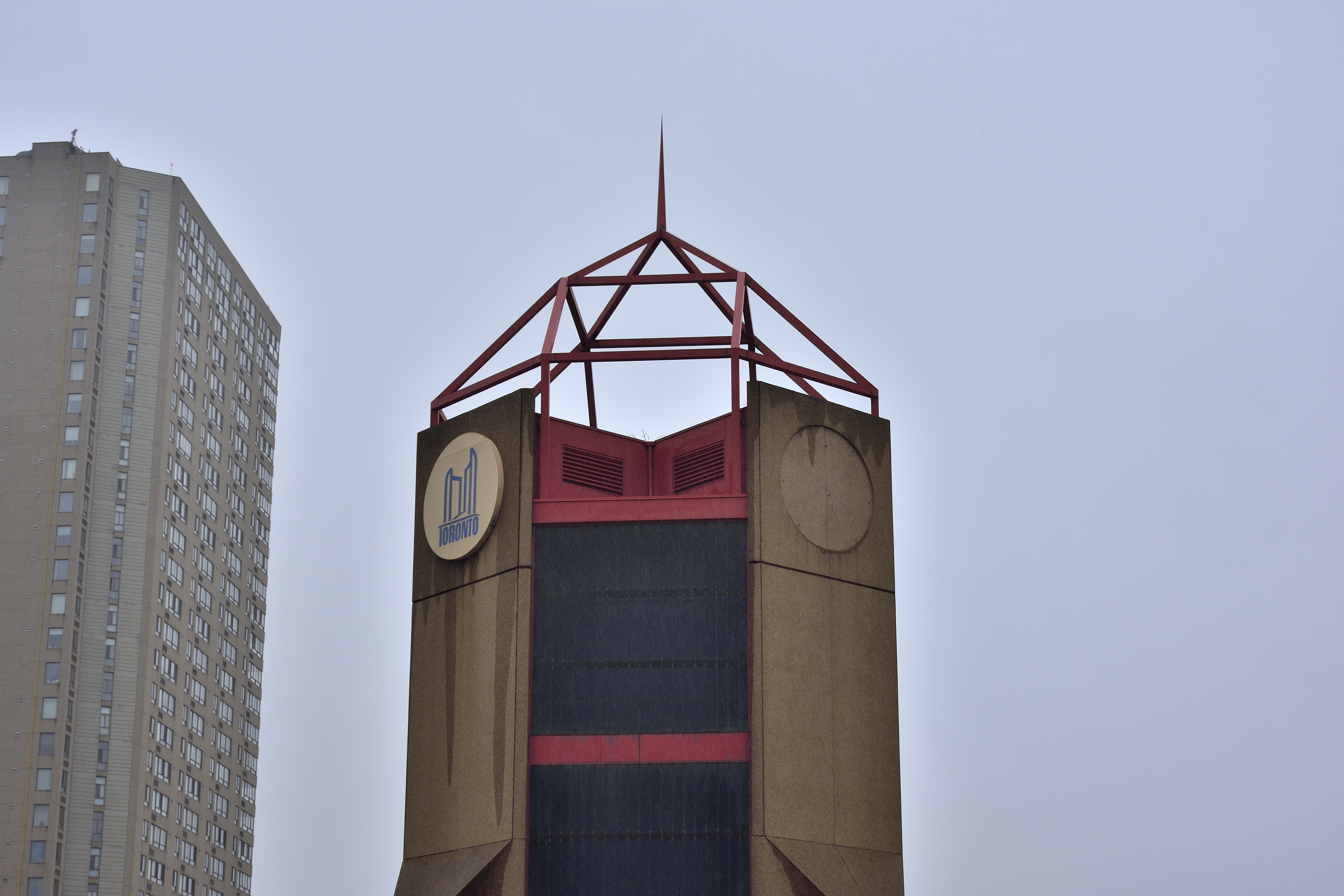
John Street Pumping Station

The John Street Pumping Station is a municipal water pumping station in Toronto, Ontario, Canada. This pumping station also incorporates the Deep Lake Water Cooling System. The station was originally located on John Street where the SkyDome is presently located. It was relocated in 1987 to its present location bounded by Bremner Boulevard, Rees Street (formerly John Street), Lake Shore Boulevard, and Van De Water Crescent.

== History ==
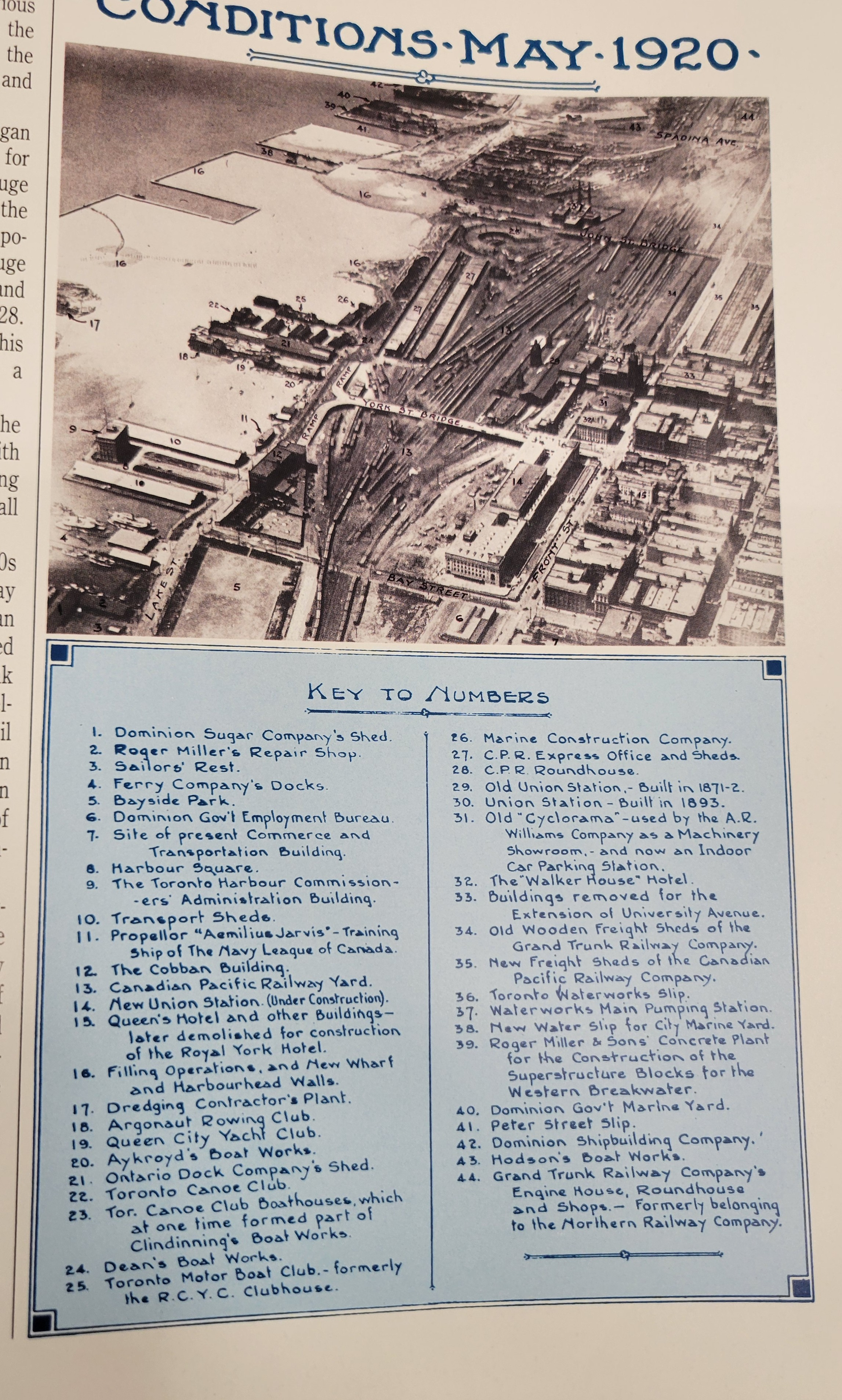
Toronto Waterfront in 1920, Note the location of the John Street Pumping Station

The first station near this site was a privately owned pumping station that was located further north. In 1874 the first municipally owned water pumping station was constructed near the John Street site was built on a pier jutting out into Toronto Bay. This had a capacity of 36 million litres per day and served a population of 70,000 residents.

The John Street Pumping Station was originally supplied water from Toronto Harbour. In order to source better quality supplies, the supply pipelines were extended further out into the harbour and Toronto Island. These were ultimately insufficient in providing good quality potable water that was free of pathogens. In the 1880s water intakes were constructed into Lake Ontario and water treatment facilities were constructed on Toronto Island. These provided both better quality raw source water and potable water treatment.

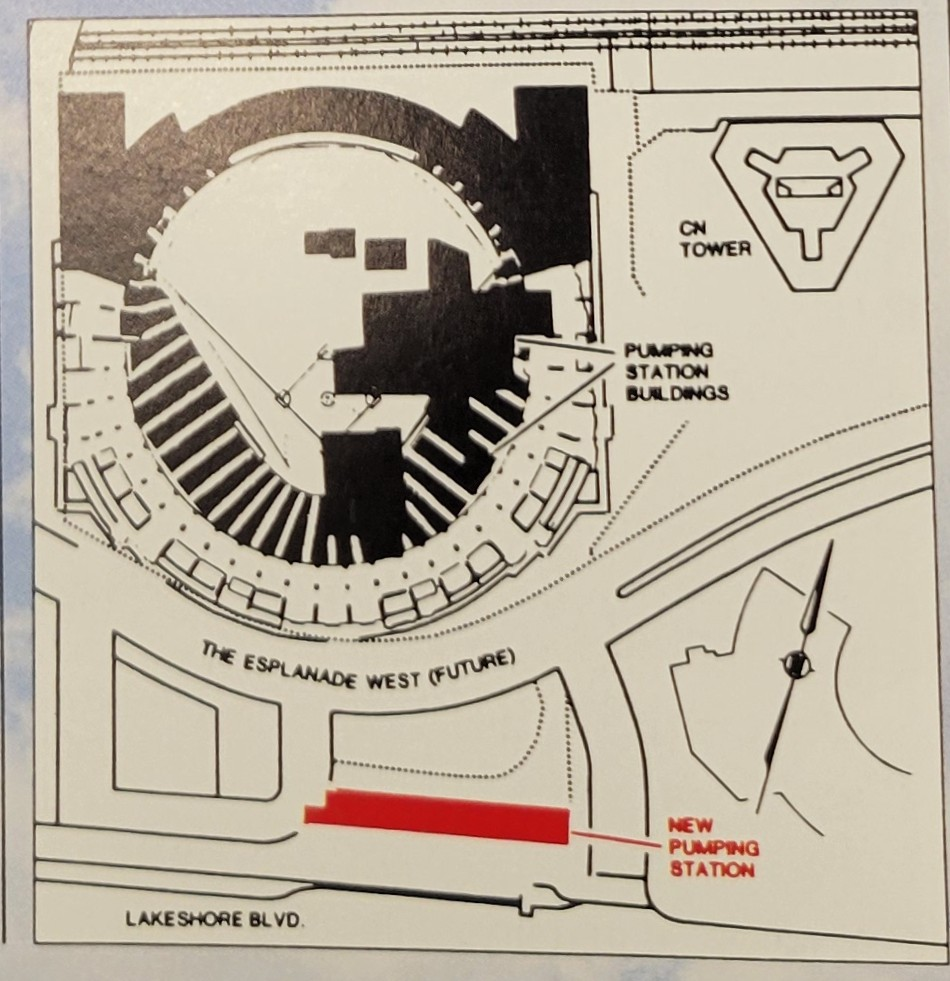
Old and new pumping station layout concepts

In 1895 and 1904 Toronto suffered large scale fires. During these events issues had occurred with John Street Pumping Station. A primarily issue was the supply lines that ran from the station to Toronto Island.

In 1908 a new tunnel system was constructed from Toronto Island, and this was connected to the John Street Pumping Station. This tunnel is now referred to as the Cross Harbor Watermain Tunnel or CHWT.

On January 1, 1954, the new Metro corporation took over water supply duties. At this time the station had a capacity of 641 million litres per day, serving a population of 1.25 million residents.

During the 1960s the station pumps were converted to be electrically driven, with one backup diesel driven pump for emergency purposes. At this time the station had a capacity of 991 million litres per day, serving a population of 2.2 million residents.

In 1977 the Toronto Island Water Treatment Plant (at the time referred to as the Island Filtration Plant) was constructed. It supplied water to the John Street Pumping Station by the 1908 Treated Water Tunnel.

During the 1980s planning had occurred for the construction of the new SkyDome stadium on the pumping station site. The station complex had grown to five buildings, some nearly a century old. An original plan had considered locating the station underneath the SkyDome; however, this was ultimately deemed impractical. The selected option was the relocation of the station to its present location along Lakeshore Boulevard.

This relocation project was undertaken by R.V. Anderson Associates Limited and was constructed by Ellis Don contractors. This work required uninterrupted supply of water from the pumping station during the course of the work. Reviews were undertaken for pump replacements but it was ultimately determined that the existing pumps were of high quality and were best to be saved. The project then considered the design of the new station to accommodate the existing pumps. This then required the staged relocation of the existing pumps to the new station all while maintaining the City water supply.

The whole process of commissioning and decommissioning the nine pumps was carried out from May through August, 1987. By the end of the September 1987, the old John Street pumping station was demolished except for the surge tank which remaining until October 1987. Once the old station was removed work could then proceed on the SkyDome construction.

The total cost of relocating the pumping station plus providing a site for a new Works Department yard on Commissioners Street amounted to $19 million. The project was awarded with a Canadian Consulting Engineer Award of Merit

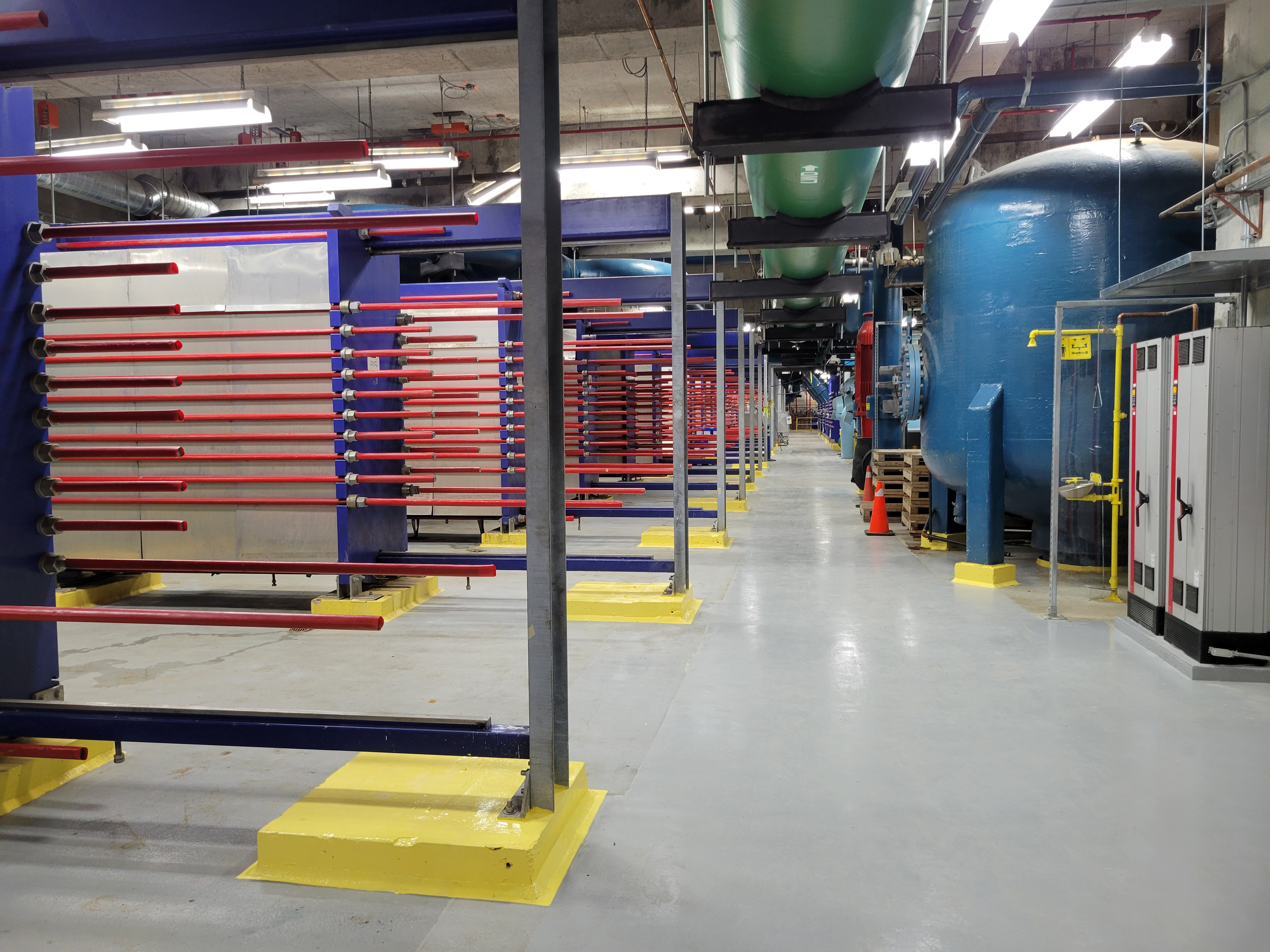
John Street Pumping Station Heat Exchangers, Heat Exchanger Gallery

In 2004 the station was further expanded to accommodate the Deep Lake Water Cooling System. This extension included a piping gallery, heat exchanger gallery and a mixed usage upper gallery. This section of the John Street Pumping station is known as the Energy Transfer Station or the John Street Energy Centre and is operated by Enwave Energy Corporation. This extension was further upgraded in 2004 as part of the Deep Lake Water Cooling Expansion to house additional process and heat exchange equipment.
