= Enwave =

Canadian energy company

Enwave Energy Corporation
- Type: Subsidiary
- Industry: District energy
- Predecessor: Toronto District Heating Corporation
- Founded: 1 January 1996
- Headquarters: Toronto, Ontario, Canada
- Area served: Downtown Toronto
- Owner: Ontario Teachers Pension Plan and IFM Investors
- Parent: Ontario Teachers Pension Plan

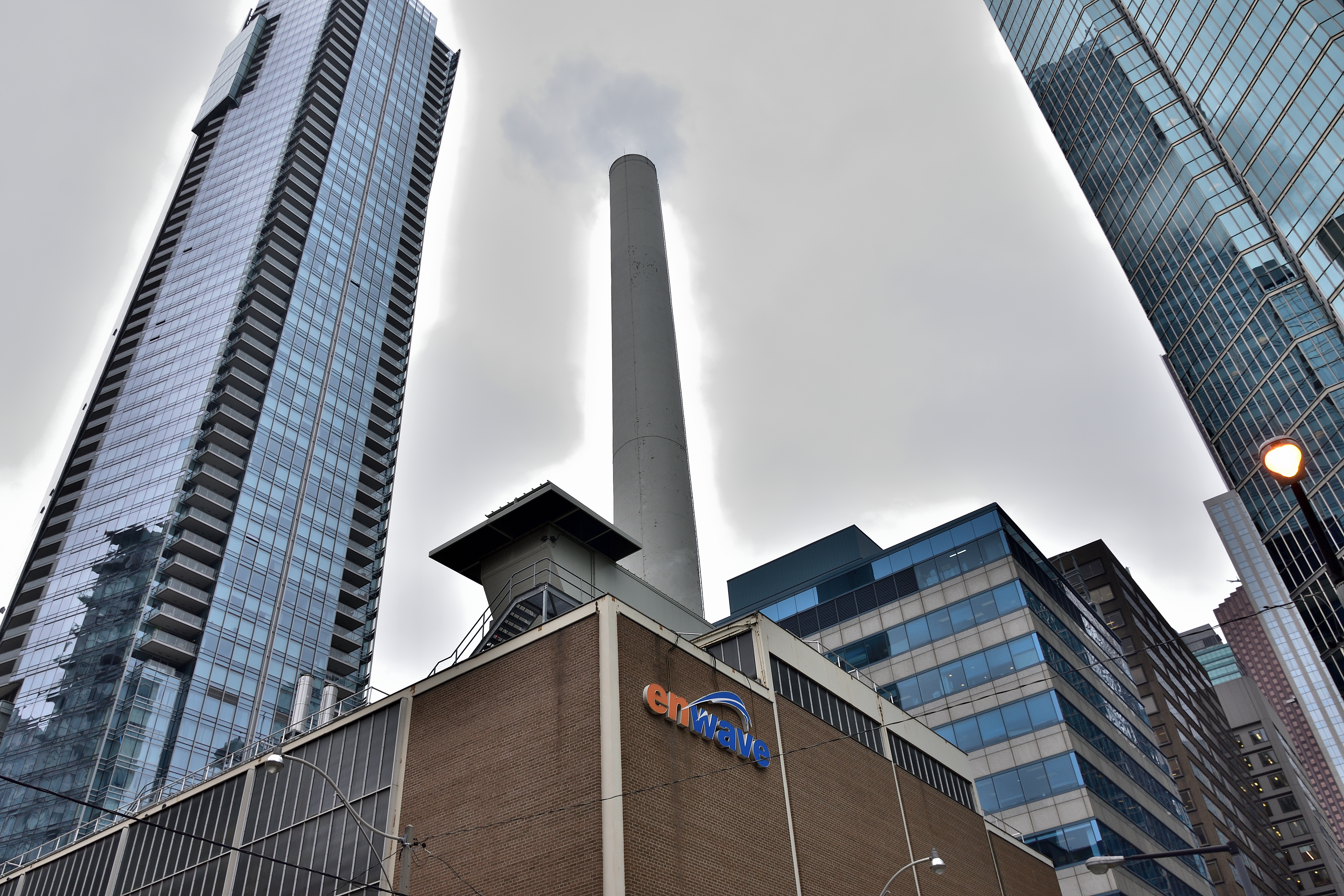
Enwave steam plant and smoke stack viewed from Pearl and Simcoe Street.

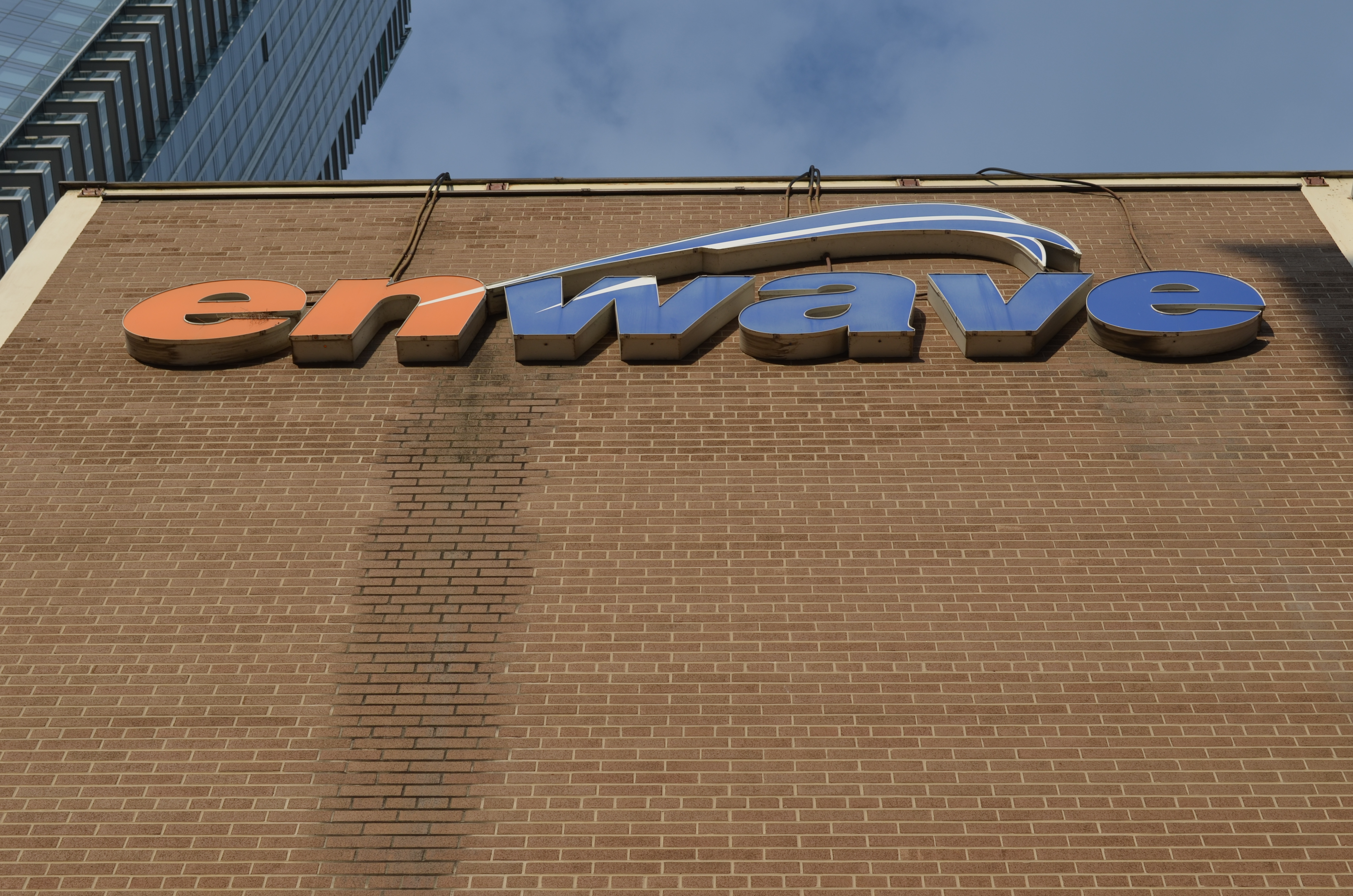
Enwave Energy in Toronto

Enwave Energy Corporation is a Canadian multinational energy company based in Toronto that focuses on sustainable district energy including heating, cooling, hot water, combined heat and power, and geothermal energy systems. It is one of the largest district energy systems in North America and has been referred as the leading energy district system with 17 heating plants, 21 chilled water plants and ice on coil storage tanks. It serves over 700 customers including commercial properties, developers, municipalities, health care, educational centres and residential units.

== History ==
The company was originally established as the Toronto Hospitals Steam Corporation in 1969 to provide heating services for the Toronto General Hospital, the Hospital for Sick Children, New Mount Sinai Hospital and Women's College Hospital, and later provided these services to other medical institutions, the University of Toronto and the provincial government. It was renamed as the Toronto District Heating Corporation in 1980, at which time it acquired the steam utility that was also being operated by Toronto Hydro.

The corporation was privatized in 1998, with shares going to the province, the municipal government of Toronto, the University of Toronto and the four founding hospitals. The corporation was renamed as Enwave in 1999. Over time, only two shareholders remained: the city with 43%, and the Ontario Municipal Employees Retirement System with 57%.

On October 2, 2012, Toronto City Council voted to sell its 43% stake in Enwave. This followed an announcement that Brookfield Asset Management would acquire the entire company through a partnership.

In April 2021, Australian investment firm QIC partnered with Ullico to acquire a "100% interest in the U.S. business of Enwave Energy", rebranding Enwave's former U.S. operations to CenTrio.

== Notable projects ==
=== Deep Lake Water Cooling System ===
Enwave's Deep Lake Water Cooling (DLWC) is a system that harnesses the cold temperature at the bottom of Lake Ontario to cool hospitals, data centers, educational campuses, government buildings, commercial and residential buildings. Some customers include Toronto-Dominion Centre, Royal Bank Plaza, RBC Centre, Metro Toronto Convention Centre and Scotiabank Arena.

It utilizes three large pipes have been run 5 kilometres (3.1 miles) into Lake Ontario, to a depth of 83 metres. The water at that depth is a constant 4 °C, its temperature protected by a layer of water above it, called a thermocline. The water is piped to a filtration plant and then to a heat-transfer station on the lakeside. Here the chill is “transferred” to another closed loop, consisting of smaller pipes that supply the towers of the city's financial district. Built at a cost of C$230m ($200m) over four years, the system is run by the Enwave Energy Corporation.

The cooling system is a clean, renewable, and reliable energy source. Compared to traditional air-conditioning, Deep Lake Water Cooling reduces electricity use by 75%, and will eliminate 40,000 tonnes of carbon dioxide, the equivalent of taking 8,000 cars off the streets.

Enwave draws cold water (4 °C/39 °F) from a depth of 83 metres (272 feet) below the surface of Lake Ontario. Cold lake water is pumped through the source side of heat exchangers situated at Toronto's John Street Pumping Station while a glycol and water mixture is circulated through the load circuit of the heat exchanger, allowing for a net energy transfer from the water/glycol mixture to the lake water. The chiller glycol mixture is then circulated using pumps throughout fan-coil units installed in high-rise properties throughout the region served by Enwave in Downtown Toronto where is absorbs energy and repeats the cycle to provide cooling and dehumidification. This system is advantageous since it reduces, or even completely eradicates chiller usage during summer months and shoulder seasons, reducing energy usage, as well as minimizing the number of evaporative cooling towers from operating, which are susceptible to becoming breeding grounds for Legionella pneumophila.

This system was officially launched on August 17, 2004, at Steam Whistle Brewing, one of Enwave's customers. In support of Deep Lake Water Cooling (DLWC), the launch was attended by actor and renewable energy activist Alec Baldwin, Ontario Minister of Energy Dwight Duncan, Canadian Minister of Human Resources and Skills Development Joe Volpe, and Toronto Deputy Mayor Sandra Bussin, among other business leaders and government officials. The launch coincided with the anniversary of the 2003 blackout.

=== DLWC Expansion ===
In 2019, Enwave announced a C$100 million system expansion with C$10 million in federal funding from the Ministry of Environment and Climate Change's Low Carbon Economy Challenge.

The expansion of the DLWC supply could reduce demand on the electricity grid during peak times by up to 0.5 kW per ton of cooling load delivered, resulting in up to 70% peak demand savings in electricity compared to a mechanical chiller plant. The expansion will increase the capacity of the District Heat Recovery System, which produces up to 93% less carbon emissions compared to traditional heating technology.

=== London CHP II ===
Enwave's London Energy Plant has 6 miles (9.7 kilometres) of steam pipes, 1.85 miles (2.98 kilometres) of chilled water pipes and has recently invested 50 million dollars to supply power to the provincial electricity grid through London's local grid.

In 2019, the Province of Ontario funded the system to expand and include an additional combined heat and power (CHP) system, 17 MW gas turbine, 4 MW condensing steam turbine, 1,451 metric tons of electric chillers. London Energy Plant now serves 60 customers, including St. Joseph's Health Care London.

=== The Well ===
The Well is a mixed-use development with over 3 million sq ft (0.28 million m^{2}) of retail, office and residential space. Enwave designed and installed a new state-of-the-art thermal storage facility underneath The Well, consisting of a large temperature-controlled tank. The tank is fed by the DLWC system and has the capacity to hold 2 million US gal (7.6 million L) of water. This system is a thermal battery which can providing heating in the winter and cooling in the summer using water pumps and heat pumps, in conjunction with Enwave's Toronto district heating network and Deep Lake Water Cooling System. The Well adjusts temperature at night during off-peak hours, reducing both strain on the electricity grid and spent energy costs. The system is efficient, resilient, and supplies low-carbon heating and cooling to an additional 17 million sq ft (1.6 million m^{2}) of space.

=== Prince Edward Island ===
With Federal support, Enwave is pursuing a project on Prince Edward Island which will divert an additional 23,000 tonnes of waste from landfill to generate energy, thus reducing harmful methane emissions. The federal government is contributing $3.5 million to upgrade and expand a 35-year-old waste-to-energy system in Charlottetown. The upgrade will include a larger furnace, the addition of a heat recovery boiler and air pollution controls.

Through the life of the project it could, on average, reduce carbon dioxide emissions by 75,000 tonnes a year.

=== New Orleans ===
In 2005, hurricanes Katrina and Rita devastated homes, businesses, and critical infrastructure in New Orleans. Electrical substations were flooded and the city lost power for several weeks. Throughout the disaster, Enwave's district energy plant, maintained service to Louisiana's largest health care and medical research center. As the only functioning facility with power and cooling, it also served as a hub for FEMA workers. Louisiana State University subsequently commissioned Enwave to design, build and operate a future-proof system with the same level of reliability and redundancy to provide critical medical services through a disaster. The plant is designed to be failproof: built to withstand hurricane-force winds and a 20-foot storm surge, with all critical equipment located 20 feet above grade. It also features emergency backup generation and an innovative 55,000 ton-hour “ice battery” to store energy, allowing the plant to operate for seven full days off-grid in the event of a disaster. After hurricane Katrina, Enwave expanded its service in New Orleans beyond the medical district. Enwave constructed a new steam plant in 2014 to serve an additional 22 buildings in the business core. Its three 70,000-lb/hr natural gasfired boilers produce steam for distribution to 22 buildings totaling 4.1 million sq ft for space heating, domestic hot water, laundry and sterilization use. Construction of the $28 million steam plant was completed on budget and two months ahead of schedule. The plant won the DBIA National Award of Merit and the ENR Best Projects for Texas and Louisiana Award of Merit.

== Sustainability ==
Enwave also helped solidify LEED certification applications for its customers. Enwave customers One York Street in Toronto achieved LEED Platinum certification, and in Chicago Aon Center holds a LEED Silver certification.

The United Nations initiative called “United 4 Sustainable Smart Cities” published a study titled “Deep Lake Water Cooling: its origins and the next evolution” about Enwave's DLWC system. The study speaks of the origins of Deep Lake Water Cooling, Enwave's current impact, plans for a 4th intake, integration of thermal storage at The Well, and how Enwave is integrating heat pumps to create a community energy sharing network at scale to provide resilient, low carbon heating and cooling.

== See also ==
- District heating
- Seattle Steam Company (former subsidiary)
