= Thermal energy storage =

Technologies to store thermal energy

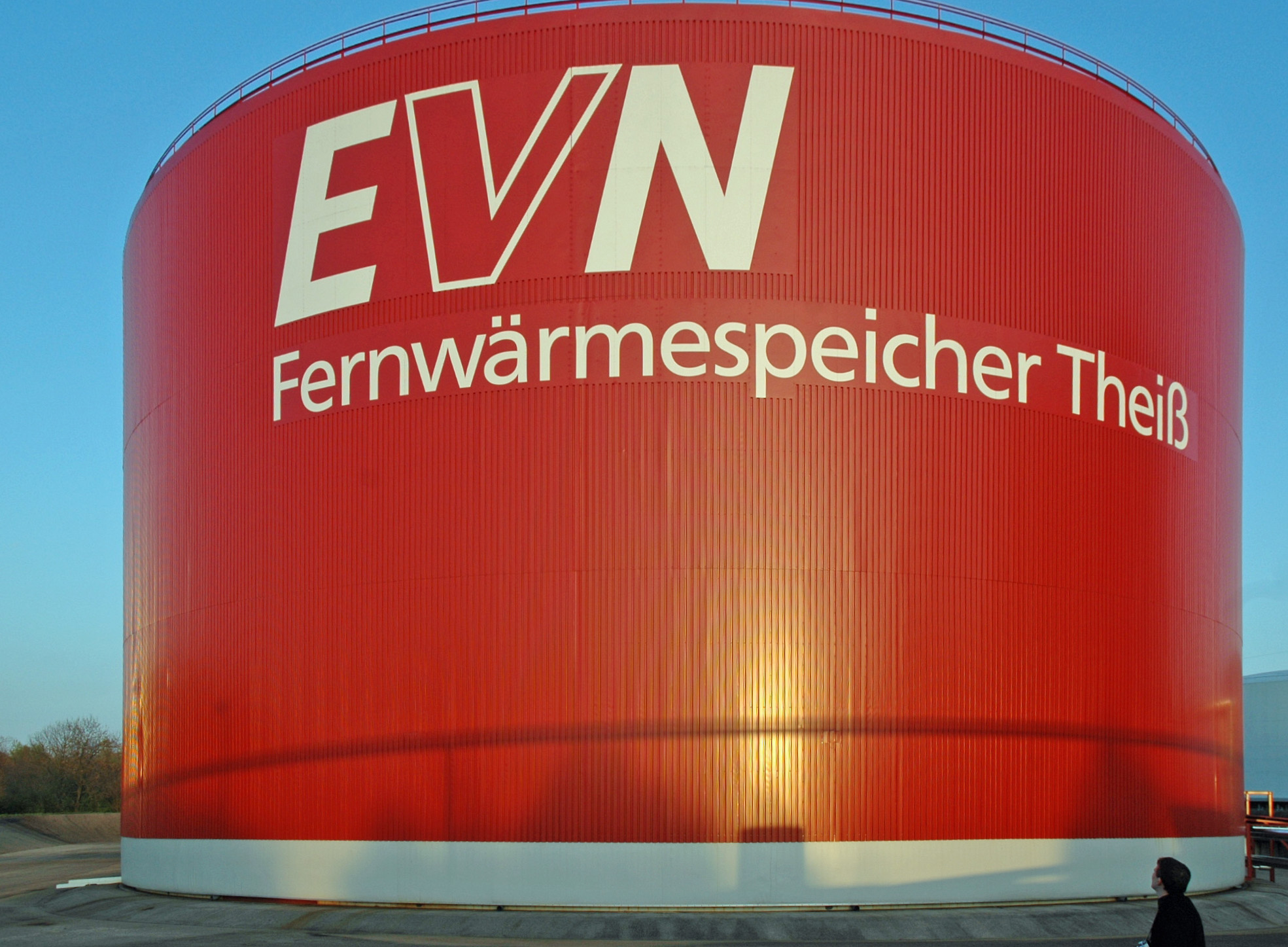
District heating accumulation tower from Theiss near Krems an der Donau in Lower Austria with a thermal capacity of 2 GWh

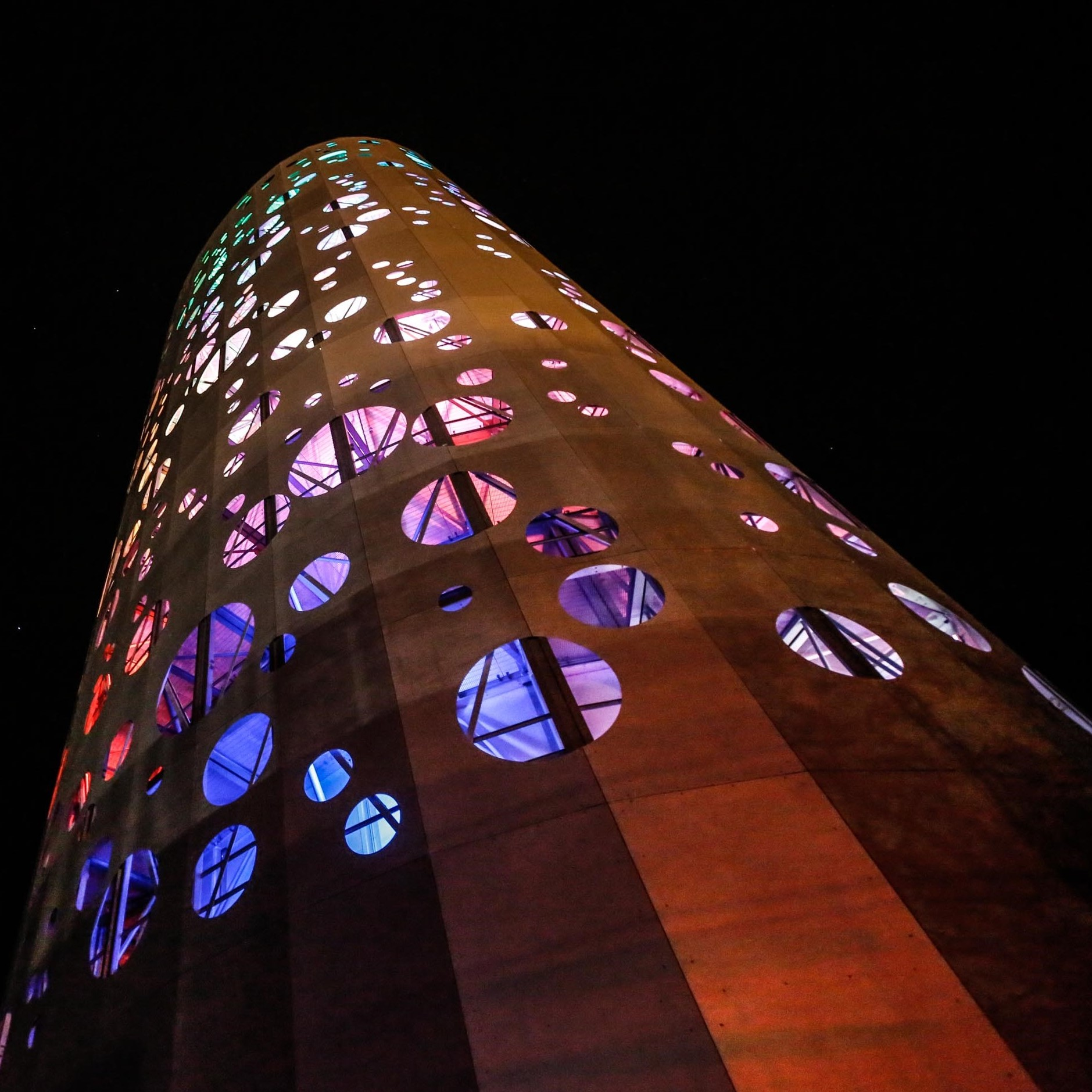
Thermal energy storage tower inaugurated in 2017 in Bozen-Bolzano, South Tyrol, Italy

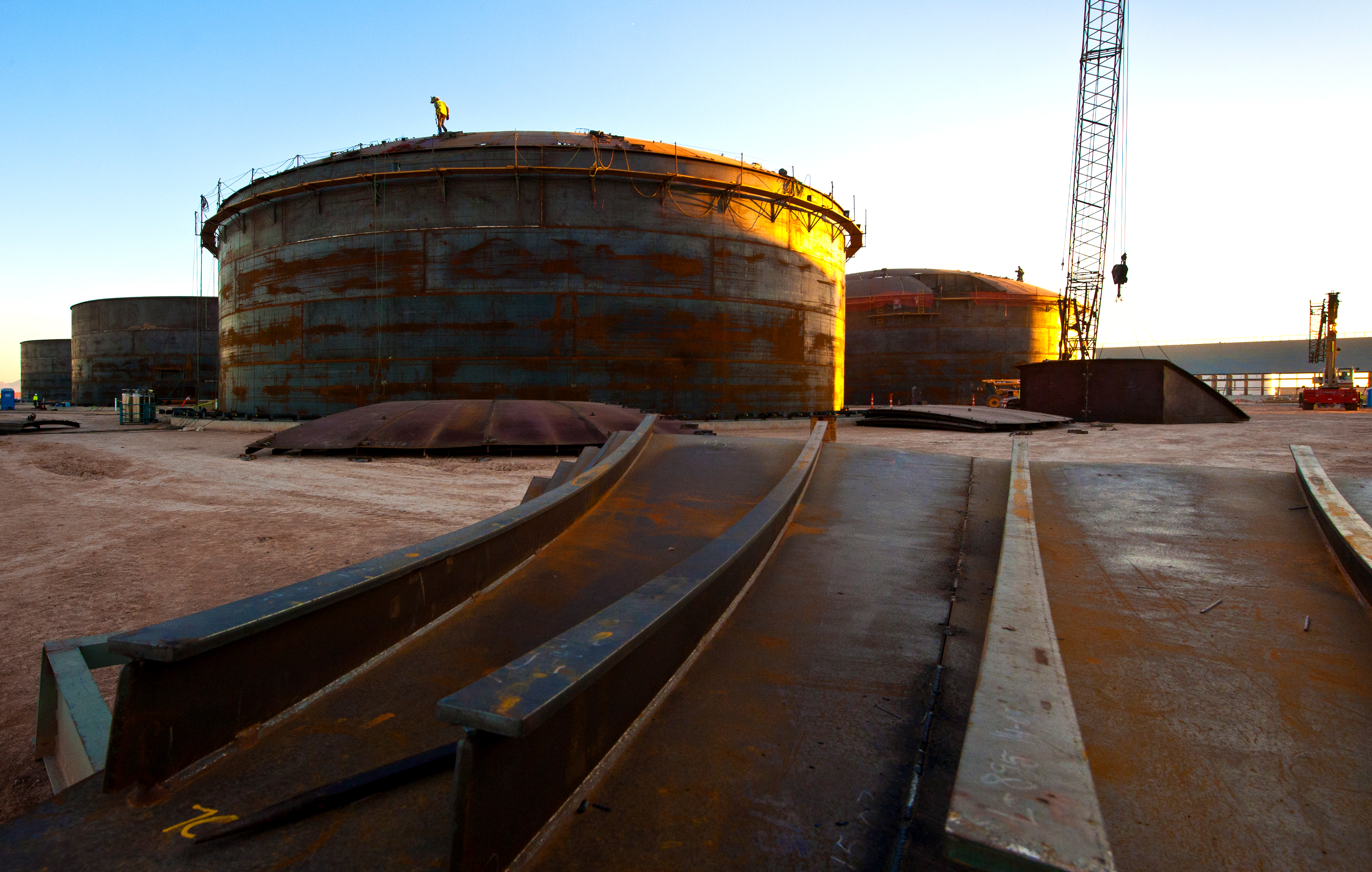
Construction of the salt tanks at the Solana Generating Station, which provide thermal energy storage to allow generation during night or peak demand. The 280 MW plant is designed to provide six hours of energy storage. This allows the plant to generate about 38 percent of its rated capacity over the course of a year.

Thermal energy storage (TES) is the storage of thermal energy for later reuse. Employing widely different technologies, it allows thermal energy to be stored for hours, days, or months. Scale, both of storage and use, vary from small to large – from individual processes to district, town, or region as part of a thermal energy network. Usage examples are the balancing of energy demand between daytime and nighttime, storing summer heat for winter heating, or winter cold for summer cooling (seasonal thermal energy storage). Storage media include water or ice-slush tanks, masses of native earth or bedrock accessed with heat exchangers by means of boreholes, deep aquifers contained between impermeable strata; shallow, lined pits filled with gravel and water and insulated at the top, as well as eutectic solutions and phase-change materials.

Other sources of thermal energy for storage include heat or cold produced with heat pumps from off-peak, lower cost electric power, a practice called peak shaving; heat from combined heat and power (CHP) power plants; heat produced by renewable electrical energy that exceeds grid demand and waste heat from industrial processes. Heat storage, both seasonal and short term, is considered an important means for cheaply balancing high shares of variable renewable electricity production and integration of electricity and heating sectors in energy systems almost or completely fed by renewable energy.

== Categories ==
The kinds of thermal energy storage can be divided into three separate categories: sensible heat, latent heat, and thermo-chemical heat storage. Each of these has different advantages and disadvantages that determine their applications.

=== Sensible heat storage ===
Sensible heat storage (SHS) is the most straightforward method. It simply means the temperature of some medium is either increased or decreased. This type of storage is the most commercially available out of the three; other techniques are less developed.

The materials are generally inexpensive and safe. One of the cheapest, most commonly used options is a water tank, but materials such as molten salts or metals can be heated to higher temperatures and therefore offer a higher storage capacity. Energy can also be stored underground (UTES), either in an underground tank or in some kind of heat-transfer fluid (HTF) flowing through a system of pipes, either placed vertically in U-shapes (boreholes) or horizontally in trenches. Yet another system is known as a packed-bed (or pebble-bed) storage unit, in which some fluid, usually air, flows through a bed of loosely packed material (usually rock, pebbles or ceramic brick) to add or extract heat.

A disadvantage of SHS is its dependence on the properties of the storage medium. Storage capacities are limited by the specific heat capacity of the storage material, and the system needs to be properly designed to ensure energy extraction at a constant temperature.

Sensible heat storages normally have a low energy density, which means that they require large volumes and space for storage tanks and a slow loss of thermal energy over time even with the installations alongside the sensible heat storage.

==== Heat storage in tanks, ponds or rock caverns ====
A steam accumulator consists of an insulated steel pressure tank containing hot water and steam under pressure. As a heat storage device, it is used to mediate heat production by a variable or steady source from a variable demand for heat. Steam accumulators may take on a significance for energy storage in solar thermal energy projects.

Heat storage tanks are being used globally, primarily in regions with established district heating networks and in sunny areas for a use of concentrated solar power. These tanks serve in residential, commercial, and industrial purposes, ranging from seasonal heating to balancing renewable energy grids. This is an example of a sensible heat storage device that has both its benefits and disadvantages.

Water has one of the highest thermal capacities at 4.2 kJ/(kg⋅K). Large stores, mostly hot water storage tanks, are widely used in Nordic countries to store heat for several days, to decouple heat and power production and to help meet peak demands. Some towns use insulated ponds heated by solar power as a heat source for district heating pumps. Intersessional storage in caverns has been investigated and appears to be economical and plays a significant role in heating in Finland. Energy producer Helen Oy estimates an 11.6 GWh capacity and 120 MW thermal output for its 260,000 m^{3} water cistern under Mustikkamaa (fully charged or discharged in 4 days at capacity), operating from 2021 to offset days of peak production/demand; while the 300,000 m^{3} rock caverns 50 m under sea level in Kruunuvuorenranta (near Laajasalo) were designated in 2018 to store heat in summer from warm seawater and release it in winter for district heating. In 2024, it was announced that the municipal energy supplier of Vantaa had commissioned an underground heat storage facility of over 1,100,000 cubic metres (39,000,000 cu ft) in size and 90 GWh in capacity to be built, expected to be operational in 2028.

==== Molten salt technology ====
The sensible heat of molten salt is also used for storing solar energy at a high temperature, termed molten-salt technology or molten salt energy storage (MSES). Molten salts can be employed as a thermal energy storage method to retain thermal energy. Presently, this is a commercially used technology to store the heat collected by concentrated solar power (e.g., from a solar power tower or solar trough). The heat can later be converted into superheated steam to power conventional steam turbines and generate electricity at a later time. It was demonstrated in the Solar Two project from 1995 to 1999. Estimates in 2006 predicted an annual efficiency of 99%, a reference to the energy retained by storing heat before turning it into electricity, versus converting heat directly into electricity. Various eutectic mixtures of different salts are used (e.g., sodium nitrate, potassium nitrate and calcium nitrate). Experience with such systems exists in non-solar applications in the chemical and metals industries as a heat-transport fluid.

The salt melts at 131 °C (268 °F). It is kept liquid at 288 °C (550 °F) in an insulated "cold" storage tank. The liquid salt is pumped through panels in a solar collector where the focused sun heats it to 566 °C (1,051 °F). It is then sent to a hot storage tank. With proper insulation of the tank the thermal energy can be usefully stored for up to a week. When electricity is needed, the hot molten salt is pumped to a conventional steam-generator to produce superheated steam for driving a conventional turbine/generator set as used in a coal, oil, or nuclear power plant. A 100-megawatt turbine would need a tank of about 9.1 metres (30 ft) tall and 24 metres (79 ft) in diameter to drive it for four hours by this design.

A single tank with a divider plate to separate cold and hot molten salt is under development. It is more economical by achieving 100% more heat storage per unit volume over the dual tanks system as the molten-salt storage tank is costly due to its complicated construction. Phase-change materials (PCMs) are also used in molten-salt energy storage, while research on obtaining shape-stabilized PCMs using high porosity matrices is ongoing.

Most solar thermal power plants use this thermal energy storage concept. The Solana Generating Station in the U.S. can store 6 hours worth of generating capacity in molten salt. During the summer of 2013 the Gemasolar Thermosolar solar power-tower/molten-salt plant in Spain achieved a first by continuously producing electricity 24 hours per day for 36 days. The Cerro Dominador Solar Thermal Plant, inaugurated in June 2021, has 17.5 hours of heat storage.

==== Silicon ====
Solid or molten silicon offers much higher storage temperatures than salts with consequent greater capacity and efficiency. It is being researched as a possible more energy efficient storage technology. Silicon is able to store more than 1 MWh of energy per cubic meter at 1400 °C. An additional advantage is the relative abundance of silicon when compared to the salts used for the same purpose.

Hot silicon thermal energy storing technology would be able to store significant thermal energy at extremely high temperatures (around 1400-2000 °C). This would be utilized by using the white hot molten silicon to store excess electricity generated from surrounding renewable sources like solar energy and wind power. This system would enable efficient, lower costing, and a longer duration of energy storage compared to other sensible heat storage options.

==== Aluminum ====
Another medium that can store thermal energy is molten (recycled) aluminum. This technology was developed by the Swedish company Azelio. The material is heated to 600 °C. When needed, the energy is transported to a Stirling engine using a heat-transfer fluid.

Molten aluminum is not widely used for energy storage due to some disadvantages that have yet to be overcome. This includes molten aluminum's reactivity and the challenges that come along with handling the solidification of the aluminum. However, research is being continued on how aluminum thermal storage could be used due to its high energy density. These aluminum based storage technologies have the potential to grow and to integrate renewable energy sources like solar and wind into the grid. These energy storage technologies are promising candidates for long term storage with minimal loss.

==== Rock, sand, and concrete ====
Rock, sand and concrete has a heat capacity about one third of water's. On the other hand, concrete can be heated to much higher temperatures (1200 °C) by, for example, electrical heating and therefore has a much higher overall volumetric capacity. Thus in the example below, an insulated cube of about 2.8 m^{3} would appear to provide sufficient storage for a single house to meet 50% of heating demand. This could, in principle, be used to store surplus wind or solar heat due to the ability of electrical heating to reach high temperatures. At the neighborhood level, the Wiggenhausen-Süd solar development at Friedrichshafen in southern Germany has received international attention. This features a 12,000 m^{3} (420,000 ft^{3}) reinforced concrete thermal store linked to 4,300 m^{2} (46,000 ft^{2}) of solar collectors, which will supply the 570 houses with around 50% of their heating and hot water. Siemens-Gamesa built a 130 MWh thermal storage near Hamburg with 750 °C in basalt and 1.5 MW electric output. A similar system was scheduled for Sorø, Denmark, with 41–58% of the stored 18 MWh heat returned for the town's district heating, and 30–41% returned as electricity, but not retained.

Disadvantages to the use of hot rocks and concrete involve both of their heat capacity compared to water (about one third) meaning that much larger volumes of solid materials are required to store the same amount of energy, making it less suitable for storage areas with limited amount of space. Their challenges also relate to their implementations and maintenance. Over time with these materials heat loss is inevitable, the degradation of the materials, and their high initial costs all bring up contemplation of use. Relating to the integration difficulties, they require a challenging design to connect the storage and heat source to a distribution system.

Announced in 2022, "brick toaster" is an innovative heat reservoir operating at up to 1,500 °C (2,732 °F).

Polar Night Energy installed a thermal battery in Finland that stores heat in a mass of sand. It was expected to reduce carbon emissions from the local heating network by as much as 70%. It is about 42 ft (13 m) tall and 50 ft (15 m) wide. It can store 100 MWh, with a round trip efficiency of 90%. Temperatures reach 1,112 °F (600 °C). The heat transfer medium is air, which can reach temperatures of 752 °F (400 °C) – can produce steam for industrial processes, or it can supply district heating using a heat exchanger.

Research is evaluating sintered bauxite proppants as the thermal store, heating them up to 1000 °C. This material was tested against plasma-sprayed alumina and mullite, alumina fiber reinforced/alumina matrix and mullite fiber reinforced/mullite ceramic matrix composites. These four materials were considered because of their usefulness as solar receivers, transport tubes and storage tanks.

=== Latent heat storage ===
Because latent heat storage (LHS) is associated with a phase transition, the general term for the associated media is phase-change material (PCM). During these transitions, heat can be added or extracted without affecting the material's temperature, giving it an advantage over SHS-technologies. Storage capacities are often higher as well.

There are a multitude of PCMs available, including but not limited to salts, polymers, gels, paraffin waxes, metal alloys and semiconductor-metal alloys, each with different properties. This allows for a more target-oriented system design. As the process is isothermal at the PCM's melting point, the material can be picked to have the desired temperature range. Desirable qualities include high latent heat and thermal conductivity. Furthermore, the storage unit can be more compact if volume changes during the phase transition are small.

PCMs are further subdivided into organic, inorganic and eutectic materials. Compared to organic PCMs, inorganic materials are less flammable, cheaper and more widely available. They also have higher storage capacity and thermal conductivity. Organic PCMs, on the other hand, are less corrosive and not as prone to phase-separation. Eutectic materials, as they are mixtures, are more easily adjusted to obtain specific properties, but have low latent and specific heat capacities.

Another important factor in LHS is the encapsulation of the PCM. Some materials are more prone to erosion and leakage than others. The system must be carefully designed in order to avoid unnecessary loss of heat.

==== Miscibility gap alloy technology ====
Miscibility gap alloys rely on the phase change of a metallic material (see: latent heat) to store thermal energy.

Rather than pumping the liquid metal between tanks as in a molten-salt system, the metal is encapsulated in another metallic material that it cannot alloy with (immiscible). Depending on the two materials selected (the phase changing material and the encapsulating material) storage densities can be between 0.2 and 2 MJ/L.

A working fluid, typically water or steam, is used to transfer the heat into and out of the system. Thermal conductivity of miscibility gap alloys is often higher (up to 400 W/(m⋅K)) than competing technologies which means quicker "charge" and "discharge" of the thermal storage is possible. The technology has not yet been implemented on a large scale.

However, the miscibility gap alloy technology is being primarily implemented in Australia. This is where it was developed by University of Newcastle researchers, and is being brought to the market by the company MGA Thermal. Applications of this are slowly popping up around other parts of the world, such as a planned demonstration plant in Europe with a Swiss commercial partner to store renewable energy and provide clean power.

==== Ice-based technology ====
Several applications are being developed in which ice is produced during off-peak periods and used for cooling at a later time. For example, air conditioning can be provided more economically by using low-cost electricity at night to freeze water into ice, then using the cooling capacity of ice in the afternoon to reduce the electricity needed to handle air conditioning demands. Thermal energy storage using ice makes use of the large heat of fusion of water. Historically, ice was transported from mountains to cities for use as a coolant. One metric ton of water (= one cubic meter) can store 334 million joules (MJ) or 317,000 BTUs (93 kWh). A relatively small storage facility can hold enough ice to cool a large building for a day or a week.

Currently, ice storage air conditioning is being used globally with there being significant use in the United States in mostly hotels, commercial buildings and universities. Its other place of use is in China, specifically in public utilities in Shenzhen. Other places where it is being used but less notable would be in Japan, Turkey, and Malaysia (Song et al.). This technology is effective in areas with high cooling demand and areas with a distinguishable time of lower electricity rates, this is what the lower pricing is reliant upon. This allows for the storage of cold energy to be mainly produced during low-cost hours for use during high demand periods.

Disadvantages that this form of cold energy storing technology come with include high initial costs and the need for significant physical space of the large storage tanks. There may also be lower energy efficiency due to the chillers performing at lower temperatures in order to make ice.

In addition to using ice in direct cooling applications, it is also being used in heat pump-based heating systems. In these applications, the phase change energy provides a very significant layer of thermal capacity that is near the bottom range of temperature that water source heat pumps can operate in. This allows the system to ride out the heaviest heating load conditions and extends the timeframe by which the source energy elements can contribute heat back into the system.

==== Cryogenic energy storage ====
Cryogenic energy storage uses liquification of air or nitrogen as an energy store.

A pilot cryogenic energy system that uses liquid air as the energy store, and low-grade waste heat to drive the thermal re-expansion of the air, operated at a power station in Slough, UK in 2010.

Cryogenic Energy storage is a good option for energy use since it is able to be location independent. As long as there is the space needed for the storage of these containers, it would be possible to build. This energy storage is also known to have the ability for long storage duration, although it does have high costs for standalone systems. This makes sense because there is an essential high energy input needed for the liquefaction process of non-toxic materials.

=== Thermo-chemical heat storage ===
Thermo-chemical heat storage (TCS) involves some kind of reversible exotherm/endotherm chemical reaction with thermo-chemical materials (TCM) . Depending on the reactants, this method can allow for an even higher storage capacity than LHS.

In one type of TCS, heat is applied to decompose certain molecules. The reaction products are then separated, and mixed again when required, resulting in a release of energy. Some examples are the decomposition of potassium oxide (over a range of 300–800 °C, with a heat decomposition of 2.1 MJ/kg), lead oxide (300–350 °C, 0.26 MJ/kg) and calcium hydroxide (above 450 °C, where the reaction rates can be increased by adding zinc or aluminum). The photochemical decomposition of nitrosyl chloride can also be used and, since it needs photons to occur, works especially well when paired with solar energy.

==== Adsorption (or sorption) solar heating and storage ====
Adsorption processes also fall into this category. It can be used to not only store thermal energy, but also control air humidity. Zeolites (microporous crystalline alumina-silicates) and silica gels are well suited for this purpose. In hot, humid environments, this technology is often used in combination with lithium chloride to cool water.

The low cost ($200/ton) and high cycle rate (2,000×) of synthetic zeolites such as Linde 13X with water adsorbate has garnered much academic and commercial interest recently for use for thermal energy storage (TES), specifically of low-grade solar and waste heat. Several pilot projects have been funded in the EU from 2000 to the present (2020). The basic concept is to store solar thermal energy as chemical latent energy in the zeolite. Typically, hot dry air from flat plate solar collectors is made to flow through a bed of zeolite such that any water adsorbate present is driven off. Storage can be diurnal, weekly, monthly, or even seasonal depending on the volume of the zeolite and the area of the solar thermal panels. When heat is called for during the night, or sunless hours, or winter, humidified air flows through the zeolite. As the humidity is adsorbed by the zeolite, heat is released to the air and subsequently to the building space. This form of TES, with specific use of zeolites, was first taught by Guerra in 1978. Advantages over molten salts and other high temperature TES include that (1) the temperature required is only the stagnation temperature typical of a solar flat plate thermal collector, and (2) as long as the zeolite is kept dry, the energy is stored indefinitely. Because of the low temperature, and because the energy is stored as latent heat of adsorption, thus eliminating the insulation requirements of a molten salt storage system, costs are significantly lower.

Disadvantages of solar heating and storage include their lower energy density compared to other thermal energy systems and how relatively slow the energy transfer process is in the system known as the absorption bed. In addition, in order to keep maximum performance up, the system requires tedious maintenance of the controls. These controls manage factors such as humidity, temperature, and airflow which can alter operating conditions.

==== Salt hydrate technology ====
One example of an experimental storage system based on chemical reaction energy is the salt hydrate technology. The system uses the reaction energy created when salts are hydrated or dehydrated. It works by storing heat in a container containing 50% sodium hydroxide (NaOH) solution. Heat (e.g. from using a solar collector) is stored by evaporating the water in an endothermic reaction. When water is added again, heat is released in an exothermic reaction at 50 °C (120 °F). Current systems operate at 60% efficiency. The system is especially advantageous for seasonal thermal energy storage, because the dried salt can be stored at room temperature for prolonged times, without energy loss. The containers with the dehydrated salt can even be transported to a different location. The system has a higher energy density than heat stored in water and the capacity of the system can be designed to store energy from a few months to years.

In 2013 the Dutch technology developer TNO presented the results of the MERITS project to store heat in a salt container. The heat, which can be derived from a solar collector on a rooftop, expels the water contained in the salt. When the water is added again, the heat is released, with almost no energy losses. A container with a few cubic meters of salt could store enough of this thermochemical energy to heat a house throughout the winter. In a temperate climate like that of the Netherlands, an average low-energy household requires about 6.7 GJ/winter. To store this energy in water (at a temperature difference of 70 °C), 23 m^{3} insulated water storage would be needed, exceeding the storage abilities of most households. Using salt hydrate technology with a storage density of about 1 GJ/m^{3}, 4–8 m^{3} could be sufficient.

As of 2016, researchers in several countries are conducting experiments to determine the best type of salt, or salt mixture. Low pressure within the container seems favorable for the energy transport. Especially promising are organic salts, so called ionic liquids. Compared to lithium halide-based sorbents they are less problematic in terms of limited global resources and compared to most other halides and sodium hydroxide (NaOH) they are less corrosive and not negatively affected by CO_{2} contaminations.

Even though salts have several benefits, salt hydrate technology also has many downsides. This is because even though the use of organic salts and ionic liquids show potential in long term stability and cost effectiveness in large scale applications, the corrosive nature of the salts used, like potassium chloride, demand the use of specific and costly corrosion resistant materials. Salts also crystallize during the hydration and dehydration phases, which reduces their reactivity and eventually the entire system, this is yet another disadvantage of theirs. This technology is still undergoing further evaluation in order to be used more widely.

==== Molecular bonds ====
Storing energy in molecular bonds is being investigated. Energy densities equivalent to lithium-ion batteries have been achieved. This has been done by a DSPEC (dys-sensitized photoelectrosythesis cell). This is a cell that can store energy that has been acquired by solar panels during the day for night-time (or even later) use. It is designed by taking an indication from, well known, natural photosynthesis.

The DSPEC generates hydrogen fuel by making use of the acquired solar energy to split water molecules into its elements. As the result of this split, the hydrogen is isolated and the oxygen is released into the air. This sounds easier than it actually is. Four electrons of the water molecules need to be separated and transported elsewhere. Another difficult part is the process of merging the two separate hydrogen molecules.

The DSPEC consists of two components: a molecule and a nanoparticle. The molecule is called a chromophore-catalyst assembly which absorbs sunlight and kick starts the catalyst. This catalyst separates the electrons and the water molecules. The nanoparticles are assembled into a thin layer and a single nanoparticle has many chromophore-catalyst on it. The function of this thin layer of nanoparticles is to transfer away the electrons which are separated from the water. This thin layer of nanoparticles is coated by a layer of titanium dioxide. With this coating, the electrons that come free can be transferred more quickly so that hydrogen could be made. This coating is, again, coated with a protective coating that strengthens the connection between the chromophore-catalyst and the nanoparticle.

Using this method, the solar energy acquired from the solar panels is converted into fuel (hydrogen) without releasing the so-called greenhouse gasses. This fuel can be stored into a fuel cell and, at a later time, used to generate electricity.

==== Molecular solar thermal system ====
Another promising way to store solar energy for electricity and heat production is molecular solar thermal (MOST). This approach converts molecules by photoisomerization into a higher-energy isomer. Light (sunlight) converts one isomer into another. This second isomer stores the solar energy until the energy is released by a heat trigger or catalyst (converting the isomer into its original isomer).

One promising candidate for MOST is norbornadiene (NBD). This is because NBD exhibits a high energy difference between its typical form and its quadricyclane (QC) photoisomer, approximately 96 kJ/mol. For such systems, the donor-acceptor substitutions provide an effective means for red shifting the longest-wavelength absorption. This improves the match to the solar spectrum.

One challenge for a useful MOST system is to acquire sufficient energy storage density (higher than 300 kJ/kg). Another challenge is that light can be harvested in the visible region. The functionalization of the NBD with the donor and acceptor units is used to adjust this absorption maxima. However, this positive effect on absorption is offset by a higher molecular weight, reducing energy density. This positive effect on the solar absorption reduces the energy storage time when the absorption is redshifted. A possible solution is to couple one chromophore unit to several photo switches. In this case, it is advantageous to form dimers or trimers. The NBD share a common donor or acceptor.

One study tried to improve the stability of the high energy photoisomer by using two electronically coupled photo switches with separate barriers for thermal conversion. This caused a blue shift after the first isomerization (NBD-NBD to QC-NBD). This led to a higher energy of isomerization of the second switching event (QC-NBD to QC-QC). Another advantage of sharing a donor, is that the molecular weight per NBD unit is reduced, increasing energy density.

Eventually, this system could reach a quantum yield of photoconversion up 94%. Quantum yield is a measure of the efficiency of photon emission. With this system energy densities reached up to 559 kJ/kg.

In 2022, researchers reported combining MOST with a chip-sized thermoelectric generator to generate electricity from it. The system can reportedly store solar energy for up to 18 years and may be an option for renewable energy storage.

In 2026, researchers reported that a pyrimidone-based MOST system using a Dewar pyrimidone could provide multi-year storage at an energy density of 1.6 MJ/kg (444 Wh/kg).

== Thermal battery ==
A thermal energy battery is a physical structure used for the purpose of storing and releasing thermal energy. Such a thermal battery (a.k.a. TBat) allows energy available at one time to be temporarily stored and then released at another time. The basic principles involved in a thermal battery occur at the atomic level of matter, with energy being added to or taken from either a solid mass or a liquid volume which causes the substance's temperature to change. Some thermal batteries also involve causing a substance to transition thermally through a phase transition which causes even more energy to be stored and released due to the delta enthalpy of fusion or delta enthalpy of vaporization.

Thermal batteries are very common, and include such familiar items as a hot water bottle. Early examples of thermal batteries include stone and mud cooking stoves, rocks placed in fires, and kilns. While stoves and kilns are ovens, they are also thermal storage systems that depend on heat being retained for an extended period of time. Thermal energy storage systems can also be installed in domestic situations with heat batteries and thermal stores being amongst the most common types of energy storage systems installed at homes in the UK.

In 2026, Antora Energy and POET launched a 5 GWh thermal energy storage system beside POET’s ethanol plant in Big Stone City, South Dakota. It stores energy as heat in carbon blocks, using excess electricity including wind power, and supplies heat to the plant’s industrial processes.

=== Types of thermal batteries ===
Thermal batteries generally fall into 4 categories with different forms and applications, although fundamentally all are for the storage and retrieval of thermal energy. They also differ in method and density of heat storage.

==== Phase change thermal battery ====
Phase change materials used for thermal storage are capable of storing and releasing significant thermal capacity at the temperature that they change phase. These materials are chosen based on specific applications because there is a wide range of temperatures that may be useful in different applications and a wide range of materials that change phase at different temperatures. These materials include salts and waxes that are specifically engineered for the applications they serve. In addition to manufactured materials, water is a phase change material. The latent heat of water is 334 joules/gram. The phase change of water occurs at 0 °C (32 °F).

Some applications use the thermal capacity of water or ice as cold storage; others use it as heat storage. It can serve either application; ice can be melted to store heat then refrozen to warm an environment. The advantage of using a phase change in this way is that a given mass of material can absorb a large quantity of energy without its temperature changing. Hence a thermal battery that uses a phase change can be made lighter, or more energy can be put into it without raising the internal temperature unacceptably.

Common limitations that phase change batteries tend to have are their low thermal conductivity, which limits the rate of heat charging and discharging. However, the most recent advances in this technology is that these batteries have been altered to focus on improving their energy density abilities and cycle stability in order to improve their applications. This is being done by integrating phase change materials into the supporting structures of the batteries system. Phase change thermal batteries represent a promising and adaptable technology for efficient thermal energy management in multiple uses.

==== Encapsulated thermal battery ====
An encapsulated thermal battery is physically similar to a phase change thermal battery in that it is a confined amount of physical material which is thermally heated or cooled to store or extract energy. However, in a non-phase change encapsulated thermal battery, the temperature of the substance is changed without inducing a phase change. Since a phase change is not needed many more materials are available for use in an encapsulated thermal battery. One of the key properties of an encapsulated thermal battery is its volumetric heat capacity (VHC), also termed volume-specific heat capacity. Several substances are used for these thermal batteries, for example water, concrete, and wet or dry sand.

An example of an encapsulated thermal battery is a residential water heater with a storage tank. This thermal battery is usually slowly charged over a period of about 30–60 minutes for rapid use when needed (e.g., 10–15 minutes). Many utilities, understanding the "thermal battery" nature of water heaters, have begun using them to absorb excess renewable energy power when available for later use by the homeowner. According to the above-cited article, "net savings to the electricity system as a whole could be $200 per year per heater — some of which may be passed on to its owner".

A district heating storage using sand or stone operates in Pornainen in Finland, where a 1 MW / 100 MWh heat storage (using 2,000 tons of soapstone waste) is charged by surplus electricity, and can serve the area's heating demand for a week. It follows research with a prototype 0.1 MW / 8 MWh sand battery that was built in 2022 to store renewable solar and wind power as heat, for later use as district heating, and possible later power generation. In Canada, single building thermal storage also stores renewable solar and wind power as heat, for later use as space or water heating for the building in which it is installed. It differs from the system in Finland by being compact, using low pressure pumped fluids, and can only heat one building rather than several. It can take in waste heat from alternate sources such as computer server rooms or compost heaps and store it for later distribution.

==== Ground heat exchange thermal battery ====
Thermal battery
- Component type: Energy
- Working principle: Thermodynamics
- Inventor: Closed loop ground heat exchangers were invented by Dr. James Bose of Oklahoma State University, who created the International Ground Source Heat Pump Association to provide training on GHEX design and installation.
- First produced: GHEXs were first produced in the 1970s.

A ground heat exchanger (GHEX) is an area of the earth that is utilized as a seasonal/annual cycle thermal battery. These thermal batteries are areas of the earth into which pipes have been placed in order to transfer thermal energy. Energy is added to the GHEX by running a higher temperature fluid through the pipes and thus raising the temperature of the local earth. Energy can also be taken from the GHEX by running a lower-temperature fluid through those same pipes.

GHEX are usually implemented in two forms. The picture above depicts what is known as a "horizontal" GHEX, where trenching is used to place an amount of pipe in a closed loop in the ground. They are also formed by drilling boreholes into the ground, either vertically or horizontally, and then the pipes are inserted in the form of a closed-loop with a "u-bend" fitting on the far end of the loop.

Heat energy can be added to or removed from a GHEX at any point. However, they are most often used as a seasonal thermal energy storage operating on an annual cycle, where energy is extracted from a building during the summer season to cool a building and added to the GHEX. Then that same energy is later extracted from the GHEX in the winter season to heat the building. This annual cycle of energy addition and subtraction is highly predictable based on energy modelling of the building served. A thermal battery used in this mode is a renewable energy source as the energy extracted in the winter will be restored to the GHEX the next summer in a continually repeating cycle. This type is solar powered because it is the heat from the sun in the summer that is removed from a building and stored in the ground for use in the next winter season for heating. There are two main methods of thermal response testing that are used to characterize the thermal conductivity and thermal capacity/diffusivity of GHEX thermal batteries—log-time 1-dimensional curve fit, and the newly released advanced thermal response testing.

A good example of the annual cycle nature of a GHEX thermal Bbttery can be seen in the ASHRAE Building study. As seen there in the 'Ground Loop and Ambient Air temperatures by date' graphic (Figure 2–7), one can easily see the annual cycle sinusoidal shape of the ground temperature as heat is seasonally extracted from the ground in winter and rejected to the ground in summer, creating a ground "thermal charge" in one season that is not uncharged and driven the other direction from neutral until a later season. Other more advanced examples of Ground-based Thermal Batteries utilizing intentional well-bore thermal patterns are currently in research and early use. GHEXs are commonly used in thermal energy networks and networked geothermal.

==== Vertical ground thermal battery ====
Vertical Ground Thermal battery
- Component type: Energy
- Working principle: Thermodynamics
- Inventor: Invented in the 2010s by Oak Ridge National Lab's Thermal Energy Storage Research Group as led by Dr. Xiaobing Liu
- First produced: 2020s

Vertical ground thermal battery is a new form of large diameter bore ground heat exchanger (GHEX) combined with a fully buried tank that extends vertically into the earth, especially in the overburden area above bedrock. Forms of vertical thermal batteries were first created by the ORNL Thermal Energy Storage Research Group. This form of TES is especially valuable in areas with high water tables, effectively coupling a TES tank to a greater area surrounding the tank increasing is thermal storage effectiveness. This form of thermal battery is expected to be useful for thermal energy networks.

==== Molten-salt batteries ====
In the defense industry primary molten-salt batteries are termed "thermal batteries". They are non-rechargeable electrical batteries using a low-melting eutectic mixture of ionic metal salts (sodium, potassium and lithium chlorides, bromides, etc.) as the electrolyte, manufactured with the salts in solid form. As long as the salts remain solid, the battery has a long shelf life of up to 50 years. Once activated (usually by a pyrotechnic heat source) and the electrolyte melts, it is very reliable with a high energy and power density. They are extensively used for military applications such as small to large guided missiles, and nuclear weapons.

==== Other thermal batteries ====
There are other items that have historically been termed "thermal batteries", such as energy-storage heat packs that skiers use for keeping hands and feet warm (see hand warmer). These contain iron powder moist with oxygen-free salt water which rapidly corrodes over a period of hours, releasing heat, when exposed to air. Instant cold packs absorb heat by a non-chemical phase-change such as by absorbing the endothermic heat of solution of certain compounds.

The one common principle of these other thermal batteries is that the reaction involved is not reversible. Thus, these batteries are not used for storing and retrieving heat energy.

== Electric thermal storage ==
Storage heaters are commonplace in European homes with time-of-use metering (traditionally using cheaper electricity at nighttime). They consist of high-density ceramic bricks or feolite blocks heated to a high temperature with electricity and may or may not have good insulation and controls to release heat over a number of hours. Some advise not to use them in areas with young children or where there is an increased risk of fires due to poor housekeeping, both due to the high temperatures involved.

With the rise of wind and solar power (and other renewable energies) providing an ever increasing share of energy input into the electricity grids in some countries, the use of larger scale electric energy storage is being explored by several commercial companies. Ideally, the utilisation of surplus renewable energy is transformed into high temperature high grade heat in highly insulated heat stores, for release later when needed. An emerging technology is the use of vacuum super insulated (VSI) heat stores. The use of electricity to generate heat, and not say direct heat from solar thermal collectors, means that very high temperatures can be realised, potentially allowing for inter seasonal heat transfer—storing high grade heat in summer from surplus photovoltaics generation into heat stored for the following winter with relatively minimal standing losses.

== Solar energy storage ==
Solar energy is an application of thermal energy storage. Most practical solar thermal storage systems provide storage from a few hours to a day's worth of energy. However, a growing number of facilities use seasonal thermal energy storage (STES), enabling solar energy to be stored in summer to heat space during winter. In 2017 Drake Landing Solar Community in Alberta, Canada, achieved a year-round 97% solar heating fraction, a world record made possible by incorporating STES.

The combined use of latent heat and sensible heat are possible with high temperature solar thermal input. Various eutectic metal mixtures, such as aluminum and silicon (AlSi_{12}) offer a high melting point suited to efficient steam generation, while high alumina cement-based materials offer good storage capabilities.

== Pumped-heat electricity storage ==
In pumped-heat electricity storage (PHES), a reversible heat-pump system is used to store energy as a temperature difference between two heat stores.

=== Isentropic ===
Isentropic systems involve two insulated containers filled, for example, with crushed rock or gravel: a hot vessel storing thermal energy at high temperature/pressure, and a cold vessel storing thermal energy at low temperature/pressure. The vessels are connected at top and bottom by pipes and the whole system is filled with an inert gas such as argon.

While charging, the system can use off-peak electricity to work as a heat pump. One prototype used argon at ambient temperature and pressure from the top of the cold store is compressed adiabatically, to a pressure of, for example, 12 bar, heating it to around 500 °C (900 °F). The compressed gas is transferred to the top of the hot vessel where it percolates down through the gravel, transferring heat to the rock and cooling to ambient temperature. The cooled, but still pressurized, gas emerging at the bottom of the vessel is then adiabatically expanded to 1 bar, which lowers its temperature to −150 °C. The cold gas is then passed up through the cold vessel where it cools the rock while warming to its initial condition.

The energy is recovered as electricity by reversing the cycle. The hot gas from the hot vessel is expanded to drive a generator and then supplied to the cold store. The cooled gas retrieved from the bottom of the cold store is compressed which heats the gas to ambient temperature. The gas is then transferred to the bottom of the hot vessel to be reheated.

The compression and expansion processes are provided by a specially designed reciprocating machine using sliding valves. Surplus heat generated by inefficiencies in the process is shed to the environment through heat exchangers during the discharging cycle.

The developer claimed that a round trip efficiency of 72–80% was achievable. This compares to >80% achievable with pumped hydro energy storage.

Another proposed system uses turbomachinery and is capable of operating at much higher power levels. Use of phase change material as heat storage material could enhance performance.

== See also ==
- Carnot battery
- Geothermal energy
- Geothermal power
- Ice storage air conditioning
- Lamm-Honigmann process
- List of energy storage power plants
- Pumpable ice technology
- Pumped-storage hydroelectricity
- Steam accumulator
