= Perlaza =

Perlaza is a surname. Notable people with the name include:

- Baldomero Perlaza (born 1992), Colombian professional footballer
- Carlos Perlaza (born 1983), Colombian footballer
- Flavio Perlaza (born 1952), Ecuadorian footballer
- Jhon Perlaza (born 1994), Colombian sprinter
- Jonathan Perlaza (born 1997), Ecuadorian footballer
- Jorge Perlaza (born 1985), Colombian footballer
- José Luis Perlaza (born 1981), Ecuadoran former footballer
- Pedro Perlaza (born 1991), Ecuadorian footballer
- Santiago Martinez Perlaza (born 1998), Colombian footballer

== See also ==
- Parleza (disambiguation)
