= Dymer =

Dymer may refer to:

- Dymer, Poland
- Dymer, Kyiv Oblast, Ukraine
- Dymer (poem), by C. S. Lewis

== See also ==
- Dimer (disambiguation)
