= Parleza =

Parleza may refer to the following places in Poland:

- Parleza Mała
- Parleza Wielka
