= JUB1 =

Plant transcriptional regulator

JUNGBRUNNEN1

Identifiers
- Organism: Arabidopsis thaliana
- Symbol: JUB1
- Alt. symbols: ATNAC042, NAC042
- Entrez: 818902
- Orthologs: NCBI: entry
- RefSeq (Prot): AEC10196.1

Other data
- Chromosome: 2: 17.88 - 17.88 Mb

JUB1 plant transcriptional regulator

JUNGBRUNNEN1 (JUB1 / ATNAC042) is a transcription factor in the plant Arabidopsis thaliana. It is involved in senescence and stress responses including drought tolerance and thermotolerance.

== Genomic location ==
JUB1 is encoded on chromosome 2 from 17880457 to 17882636 on the reversed DNA strand. The JUB1 gene has two known transcripts, encoding the JUB1 protein of 275 amino acids and an alternative spliced variant that misses the first 78 amino acids of JUB1.

== Protein architecture ==
The JUB1 protein contains a conserved no apical meristem (NAM) domain, that is predicted to include a dimerisation region, DNA binding region and two nuclear localisation signal (NLS) regions.

== Function ==
JUB1 is one of the main regulators of stress response in Arabidopsis thaliana and JUB1 homologs display similar functions in other plants. JUB1 expression is elevated under drought, heat, cold, high salt concentration and other stresses.

Besides, JUB1 is a repressor of aging, hence the name JUNGBRUNNEN (Fountain of youth in German). Furthermore, JUB1 is involved in immune responses to plant pathogens.
