= Thermal energy network =

District heating and cooling system using shared geothermal loops

A thermal energy network (TEN) is a type of district heating and cooling system in which a shared water loop exchanges heat with the ground, often through shallow geothermal boreholes, with connections to multiple buildings which utilize heat pumps for heating, cooling, and potentially water heating. In the important ANSI/CSA/IGSHPA C448 Design and Installation standard, these systems have been termed district energy systems.

Thermal Energy Network example, exchanging thermal energy among sources and sinks to provide building heating and cooling.

Unlike conventional district heating systems that distribute steam or high-temperature water from a central plant, thermal energy networks generally circulate water at relatively low or ambient temperatures. Individual buildings use water-source heat pumps to raise or lower temperatures for space heating, cooling, and sometimes domestic hot water. In technical and policy literature, thermal energy networks are commonly described as part of fifth-generation district heating and cooling.

Thermal energy networks are a general class of networked thermal systems that can draw on whatever thermal sources and sinks are locally available. Included are both 5th generation systems such as are being installed in many cities now and the emerging 6th generation grid-cooperating thermal systems moving now from research to implementation.

== Ambient temperature loop ==
The core of a TEN is the Ambient Temperature piping loop that conveys thermal fluid between the various thermal sources and sinks. The specific term "Ambient Temperature Loop (ATL)" can also refer to the specific 1-pipe configuration being adopted by some universities, cities, and utilities.

One such example is the 1-pipe geothermal network that heats and cools Colorado Mesa University (CMU). Another is the 1st utility installed TEN in Framingham, MA.

== Terminology ==
The terminology used for thermal energy networks varies by jurisdiction and source. In engineering literature, similar systems are described as district energy systems, geothermal district energy systems, ambient-temperature loop districts, and 5th Generation district heating and cooling systems.

In U.S. media, policy, and utility contexts, such systems have also been described as networked geothermal.

== Design and operation ==
Thermal energy networks are designed to serve the goals of reliability, resilience, efficiency/cost-effectiveness, and up front cost reduction. All available thermal loads and sources/sinks are identified, then the most cost-effective sources and sinks are chosen.

One typical thermal source/sink is a ground heat exchanger, a.k.a. "geothermal". This is because the ground is a huge thermal mass which can be used as a thermal battery to transfer energy from one season to another. Other sources/sinks might be area industry, flood control ponds, solar thermal, snow melt loops, and both indoor and ground thermal batteries.

Thermal energy networks consist of a shared buried pipe loop carrying water or a water-antifreeze solution, a set of geothermal boreholes or other thermal source and link exchangers, pumps and controls, and building-level water-source heat pumps.

In many designs, the network loop operates near ground temperature rather than at the higher temperatures used in earlier district heating systems. Buildings needing heat extract it from the loop through heat pumps, while buildings needing cooling reject heat back into the loop. Because heating and cooling loads may occur at different times across a district, some systems are designed to exchange heat between buildings and to use the ground for thermal energy storage or seasonal thermal energy storage.

== Ambient thermal loop developments ==
District-scale geothermal heating and cooling systems predate the recent use of the term thermal energy network, but the concept received increased attention in the 2020s as part of building decarbonization policy in the United States.

In Massachusetts, Eversource Energy developed a pilot 5th generation geothermal energy network in Framingham, Massachusetts. A 2025 PBS NewsHour report described it as a one-mile system connecting about three dozen homes and municipal buildings to a shared geothermal bore field. Independent reporting by Grist also described the Framingham project as a networked geothermal system serving residential and commercial buildings through shared underground infrastructure. The Framingham project was presented in reporting as an early test of whether gas utilities could shift part of their business from natural gas distribution to shared thermal infrastructure.

== Policy and regulation ==
In the United States, geothermal networks have increasingly been discussed in relation to utility regulation, labor transition, and building electrification. In 2022, New York enacted the Utility Thermal Energy Network and Jobs Act, establishing a legal and regulatory framework for utility thermal energy networks. The legislation described thermal energy networks as ambient-temperature water loops connecting multiple buildings and energy sources, with building owners connecting through water-source heat pumps.

In July 2024, the New York State Public Service Commission adopted initial rules for utility thermal energy networks. Maryland enacted legislation in 2024 authorizing thermal energy network systems. Massachusetts issued state guidance for networked geothermal projects in 2024.

== Applications ==
Thermal energy networks have been proposed or deployed in university campuses, mixed-use developments, housing complexes, and neighborhood-scale utility pilots. According to PBS NewsHour, the Framingham pilot served detached houses as well as a school administration building, a fire station, and a public housing development.

These systems are used mainly for space heating, air conditioning, domestic hot water, and load balancing between buildings with different thermal demands.

== 6th-generation thermal systems ==
The emerging 6th-generation heating and cooling TEN field advances the field by integrating active distributed energy resources with thermal energy storage elements of the system to both absorb and avoid energy in sync with grid power costs. A key to these systems is the use of "thermal batteries" smaller than the ground thermal battery that is the geothermal ground heat exchanger (GHEX). A GHEX is a very effective annual cycle thermal storage mechanism. However, it is slow to charge and slow to drain. Grid interactivity requires faster thermal charge and discharge cycling, and thus thermal batteries designed for shorter thermal cycling. The work of ORNL's Thermal Energy Storage Research Group is central to 6th generation TEN systems.

== Limitations and considerations ==
The performance and economics of geothermal networks depend on local geology, drilling conditions, load diversity, building retrofit requirements, and financing structure. Other issues discussed in the literature include capital cost, street excavation and siting constraints, coordination among property owners and utilities, and the regulatory treatment of thermal service. It is important that careful design of TEN systems is undertaken to avoid cost overruns or operational issues.

== See also ==
- District heating
- District cooling
- Ground-source heat pump
- Geothermal heating
- Thermal energy storage
- Seasonal thermal energy storage
