= Biskupiec-Kolonia Trzecia =

- Village
- Location within Poland
- Coordinates: 53°52′3.5″N 20°55′55″E
- Country: Poland
- Voivodeship: Warmian-Masurian
- County: Olsztyn
- Gmina: Biskupiec
- Population: 58

Biskupiec-Kolonia Trzecia [bisˈkupjɛt͡s kɔˈlɔɲa ˈtʂɛt͡ɕa] is a village in the administrative district of Gmina Biskupiec, within Olsztyn County, Warmian-Masurian Voivodeship, in northern Poland.
