= Józefowo, Olsztyn County =

Józefowo
- Settlement
- Location within Poland
- Coordinates: 53°48′49″N 20°55′02″E
- Country: Poland
- Voivodeship: Warmian-Masurian
- County: Olsztyn
- Gmina: Biskupiec
- Population: 20

Józefowo (Polish: [juzɛˈfɔvɔ]; German: Josephshof) is a settlement in the administrative district of Gmina Biskupiec, within Olsztyn County, Warmian-Masurian Voivodeship, in northern Poland.
