= Węgój =

- Village
- Location within Poland
- Coordinates: 53°56′N 20°59′E
- Country: Poland
- Voivodeship: Warmian-Masurian
- County: Olsztyn
- Gmina: Biskupiec
- Website: http://www.wegoj.prv.pl/ oficjalna strona Węgoja

Węgój [ˈvɛnɡui̯] is a village in the administrative district of Gmina Biskupiec, within Olsztyn County, Warmian-Masurian Voivodeship, in northern Poland. Węgój holds a recreation of the Crucifixion of Jesus every Easter.
