= Rasząg =

- Village
- Location within Poland
- Coordinates: 53°47′34″N 20°54′31″E
- Country: Poland
- Voivodeship: Warmian-Masurian
- County: Olsztyn
- Gmina: Biskupiec

Rasząg [ˈraʂɔnk] is a village in the administrative district of Gmina Biskupiec, within Olsztyn County, Warmian-Masurian Voivodeship, in northern Poland.
