= Gmina Biskupiec, Olsztyn County =

Gmina Biskupiec Biskupiec Commune
- Gmina
- Flag Coat of arms
- Interactive map of Gmina Biskupiec
- Coordinates (Biskupiec): 53°51′N 20°57′E
- Country: Poland
- Voivodeship: Warmian-Masurian
- County: Olsztyn County
- Seat: Biskupiec

Area
  - Total: 290.38 km^{2} (112.12 sq mi)

Population (2006)
  - Total: 19,018
  - Density: 65.493/km^{2} (169.63/sq mi)
  - Urban: 10,348
  - Rural: 8,670
- Website: www.biskupiec.pl

Gmina Biskupiec is an urban-rural gmina (administrative district) in Olsztyn County, Warmian-Masurian Voivodeship, in northern Poland. Its seat is the town of Biskupiec, which lies approximately 31 kilometres (19 mi) east of the regional capital Olsztyn.

The gmina covers an area of 290.38 square kilometres (112.1 sq mi), and as of 2006 its total population is 19,018, of which the population of Biskupiec is 10,348, and the population of the rural part of the gmina is 8,670.

== Villages ==
Apart from the town of Biskupiec, Gmina Biskupiec contains the villages and settlements of Adamowo, Biesówko, Biesowo, Biskupiec-Kolonia Druga, Biskupiec-Kolonia Pierwsza, Biskupiec-Kolonia Trzecia, Boreczek, Borki Wielkie, Botowo, Bredynki, Bukowa Góra, Chmielówka, Czerwonka, Dębowo, Droszewo, Dworzec, Dymer, Gęsikowo, Januszewo, Józefowo, Kamionka, Kobułty, Kojtryny, Kramarka, Łabuchy, Labuszewo, Łąka Dymerska, Lipowo, Mojtyny, Najdymowo, Nasy, Nowe Marcinkowo, Parleza Mała, Parleza Wielka, Pierwój, Pudląg, Rasząg, Rozwady, Rudziska, Rukławki, Rzeck, Sadłowo, Sadowo, Stanclewo, Stryjewo, Węgój, Wilimy, Wólka Wielka, Zabrodzie, Zameczek, Zarębiec, Zawada and Zazdrość.

== Neighbouring gminas ==
Gmina Biskupiec is bordered by the gminas of Barczewo, Dźwierzuty, Jeziorany, Kolno and Sorkwity.
