= Biskupiec-Kolonia Druga =

- Village
- Location within Poland
- Coordinates: 53°51′57″N 21°0′44″E
- Country: Poland
- Voivodeship: Warmian-Masurian
- County: Olsztyn
- Gmina: Biskupiec

Biskupiec-Kolonia Druga [bisˈkupjɛt͡s kɔˈlɔɲa ˈdruɡa] is a village in the administrative district of Gmina Biskupiec, within Olsztyn County, Warmian-Masurian Voivodeship, in northern Poland.
