= Chmielówka, Olsztyn County =

Chmielówka
- Village
- Location within Poland
- Coordinates: 53°47′13″N 21°3′37″E
- Country: Poland
- Voivodeship: Warmian-Masurian
- County: Olsztyn
- Gmina: Biskupiec
- Population: 71

Chmielówka ([xmjɛˈlufka]; German: Chmielowken, 1938–45 Neumoithienen) is a village in the administrative district of Gmina Biskupiec, within Olsztyn County, Warmian-Masurian Voivodeship, in northern Poland.
