= Cold district heating =

District heating with very low temperatures

Schematic function of a cold district heating network

Cold district heating is a technical variant of a district heating network that operates at low transmission temperatures well below those of conventional district heating systems and can provide both space heating and cooling. Transmission temperatures in the range of approx. 10 to 25 °C (50–77 °F) are common, allowing different consumers to heat and cool simultaneously and independently of each other. Hot water is produced and the building heated by water heat pumps, which obtain their thermal energy from the heating network, while cooling can be provided either directly via the cold heat network or, if necessary, indirectly via chillers. Cold local heating is sometimes also referred to as an anergy network. The collective term for such systems in scientific terminology is 5th generation district heating and cooling (5GDHC). Due to the possibility of being operated entirely by renewable energies and at the same time contributing to balancing the fluctuating production of wind turbines and photovoltaic systems, cold local heating networks are considered a promising option for a sustainable, potentially greenhouse gas and emission-free heat supply.

== Terms ==
As of 2019, the fifth generation heating networks described here have not yet been given a uniform name, and there are also various definitions for the general technical concept. In the English language technical literature the terms Low temperature District Heating and Cooling (LTDHC), Low temperature networks (LTN), Cold District Heating (CDH) and Anergy networks or Anergy grid are used. In addition, some publications have definitional conflicts in the delimitation to "warm" district heating networks, because certain authors consider Low temperature District Heating and Cooling as well as Ultra-low temperature District Heating as subforms of 4th generation district heating. In addition, the definition of so-called low-ex networks allows to classify them as both fourth and fifth generation.

== History ==
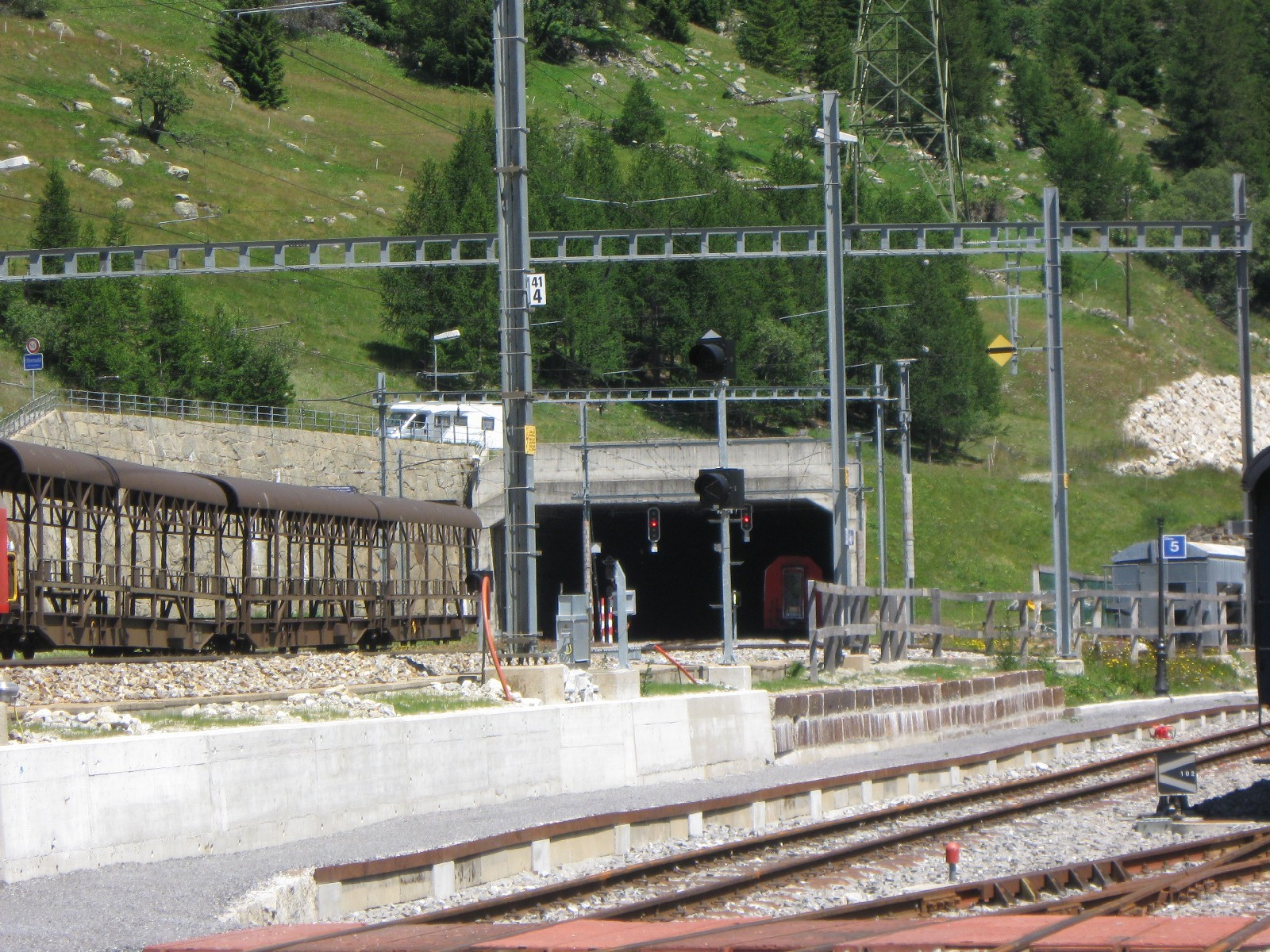
One of the first cold local heating networks uses seepage water from the Furka Base Tunnel as a heat source

The first cold district heating network is the heating network in Arzberg in Upper Franconia, Germany. In the Arzberg power station there, which has since been shut down, uncooled cooling water was taken from between the turbine condenser and the cooling tower and piped to various buildings, where it was then used as a heat source for heat pumps. This was used to heat the school and the swimming pool in addition to various residential buildings and commercial enterprises.

Another very early plant was put into operation in Wulfen in 1979. There, 71 buildings were supplied with heat energy, which was taken from the groundwater. Finally, in 1994, the first cold heating network was opened, using waste heat from an industrial company, a textile company. Also in 1994 (according to Pellegrini and Bianchini already in 1991) a cold local heating network was built in the Swiss village Oberwald, which is operated with seepage water from the Furka base tunnel.

As of January 2018, a total of 40 schemes were in operation in Europe, 15 each in Germany and Switzerland. Most of the projects were pilot plants with a heat output of several 100 kWth up to the single-digit MW range, the largest plant had an output of approx. 10 MWth. In the 2010s about three plants per year were added.

== Concept ==
Cold heat networks are heat networks that are operated at very low temperatures (usually between 10 and 25 °C). They can be fed from a variety of frequently regenerative heat sources and allow the simultaneous production of heat and cold. Since the operating temperatures are not sufficient for the production of hot water and heating heat, the temperature at the consumer is raised to the required level by means of heat pumps. In the same way, cold can be produced and the waste heat can be fed back into the heating network. In this way, connected consumers are not only customers, but can also act as prosumers, who can either consume or produce heat depending on the circumstances.

The concept of cold local heating networks is derived from groundwater heat pumps as well as open-loop heat pumps. While the former are mainly used to supply individual houses, the latter are often found in commercial buildings which have both heating and cooling needs and have to meet these needs in parallel. Cold local heating extends this concept to individual residential areas or districts. Like ordinary geothermal heat pumps, cold local heating networks have the advantage over air heat pumps of operating more efficiently due to the lower temperature difference between the heat source and the heating temperature. However, compared to geothermal heat pumps, cold local heating networks have the additional advantage that even in urban areas, where space problems often prevent the use of geothermal heat pumps, heat can be stored seasonally via central heat storage, and in addition, the different load profiles of different buildings may allow a balance between heating and cooling requirements.

Cold district heating is particularly suitable where there are different types of buildings (residential, commercial, supermarkets, etc.) and therefore there is a demand for both heating and cooling, enabling energy balancing over short or long periods of time. Alternatively, seasonal heat storage systems allow for a balance of energy supply and demand. By using different (waste) heat sources and combining heat sources and heat sinks, synergies can also be created and the heat supply can be further developed in the direction of a circular economy. In addition, the low operating temperature of the cold-heating networks makes it possible to feed otherwise hardly usable low-temperature waste heat into the network in an uncomplicated manner. At the same time, the low operating temperature significantly reduces the heat losses of the heating network, which limits the energy losses, especially in summer, when there is little demand for heat. The annual performance factor of heat pumps is also relatively high, especially compared to air-sourced heat pumps. A study of 40 systems commissioned up to 2018 showed that the heat pumps achieved an seasonal COP of at least 4 for the majority of the systems studied; the highest seasonal COP values were about 6.

Technologically, cold heat networks are part of the concept of smart heat networks.

== Components ==
=== Heat sources ===
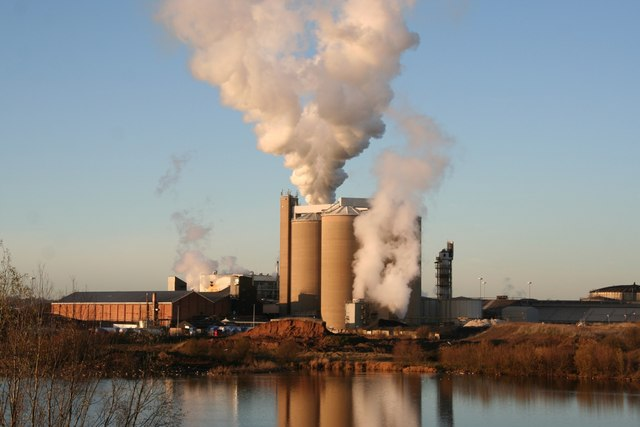
Cold heating networks are ideally suited for the use of waste heat from industry and commercial buildings

Various heat sources can be used as energy suppliers for the cold heating network, in particular renewable sources such as the ground, water, commercial and industrial waste heat, solar thermal energy and ambient air, which can be used individually or in combination. Due to the generally modular design of cold local heating networks, new heat sources can be gradually developed as the network is further expanded, so that larger heating networks can be fed from a variety of different sources.

In practice almost inexhaustible sources are e.g. sea water, rivers, lakes or groundwater. Of the 40 cold heating networks in operation in Europe as of January 2018, 17 used water bodies or groundwater as a heat source. The second most important heat source was geothermal energy. This is usually accessed via geothermal boreholes using vertical borehole heat exchangers. However, it is also possible to use surface collectors such as agrothermal collectors. In this case, horizontal collectors are ploughed into agricultural land at a depth of 1.5 to 2 m, i.e. below the working depth of agricultural machines, which can extract heat from the soil as required. This concept, which allows further agricultural use, has been realized, for example, in a cold heat network in the German town Wüstenrot.

In addition, there are cold-heating networks that extract geothermal energy from tunnels and abandoned coal mines. Waste heat from industrial and commercial enterprises can also be used. For example, two cold-heating networks in Aurich and Herford use waste heat from dairies and another plant in Switzerland uses waste heat from a biomass power plant, while another cold-heating network uses waste heat from a textile company. Other possible heat sources include solar thermal energy (especially for regenerating geothermal sources and charging storage tanks), large heat pumps that use environmental heat, the sewage system, combined heat and power plants and biomass- or fossil-fired peak load boilers to support other heat sources. The low operating temperatures of cold-heating networks are particularly favourable to solar thermal systems, CHP units and waste heat recovery, as these can operate at maximum efficiency under these conditions. At the same time, cold heating networks enable industrial and commercial companies with waste heat potential, such as supermarkets and data centres, to feed thermal energy into the grid without any major financial investment risk, since at the temperature level of cold heating networks, direct heat feed is possible without a heat pump.

Another heat source can also be the return line of conventional district heating networks. If the operating temperature of the cold heating network is lower than the soil temperature, the network itself can also absorb heat from the surrounding soil. In this case the network then acts as a kind of geothermal collector.

=== Seasonal heat storage ===
Function of a geothermal heat collector. These collectors can also be used for seasonal storage.

Heat storage in the form of seasonal storage is a key element of cold local heating systems. To balance seasonal fluctuations in heat production and consumption, many cold heating systems are built with seasonal heat storage. This is particularly suitable where the structure of the consumers/prosumers does not lead to a largely balanced heat and cooling demand or where there is no sufficient heat source available all year round. Aquifer reservoirs and storage via borehole fields are well suited. These make it possible to store excess heat from the summer half of the year, e.g. from cooling, but also from other heat sources and thus heat up the ground. During the heating period, the process is then reversed and heated water is pumped and fed into the cold heat network. Other types of heat storage are also possible, however. For example, a cold heating network in Fischerbach uses an ice storage.

=== Heat network ===
Cold local heating systems allow a variety of network configurations. A rough distinction can be made between open systems, in which water is fed in, passed through the network where it is supplied to the respective consumers and finally released into the environment, and closed systems, in which a carrier fluid, usually brine, circulates in a circuit. The systems can also be differentiated according to the number of pipelines used. Depending on the respective conditions, configurations with one to four pipes are possible:

- Single-pipe systems are usually used in open systems that use surface or ground water as a heat source and release it back into the environment after flowing through the heating network.
- In two-pipe systems, both pipes are operated at different temperatures. In heating operation, the warmer of the two serves as a heat source for the heat pumps of the consumers, while the colder one absorbs the transfer medium cooled by the heat pump. In cooling mode, the colder one serves as the source, the heat produced by the heat pump is fed into the warmer pipe.
- Three-pipe systems work similarly to two-pipe systems, but there is also a third pipe that is operated with warmer water, so that (at least in the case of heating systems with a low flow temperature, such as underfloor heating) heating can take place without using the heat pump. The heat is usually transferred via heat exchangers. Depending on the temperature, the heat is then fed back into the warmer or colder pipe after use. Alternatively, the third pipe can also be used as a cooling pipe for direct cooling via heat exchanger.
- Four-pipe systems function like three-pipe systems, except that there is one pipe each for direct heating and cooling. In this way, energy cascades can be realised.

In general, the pipelines of cold heating networks can be designed in a simpler and cheaper way than in warm/hot district heating systems. Due to the low operating temperatures, there is no thermomechanical stress, which allows the use of ordinary polyethylene pipes without insulation, as used for drinking water supply. This allows both a quick and cost-effective installation and quick adaptation to different network geometries. It also eliminates the need for expensive X-ray or ultrasound examinations of the pipes, the welding of individual pipes and the time-consuming on-site insulation of connecting pieces. However, compared to conventional district heating pipes, pipes with a larger diameter must be used to transport the same amount of heat. The energy requirement of the pumps is also higher due to the larger volumes. On the other hand, cold local heating systems can potentially be installed where the heat demand of the connected buildings is too low to operate a conventional heating network. In 2018, for example, 9 out of 16 systems for which sufficient data was available were below the threshold of 1.2 kW heat output/m grid length, which is considered the lower limit for the economic operation of conventional "warm" local heating systems.

=== Substation ===
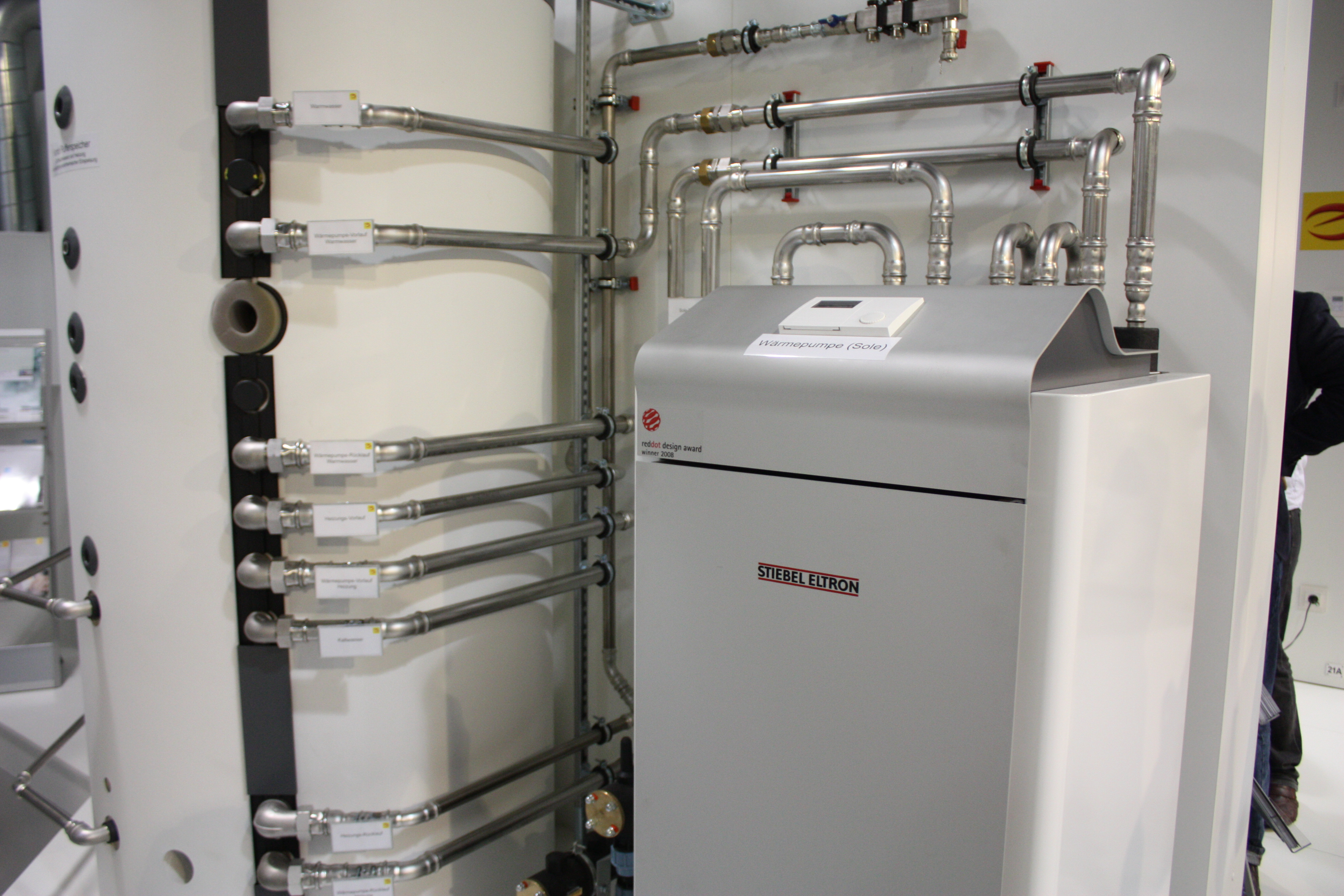
Water-sourced heat pump

Compared to conventional "hot" district heating networks, the substation of cold local heating systems is more complicated, takes up more space and is therefore more expensive. A heat pump as well as a direct hot water storage tank must be installed at each connected consumer or prosumer. The heat pump is usually designed as an electrically driven water-to-water heat pump and is also often physically separated from the cold heat network by a heat exchanger. The heat pump raises the temperature to the level required to heat the dwelling and produces hot water, but it can also be used to cool the house and feed the heat produced there into the heating network, unless cooling is done directly without the use of a heat pump. A back-up system such as a heating element can also be installed. A heat storage tank for the heating system can also be installed, which enables more flexible operation of the heat pump. Such heat storage tanks also help to keep the heat pump small, which in turn reduces installation costs.

== Role in future energy systems ==
Low-temperature heating networks, which include cold local heating systems, are regarded as a central element for the decarbonisation of heat supply in the context of energy system transformation and Climate change mitigation. Local and district heating systems have various advantages compared to individual heating systems: These include, for example, the higher efficiency of the systems, the possibility of using combined heat and power generation and exploiting previously unused waste heat potentials. In addition, they are seen as an important approach to increasing the use of renewable energy sources and reducing primary energy requirements and local emissions in heat generation. By dispensing with combustion technologies for feeding into the cold heat network, carbon dioxide emissions and local pollutant emissions can be completely avoided. Cold heat networks are also seen as an opportunity to build up heat networks in the future that are fed 100% by renewable energy sources.

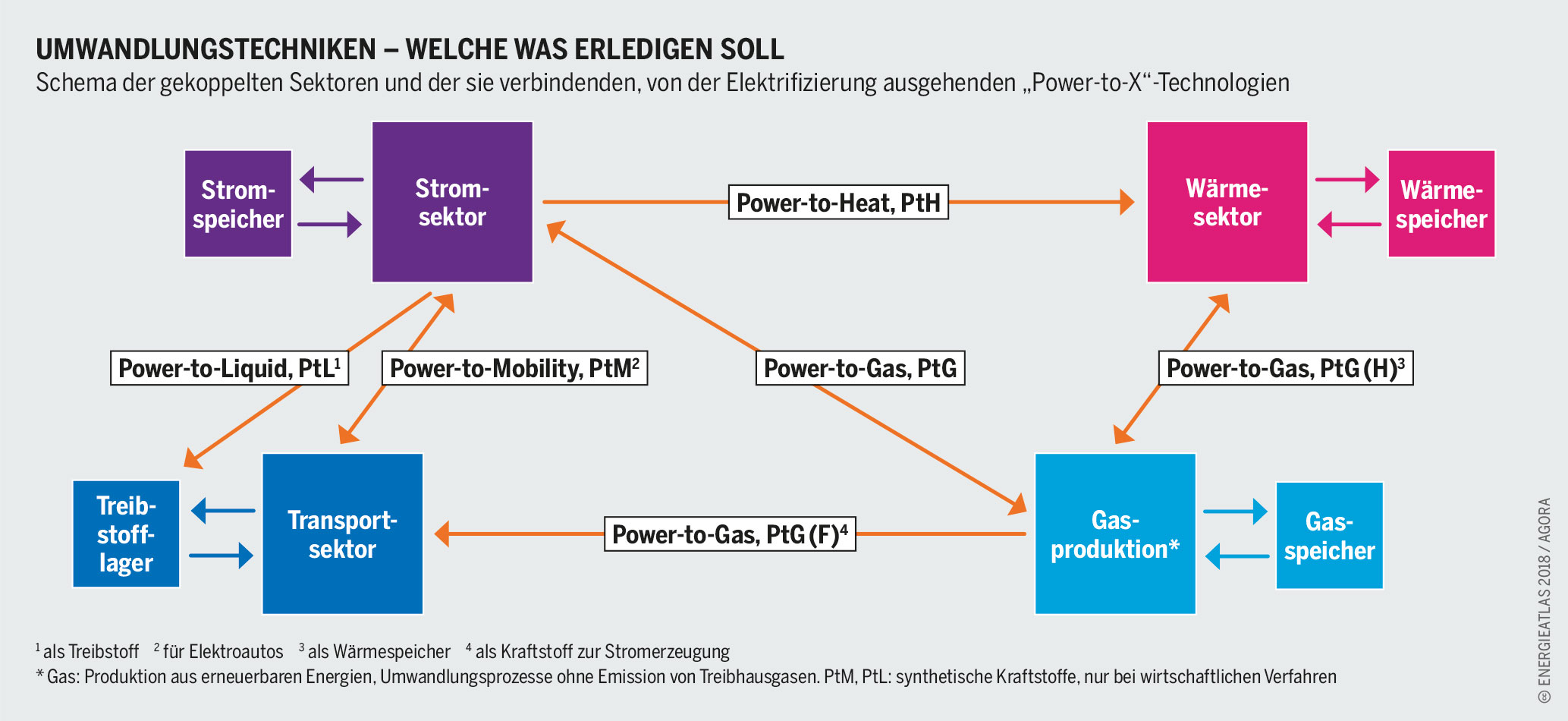
The extensive electrification of the heat sector is a central component of sector coupling

Another promising approach is the use of cold local heating systems and other heat pump heating systems for sector coupling. Thus, power-to-heat technologies on the one hand use electrical energy for heating, and on the other hand the heating sector can help to provide the system services to compensate for the fluctuating green electricity production in the electricity sector. Cold local heating networks can thus contribute to load control via heat pumps and, together with other storage systems, help to ensure security of supply.

If the roofs of the buildings supplied are equipped with photovoltaic systems, it is also possible to obtain part of the electricity required for the heat pumps from the roof of the consumer. For example, 20 PlusEnergy houses have been built in Wüstenrot, all of which are equipped with photovoltaic systems, a solar battery and a heat storage tank for the highest possible degree of self-supply through flexible operation of the heat pump.

== See also ==
- Networked geothermal

== External links to examples ==
- Mijnwater Heerlen
- Schleswig Kalte Nahwärme
- List of cold district heating networks
- »Kaltes« Nahwärmenetz spart 40.000 kg CO2 im Jahr. Energieagentur NRW. Retrieved 13 March 2017.
- Kalte Nahwärme in Dorsten: Pionierprojekt mit Wärmepumpen läuft seit vier Jahrzehnten und bleibt weiter im Rennen. In: EE-News, 14 November 2019. Retrieved 28 June 2020.
