= Adamowo, Olsztyn County =

Adamowo
- Village
- Location within Poland
- Coordinates: 53°52′55″N 20°58′28″E
- Country: Poland
- Voivodeship: Warmian-Masurian
- County: Olsztyn
- Gmina: Biskupiec

Adamowo ([adaˈmɔvɔ]; German: Adamshof) is a village in the administrative district of Gmina Biskupiec, within Olsztyn County, Warmian-Masurian Voivodeship, in northern Poland.
