= Boreczek, Warmian-Masurian Voivodeship =

Boreczek
- Settlement
- Location within Poland
- Coordinates: 53°54′44″N 20°49′5″E
- Country: Poland
- Voivodeship: Warmian-Masurian
- County: Olsztyn
- Gmina: Biskupiec
- Population: 1

Boreczek ([bɔˈrɛt͡ʂɛk]; German: Heide) is a settlement in the administrative district of Gmina Biskupiec, within Olsztyn County, Warmian-Masurian Voivodeship, in northern Poland.
