= Wólka Wielka =

- Settlement
- Location within Poland
- Coordinates: 53°57′N 20°57′E
- Country: Poland
- Voivodeship: Warmian-Masurian
- County: Olsztyn
- Gmina: Biskupiec
- Population: 20

Wólka Wielka [ˈvulka ˈvjɛlka] is a settlement in the administrative district of Gmina Biskupiec, within Olsztyn County, Warmian-Masurian Voivodeship, in northern Poland.
