= Kobułty =

- Village
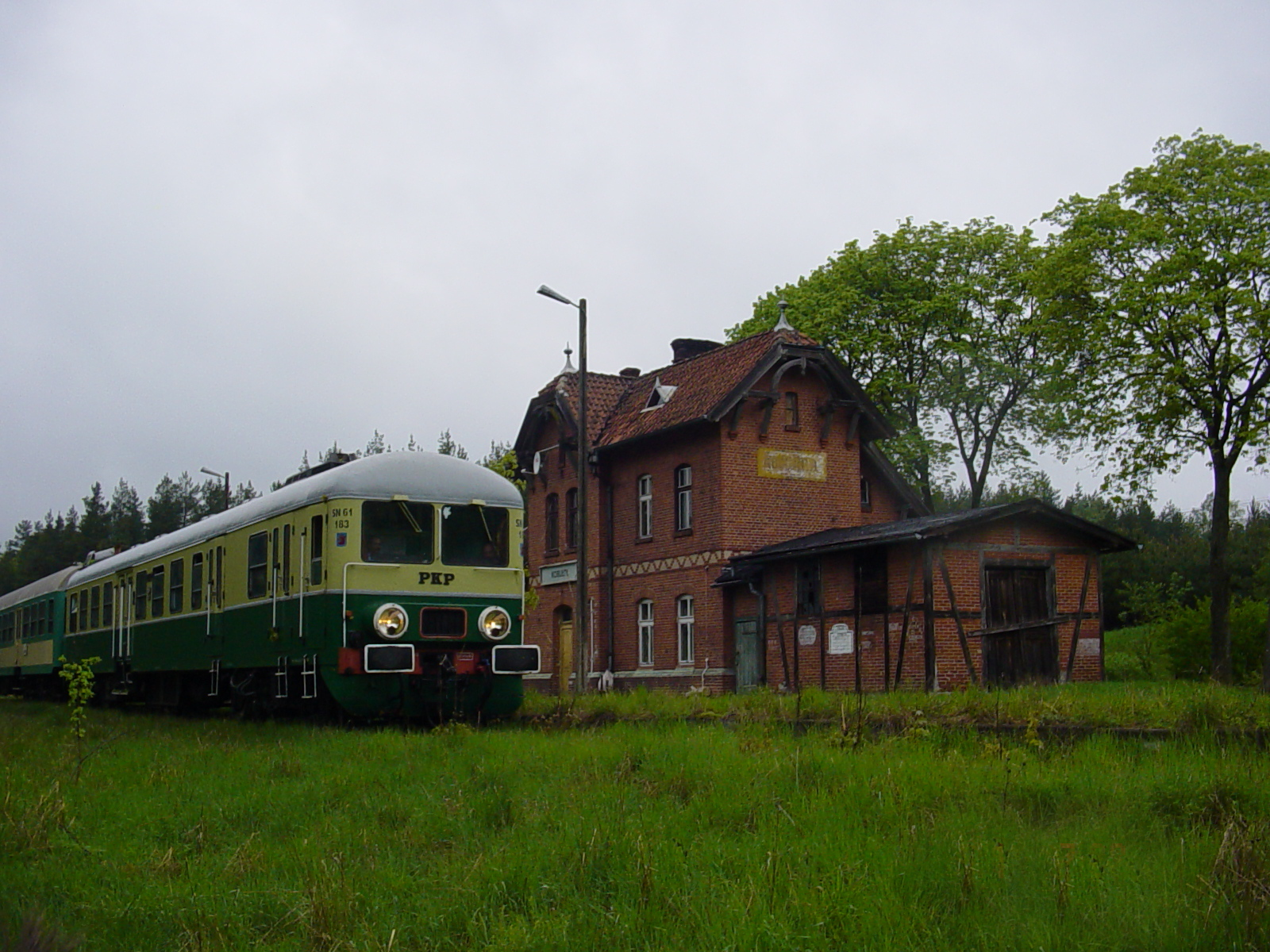
- Train stop in Kobułty (2003)

- Location within Poland
- Coordinates: 53°47′N 21°2′E
- Country: Poland
- Voivodeship: Warmian-Masurian
- County: Olsztyn
- Gmina: Biskupiec
- Population: 520

Kobułty [kɔˈbuu̯tɨ] is a village in the administrative district of Gmina Biskupiec, within Olsztyn County, Warmian-Masurian Voivodeship, in northern Poland.
