= Zabrodzie, Warmian-Masurian Voivodeship =

Zabrodzie
- Village
- Location within Poland
- Coordinates: 53°49′N 20°58′E
- Country: Poland
- Voivodeship: Warmian-Masurian
- County: Olsztyn
- Gmina: Biskupiec
- Population: 340

Zabrodzie [zaˈbrɔd͡ʑɛ] is a village in the administrative district of Gmina Biskupiec, within Olsztyn County, Warmian-Masurian Voivodeship, in northern Poland.
