= Rukławki =

- Village
- Location within Poland
- Coordinates: 53°52′N 20°55′E
- Country: Poland
- Voivodeship: Warmian-Masurian
- County: Olsztyn
- Gmina: Biskupiec

Rukławki [ruˈkwafki] is a village in the administrative district of Gmina Biskupiec, within Olsztyn County, Warmian-Masurian Voivodeship, in northern Poland.
