= Waste heat =

Heat produced as a byproduct of doing work

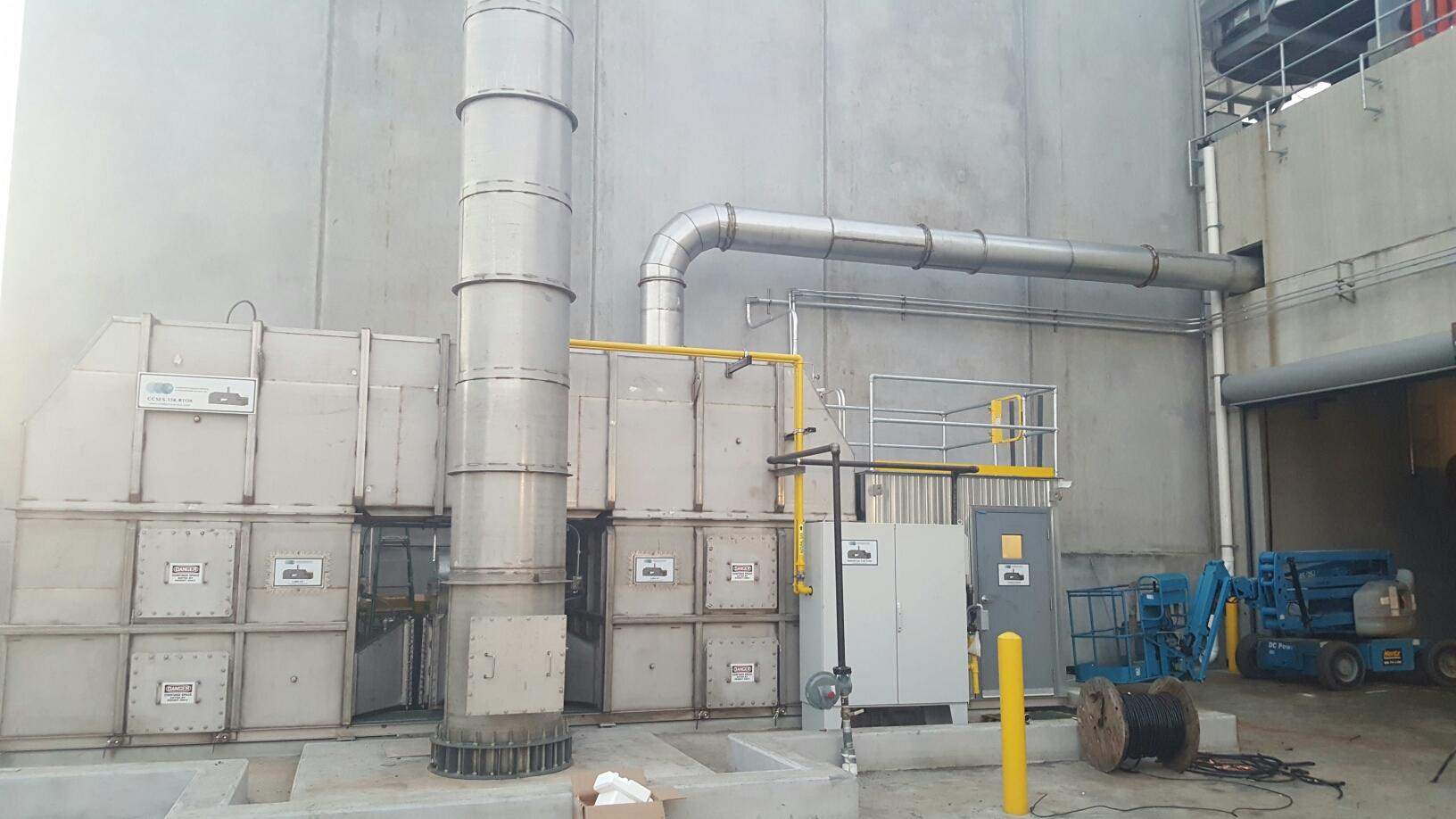
Thermal oxidizers can use a regenerative process for waste heat from industrial systems.

Waste heat is heat that is produced by a machine, or other process that uses energy, as a byproduct of doing work. All such processes give off some waste heat as a fundamental result of the laws of thermodynamics. Waste heat has lower utility (or in thermodynamics lexicon a lower exergy or higher entropy) than the original energy source. Sources of waste heat include all manner of human activities, natural systems, and all organisms, for example, incandescent light bulbs get hot, a building gets hot during peak hours, an internal combustion engine generates high-temperature exhaust gases, and electronic components get warm when in operation.

Instead of being "wasted" by release into the ambient environment, sometimes waste heat (or cold) can be used by another process (such as using hot engine coolant to heat a vehicle), or a portion of heat that would otherwise be wasted can be reused in the same process if make-up heat is added to the system (as with heat recovery ventilation in a building). For example, waste heat from industrial processes, power plants or from computing can be used to provide the heat needed in northern greenhouses to grow food.

Thermal energy storage, which includes technologies both for short- and long-term retention of heat or cold, can create or improve the utility of waste heat (or cold). One example is waste heat from air conditioning machinery stored in a buffer tank to aid in night time heating. Another is seasonal thermal energy storage (STES) at a foundry in Sweden. The heat is stored in the bedrock surrounding a cluster of heat exchanger equipped boreholes, and is used for space heating in an adjacent factory as needed, even months later. An example of using STES to use natural waste heat is the Drake Landing Solar Community in Alberta, Canada, which, by using a cluster of boreholes in bedrock for interseasonal heat storage, obtains 97 percent of its year-round heat from solar thermal collectors on the garage roofs. Another STES application is storing winter cold underground, for summer air conditioning.

On a biological scale, all organisms reject waste heat as part of their metabolic processes, and will die if the ambient temperature is too high to allow this.

Anthropogenic waste heat can contribute to the urban heat island effect. The biggest point sources of waste heat originate from machines (such as electrical generators or industrial processes, such as steel or glass production) and heat loss through building envelopes. The burning of transport fuels is also a significant contribution to waste heat.

== Conversion of energy ==
Machines converting energy contained in fuels to mechanical work or electric energy produce heat as a by-product.

== Sources ==
In the majority of applications, energy is required in multiple forms. These energy forms typically include some combination of heating, ventilation, and air conditioning, mechanical energy and electric power. Often, these additional forms of energy are produced by a heat engine running on a source of high-temperature heat. A heat engine can never have perfect efficiency, according to the second law of thermodynamics, therefore a heat engine will always produce a surplus of low-temperature heat. This is commonly referred to as waste heat or "secondary heat", or "low-grade heat". This heat is useful for the majority of heating applications, however, it is sometimes not practical to transport heat energy over long distances, unlike electricity or fuel energy. The largest proportions of total waste heat are from power stations and vehicle engines. The largest single sources are power stations and industrial plants such as oil refineries and steelmaking plants.

=== Power generation ===
The electrical efficiency of thermal power plants is defined as the ratio between the input and output energy. It is typically only 33% when disregarding usefulness of the heat output for building heat. The images show cooling towers, which allow power stations to maintain the low side of the temperature difference essential for conversion of heat differences to other forms of energy. Discarded or "waste" heat that is lost to the environment may instead be used to advantage.

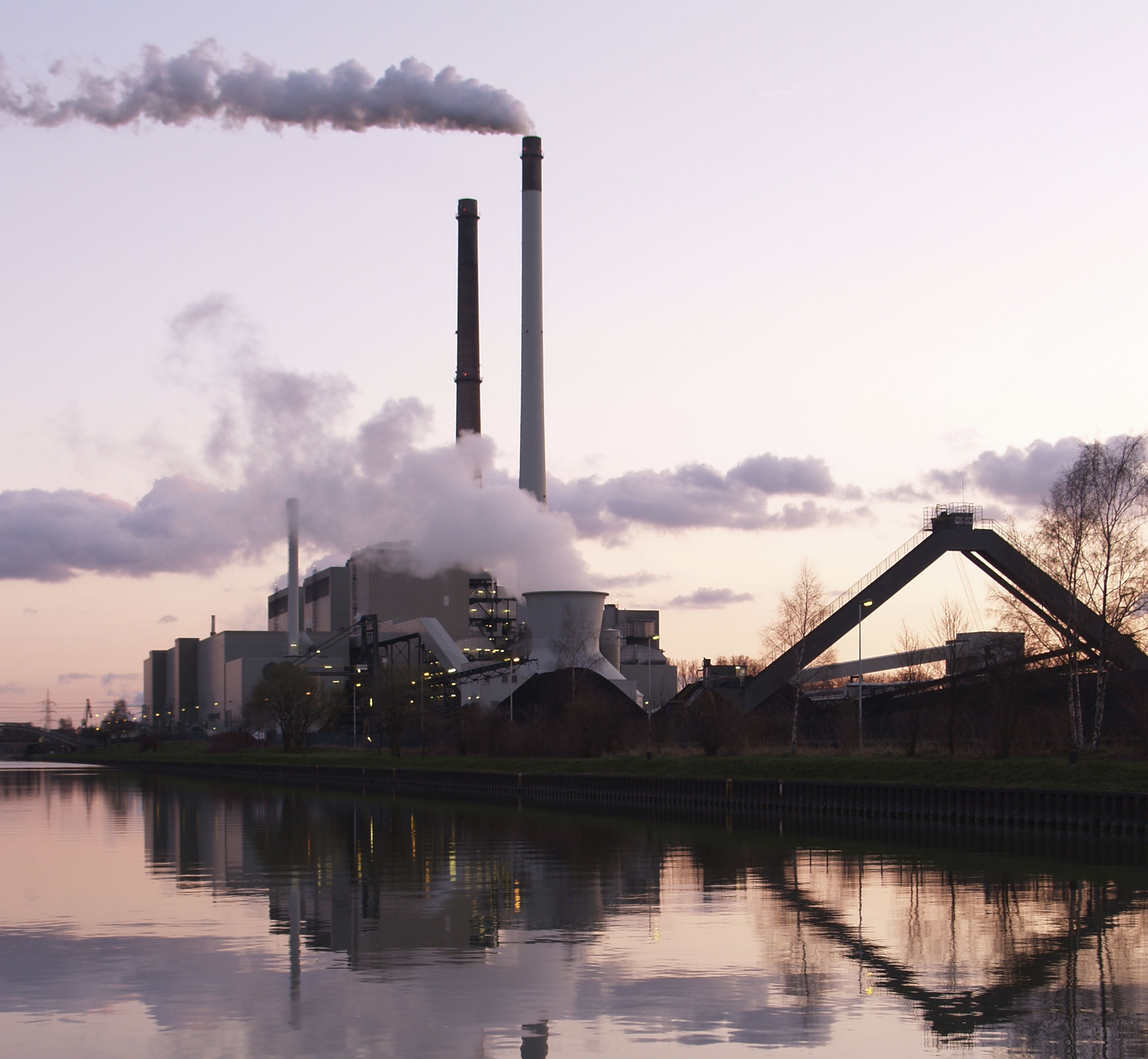
A coal-fired power station. These transform chemical energy into 36–48% electricity and the remaining 52–64% to waste heat.

=== Industrial processes ===
Industrial processes, such as oil refining, steel making or glass making are major sources of waste heat.

=== Steam generation ===
Waste heat is frequently recovered in the production of steam. In many industrial facilities and power generation systems, high temperature exhaust gases from gas turbines, internal combustion engines, industrial furnaces, and other thermal processes contain enough residual energy to generate steam through heat exchange. Devices such as waste heat boilers and heat recovery steam generators (HRSGs) transfer thermal energy from exhaust streams to water, producing steam without surplus fuel combustion.

In combined cycle power plants, exhaust heat from a gas turbine is directed to a heat recovery steam generator, where it then produces steam to drive a secondary steam turbine, increasing overall plant efficiency. Similar systems are used in marine propulsion, refineries, chemical plants, and steel mills, where exhaust gas boilers convert waste heat to process steam.

Recovered steam may be used for electricity generation, industrial processes, district heating, or other thermal applications. The recovery of waste heat for steam generation improves overall energy efficiency and reduces fuel consumption and associated emissions.

=== Electronics ===
Although small in terms of power, the disposal of waste heat from microchips and other electronic components, represents a significant engineering challenge. This necessitates the use of fans, heatsinks, etc. to dispose of the heat.

For example, data centers use electronic components that consume electricity for computing, storage and networking. The French CNRS explains a data center is like a resistor and most of the energy it consumes is transformed into heat and requires cooling systems.

=== Biological ===
Humans, like all animals, produce heat as a result of metabolism. In warm conditions, this heat exceeds a level required for homeostasis in warm-blooded animals, and is disposed of by various thermoregulation methods such as sweating and panting.

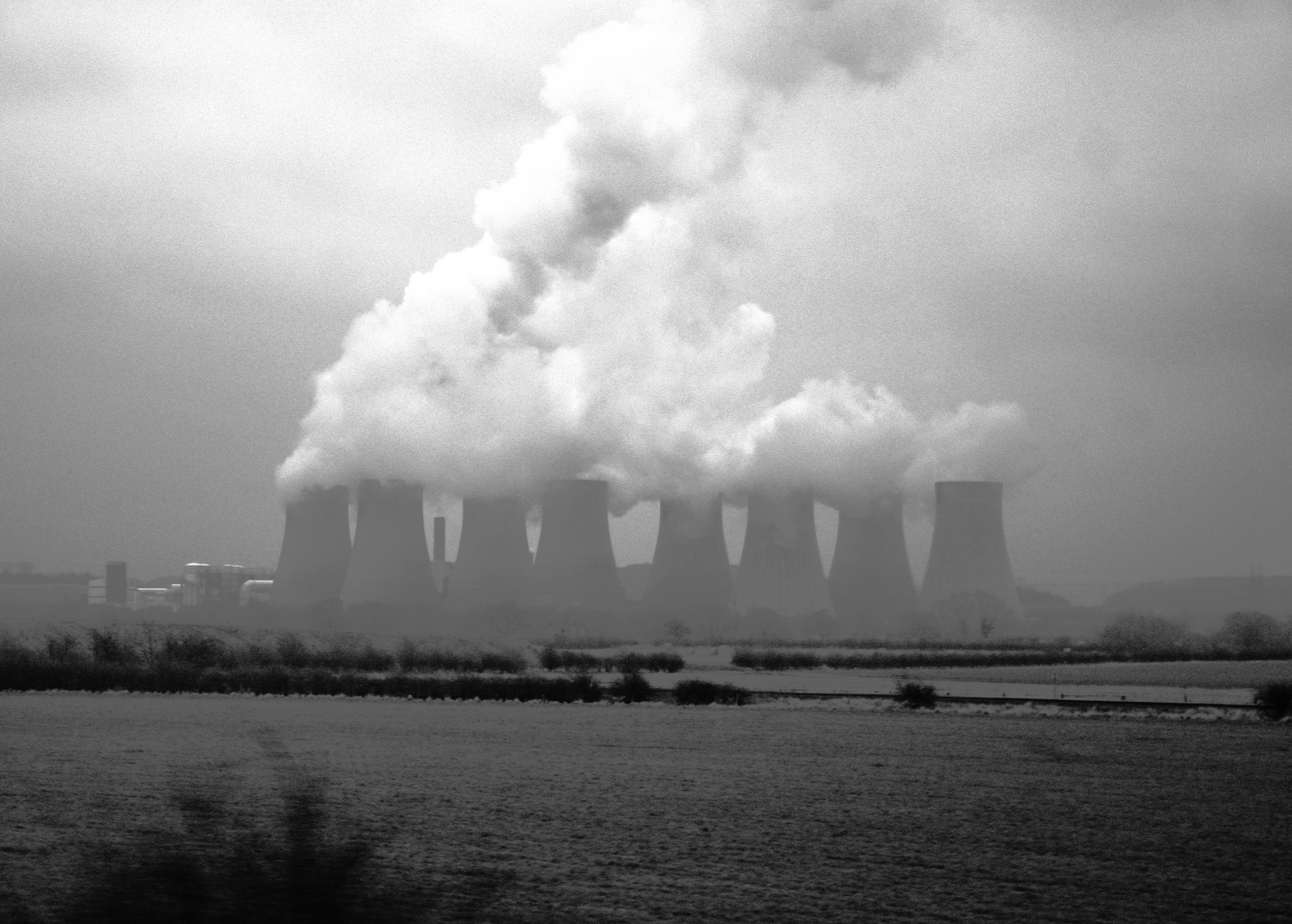
Cooling towers evaporating water at Ratcliffe-on-Soar Power Station, United Kingdom

== Disposal ==
Low temperature heat contains very little capacity to do work (Exergy), so the heat is qualified as waste heat and rejected to the environment. Economically most convenient is the rejection of such heat to water from a sea, lake or river. If sufficient cooling water is not available, the plant can be equipped with a cooling tower or air cooler to reject the waste heat into the atmosphere. In some cases it is possible to use waste heat, for instance in district heating systems.

== Uses ==
=== Conversion to electricity ===
There are many different approaches to transfer thermal energy to electricity, and the technologies to do so have existed for several decades.

An established approach is by using a thermoelectric device, where a change in temperature across a semiconductor material creates a voltage through a phenomenon known as the Seebeck effect.

A related approach is the use of thermogalvanic cells, where a temperature difference gives rise to an electric current in an electrochemical cell.

The organic Rankine cycle, offered by companies such as Ormat, is a very known approach, whereby an organic substance is used as working fluid instead of water. The benefit is that this process can reject heat at lower temperatures for the production of electricity than the regular water steam cycle. An example of use of the steam Rankine cycle is the Cyclone Waste Heat Engine.

=== Cogeneration and trigeneration ===
Waste of the by-product heat is reduced if a cogeneration system is used, also known as a Combined Heat and Power (CHP) system. Limitations to the use of by-product heat arise primarily from the engineering cost/efficiency challenges in effectively exploiting small temperature differences to generate other forms of energy. Applications utilizing waste heat include swimming pool heating and paper mills. In some cases, cooling can also be produced by the use of absorption refrigerators for example, in this case it is called trigeneration or CCHP (combined cooling, heat and power).

=== District heating ===
Waste heat can be used in district heating. Depending on the temperature of the waste heat and the district heating system, a heat pump must be used to reach sufficient temperatures. These are an easy and cheap way to use waste heat in cold district heating systems, as these are operated at ambient temperatures and therefore even low-grade waste heat can be used without needing a heat pump at the producer side. Denmark has been a leader in waste heat recovery, with cities reusing excess heat from a variety of sources including cement plants and even crematoria and redirecting it to the district heating network.

=== Pre-heating ===
Waste heat can be forced to heat incoming fluids and objects before being highly heated. For instance, outgoing water can give its waste heat to incoming water in a heat exchanger before heating in homes or power plants.

== Anthropogenic heat ==
Anthropogenic heat is heat generated by humans and human activity. The American Meteorological Society defines it as "Heat released to the atmosphere as a result of human activities, often involving combustion of fuels. Sources include industrial plants, space heating and cooling, human metabolism, and vehicle exhausts. In cities this source typically contributes 15–50 W/m^{2} to the local heat balance, and several hundred W/m^{2} in the center of large cities in cold climates and industrial areas." In 2020, the overall anthropogenic annual energy release was 168,000 terawatt-hours; given the 5.1×10^{14} m^{2} surface area of Earth, this amounts to a global average anthropogenic heat release rate of 0.04 W/m^{2}.

=== Environmental impact ===
Anthropogenic heat is a small influence on rural temperatures, and becomes more significant in dense urban areas. It is one contributor to urban heat islands. Other human-caused effects (such as changes to albedo, or loss of evaporative cooling) that might contribute to urban heat islands are not considered to be anthropogenic heat by this definition.

Anthropogenic heat is a much smaller contributor to global warming than greenhouse gases are. In 2005, anthropogenic waste heat flux globally accounted for only 1% of the energy flux created by anthropogenic greenhouse gases. The heat flux is not evenly distributed, with some regions higher than others, and significantly higher in certain urban areas. For example, global forcing from waste heat in 2005 was 0.028 W/m^{2}, but was +0.39 and +0.68 W/m^{2} for the continental United States and western Europe, respectively.

Although waste heat has been shown to have influence on regional climates, climate forcing from waste heat is not normally calculated in state-of-the-art global climate simulations. Equilibrium climate experiments show statistically significant continental-scale surface warming (0.4–0.9 °C) produced by one 2100 AHF scenario, but not by current or 2040 estimates. Simple global-scale estimates with different growth rates of anthropogenic heat that have been actualized recently show noticeable contributions to global warming, in the following centuries. For example, a 2% p.a. growth rate of waste heat resulted in a 3 degree increase as a lower limit for the year 2300. Meanwhile, this has been confirmed by more refined model calculations.

A 2008 scientific paper showed that if anthropogenic heat emissions continue to rise at the current rate, they will become a source of warming as strong as GHG emissions in the 21st century.

== See also ==
- Cost of electricity by source
- Heat recovery steam generator
- Pinch analysis
- Thermal pollution
- Urban metabolism
- Waste heat recovery unit
