= Pierwój =

- Settlement
- Location within Poland
- Coordinates: 53°48′38″N 21°06′15″E
- Country: Poland
- Voivodeship: Warmian-Masurian
- County: Olsztyn
- Gmina: Biskupiec
- Population: 23

Pierwój [ˈpjɛrvui̯] is a settlement in the administrative district of Gmina Biskupiec, within Olsztyn County, Warmian-Masurian Voivodeship, in northern Poland.
