= Sadłowo, Warmian-Masurian Voivodeship =

Sadłowo
- Village
- Location within Poland
- Coordinates: 53°53′06″N 20°59′02″E
- Country: Poland
- Voivodeship: Warmian-Masurian
- County: Olsztyn
- Gmina: Biskupiec
- Population: 46

Sadłowo [saˈdwɔvɔ] is a village in the administrative district of Gmina Biskupiec, within Olsztyn County, Warmian-Masurian Voivodeship, in northern Poland.
