= Zarębiec =

- Village
- Location within Poland
- Coordinates: 53°56′N 20°56′E
- Country: Poland
- Voivodeship: Warmian-Masurian
- County: Olsztyn
- Gmina: Biskupiec

Zarębiec [zaˈrɛmbjɛt͡s] is a village in the administrative district of Gmina Biskupiec, within Olsztyn County, Warmian-Masurian Voivodeship, in northern Poland.
