= Borki Wielkie, Warmian-Masurian Voivodeship =

Borki Wielkie
- Village
- Location within Poland
- Coordinates: 53°50′1″N 21°3′43″E
- Country: Poland
- Voivodeship: Warmian-Masurian
- County: Olsztyn
- Gmina: Biskupiec
- Population: 350

Borki Wielkie ([ˈbɔrki ˈvjɛlkʲɛ]; German: Groß Borken) is a village in the administrative district of Gmina Biskupiec, within Olsztyn County, Warmian-Masurian Voivodeship, in northern Poland.
