= Nasy =

- Village
- Location within Poland
- Coordinates: 53°50′34″N 20°52′53″E
- Country: Poland
- Voivodeship: Warmian-Masurian
- County: Olsztyn
- Gmina: Biskupiec
- Population: 68

Nasy [ˈnasɨ] is a village in the administrative district of Gmina Biskupiec, within Olsztyn County, Warmian-Masurian Voivodeship, in northern Poland.
