= Biskupiec-Kolonia Pierwsza =

- Settlement
- Location within Poland
- Coordinates: 53°52′25″N 20°58′13″E
- Country: Poland
- Voivodeship: Warmian-Masurian
- County: Olsztyn
- Gmina: Biskupiec
- Population: 9

Biskupiec-Kolonia Pierwsza [bisˈkupjɛt͡s kɔˈlɔɲa ˈpjɛrfʂa] is a settlement in the administrative district of Gmina Biskupiec, within Olsztyn County, Warmian-Masurian Voivodeship, in northern Poland.
