= Zazdrość, Gmina Biskupiec =

Zazdrość
- Village
- Location within Poland
- Coordinates: 53°49′16″N 20°51′45″E
- Country: Poland
- Voivodeship: Warmian-Masurian
- County: Olsztyn
- Gmina: Biskupiec
- Population: 28

Zazdrość [ˈzazdrɔɕt͡ɕ] is a village in the administrative district of Gmina Biskupiec, within Olsztyn County, Warmian-Masurian Voivodeship, in northern Poland.
