= Botowo =

- Village
- Location within Poland
- Coordinates: 53°48′N 20°57′E
- Country: Poland
- Voivodeship: Warmian-Masurian
- County: Olsztyn
- Gmina: Biskupiec

Botowo ([bɔˈtɔvɔ]; German: Bottowen, 1938–1945 Bottau) is a village in the administrative district of Gmina Biskupiec, within Olsztyn County, Warmian-Masurian Voivodeship, in northern Poland.
