= Czerwonka, Olsztyn County =

Czerwonka
- Village
- Location within Poland
- Coordinates: 53°54′33″N 20°54′29″E
- Country: Poland
- Voivodeship: Warmian-Masurian
- County: Olsztyn
- Gmina: Biskupiec
- Population: 1,090

Czerwonka ([t͡ʂɛrˈvɔnka]; German: Rothfließ) is a village in the administrative district of Gmina Biskupiec, within Olsztyn County, Warmian-Masurian Voivodeship, in northern Poland.
