= Kamionka, Olsztyn County =

Kamionka
- Village
- Location within Poland
- Coordinates: 53°49′N 21°6′E
- Country: Poland
- Voivodeship: Warmian-Masurian
- County: Olsztyn
- Gmina: Biskupiec

Kamionka ([kaˈmjɔnka]; German: Steinhof) is a village in the administrative district of Gmina Biskupiec, within Olsztyn County, Warmian-Masurian Voivodeship, in northern Poland.
