= Zawada, Olsztyn County =

Zawada
- Settlement
- Location within Poland
- Coordinates: 53°54′12″N 21°03′11″E
- Country: Poland
- Voivodeship: Warmian-Masurian
- County: Olsztyn
- Gmina: Biskupiec
- Population: 6

Zawada [zaˈvada] is a settlement in the administrative district of Gmina Biskupiec, within Olsztyn County, Warmian-Masurian Voivodeship, in northern Poland.
