= Zameczek, Olsztyn County =

Zameczek
- Village
- Location within Poland
- Coordinates: 53°52′44″N 20°57′50″E
- Country: Poland
- Voivodeship: Warmian-Masurian
- County: Olsztyn
- Gmina: Biskupiec
- Population: 30

Zameczek [zaˈmɛt͡ʂɛk] is a village in the administrative district of Gmina Biskupiec, within Olsztyn County, Warmian-Masurian Voivodeship, in northern Poland.
