= Rozwady, Warmian-Masurian Voivodeship =

Rozwady
- Settlement
- Location within Poland
- Coordinates: 53°52′56″N 20°56′14″E
- Country: Poland
- Voivodeship: Warmian-Masurian
- County: Olsztyn
- Gmina: Biskupiec
- Population: 19

Rozwady [rɔzˈvadɨ] is a settlement in the administrative district of Gmina Biskupiec, within Olsztyn County, Warmian-Masurian Voivodeship, in northern Poland.
