= Rudziska =

- Village
- Location within Poland
- Coordinates: 53°50′N 20°59′E
- Country: Poland
- Voivodeship: Warmian-Masurian
- County: Olsztyn
- Gmina: Biskupiec

Rudziska [ruˈd͡ʑiska] is a village in the administrative district of Gmina Biskupiec, within Olsztyn County, Warmian-Masurian Voivodeship, in northern Poland.
