= Bredynki =

- Village
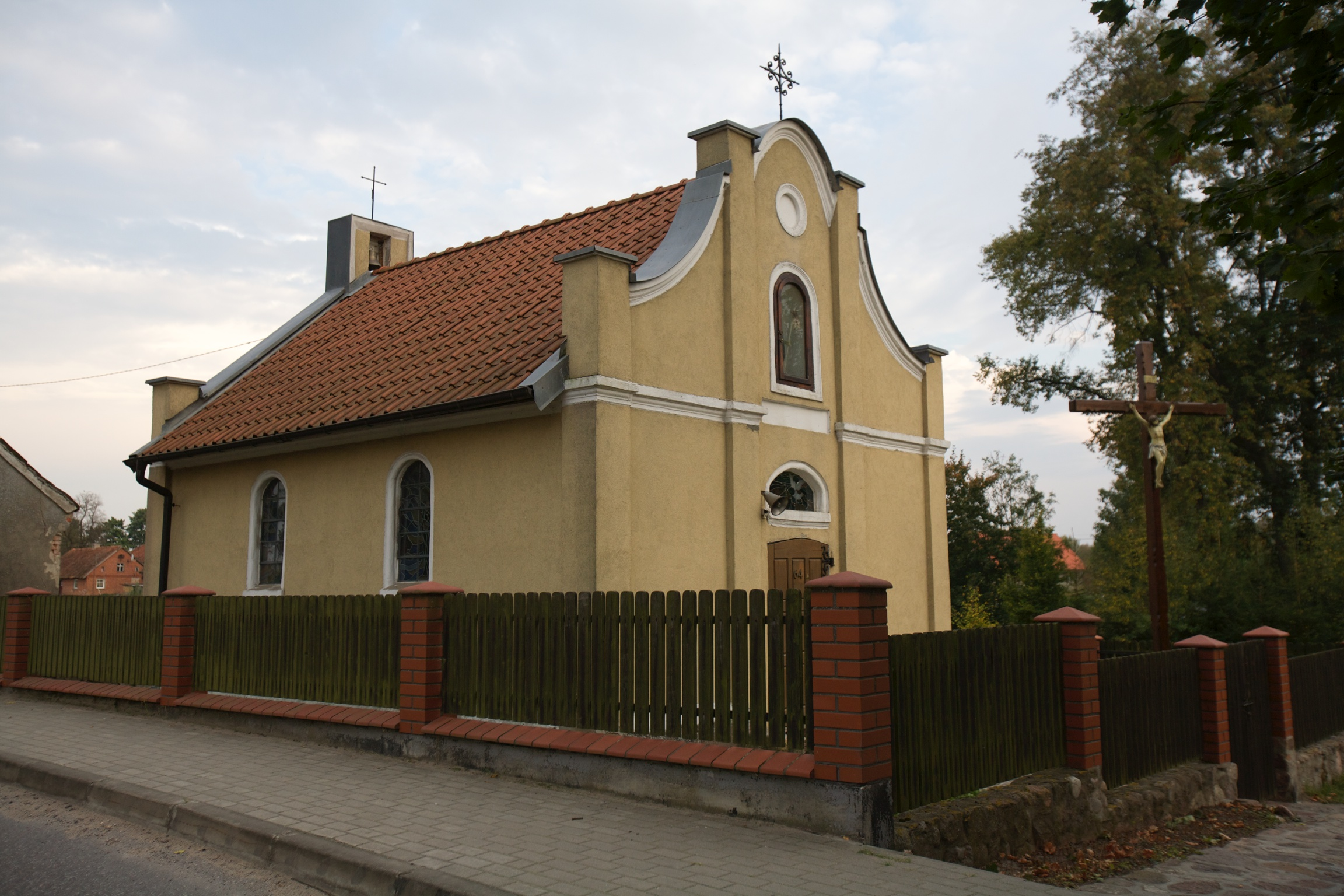
- Saint Roch chapel in Bredynki

- Location within Poland
- Coordinates: 53°54′N 21°3′E
- Country: Poland
- Voivodeship: Warmian-Masurian
- County: Olsztyn
- Gmina: Biskupiec
- Founded: 1599
- Vehicle registration: NOL

Bredynki ([brɛˈdɨnki]; German: Bredinken) is a village in the administrative district of Gmina Biskupiec, within Olsztyn County, Warmian-Masurian Voivodeship, in northern Poland. It is situated in the historic region of Warmia.

== History ==
The village was founded in 1599 within the Kingdom of Poland. In 1772 it was annexed by the Kingdom of Prussia in the First Partition of Poland. On 6 May 1863, the village was the site of a massacre of Polish inhabitants. Local farmers protested the taking of the lake from the village and handing it over to a local miller. Prussian troops fired on the crowd, killing more than a dozen people, including women, and wounding 30. In 1884, the Saint Roch chapel was built by the local people to commemorate the victims.
