= Dębowo, Warmian-Masurian Voivodeship =

Dębowo
- Settlement
- Location within Poland
- Coordinates: 53°55′27″N 20°59′17″E
- Country: Poland
- Voivodeship: Warmian-Masurian
- County: Olsztyn
- Gmina: Biskupiec
- Population: 27

Dębowo ([dɛmˈbɔvɔ]; German: Dembowo, 1938–45 Diborn) is a settlement in the administrative district of Gmina Biskupiec, within Olsztyn County, Warmian-Masurian Voivodeship, in northern Poland.
