= Bukowa Góra, Warmian-Masurian Voivodeship =

Bukowa Góra
- Village
- Location within Poland
- Coordinates: 53°54′N 20°57′E
- Country: Poland
- Voivodeship: Warmian-Masurian
- County: Olsztyn
- Gmina: Biskupiec
- Population: 0

Bukowa Góra ([buˈkɔva ˈɡura]; German: Buchenberg) is a former village in the administrative district of Gmina Biskupiec, within Olsztyn County, Warmian-Masurian Voivodeship, in northern Poland.
