= Pudląg =

- Village
- Location within Poland
- Coordinates: 53°49′54″N 20°57′33″E
- Country: Poland
- Voivodeship: Warmian-Masurian
- County: Olsztyn
- Gmina: Biskupiec

Pudląg [ˈpudlɔnk] is a village in the administrative district of Gmina Biskupiec, within Olsztyn County, Warmian-Masurian Voivodeship, in northern Poland.
