= Januszewo, Olsztyn County =

Januszewo
- Settlement
- Location within Poland
- Coordinates: 53°52′39″N 20°59′09″E
- Country: Poland
- Voivodeship: Warmian-Masurian
- County: Olsztyn
- Gmina: Biskupiec
- Population: 13

Januszewo ([januˈʂɛvɔ]; German: Johannisberg) is a settlement in the administrative district of Gmina Biskupiec, within Olsztyn County, Warmian-Masurian Voivodeship, in northern Poland.
