= Gęsikowo =

- Settlement
- Location within Poland
- Coordinates: 53°53′20″N 20°57′21″E
- Country: Poland
- Voivodeship: Warmian-Masurian
- County: Olsztyn
- Gmina: Biskupiec
- Population: 16

Gęsikowo ([ɡɛ̃ɕiˈkɔvɔ]; German: Labuch (Forst)) is a settlement in the administrative district of Gmina Biskupiec, within Olsztyn County, Warmian-Masurian Voivodeship, in northern Poland.
