= Mojtyny, Olsztyn County =

Mojtyny
- Village
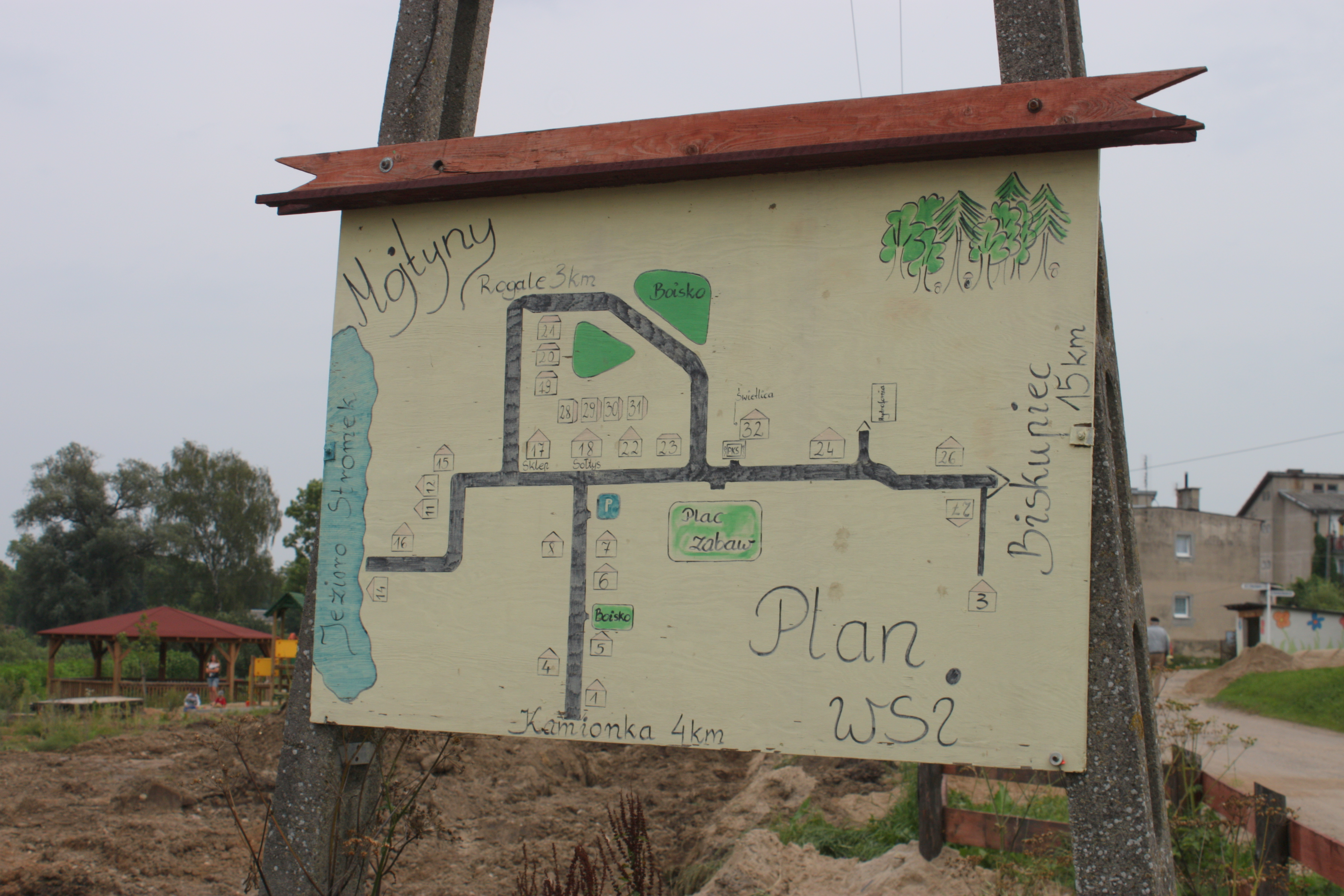

- Location within Poland
- Coordinates: 53°46′49″N 21°05′22″E
- Country: Poland
- Voivodeship: Warmian-Masurian
- County: Olsztyn
- Gmina: Biskupiec

Mojtyny [mɔi̯ˈtɨnɨ] is a village in the administrative district of Gmina Biskupiec, within Olsztyn County, Warmian-Masurian Voivodeship, in northern Poland.
