= Lipowo, Olsztyn County =

Lipowo
- Village
- Location within Poland
- Coordinates: 53°51′41″N 21°0′30″E
- Country: Poland
- Voivodeship: Warmian-Masurian
- County: Olsztyn
- Gmina: Biskupiec
- Population: 285

Lipowo ([liˈpɔvɔ]; German: Lindenhorst; Lithuanian: Liepuva) is a village in the administrative district of Gmina Biskupiec, within Olsztyn County, Warmian-Masurian Voivodeship, in northern Poland.
