= Dimer =

Dimer may refer to:

- Dimer (chemistry), a chemical structure formed from two similar sub-units
  - Protein dimer, a protein quaternary structure
  - d-dimer
  - TH-dimer
- Dimer model, an item in statistical mechanics, based on domino tiling
- Julius Dimer (1871–1945), German chess master

== See also ==
- Dimers, a sports betting analytics platform
- Dimery (botany), having two parts in a distinct whorl of a plant structure
- Di (disambiguation), a prefix
- Dymer (disambiguation)
- -mer, a suffix
- Oligomer
- Peierls transition, sometimes called dimerization
