= Dworzec, Warmian-Masurian Voivodeship =

Dworzec
- Village
- Location within Poland
- Coordinates: 53°48′51″N 20°57′15″E
- Country: Poland
- Voivodeship: Warmian-Masurian
- County: Olsztyn
- Gmina: Biskupiec
- Population: 128

Dworzec ([ˈdvɔʐɛt͡s]; German: Schönbruch) is a village in the administrative district of Gmina Biskupiec, within Olsztyn County, Warmian-Masurian Voivodeship, in northern Poland.
