= Dymer, Poland =

Dymer
- Village
- Location within Poland
- Coordinates: 53°47′4″N 20°58′34″E
- Country: Poland
- Voivodeship: Warmian-Masurian
- County: Olsztyn
- Gmina: Biskupiec
- Population: 97

Dymer ([ˈdɨmɛr]; German: Dimmern) is a village in the administrative district of Gmina Biskupiec, within Olsztyn County, Warmian-Masurian Voivodeship, in northern Poland.
