= Dimers =

Sports betting analytics platform

- Type: Private
- Industry: Sports betting technology
- Founded: August 2020; 6 years ago
- Founder: Adam Fiske, Nick Slade, Katie Prowd, Darryl Woodford
- Headquarters: Melbourne, Australia; New York, United States
- Key people: Adam Fiske (CEO); Nick Slade (Chief Content Officer); Katie Prowd (COO); Darryl Woodford (CTO)
- Products: Dimers Pro, Dimers Platinum, Bettorverse, predictive analytics tools, odds comparison
- Services: Sports predictions and betting content; data and content services for sportsbooks and media companies
- Parent: Cipher Sports Technology Group
- Website: dimers.com

Dimers is a sports betting analytics platform that provides predictive tools, data-driven insights, news, and betting content for sports fans and bettors. It operates under the umbrella of Cipher Sports Technology Group and has offices in New York and Melbourne.

== History ==
Dimers.com was launched in the United States on 1 August 2020 as a joint project of two Australian companies, iRival Media and Hypometer Technologies, which later merged to form its parent company named Cipher Sports Technology Group. iRival Media, founded in October 2019 by Adam Fiske and Nick Slade, focused on delivering content to the sports betting market. Hypometer Technologies, established in 2015 by Katie Prowd and Darryl Woodford, specialized in predictive analytics and machine learning for sports.

In July 2022, Cipher raised US$5 million in a funding round led by the Melbourne investment firm Cygnet Capital. In 2023, Dimers launched Bettorverse platform which runs betting models built with artificial intelligence, and in 2024, it introduced a paid subscription service Dimers Pro.

Dimers’ data has been cited by publications such as Sports Illustrated, USA Today, and The Arizona Republic.

== Partnerships and Collaborations ==
In 2020, Dimers partnered with SportCaller to offer free-to-play games. The joint venture’s initial launch focused on the NBA Finals.

In 2023, Dimers collaborated with MLS to provide sports betting content on MLSsoccer.com, including predictive analytics and editorial pieces to assist fans in making informed betting decisions.

== Recognition ==
In 2025, Dimers Platinum was nominated in the Best Tech category of the iGB Affiliate Awards.
