= Ocean thermal energy conversion =

Extracting energy from the ocean

Ocean thermal energy conversion (OTEC) is a renewable energy technology that harnesses the temperature difference between the warm surface waters of the ocean and the cold depths to run a heat engine to produce electricity. It is a unique form of clean energy generation that has the potential to provide a consistent and sustainable source of power. Although it has challenges to overcome, OTEC has the potential to provide a consistent and sustainable source of clean energy, particularly in tropical regions with access to deep ocean water.

== Description ==
OTEC uses the ocean thermal gradient between cooler deep and warmer shallow or surface seawaters to run a heat engine and produce useful work, usually in the form of electricity. OTEC can operate with a very high capacity factor and so can operate in base load mode.

The denser cold water masses, formed by ocean surface water interaction with cold atmosphere in quite specific areas of the North Atlantic and the Southern Ocean, sink into the deep sea basins and spread in entire deep ocean by the thermohaline circulation. Upwelling of cold water from the deep ocean is replenished by the downwelling of cold surface sea water.

Among ocean energy sources, OTEC is one of the continuously available renewable energy resources that could contribute to base-load power supply. The resource potential for OTEC is considered to be much larger than for other ocean energy forms. Up to 10,000 TWh/yr of power could be generated from OTEC without affecting the ocean's thermal structure.

Systems may be either closed-cycle or open-cycle. Closed-cycle OTEC uses working fluids that are typically thought of as refrigerants such as ammonia or R-134a. These fluids have low boiling points, and are therefore suitable for powering the system's generator to generate electricity. The most commonly used heat cycle for OTEC to date is the Rankine cycle, using a low-pressure turbine. Open-cycle engines use vapor from the seawater itself as the working fluid.

OTEC can also supply quantities of cold water as a by-product. This can be used for air conditioning and refrigeration and the nutrient-rich deep ocean water can feed biological technologies. Another by-product is fresh water distilled from the sea.

OTEC theory was first developed in the 1880s and the first bench size demonstration model was constructed in 1926. Currently operating pilot-scale OTEC plants are located in Japan, overseen by Saga University, and in Hawaii operated by Makai Ocean Engineering.

== History ==
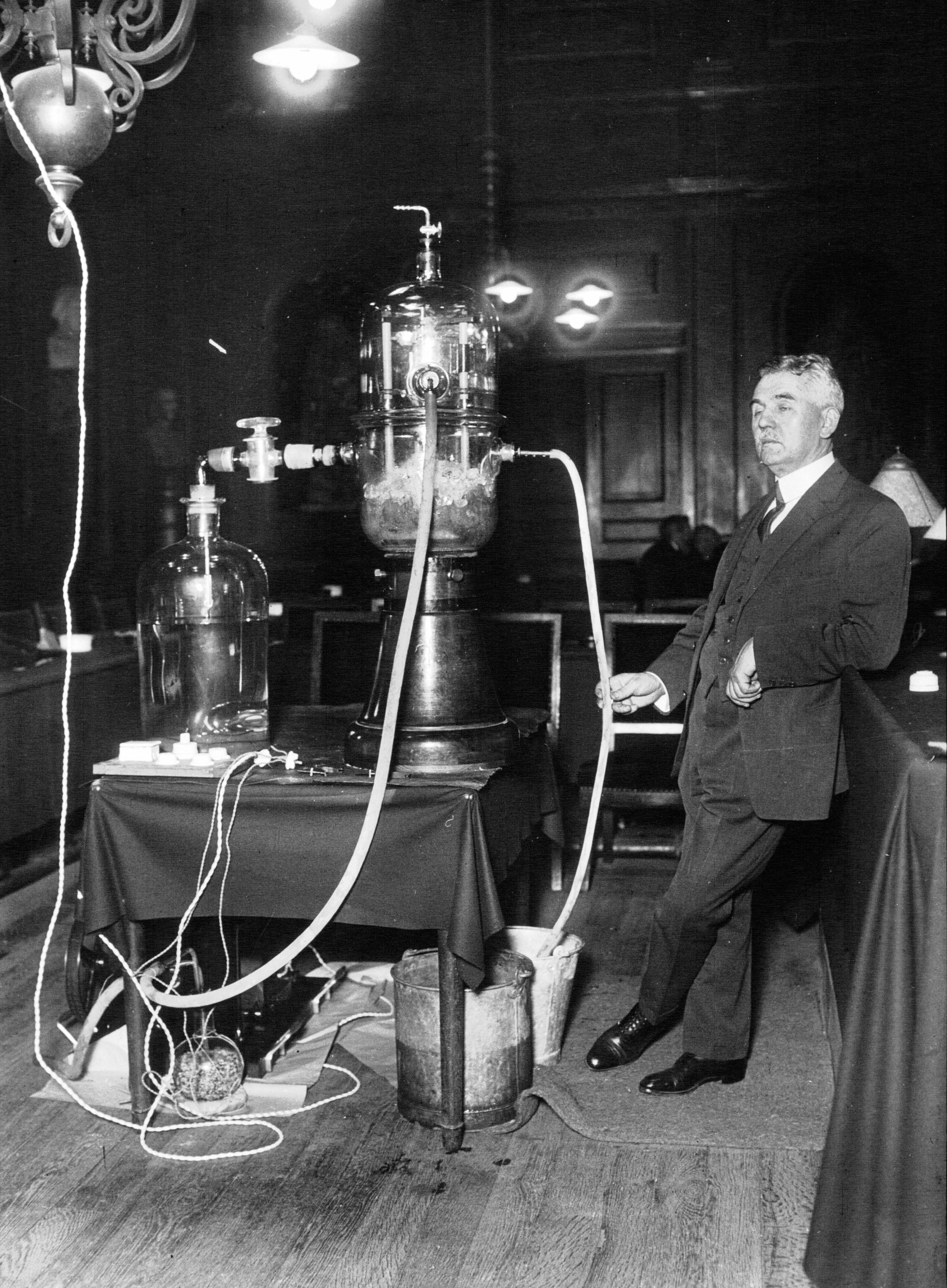
French engineer Georges Claude conducting a demonstration on ocean thermal energy conversion at the Institut de France in 1926

Attempts to develop and refine OTEC technology started in the 1880s. In 1881, Jacques Arsene d'Arsonval, a French physicist, proposed tapping the thermal energy of the ocean. D'Arsonval's student, Georges Claude, built the first OTEC plant, in Matanzas, Cuba in 1930. The system generated 22 kW of electricity with a low-pressure turbine. The plant was later destroyed in a storm.

In 1935, Claude constructed a plant aboard a 10,000-ton cargo vessel moored off the coast of Brazil. Weather and waves destroyed it before it could generate net power. (Net power is the amount of power generated after subtracting power needed to run the system.)

In 1956, French scientists designed a 3 MW plant for Abidjan, Ivory Coast. The plant was never completed, because new finds of large amounts of cheap petroleum made it uneconomical.

In 1962, J. Hilbert Anderson and James H. Anderson, Jr. focused on increasing component efficiency. They patented their new "closed cycle" design in 1967. This design improved upon the original closed-cycle Rankine system, and included this in an outline for a plant that would produce power at lower cost than oil or coal. At the time, however, their research garnered little attention since coal and nuclear were considered the future of energy.

Japan is a major contributor to the development of OTEC technology. Beginning in 1970 the Tokyo Electric Power Company successfully built and deployed a 100 kW closed-cycle OTEC plant on the island of Nauru. The plant became operational on 14 October 1981, producing about 120 kW of electricity; 90 kW was used to power the plant and the remaining electricity was used to power a school and other places. This set a world record for power output from an OTEC system where the power was sent to a real (as opposed to an experimental) power grid.

1981 also saw a major development in OTEC technology when Russian engineer, Dr. Alexander Kalina, used a mixture of ammonia and water to produce electricity. This new ammonia-water mixture greatly improved the efficiency of the power cycle. In 1994, the Institute of Ocean Energy at Saga University designed and constructed a 4.5 kW plant for the purpose of testing a newly invented Uehara cycle, also named after its inventor Haruo Uehara. This cycle included absorption and extraction processes that allow this system to outperform the Kalina cycle by 1–2%.

The 1970s saw an uptick in OTEC research and development during the post 1973 Arab-Israeli War, which caused oil prices to triple. The U.S. federal government poured $260 million into OTEC research after President Carter signed a law that committed the US to a production goal of 10,000 MW of electricity from OTEC systems by 1999.

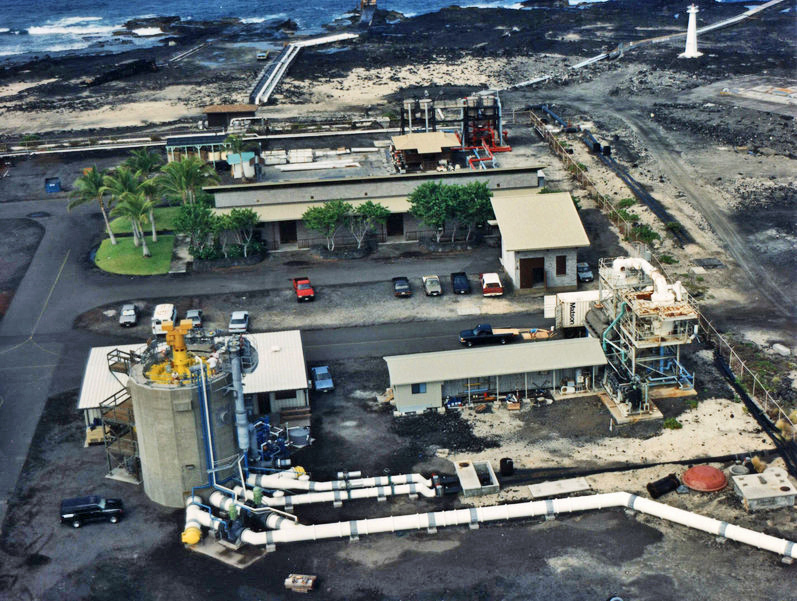
View of a land based OTEC facility at Keahole Point on the Kona coast of Hawaii

In 1974, The U.S. established the Natural Energy Laboratory of Hawaii Authority (NELHA) at Keahole Point on the Kona coast of Hawaii. Hawaii is the best US OTEC location, due to its warm surface water, access to very deep, very cold water, and high electricity costs. The laboratory has become a leading test facility for OTEC technology. In the same year, Lockheed received a grant from the U.S. National Science Foundation to study OTEC. This eventually led to an effort by Lockheed, the US Navy, Makai Ocean Engineering, Dillingham Construction, and other firms to build the world's first and only net-power producing OTEC plant, dubbed "Mini-OTEC". For three months in 1979, a small amount of electricity was generated. NELHA operated a 250 kW demonstration plant for six years in the 1990s. With funding from the United States Navy, a 105 kW plant at the site began supplying energy to the local power grid in 2015.

A European initiative EUROCEAN – a privately funded joint venture of 9 European companies already active in offshore engineering – was active in promoting OTEC from 1979 to 1983. Initially a large scale offshore facility was studied. Later a 100 kW land based installation was studied combining land based OTEC with Desalination and Aquaculture nicknamed ODA. This was based on the results from a small scale aquaculture facility at the island of St Croix that used a deepwater supply line to feed the aquaculture basins. Also a shore based open cycle plant was investigated. The location of the case of study was Curaçao, then part of the Netherlands Antilles.

Research related to making open-cycle OTEC a reality began earnestly in 1979 at the Solar Energy Research Institute (SERI) with funding from the US Department of Energy. Evaporators and suitably configured direct-contact condensers were developed and patented by SERI. An original design for a power-producing experiment, then called the 165 kW experiment, was described by Kreith and Bharathan as the Max Jakob Memorial Award Lecture. The initial design used two parallel axial turbines, using last stage rotors taken from large steam turbines. Later, a team led by Dr. Bharathan at the National Renewable Energy Laboratory (NREL) developed the initial conceptual design for up-dated 210 kW open-cycle OTEC experiment. This design integrated all components of the cycle, namely, the evaporator, condenser and the turbine into one single vacuum vessel, with the turbine mounted on top to prevent any potential for water to reach it. The vessel was made of concrete as the first process vacuum vessel of its kind. Attempts to make all components using low-cost plastic material could not be fully achieved, as some conservatism was required for the turbine and the vacuum pumps developed as the first of their kind. Later Dr. Bharathan worked with a team of engineers at the Pacific Institute for High Technology Research (PICHTR) to further pursue this design through preliminary and final stages. It was renamed the Net Power Producing Experiment (NPPE) and was constructed at the Natural Energy Laboratory of Hawaii (NELH) by PICHTR by a team led by Chief Engineer Don Evans and the project was managed by Dr. Luis Vega.

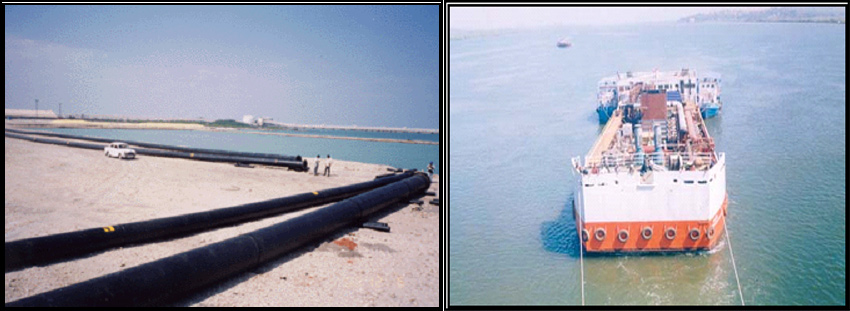
India – pipes used for OTEC (left) and floating OTEC plant constructed in 2000 (right)

In 2002, India tested a 1 MW floating OTEC pilot plant near Tamil Nadu. The plant was ultimately unsuccessful due to a failure of the deep sea cold water pipe. Its government continues to sponsor research.

In 2006, Makai Ocean Engineering was awarded a contract from the U.S. Office of Naval Research (ONR) to investigate the potential for OTEC to produce nationally significant quantities of hydrogen in at-sea floating plants located in warm, tropical waters. Realizing the need for larger partners to actually commercialize OTEC, Makai approached Lockheed Martin to renew their previous relationship and determine if the time was ready for OTEC. And so in 2007, Lockheed Martin resumed work in OTEC and became a subcontractor to Makai to support their SBIR, which was followed by other subsequent collaborations.

In March 2011, Ocean Thermal Energy Corporation signed an Energy Services Agreement (ESA) with the Baha Mar resort in Nassau, Bahamas, for the world's first and largest seawater air conditioning (SWAC) system. In June 2015, the project was put on pause while the resort resolved financial and ownership issues. In August 2016, it was announced that the issues had been resolved and that the resort would open in March 2017. It is expected that the SWAC system's construction will resume at that time.

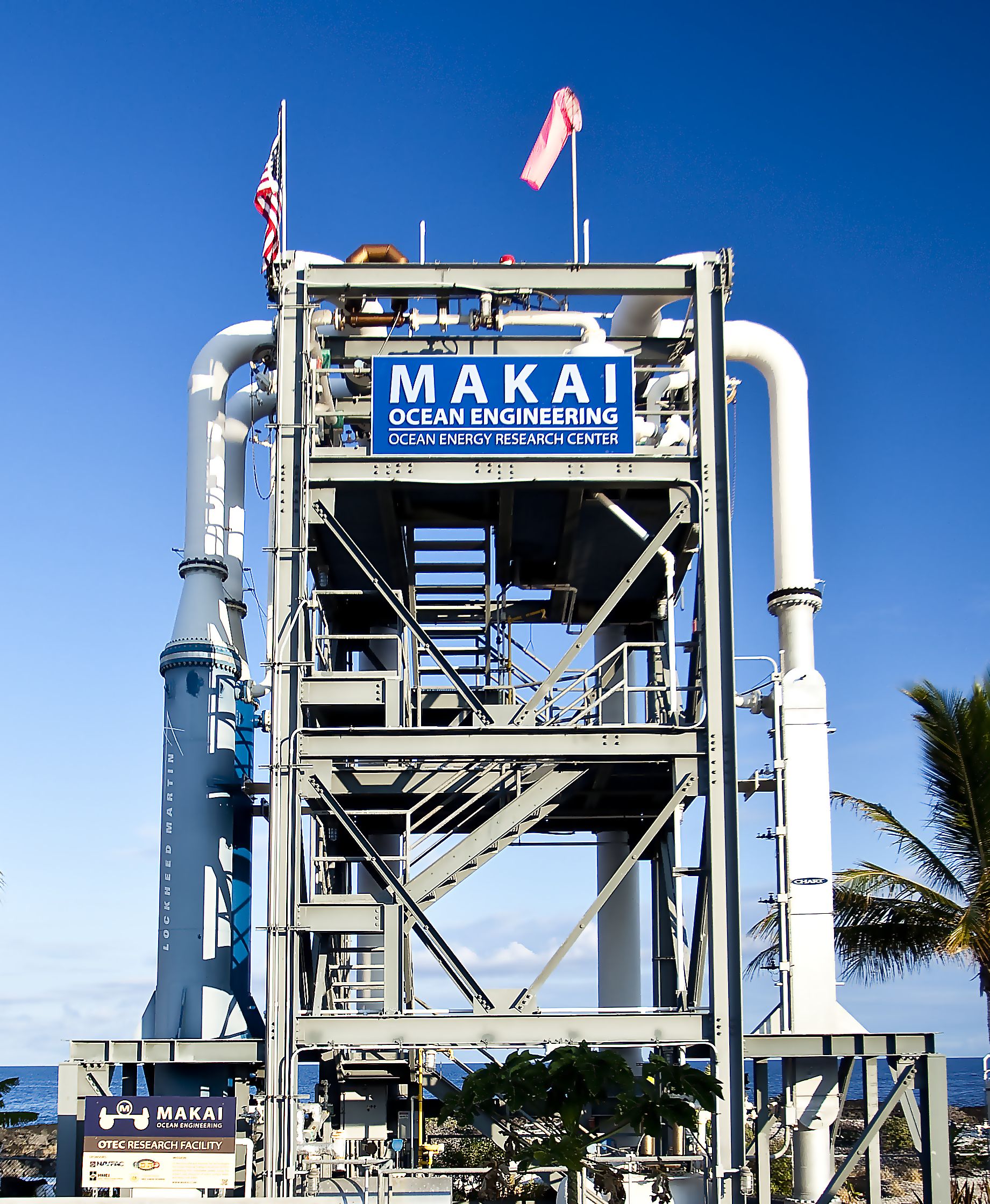
Makai Ocean Engineering's 105kW OTEC plant in Kona, Hawaii

In July 2011, Makai Ocean Engineering completed the design and construction of an OTEC Heat Exchanger Test Facility at the Natural Energy Laboratory of Hawaii. The purpose of the facility is to arrive at an optimal design for OTEC heat exchangers, increasing performance and useful life while reducing cost (heat exchangers being the primary cost driver for an OTEC plant). In March 2013, Makai announced an award to install and operate a 105 kilowatt turbine on the OTEC Heat Exchanger Test Facility. This marked the first time that OTEC power was connected to the U.S. grid.

In July 2016, the Virgin Islands Public Services Commission approved Ocean Thermal Energy Corporation's application to become a Qualified Facility. The company is thus permitted to begin negotiations with the Virgin Islands Water and Power Authority (WAPA) for a Power Purchase Agreement (PPA) pertaining to an Ocean Thermal Energy Conversion (OTEC) plant on the island of St. Croix. This would be the world's first commercial OTEC plant.

A project is set to be installed in the African country of São Tomé and Príncipe, which will be the first commercial-scale floating OTEC platform in the world. Developed by Global OTEC, the structure named Dominique will generate 1.5 MW, with subsequent barges being installed to help supply the full demand of the country. In 2022, a memorandum of understanding was signed between the government and British startup Global OTEC.

== Currently operating OTEC plants ==
In March 2013, Saga University with various Japanese industries completed the installation of a new OTEC plant. Okinawa Prefecture announced the start of the OTEC operation testing at Kume Island on April 15, 2013. The main aim is to prove the validity of computer models and demonstrate OTEC to the public. The testing and research will be conducted with the support of Saga University until the end of FY 2016. IHI Plant Construction Co. Ltd, Yokogawa Electric Corporation, and Xenesys Inc were entrusted with constructing the 100 kilowatt class plant within the grounds of the Okinawa Prefecture Deep Sea Water Research Center. The location was specifically chosen in order to utilize existing deep seawater and surface seawater intake pipes installed for the research center in 2000. The pipe is used for the intake of deep sea water for research, fishery, and agricultural use. The plant consists of two 50 kW units in double Rankine configuration. The OTEC facility and deep seawater research center are open to free public tours by appointment in English and Japanese. Currently, this is one of only two fully operational OTEC plants in the world. This plant operates continuously when specific tests are not underway.

In 2011, Makai Ocean Engineering completed a heat exchanger test facility at NELHA. Used to test a variety of heat exchange technologies for use in OTEC, Makai has received funding to install a 105 kW turbine. Installation will make this facility the largest operational OTEC facility, though the record for largest power will remain with the Open Cycle plant also developed in Hawaii.

In July 2014, DCNS group partnered with Akuo Energy announced NER 300 funding for their NEMO project. If the project was successful, the 16 MW gross 10 MW net offshore plant would have been the largest OTEC facility to date. DCNS planned to have NEMO operational by 2020. Early in April 2018, Naval Energies shut down the project indefinitely due to technical difficulties relating to the main cold-water intake pipe.

An ocean thermal energy conversion power plant built by Makai Ocean Engineering went operational in Hawaii in August 2015. The governor of Hawaii, David Ige, "flipped the switch" to activate the plant. This is the first true closed-cycle ocean Thermal Energy Conversion (OTEC) plant to be connected to a U.S. electrical grid. It is a demo plant capable of generating 105 kilowatts, enough to power about 120 homes.

== Thermodynamic efficiency ==
A heat engine gives greater efficiency when run with a large temperature difference. In the oceans the temperature difference between surface and deep water is greatest in the tropics, although still a modest 20 to 25 °C. It is therefore in the tropics that OTEC offers the greatest possibilities. OTEC has the potential to offer global amounts of energy that are 10 to 100 times greater than other ocean energy options such as wave power.

OTEC plants can operate continuously providing a base load supply for an electrical power generation system.

The main technical challenge of OTEC is to generate significant amounts of power efficiently from small temperature differences. It is still considered an emerging technology. Early OTEC systems were 1 to 3 percent thermally efficient, well below the theoretical maximum 6 and 7 percent for this temperature difference. Modern designs allow performance approaching the theoretical maximum Carnot efficiency.

== Power cycle types ==
Cold seawater is an integral part of each of the three types of OTEC systems: closed-cycle, open-cycle, and hybrid. To operate, the cold seawater must be brought to the surface. The primary approaches are active pumping and desalination. Desalinating seawater near the sea floor lowers its density, which causes it to rise to the surface.

The alternative to costly pipes to bring condensing cold water to the surface is to pump vaporized low boiling point fluid into the depths to be condensed, thus reducing pumping volumes and reducing technical and environmental problems and lowering costs.

=== Closed ===
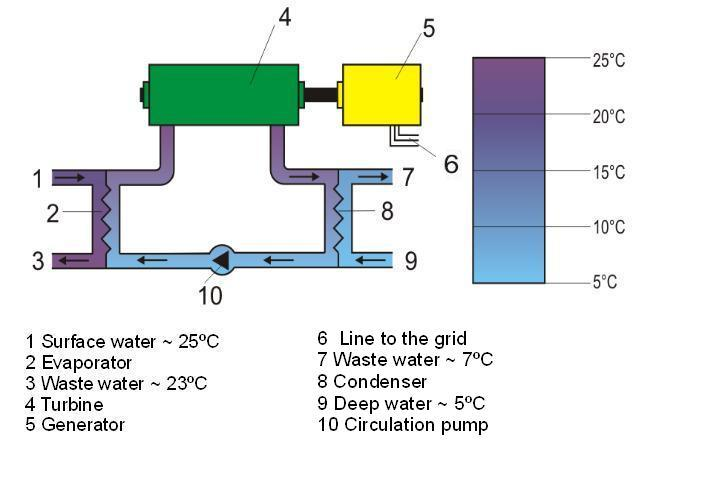
Diagram of a closed cycle OTEC plant

Closed-cycle systems use fluid with a low boiling point, such as ammonia (having a boiling point around −33 °C at atmospheric pressure), to power a turbine to generate electricity. Warm surface seawater is pumped through a heat exchanger to vaporize the fluid. The expanding vapor turns the turbo-generator. Cold water, pumped through a second heat exchanger, condenses the vapor into a liquid, which is then recycled through the system.

In 1979, the Natural Energy Laboratory and several private-sector partners developed the "mini OTEC" experiment, which achieved the first successful at-sea production of net electrical power from closed-cycle OTEC. The mini OTEC vessel was moored 1.5 miles (2.4 km) off the Hawaiian coast and produced enough net electricity to illuminate the ship's light bulbs and run its computers and television.

=== Open ===
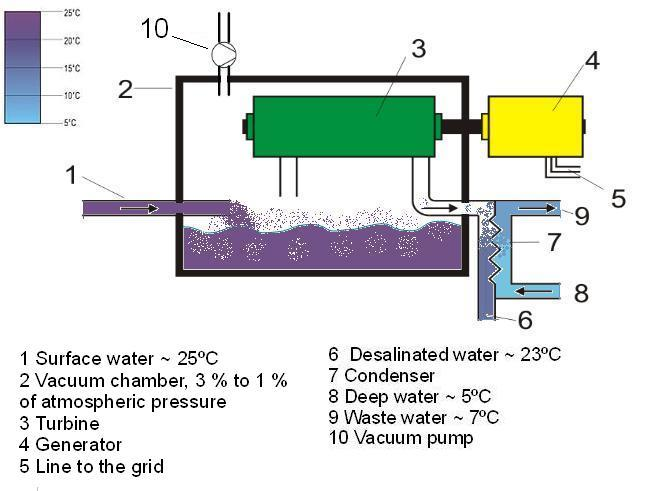
Diagram of an open cycle OTEC plant

Open-cycle OTEC uses warm surface water directly to make electricity. The warm seawater is first pumped into a low-pressure container, which causes it to boil. In some schemes, the expanding vapor drives a low-pressure turbine attached to an electrical generator. The vapor, which has left its salt and other contaminants in the low-pressure container, is pure fresh water. It is condensed into a liquid by exposure to cold temperatures from deep-ocean water. This method produces desalinized fresh water, suitable for drinking water, irrigation or aquaculture.

In other schemes, the rising vapor is used in a gas lift technique of lifting water to significant heights. Depending on the embodiment, such vapor lift pump techniques generate power from a hydroelectric turbine either before or after the pump is used.

In 1984, the Solar Energy Research Institute (now known as the National Renewable Energy Laboratory) developed a vertical-spout evaporator to convert warm seawater into low-pressure steam for open-cycle plants. Conversion efficiencies were as high as 97% for seawater-to-steam conversion (overall steam production would only be a few percent of the incoming water). In May 1993, an open-cycle OTEC plant at Keahole Point, Hawaii, produced close to 80 kW of electricity during a net power-producing experiment. This broke the record of 40 kW set by a Japanese system in 1982.

=== Hybrid ===
A hybrid cycle combines the features of the closed- and open-cycle systems. In a hybrid, warm seawater enters a vacuum chamber and is flash-evaporated, similar to the open-cycle evaporation process. The steam vaporizes the ammonia working fluid of a closed-cycle loop on the other side of an ammonia vaporizer. The vaporized fluid then drives a turbine to produce electricity. The steam condenses within the heat exchanger and provides desalinated water (see heat pipe).

=== Working fluids ===
A popular choice of working fluid is ammonia, which has superior transport properties, easy availability, and low cost. Ammonia, however, is toxic and flammable. Fluorinated carbons such as CFCs and HCFCs are not toxic or flammable, but they contribute to ozone layer depletion. Hydrocarbons too are good candidates, but they are highly flammable; in addition, this would create competition for use of them directly as fuels. The power plant size is dependent upon the vapor pressure of the working fluid. With increasing vapor pressure, the size of the turbine and heat exchangers decreases while the wall thickness of the pipe and heat exchangers increase to endure high pressure especially on the evaporator side.

== Land, shelf and floating sites ==
OTEC has the potential to produce gigawatts of electrical power, and in conjunction with electrolysis, could produce enough hydrogen to completely replace all projected global fossil fuel consumption. Reducing costs remains an unsolved challenge, however. OTEC plants require a long, large diameter intake pipe, which is submerged a kilometer or more into the ocean's depths, to bring cold water to the surface.

=== Land-based ===
Land-based and near-shore facilities offer three main advantages over those located in deep water. Plants constructed on or near land do not require sophisticated mooring, lengthy power cables, or the more extensive maintenance associated with open-ocean environments. They can be installed in sheltered areas so that they are relatively safe from storms and heavy seas. Electricity, desalinated water, and cold, nutrient-rich seawater could be transmitted from near-shore facilities via trestle bridges or causeways. In addition, land-based or near-shore sites allow plants to operate with related industries such as mariculture or those that require desalinated water.

Favored locations include those with narrow shelves (volcanic islands), steep (15–20 degrees) offshore slopes, and relatively smooth sea floors. These sites minimize the length of the intake pipe. A land-based plant could be built well inland from the shore, offering more protection from storms, or on the beach, where the pipes would be shorter. In either case, easy access for construction and operation helps lower costs.

Land-based or near-shore sites can also support mariculture or chilled water agriculture. Tanks or lagoons built on shore allow workers to monitor and control miniature marine environments. Mariculture products can be delivered to market via standard transport.

One disadvantage of land-based facilities arises from the turbulent wave action in the surf zone. OTEC discharge pipes should be placed in protective trenches to prevent subjecting them to extreme stress during storms and prolonged periods of heavy seas. Also, the mixed discharge of cold and warm seawater may need to be carried several hundred meters offshore to reach the proper depth before it is released, requiring additional expense in construction and maintenance.

One way that OTEC systems can avoid some of the problems and expenses of operating in a surf zone is by building them just offshore in waters ranging from 10 to 30 meters deep (Ocean Thermal Corporation 1984). This type of plant would use shorter (and therefore less costly) intake and discharge pipes, which would avoid the dangers of turbulent surf. The plant itself, however, would require protection from the marine environment, such as breakwaters and erosion-resistant foundations, and the plant output would need to be transmitted to shore.

=== Shelf based ===
To avoid the turbulent surf zone as well as to move closer to the cold-water resource, OTEC plants can be mounted to the continental shelf at depths up to 100 meters (330 ft). A shelf-mounted plant could be towed to the site and affixed to the sea bottom. This type of construction is already used for offshore oil rigs. The complexities of operating an OTEC plant in deeper water may make them more expensive than land-based approaches. Problems include the stress of open-ocean conditions and more difficult product delivery. Addressing strong ocean currents and large waves adds engineering and construction expense. Platforms require extensive pilings to maintain a stable base. Power delivery can require long underwater cables to reach land. For these reasons, shelf-mounted plants are less attractive.

=== Floating ===
Floating OTEC facilities operate off-shore. Although potentially optimal for large systems, floating facilities present several difficulties. The difficulty of mooring plants in very deep water complicates power delivery. Cables attached to floating platforms are more susceptible to damage, especially during storms. Cables at depths greater than 1000 meters are difficult to maintain and repair. Riser cables, which connect the sea bed and the plant, need to be constructed to resist entanglement.

As with shelf-mounted plants, floating plants need a stable base for continuous operation. Major storms and heavy seas can break the vertically suspended cold-water pipe and interrupt warm water intake as well. To help prevent these problems, pipes can be made of flexible polyethylene attached to the bottom of the platform and gimballed with joints or collars. Pipes may need to be uncoupled from the plant to prevent storm damage. As an alternative to a warm-water pipe, surface water can be drawn directly into the platform; however, it is necessary to prevent the intake flow from being damaged or interrupted during violent motions caused by heavy seas.

Connecting a floating plant to power delivery cables requires the plant to remain relatively stationary. Mooring is an acceptable method, but current mooring technology is limited to depths of about 2,000 meters (6,600 ft). Even at shallower depths, the cost of mooring may be prohibitive.

== Political concerns ==
Because OTEC facilities are more-or-less stationary surface platforms, their exact location and legal status may be affected by the United Nations Convention on the Law of the Sea treaty (UNCLOS). This treaty grants coastal nations 12-and-200-nautical-mile (22 and 370 km) zones of varying legal authority from land, creating potential conflicts and regulatory barriers. OTEC plants and similar structures would be considered artificial islands under the treaty, giving them no independent legal status. OTEC plants could be perceived as either a threat or potential partner to fisheries or to seabed mining operations controlled by the International Seabed Authority.

== Cost and economics ==
Because OTEC systems have not yet been widely deployed, cost estimates are uncertain. A 2010 study by University of Hawaii estimated the cost of electricity for OTEC at 94.0 cents per kilowatt hour (kWh) for a 1.4 MW plant, 44.0 cents per kWh for a 10 MW plant, and 18.0 cents per kWh for a 100 MW plant. A 2015 report by the organization Ocean Energy Systems under the International Energy Agency gave an estimate of about 20.0 cents per kWh for 100 MW plants. Another study estimated power generation costs as low as 7.0 cents per kWh. Comparing to other energy sources, a 2019 study by Lazard estimated the unsubsidized cost of electricity to 3.2 to 4.2 cents per kWh for Solar PV at utility scale and 2.8 to 5.4 cents per kWh for wind power.

A report published by IRENA in 2014 claimed that commercial use of OTEC technology can be scaled in a variety of ways. According to this report, "[S]mall-scale OTEC plants can be made to accommodate the electricity production of small communities (5,000–50,000 residents), but would require the production of valuable by-products – like fresh water or cooling – to be economically viable." Larger scaled OTEC plants would have much higher overhead and installation costs.

Beneficial factors that should be taken into account include OTEC's lack of waste products and fuel consumption, the area in which it is available (often within 20° of the equator), the geopolitical effects of petroleum dependence, compatibility with alternate forms of ocean power such as wave energy, tidal energy and methane hydrates, and supplemental uses for the seawater.

== Proposed projects ==
OTEC projects under consideration include a small plant for the U.S. Navy base on the British overseas territory island of Diego Garcia in the Indian Ocean. Ocean Thermal Energy Corporation (formerly OCEES International, Inc.) is working with the U.S. Navy on a design for a proposed 13 MW OTEC plant, to replace the current diesel generators. The OTEC plant would also provide 1.25 million gallons per day of potable water. This project is currently waiting for changes in US military contract policies. OTE has proposed building a 10 MW OTEC plant in Guam.

=== Bahamas ===
Ocean Thermal Energy Corporation (OTE) currently has plans to install two 10 MW OTEC plants in the US Virgin Islands and a 5–10 MW OTEC facility in The Bahamas. OTE has also designed the world's largest Seawater Air Conditioning (SWAC) plant for a resort in The Bahamas, which will use cold deep seawater as a method of air-conditioning. In mid-2015, the 95%-complete project was temporarily put on hold while the resort resolved financial and ownership issues. On August 22, 2016, the government of the Bahamas announced that a new agreement had been signed under which the Baha Mar resort would be completed. On September 27, 2016, Bahamian Prime Minister Perry Christie announced that construction had resumed on Baha Mar, and that the resort was slated to open in March 2017.

On September 25, 2026, Global OTEC were awarded a feasibility study for a new OTEC project in The Bahamas, looking at the combination of energy, water production and cooling, tied to a prospective data center project.

=== Hawaii ===
Lockheed Martin's Alternative Energy Development team has partnered with Makai Ocean Engineering to complete the final design phase of a 10-MW closed cycle OTEC pilot system which planned to become operational in Hawaii in the 2012–2013 time frame. This system was designed to expand to 100 MW commercial systems in the near future. In November 2010 the U.S. Naval Facilities Engineering Command (NAVFAC) awarded Lockheed Martin a US$4.4 million contract modification to develop critical system components and designs for the plant, adding to the 2009 $8.1 million contract and two Department of Energy grants totaling over $1 million in 2008 and March 2010. A small but operational ocean thermal energy conversion (OTEC) plant was inaugurated in Hawaii in August 2015. The opening of the research and development 100-kilowatt facility marked the first time a closed-cycle OTEC plant was connected to the U.S. grid.

=== Hainan ===
On April 13, 2013, Lockheed contracted with the Reignwood Group to build a 10 megawatt plant off the coast of southern China to provide power for a planned resort on Hainan island. A plant of that size would power several thousand homes. The Reignwood Group acquired Opus Offshore in 2011 which forms its Reignwood Ocean Engineering division which also is engaged in development of deepwater drilling.

=== Japan ===
Currently the only continuously operating OTEC system is located in Okinawa Prefecture, Japan. The Governmental support, local community support, and advanced research carried out by Saga University were key for the contractors, IHI Plant Construction Co. Ltd, Yokogawa Electric Corporation, and Xenesys, to succeed with this project. Work is being conducted to develop a 1MW facility on Kume Island requiring new pipelines. In July 2014, more than 50 members formed the Global Ocean reSource and Energy Association an international organization formed to promote the development of the Kumejima Model and work towards the installation of larger deep seawater pipelines and a 1MW OTEC Facility. The companies involved in the current OTEC projects, along with other interested parties have developed plans for offshore OTEC systems as well.

=== United States Virgin Islands ===
On March 5, 2014, Ocean Thermal Energy Corporation (OTEC) and the 30th Legislature of the United States Virgin Islands (USVI) signed a Memorandum of Understanding to move forward with a study to evaluate the feasibility and potential benefits to the USVI of installing on-shore Ocean Thermal Energy Conversion (OTEC) renewable energy power plants and Seawater Air Conditioning (SWAC) facilities. The benefits to be assessed in the USVI study include both the baseload (24/7) clean electricity generated by OTEC, as well as the various related products associated with OTEC and SWAC, including abundant fresh drinking water, energy-saving air conditioning, sustainable aquaculture and mariculture, and agricultural enhancement projects for the Islands of St Thomas and St Croix.

On July 18, 2016, OTE's application to be a Qualifying Facility was approved by the Virgin Islands Public Services Commission. OTE also received permission to begin negotiating contracts associated with this project.

=== Kiribati ===
South Korea's Research Institute of Ships and Ocean Engineering (KRISO) received approval in principle from Bureau Veritas for their 1MW offshore OTEC design. No timeline was given for the project which will be located 6 km offshore of the Republic of Kiribati.

=== Martinique ===
Akuo Energy and DCNS were awarded NER300 funding on July 8, 2014 for their NEMO (New Energy for Martinique and Overseas) project which is expected to be a 10.7 MW-net offshore facility completed in 2020. The award to help with development totaled €72 million.

=== Maldives ===
On February 16, 2018, Global OTEC Resources announced plans to build a 150 kW plant in the Maldives, designed bespoke for hotels and resorts. Director Dan Grech said, "All these resorts draw their power from diesel generators. Moreover, some individual resorts consume 7,000 litres of diesel a day to meet demands which equates to over 6,000 tonnes of CO_{2} annually". The EU awarded a grant and Global OTEC resources launched a crowdfunding campaign for the rest.

== Related activities ==
OTEC has uses other than power production.

=== Desalination ===
Desalinated water can be produced in open- or hybrid-cycle plants using surface condensers to turn evaporated seawater into potable water. System analysis indicates that a 2-megawatt plant could produce about 4,300 cubic metres (150,000 cu ft) of desalinated water each day. Another system patented by Richard Bailey creates condensate water by regulating deep ocean water flow through surface condensers correlating with fluctuating dew-point temperatures. This condensation system uses no incremental energy and has no moving parts.

On March 22, 2015, Saga University opened a Flash-type desalination demonstration facility on Kumejima. This satellite of their Institute of Ocean Energy uses post-OTEC deep seawater from the Okinawa OTEC Demonstration Facility and raw surface seawater to produce desalinated water. Air is extracted from the closed system with a vacuum pump. When raw sea water is pumped into the flash chamber it boils, allowing pure steam to rise and the salt and remaining seawater to be removed. The steam is returned to liquid in a heat exchanger with cold post-OTEC deep seawater. The desalinated water can be used in hydrogen production or drinking water (if minerals are added).

The NELHA plant established in 1993 produced an average of 7,000 gallons of freshwater per day. KOYO USA was established in 2002 to capitalize on this new economic opportunity. KOYO bottles the water produced by the NELHA plant in Hawaii. With the capacity to produce one million bottles of water every day, KOYO is now Hawaii's biggest exporter with $140 million in sales.[81]

=== Air conditioning ===
The 41 °F (5 °C) cold seawater made available by an OTEC system creates an opportunity to provide large amounts of cooling to industries and homes near the plant. The water can be used in chilled-water coils to provide air conditioning for buildings. It is estimated that a pipe 1 foot (0.30 m) in diameter can deliver 4,700 gallons of water per minute. Water at 43 °F (6 °C) could provide more than enough air conditioning for a large building. Operating 8,000 hours per year in lieu of electrical conditioning selling for 5–10¢ per kilowatt-hour, it would save $200,000-$400,000 in energy bills annually.

The InterContinental Resort and Thalasso-Spa on the island of Bora Bora uses an SWAC system to air-condition its buildings. The system passes seawater through a heat exchanger where it cools freshwater in a closed loop system. This freshwater is then pumped to buildings and directly cools the air.

In 2010, Copenhagen Energy opened a district cooling plant in Copenhagen, Denmark. The plant delivers cold seawater to commercial and industrial buildings, and has reduced electricity consumption by 80 percent. Ocean Thermal Energy Corporation (OTE) has designed a 9800-ton SDC system for a vacation resort in The Bahamas.

=== Chilled-soil agriculture ===
OTEC technology supports chilled-soil agriculture. When cold seawater flows through underground pipes, it chills the surrounding soil. The temperature difference between roots in the cool soil and leaves in the warm air allows plants that evolved in temperate climates to be grown in the subtropics. Dr. John P. Craven, Dr. Jack Davidson and Richard Bailey patented this process and demonstrated it at a research facility at the Natural Energy Laboratory of Hawaii Authority (NELHA). The research facility demonstrated that more than 100 different crops can be grown using this system. Many normally could not survive in Hawaii or at Keahole Point.

Japan has also been researching agricultural uses of Deep Sea Water since 2000 at the Okinawa Deep Sea Water Research Institute on Kume Island. The Kume Island facilities use regular water cooled by Deep Sea Water in a heat exchanger run through pipes in the ground to cool soil. Their techniques have developed an important resource for the island community as they now produce spinach, a winter vegetable, commercially year round. An expansion of the deep seawater agriculture facility was completed by Kumejima Town next to the OTEC Demonstration Facility in 2014. The new facility is for researching the economic practicality of chilled-soil agriculture on a larger scale.

=== Aquaculture ===
Aquaculture is the best-known byproduct, because it reduces the financial and energy costs of pumping large volumes of water from the deep ocean. Deep ocean water contains high concentrations of essential nutrients that are depleted in surface waters due to biological consumption. This artificial upwelling mimics the natural upwellings that are responsible for fertilizing and supporting the world's largest marine ecosystems, and the largest densities of life on the planet.

Cold-water sea animals, such as salmon and lobster, thrive in this nutrient-rich, deep seawater. Microalgae such as Spirulina, a health food supplement, also can be cultivated. Deep-ocean water can be combined with surface water to deliver water at an optimal temperature.

Non-native species such as salmon, lobster, abalone, trout, oysters, and clams can be raised in pools supplied by OTEC-pumped water. This extends the variety of fresh seafood products available for nearby markets. Such low-cost refrigeration can be used to maintain the quality of harvested fish, which deteriorate quickly in warm tropical regions. In Kona, Hawaii, aquaculture companies working with NELHA generate about $40 million annually, a significant portion of Hawaii's GDP.

=== Hydrogen production ===
Hydrogen can be produced via electrolysis using OTEC electricity. Generated steam with electrolyte compounds added to improve efficiency is a relatively pure medium for hydrogen production. OTEC can be scaled to generate large quantities of hydrogen. The main challenge is cost relative to other energy sources and fuels.

=== Mineral extraction ===
The ocean contains 57 trace elements in salts and other forms and dissolved in solution. In the past, most economic analyses concluded that mining the ocean for trace elements would be unprofitable, in part because of the energy required to pump the water. Mining generally targets minerals that occur in high concentrations, and can be extracted easily, such as magnesium. With OTEC plants supplying water, the only cost is for extraction. The Japanese investigated the possibility of extracting uranium and found developments in other technologies (especially materials sciences) were improving the prospects.

=== Climate control ===
Ocean thermal gradient can be used to enhance rainfall and moderate the high ambient summer temperatures in tropics to benefit enormously the mankind and the flora and fauna. When sea surface temperatures are relatively high on an area, lower atmospheric pressure area is formed compared to atmospheric pressure prevailing on the nearby land mass inducing winds from the landmass towards the ocean. Oceanward winds are dry and warm which would not contribute to good rainfall on the landmass compared to landward moist winds. For adequate rainfall and comfortable summer ambient temperatures (below 35 °C) on the landmass, it is preferred to have landward moist winds from the ocean. Creating high pressure zones by artificial upwelling on sea area selectively can also be used to deflect / guide the normal monsoon global winds towards the landmass. Artificial upwelling of nutrient-rich deep ocean water to the surface also enhances fisheries growth in areas with tropical and temperate weather. It would also lead to enhanced carbon sequestration by the oceans from improved algae growth and mass gain by glaciers from the extra snow fall mitigating sea level rise or global warming process. Tropical cyclones also do not pass through the high pressure zones as they intensify by gaining energy from the warm surface waters of the sea.

The cold deep sea water (<10 °C) is pumped to the sea surface area to suppress the sea surface temperature (>26 °C) by artificial means using electricity produced by mega scale floating wind turbine plants on the deep sea. The lower sea water surface temperature would enhance the local ambient pressure so that atmospheric landward winds are created. For upwelling the cold sea water, a stationary hydraulically driven propeller (≈50 m diameter) is located on the deep sea floor at 500 to 1000 m depth with a flexible draft tube extending up to the sea surface. The draft tube is anchored to the sea bed at its bottom side and top side to floating pontoons at the sea surface. The flexible draft tube would not collapse as its inside pressure is more compared to outside pressure when the colder water is pumped to the sea surface. Middle east, north east Africa, Indian subcontinent and Australia can get relief from hot and dry weather in summer season, also prone to erratic rainfall, by pumping deep sea water to the sea surface from the Persian gulf, Red sea, Indian Ocean and Pacific Ocean respectively.

== Thermodynamics ==
A rigorous treatment of OTEC reveals that a 20 °C temperature difference will provide as much energy as a hydroelectric plant with 34 m head for the same volume of water flow. The low temperature difference means that water volumes must be very large to extract useful amounts of heat. A 100MW power plant would be expected to pump on the order of 12 million gallons (44,400 tonnes) per minute. For comparison, pumps must move a mass of water greater than the weight of the battleship Bismarck, which weighed 41,700 tonnes, every minute. This makes pumping a substantial parasitic drain on energy production in OTEC systems, with one Lockheed design consuming 19.55 MW in pumping costs for every 49.8 MW net electricity generated. For OTEC schemes using heat exchangers, to handle this volume of water the exchangers need to be enormous compared to those used in conventional thermal power generation plants, making them one of the most critical components due to their impact on overall efficiency. A 100 MW OTEC power plant would require 200 exchangers each larger than a 20-foot shipping container making them the single most expensive component.

=== Variation of ocean temperature with depth ===
Chart of different thermoclines (depth vs. temperature) based on seasons and latitude

The total insolation received by the oceans (covering 70% of the earth's surface, with clearness index of 0.5 and average energy retention of 15%) is: 5.45×10^{18} MJ/yr × 0.7 × 0.5 × 0.15 = 2.87×10^{17} MJ/yr

We can use Beer–Lambert–Bouguer's law to quantify the solar energy absorption by water,

$$-\frac{dI(y)}{dy}=\mu I$$

where, y is the depth of water, I is intensity and μ is the absorption coefficient. Solving the above differential equation,

$$I(y)=I_{0}\exp(-\mu y) \,$$

The absorption coefficient μ may range from 0.05 m^{−1} for very clear fresh water to 0.5 m^{−1} for very salty water.

Since the intensity falls exponentially with depth y, heat absorption is concentrated at the top layers. Typically in the tropics, surface temperature values are in excess of 25 °C (77 °F), while at 1 kilometer (0.62 mi), the temperature is about 5–10 °C (41–50 °F). The warmer (and hence lighter) waters at the surface means there are no thermal convection currents. Due to the small temperature gradients, heat transfer by conduction is too low to equalize the temperatures. The ocean is thus both a practically infinite heat source and a practically infinite heat sink.

This temperature difference varies with latitude and season, with the maximum in tropical, subtropical and equatorial waters. Hence the tropics are generally the best OTEC locations.

=== Open/Claude cycle ===
In this scheme, warm surface water at around 27 °C (81 °F) enters an evaporator at pressure slightly below the saturation pressures causing it to vaporize.

$$H_{1}=H_{f} \,$$

Where H_{f} is enthalpy of liquid water at the inlet temperature, T_{1}.

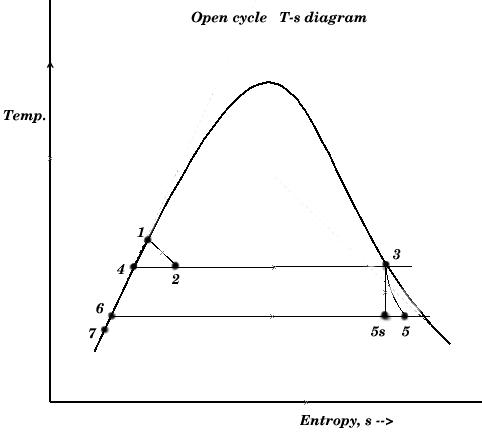

This temporarily superheated water undergoes volume boiling as opposed to pool boiling in conventional boilers where the heating surface is in contact. Thus the water partially flashes to steam with two-phase equilibrium prevailing. Suppose that the pressure inside the evaporator is maintained at the saturation pressure, T_{2}.

$$H_{2}=H_{1}=H_{f}+x_{2}H_{fg} \,$$

Here, x_{2} is the fraction of water by mass that vaporizes. The warm water mass flow rate per unit turbine mass flow rate is 1/x_{2}.

The low pressure in the evaporator is maintained by a vacuum pump that also removes the dissolved non-condensable gases from the evaporator. The evaporator now contains a mixture of water and steam of very low vapor quality (steam content). The steam is separated from the water as saturated vapor. The remaining water is saturated and is discharged to the ocean in the open cycle. The steam is a low pressure/high specific volume working fluid. It expands in a special low pressure turbine.

$$H_{3}=H_{g} \,$$

Here, H_{g} corresponds to T_{2}. For an ideal isentropic (reversible adiabatic) turbine,

$$s_{5,s}=s_{3}=s_{f}+x_{5,s}s_{fg} \,$$

The above equation corresponds to the temperature at the exhaust of the turbine, T_{5}. x_{5,s} is the mass fraction of vapor at state 5.

The enthalpy at T_{5} is,

$$H_{5,s}=H_{f}+x_{5,s}H_{fg} \,$$

This enthalpy is lower. The adiabatic reversible turbine work = H_{3}-H_{5,s}.

Actual turbine work W_{T} = (H_{3}-H_{5,s}) x polytropic efficiency

$$H_{5}=H_{3}-\ \mathrm{actual}\ \mathrm{work}$$

The condenser temperature and pressure are lower. Since the turbine exhaust is to be discharged back into the ocean, a direct contact condenser is used to mix the exhaust with cold water, which results in a near-saturated water. That water is now discharged back to the ocean.

H_{6}=H_{f}, at T_{5}. T_{7} is the temperature of the exhaust mixed with cold sea water, as the vapor content now is negligible,

$$H_{7}\approx H_{f}\,\ at\ T_{7} \,$$

The temperature differences between stages include that between warm surface water and working steam, that between exhaust steam and cooling water, and that between cooling water reaching the condenser and deep water. These represent external irreversibilities that reduce the overall temperature difference.

The cold water flow rate per unit turbine mass flow rate,

$$\dot{m_{c}=\frac{H_{5}-\ H_{6}}{H_{6}-\ H_{7}}} \,$$

Turbine mass flow rate, $\dot{M_{T}}=\frac{\mathrm{turbine}\ \mathrm{work}\ \mathrm{required}}{W_{T}}$

Warm water mass flow rate, $\dot{M_{w}}=\dot{M_{T}\dot{m_{w}}} \,$

Cold water mass flow rate $\dot{\dot{M_{c}}=\dot{M_{T}m_{C}}} \,$

=== Closed Anderson cycle ===
As developed starting in the 1960s by J. Hilbert Anderson of Sea Solar Power, Inc., in this cycle, Q_{H} is the heat transferred in the evaporator from the warm sea water to the working fluid. The working fluid exits the evaporator as a gas near its dew point.

The high-pressure, high-temperature gas then is expanded in the turbine to yield turbine work, W_{T}. The working fluid is slightly superheated at the turbine exit and the turbine typically has an efficiency of 90% based on reversible, adiabatic expansion.

From the turbine exit, the working fluid enters the condenser where it rejects heat, -Q_{C}, to the cold sea water. The condensate is then compressed to the highest pressure in the cycle, requiring condensate pump work, W_{C}. Thus, the Anderson closed cycle is a Rankine-type cycle similar to the conventional power plant steam cycle except that in the Anderson cycle the working fluid is never superheated more than a few degrees Fahrenheit. Owing to viscosity effects, working fluid pressure drops in both the evaporator and the condenser. This pressure drop, which depends on the types of heat exchangers used, must be considered in final design calculations but is ignored here to simplify the analysis. Thus, the parasitic condensate pump work, W_{C}, computed here will be lower than if the heat exchanger pressure drop was included. The major additional parasitic energy requirements in the OTEC plant are the cold water pump work, W_{CT}, and the warm water pump work, W_{HT}. Denoting all other parasitic energy requirements by W_{A}, the net work from the OTEC plant, W_{NP} is

$$W_{NP}=W_{T}-W_{C}-W_{CT}-W_{HT}-W_{A} \,$$

The thermodynamic cycle undergone by the working fluid can be analyzed without detailed consideration of the parasitic energy requirements. From the first law of thermodynamics, the energy balance for the working fluid as the system is

$$W_{N}=Q_{H}-Q_{C} \,$$

where W_{N} = W_{T} + W_{C} is the net work for the thermodynamic cycle. For the idealized case in which there is no working fluid pressure drop in the heat exchangers,

$$Q_{H}=\int_{H}T_{H}ds \,$$

and

$$Q_{C}=\int_{C}T_{C}ds \,$$

so that the net thermodynamic cycle work becomes

$$W_{N}=\int_{H}T_{H}ds-\int_{C}T_{C}ds \,$$

Subcooled liquid enters the evaporator. Due to the heat exchange with warm sea water, evaporation takes place and usually superheated vapor leaves the evaporator. This vapor drives the turbine and the 2-phase mixture enters the condenser. Usually, the subcooled liquid leaves the condenser and finally, this liquid is pumped to the evaporator completing a cycle.

== Environmental impact ==
Carbon dioxide dissolved in deep cold and high pressure layers is brought up to the surface and released as the water warms.

Mixing of deep ocean water with shallower water brings up nutrients and makes them available to shallow water life. This may be an advantage for aquaculture of commercially important species, but may also unbalance the ecological system around the power plant.

OTEC plants use very large flows of warm surface seawater and cold deep seawater to generate constant renewable power. The deep seawater is oxygen deficient and generally 20–40 times more nutrient rich (in nitrate and nitrite) than shallow seawater. When these plumes are mixed, they are slightly denser than the ambient seawater. Though no large scale physical environmental testing of OTEC has been done, computer models have been developed to simulate the effect of OTEC plants.

=== Hydrodynamic modeling ===
In 2010, a computer model was developed to simulate the physical oceanographic effects of one or several 100 megawatt OTEC plant(s). The model suggests that OTEC plants can be configured such that the plant can conduct continuous operations, with resulting temperature and nutrient variations that are within naturally occurring levels. Studies to date suggest that by discharging the OTEC flows downwards at a depth below 70 meters, the dilution is adequate and nutrient enrichment is small enough so that 100-megawatt OTEC plants could be operated in a sustainable manner on a continuous basis.

=== Biological modeling ===
The nutrients from an OTEC discharge could potentially cause increased biological activity if they accumulate in large quantities in the photic zone. In 2011 a biological component was added to the hydrodynamic computer model to simulate the biological response to plumes from 100 megawatt OTEC plants. In all cases modeled (discharge at 70 meters depth or more), no unnatural variations occurs in the upper 40 meters of the ocean's surface. The picoplankton response in the 110 - 70 meter depth layer is approximately a 10–25% increase, which is well within naturally occurring variability. The nanoplankton response is negligible. The enhanced productivity of diatoms (microplankton) is small. The subtle phytoplankton increase of the baseline OTEC plant suggests that higher-order biochemical effects will be very small.

=== Studies ===
A previous Final Environmental Impact Statement (EIS) for the United States' NOAA from 1981 is available, but needs to be brought up to current oceanographic and engineering standards. Studies have been done to propose the best environmental baseline monitoring practices, focusing on a set of ten chemical oceanographic parameters relevant to OTEC. Most recently, NOAA held an OTEC Workshop in 2010 and 2012 seeking to assess the physical, chemical, and biological impacts and risks, and identify information gaps or needs.

The Tethys database provides access to scientific literature and general information on the potential environmental effects of OTEC.

== Technical difficulties ==
=== Dissolved gases ===
The performance of direct contact heat exchangers operating at typical OTEC boundary conditions is important to the Claude cycle. Many early Claude cycle designs used a surface condenser since their performance was well understood. However, direct contact condensers offer significant disadvantages. As cold water rises in the intake pipe, the pressure decreases to the point where gas begins to evolve. If a significant amount of gas comes out of solution, placing a gas trap before the direct contact heat exchangers may be justified. Experiments simulating conditions in the warm water intake pipe indicated about 30% of the dissolved gas evolves in the top 8.5 meters (28 ft) of the tube. The trade-off between pre-deaeration of the seawater and expulsion of non-condensable gases from the condenser is dependent on the gas evolution dynamics, deaerator efficiency, head loss, vent compressor efficiency and parasitic power. Experimental results indicate vertical spout condensers perform some 30% better than falling jet types.

=== Microbial fouling ===
Because raw seawater must pass through the heat exchanger, care must be taken to maintain good thermal conductivity. Biofouling layers as thin as 25 to 50 micrometres (0.00098 to 0.00197 in) can degrade heat exchanger performance by as much as 50%. A 1977 study in which mock heat exchangers were exposed to seawater for ten weeks concluded that although the level of microbial fouling was low, the thermal conductivity of the system was significantly impaired. The apparent discrepancy between the level of fouling and the heat transfer impairment is the result of a thin layer of water trapped by the microbial growth on the surface of the heat exchanger.

Another study concluded that fouling degrades performance over time, and determined that although regular brushing was able to remove most of the microbial layer, over time a tougher layer formed that could not be removed through simple brushing. The study passed sponge rubber balls through the system. It concluded that although the ball treatment decreased the fouling rate it was not enough to completely halt growth and brushing was occasionally necessary to restore capacity. The microbes regrew more quickly later in the experiment (i.e. brushing became necessary more often) replicating the results of a previous study. The increased growth rate after subsequent cleanings appears to result from selection pressure on the microbial colony.

Continuous use of 1 hour per day and intermittent periods of free fouling and then chlorination periods (again 1 hour per day) were studied. Chlorination slowed but did not stop microbial growth; however chlorination levels of 0.1 mg per liter for 1 hour per day may prove effective for long term operation of a plant. The study concluded that although microbial fouling was an issue for the warm surface water heat exchanger, the cold water heat exchanger suffered little or no biofouling and only minimal inorganic fouling.

Besides water temperature, microbial fouling also depends on nutrient levels, with growth occurring faster in nutrient rich water. The fouling rate also depends on the material used to construct the heat exchanger. Aluminium tubing slows the growth of microbial life, although the oxide layer which forms on the inside of the pipes complicates cleaning and leads to larger efficiency losses. In contrast, titanium tubing allows biofouling to occur faster but cleaning is more effective than with aluminium.

=== Sealing ===
The evaporator, turbine, and condenser operate in partial vacuum ranging from 3% to 1% of atmospheric pressure. The system must be carefully sealed to prevent in-leakage of atmospheric air that can degrade or shut down operation. In closed-cycle OTEC, the specific volume of low-pressure steam is very large compared to that of the pressurized working fluid. Components must have large flow areas to ensure steam velocities do not attain excessively high values.

=== Parasitic power consumption by exhaust compressor ===
An approach for reducing the exhaust compressor parasitic power loss is as follows. After most of the steam has been condensed by spout condensers, the non-condensible gas steam mixture is passed through a counter current region which increases the gas-steam reaction by a factor of five. The result is an 80% reduction in the exhaust pumping power requirements.

== Cold air/warm water conversion ==
In winter in coastal Arctic locations, the temperature difference between the seawater and ambient air can be as high as 40 °C (72 °F). Closed-cycle systems could exploit the air-water temperature difference. Eliminating seawater extraction pipes might make a system based on this concept less expensive than OTEC. This technology is due to H. Barjot, who suggested butane as cryogen, because of its boiling point of −0.5 °C (31.1 °F) and its non-solubility in water. Assuming a realistic level of efficiency of 4%, calculations show that the amount of energy generated with one cubic meter water at a temperature of 2 °C (36 °F) in a place with an air temperature of −22 °C (−8 °F) equals the amount of energy generated by letting this cubic meter water run through a hydroelectric plant of 4000 feet (1,200 m) height.

Barjot Polar Power Plants could be located on islands in the polar region or designed as swimming barges or platforms attached to the ice cap. The weather station Myggbuka at Greenlands east coast for example, which is only 2,100 km away from Glasgow, detects monthly mean temperatures below −15 °C (5 °F) during 6 winter months in the year.

== Application of the thermoelectric effect ==
In 1979 SERI proposed using the Seebeck effect to produce power with a total conversion efficiency of 2%.

In 2014 Liping Liu, Associate Professor at Rutgers University, envisioned an OTEC system that utilises the solid state thermoelectric effect rather than the fluid cycles traditionally used.

== See also ==
- Deep water source cooling
- Geothermal power
- Heat engine
- Floating wind turbine
- Ocean engineering
- Seawater air conditioning
- Thermogalvanic cell
- Marine energy
- Tidal power
- Wave power
- Osmotic power

== Sources ==
- William H. Avery; Chih Wu (17 March 1994). Renewable Energy From the Ocean: A Guide to OTEC. Johns Hopkins University Applied Physics Laboratories Series in Science and Engineering. Oxford, New York: Oxford University Press. ISBN 978-0-19-507199-3.
