= Deep water source cooling =

Air cooling method

Deep water source cooling (DWSC) or deep water air cooling is a form of air cooling for process and comfort space cooling which uses a large body of naturally cold water as a heat sink. It uses water at 4 to 10 °C (39 to 50 °F) drawn from deep areas within lakes, oceans, aquifer or rivers, which is pumped through one side of a heat exchanger, which cools warm water on the other side of the exchanger.

== Basic concept ==
Fresh water is most dense at 3.98 °C (39.16 °F) at standard atmospheric pressure. Thus as water cools or heats to 3.98 °C, it increases in density and will settle below. As the water temperature climbs above or below 3.98 °C, water density decreases and causes the water to rise, which is why lakes are warmer on the surface during the summer. The combination of these effects means that the bottom of most deep bodies of water located well away from the equatorial regions is at a constant 3.98 °C.

Air conditioners are heat pumps. During the summer, residential air conditioners use electricity to transfer heat from the cooler interior of a building to the warmer exterior.

Unlike residential air conditioners, most modern commercial air conditioning systems do not transfer heat directly into the exterior air. The thermodynamic efficiency of the overall system can be improved by utilizing evaporative cooling, where the temperature of the cooling water is lowered close to the wet-bulb temperature by evaporation in a cooling tower. This cooled water then acts as the heat sink for the heat pump.

Deep lake water cooling uses cold water pumped from the bottom of a lake as a heat sink for climate control systems. Because heat pump efficiency improves as the heat sink gets colder, deep lake water cooling can reduce the electrical demands of large cooling systems. It is similar in concept to modern geothermal sinks, but generally simpler to construct given a suitable water source.

Deep lake water cooling allows higher thermodynamic efficiency by using cold deep lake water, which is colder than the ambient wet-bulb temperature, consuming less electricity. For many buildings, the lake water is sufficiently cold that the refrigeration portion of the air-conditioning systems can be shut down during some environmental conditions and the building interior heat can be transferred directly to the lake water heat sink. This is referred to as "free cooling", reflecting the ability to take advantage of a natural heat sink, rather than create cold through the energy intense refrigeration cycle of compression and expansion of a contained refrigerant; Pumps are still required to circulate the water, including raising cold water hundreds of feet against great head pressure, and fans to circulate building air.

One added attraction of deep lake water cooling is that it saves energy during peak load times, such as summer afternoons, when a sizable amount of the total electrical grid load is air conditioning.

== Advantages ==
Deep water source cooling is very energy efficient, requiring only 1/10 of the average energy required by conventional cooler systems. Consequently, its running costs can also be expected to be much lower.

The energy source is very local and fully renewable, provided that the water and heat rejected into the environment (often the same lake or a nearby river) does not disturb the natural cycles. It does not use any ozone depleting refrigerant.

Depending on the building's cooling demand and local weather, deep water source cooling can often satisfy a complete portion of a building's cooling demand, eradicating a building's reliance on mechanical refrigeration provided through a chiller. This not only reduces the building's electrical demand (or steam demand for applications using absorption refrigeration), but also curtails dependency on evaporative cooling towers which can oftentimes harbor the fatal bacterium Legionella pneumophila. However, building operators must adhere to and practice correct disinfection procedures before restarting any cooling towers that remained dormant during cooler days when deep water source cooling was able to meet the building's cooling demand.

Depending on the needs and on the water temperature, coupled heating and cooling can be considered. For example, heat could first be extracted from the water (making it colder) and, secondly, the same water could cycle to a refrigerating unit to be used for even more effective cold production.

Lake temperature is rarely significantly changed by these systems. In Europe, lake-based heating and cooling could save 0.8 TWh per year, and is most promising in Italy, Germany, Turkey and Switzerland.

== Disadvantages ==
Deep water source cooling requires a large and deep water quantity in the surroundings. To obtain water in the 3 to 6 °C (37 to 43 °F) range, a depth of 50 to 70 m (160 to 230 ft) is generally required, depending on the local conditions.

The set-up of a system is expensive and labour-intensive. The system also requires a great amount of source material for its construction and placement.

Although deep water source cooling is referred to as "free cooling" in some literature, a considerable amount of energy (typically electrical) is expended to operate pumps with a sufficient head to overcome frictional and minor losses in distribution piping and any heat exchangers.

One study found lakes in Europe would only economically serve about 17% of the cooling demand and 7% of combined heating and cooling demand in nearby areas.

== First major system in the United States ==
Cornell University's Lake Source Cooling System uses Cayuga Lake as a heat sink to operate the central chilled water system for its campus and to also provide cooling to the Ithaca City School District. The system has operated since the summer of 2000 and was built for $55–60 million. It cools a 14,500 ton (51 megawatt) load. The intake pipe of the system is 3,200 m (10,500 ft) long and has a pipe diameter of 1,600 mm (63 in), installed at a depth of 229 m (751 ft), allowing access to water temperatures between 3–5 °C (37–41 °F). The water is returned to the lake through a 1,200 mm (47 in) outfall pipe, 780 m (2,560 ft) long. The pipe selected for the project was Sclairpipe, made from high-density polypropylene (HDPE). Estimated savings is an 80% reduction in fossil fuel previously required to operate a conventional electric cooling system.

== First system in Canada ==
Since August 2004, a deep lake water cooling system has been operated by the Enwave Energy Corporation in Toronto, Ontario. It draws water from Lake Ontario through tubes extending 5 kilometres (3.1 mi) into the lake, reaching to a depth of 83 metres (272 ft) where the water is maintained at a constant 4 °C (39 °F), its temperature protected by a layer of water above it, called a thermocline. The deep lake water cooling system is part of an integrated district cooling system that covers Toronto's financial district, and has a cooling power of 59,000 tons (207 MW). The system currently has enough capacity to cool 40,000,000 square feet (3,700,000 m^{2}) of office space.

The installed deep lake cooling water intake line was 1,600 mm (63 in) in diameter, 15,000 m (49,000 ft) long and installed at a depth of 85 m (279 ft) allowing access to water temperatures of between 3-5 C (37-41 F). The selected pipe was Sclairpipe, made from high-density polyethylene (HDPE) resin.

Water drawn from the depths of Lake Ontario is not circulated directly through terminal air-conditioning units within buildings. Instead, water from the Lake is circulated through a set of closed-loop heat exchangers in order to allow for a net transfer of thermal energy from heat-transfer fluid returning from buildings to the Lake water. Chilled water within the buildings is part of a closed-loop district cooling system, pumped from a centralized location where the heat exchangers are installed back to the buildings where it can absorb heat from fan coil units installed to provide latent and sensible space cooling.

The cold water drawn from Lake Ontario's deep layer in the Enwave system is not returned directly to the lake once it has been run through the heat exchange system. Instead, water is pumped to the city's water filtration plant for treatment and distribution to residential and commercial users.

== Sea water air conditioning ==
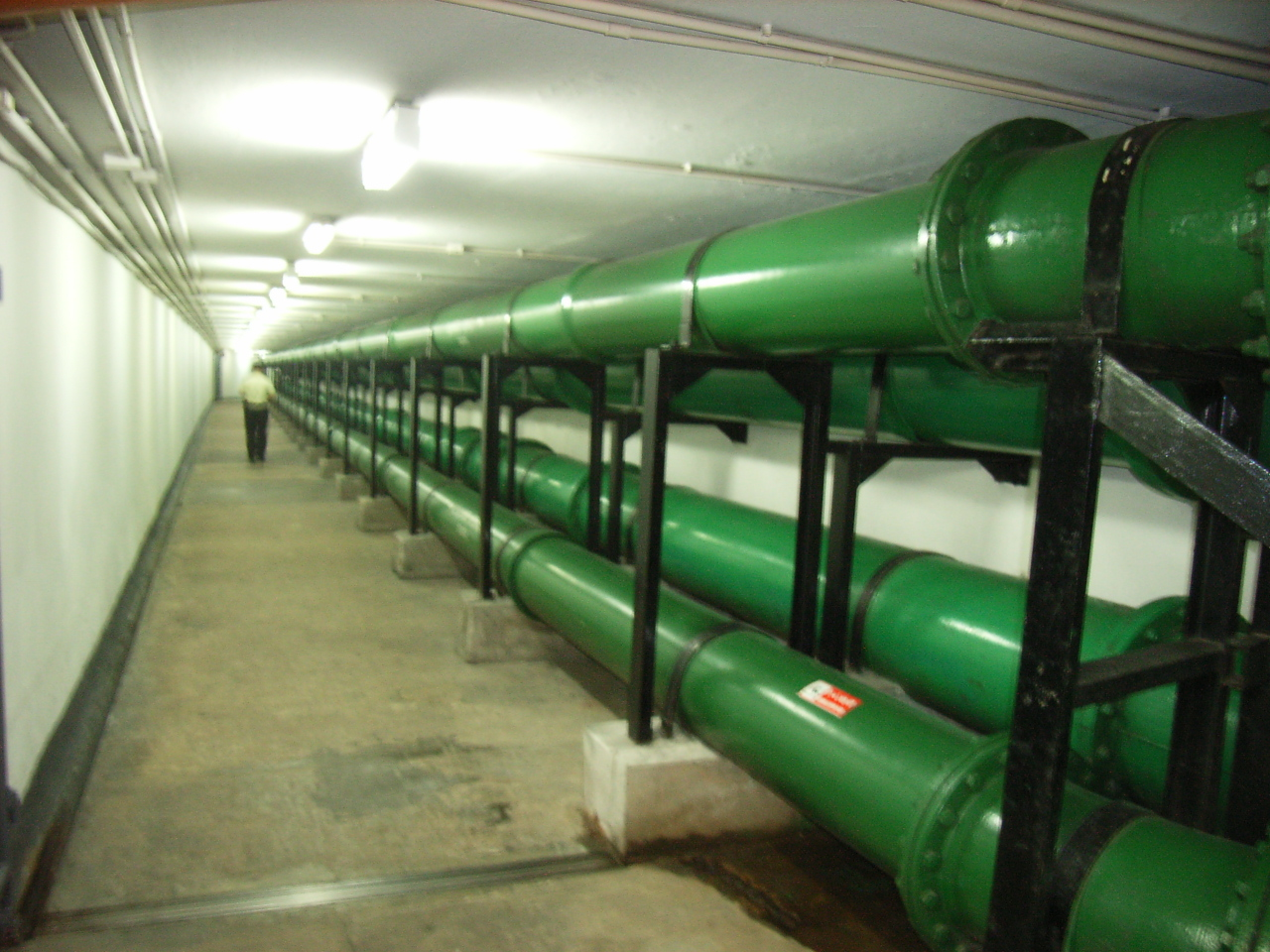
Seawater pipes of The Excelsior hotel system in Hong Kong

This version is also known as ocean water cooling. The InterContinental Resort and Thalasso-Spa on the island of Bora Bora uses a seawater air conditioning (SWAC) system to air condition its buildings. The system accomplishes this by passing cold seawater through a heat exchanger where it cools freshwater in a closed-loop system. This cool freshwater is then pumped to buildings and used for cooling directly—no conversion to electricity takes place. Similar systems are also in place in The Excelsior hotel and The Hong Kong and Shanghai Banking Corporation main building in Hong Kong, and at the Natural Energy Laboratory of Hawaii Authority.

Salt water air conditioning systems have been used in Sydney's Circular Quay and prominent buildings within the harbour since the rise of commercial air conditioning systems in the 1960s. These include the heritage-listed AMP 'Palm Cove' Building (constructed 1962) and the Sydney Opera House.

The InterContinental Resort is the largest seawater air conditioning system to date, though there are several other, larger systems being planned. Honolulu Seawater Air Conditioning was a project intended to use seawater air conditioning to deliver renewable cooling to commercial and residential properties in the downtown Honolulu area. On December 19, 2020, Honolulu Seawater Air Conditioning announced it was ending its development and would end operations by the end of January 2021. Honolulu Seawater Air Conditioning is majority owned by eBay founder Pierre Omidyar's Ulupono Initiative.

== See also ==
- District heating – Centralized heat distribution system
- District cooling – Delivery of chilled water to building needing cooling
- Free cooling – Using low external air temperatures to chill water
- Geothermal heat pump – System to transfer heat to/from the ground
- Sea water air conditioning
- Seasonal thermal energy storage – Storage of heat or cold for periods of up to several months
- Solar pond – Solar thermal energy
- Ocean energy – Energy available from oceans
- Ocean thermal energy conversion – Extracting energy from the ocean
