= Sea water air conditioning =

Alternative cooling system

Sea water air conditioning (SWAC), also known as ocean water cooling, is an alternative cooling system that uses the deep cold seawater as the chilling agent for a closed-loop fresh water distributed cooling system. It is one type of deep water source cooling. Once installed, SWAC systems typically operate at approximately 15% of the power consumption of conventional chillers. A SWAC system basically consists of deep seawater intake and return pipelines, titanium heat exchangers, seawater and freshwater pumps, and a distribution system for the chilled fresh water.

== Seawater air conditioning installations ==
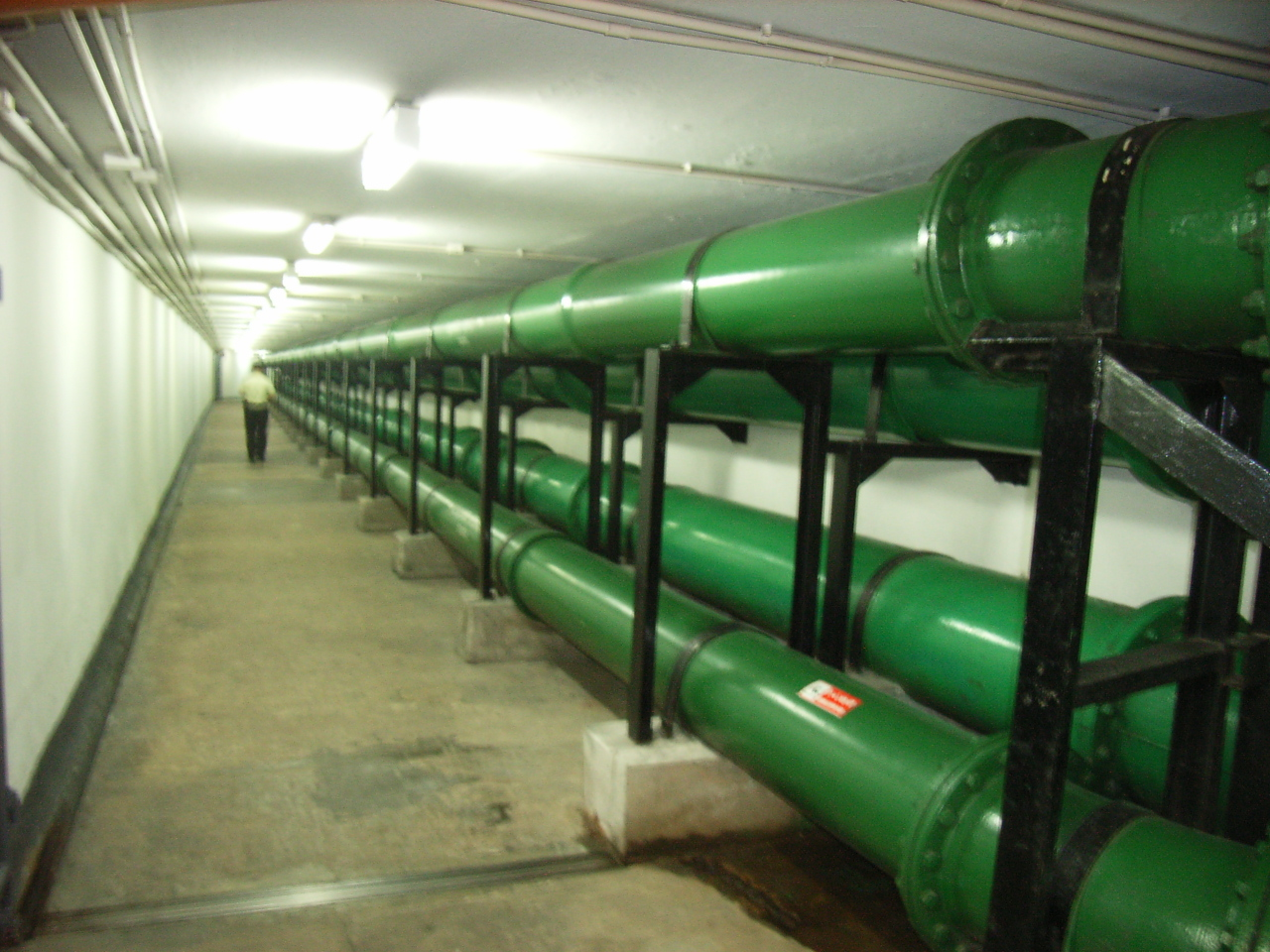
Seawater pipes of The Excelsior hotel system in Hong Kong.

The InterContinental Resort and Thalasso-Spa on the island of Bora Bora uses a seawater air conditioning (SWAC) system to air condition its buildings. The system accomplishes this by passing cold seawater through a heat exchanger where it cools freshwater in a closed loop system. This cool freshwater is then pumped to buildings and is used for cooling directly–no conversion to electricity takes place. Similar systems are also in place in The Excelsior hotel and The Hong Kong and Shanghai Banking Corporation main building in Hong Kong, and at the Natural Energy Laboratory of Hawaii Authority.

Sea water air conditioning systems have been used in Sydney's Circular Quay and prominent buildings within the harbour since the rise of commercial air conditioning systems in the 1960s. These include the heritage-listed AMP 'Palm Cove' Building (constructed 1962) and the Sydney Opera House.

The InterContinental Resort is the largest seawater air conditioning system to date, though there are several other, larger systems being planned. Honolulu Seawater Air Conditioning was a project intended to use seawater air conditioning to deliver renewable cooling to commercial and residential properties in the downtown Honolulu area. On December 19, 2020, Honolulu Seawater Air Conditioning announced it was ending its development and would end operations by the end of January 2021. Honolulu Seawater Air Conditioning is majority owned by eBay founder Pierre Omidyar's Ulupono Initiative.

Seawater air conditioning systems have been considered for US Naval Base Guam, and for hotels near Tuamon Bay.

== See also ==
- Deep Lake Water Cooling System
- District cooling
