= The Excelsior =

Closed skyscraper hotel in Hong Kong

Excelsior Hotel
- 怡東酒店
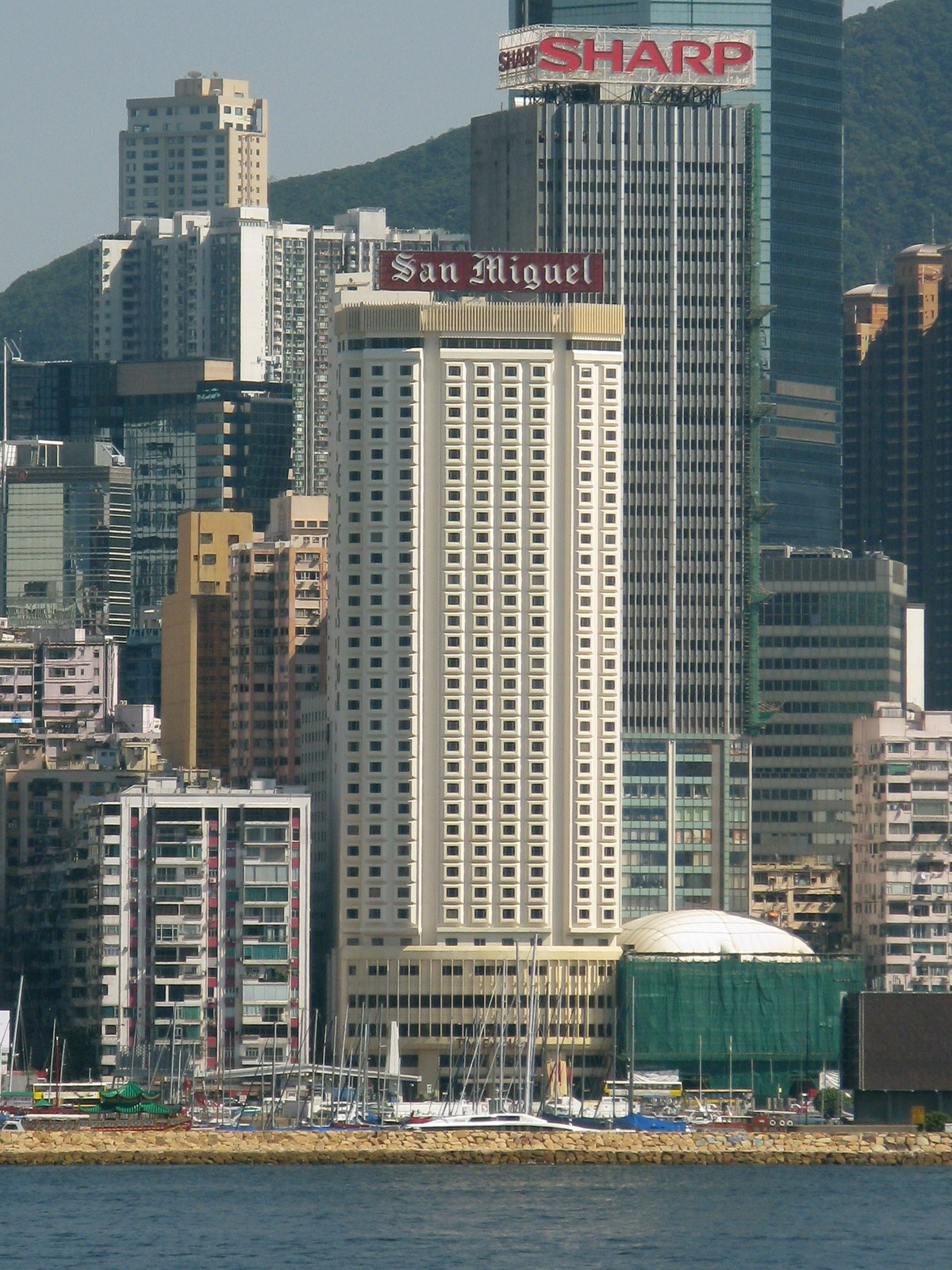
- Excelsior Hotel c. 2008
- Interactive map of the Excelsior Hotel area

General information
- Status: Demolished
- Type: Hotel
- Location: 281 Gloucester Road, Causeway Bay, Hong Kong
- Coordinates: 22°16′56.3″N 114°11′2.8″E
- Completed: 1973
- Opening: 20 February 1973
- Closed: March 31, 2019; 6 years ago
- Demolished: 2020
- Owner: Mandarin Oriental Hotel Group

Height
- Roof: 126.34 m (414.5 ft)

Technical details
- Floor count: 37

Other information
- Number of rooms: 854
- Number of suites: 21
- Number of restaurants: 5

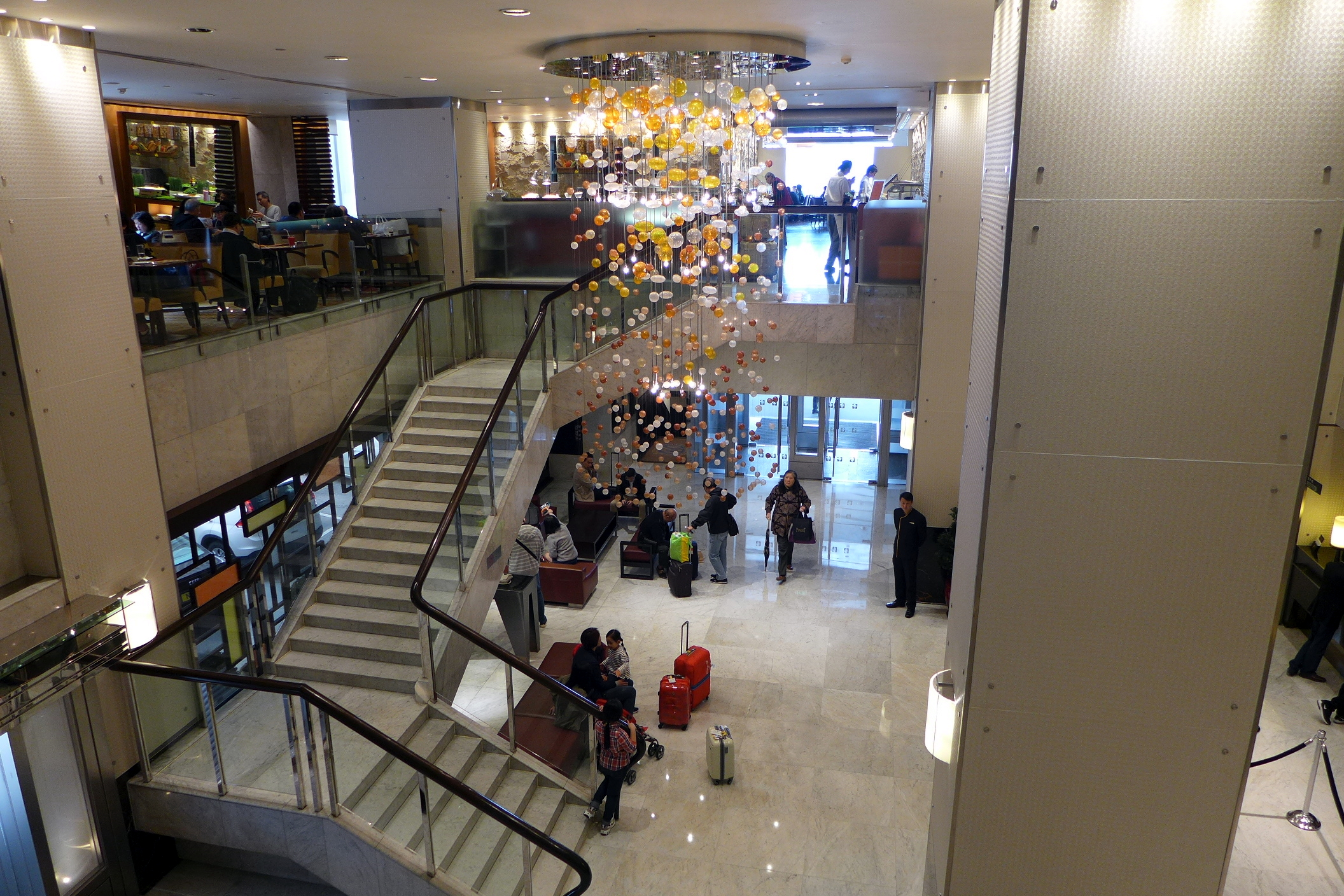
Lobby of The Excelsior in 2016

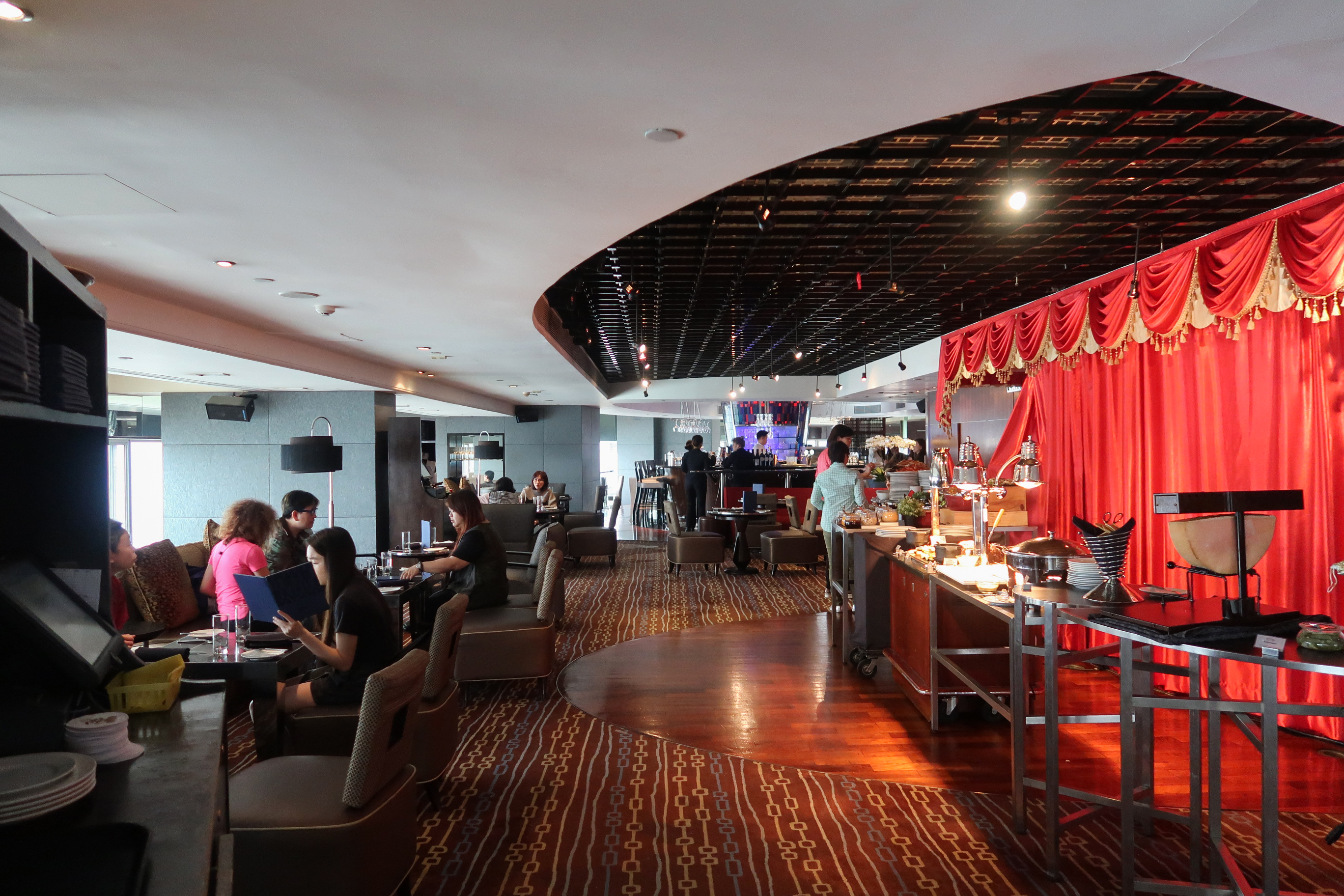
ToTT's and Roof Terrace in 2019

The Excelsior (Chinese: 怡東酒店) was a four-star hotel located at 281 Gloucester Road, Causeway Bay, Hong Kong Island, in Hong Kong. It was owned and operated by Mandarin Oriental Hotel Group, a member of the Jardine Matheson Group, and served as the Mandarin Oriental Hotel Group's headquarters. The Noon-day Gun is located opposite the hotel. It closed on 31 March 2019 for demolition and replacement by an office tower.

== History ==
The location of the hotel is "Lot No.1", which was the first plot of land sold at auction after Hong Kong became a British Colony in 1841. The hotel was developed on the original godown of Jardine Matheson and was officially opened on 20 February 1973. The hotel was the first in Hong Kong to have more than 1,000 rooms.

In 2015, the company obtained approval to redevelop the property into a commercial building, and it subsequently announced in June 2017 that it would test the market's interest as to a possible sale. No single bidder had met Mandarin's expectations, however, and the sale was withdrawn. The hotel closed on 31 March 2019, for demolition.

== Restaurants ==
The Excelsior had several cafés and restaurants:

- Dickens Bar (雙城吧), a sports bar and restaurant in the basement, "wood-panelled and bristling with memorabilia", that has been described as a traditional British gastropub.
- EXpresso, a café in the lobby.
- Café on the 1st (一樓咖啡室), a breakfast, lunch and dinner International buffet restaurant on the 1st floor.
- Cammino, an Italian restaurant on the 1st floor.
- Yee Tung Heen (怡東軒), a Michelin-starred Chinese restaurant on the 2nd floor.
- The Excelsior Grill on the 3rd floor.
- ToTT's and Roof Terrace, a bar and restaurant on the 34th floor. Originally called "Talk of the Town", it opened in 1979 as a disco and bar. It was renamed "ToTT's Asian Grill" in 1995. The outdoor terrace opened in 2009.

== Cooling system ==
Like several other buildings along the Victoria Harbour, the Excelsior Hotel used a seawater air conditioning system. The seawater source for the system originated from the Causeway Bay Typhoon Shelter.

== In popular culture ==
Parts of the 1978 comedy film Revenge of the Pink Panther were set in The Excelsior. The film was also partly edited in the hotel.

== See also ==
- East Point, Hong Kong
