= Clearness index =

Measure of atmosphere clearness

The clearness index is a measure of atmosphere clearness. It is calculated as the fraction of the actual total solar radiation on the surface of the Earth during a certain period over the theoretical maximum (i.e., clear sky) radiation during the same period. The clearness index is a dimensionless quantity and can vary from 0 (sky is completely covered) to 1 (perfectly sunny).

== See also ==
- Cloud cover
