= District cooling =

Delivery of chilled water to building needing cooling

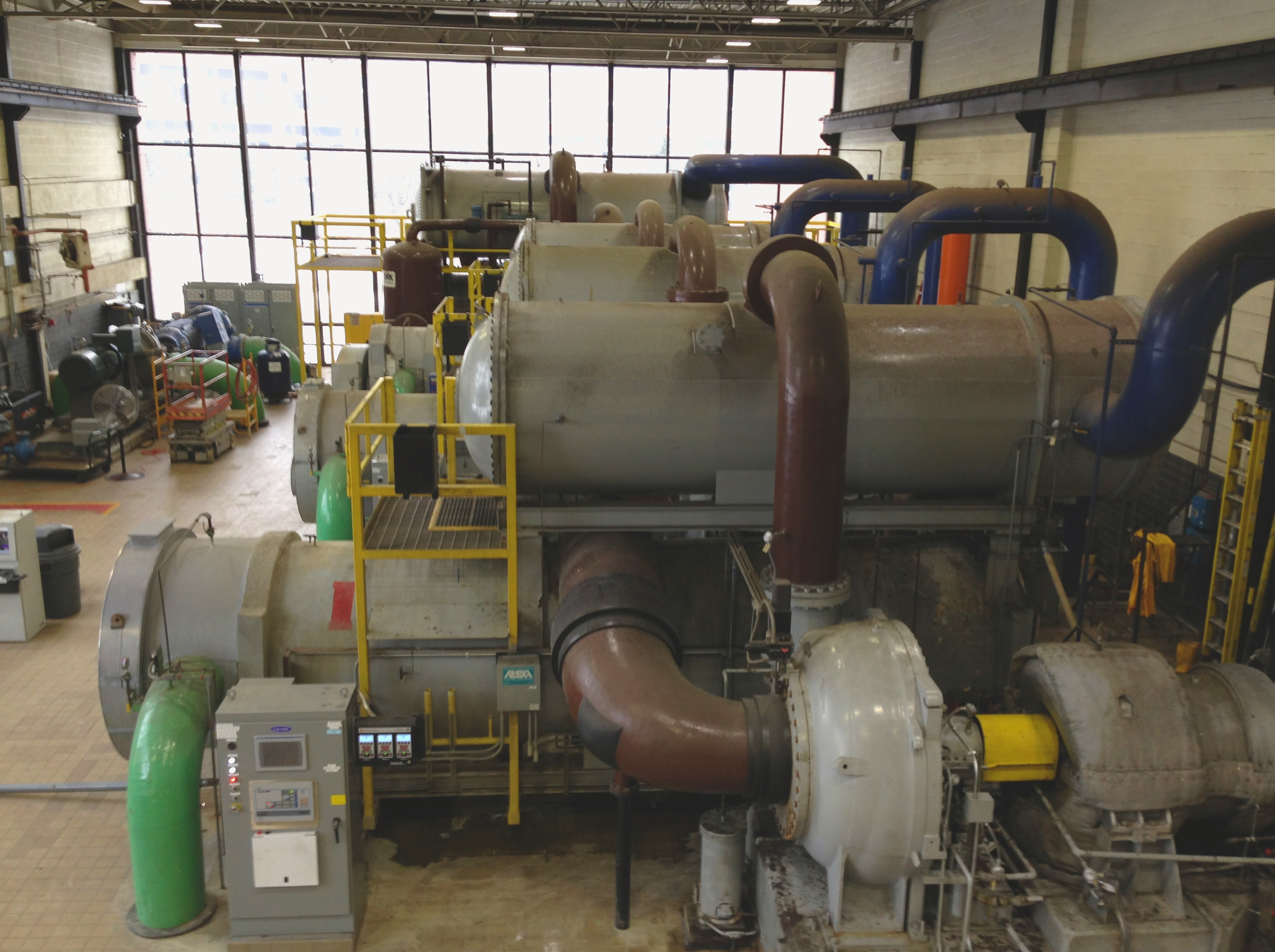
Chillers in a district cooling at University of Rochester in Rochester, New York

District cooling is the cooling equivalent of district heating. Working on principles broadly similar to district heating, district cooling delivers chilled water to buildings like offices and factories. In winter, the source for cooling can often be seawater, so it is a cheaper resource than electricity to run compressors for cooling. Alternatively, district cooling can be provided by a Heat Sharing Network which enables each building on the circuit to use a heat pump to redirect heat to an ambient ground temperature circuit.

There are also 5th generation district heating and cooling systems (so called cold district heating networks) that are able to provide both heating and cooling simultaneously. In these systems the waste heat from chillers can be recycled and used for space heating or hot water production.

== Applications ==
=== Canada ===
In September 2004, Enwave Energy Corporation, a district energy company based in Toronto, Ontario, Canada, started operating a system that uses water from Lake Ontario to cool downtown buildings, including office towers, the Metro Toronto Convention Centre, a small brewery and a telecommunications centre. The process has become known as Deep Lake Water Cooling (DLWC). It will provide for over 40,000 tons (140 MW) of cooling—a significantly larger system than has been installed elsewhere. Another feature of the Enwave system is that it is integrated with Toronto's drinking water supply. The Toronto drinking water supply required a new intake location that would be further from shore and deeper in the lake. This posed two problems for the utility that managed the city's drinking water supply:

1. The capital cost of moving the water intake location.

2. The new location would supply water that was so cold it would require heating before it could be distributed.

The cooperation of the district cooling agency, Enwave, solved both problems: Enwave paid for the cost of moving the water intake and also supplied the heat to warm the drinking water supply to acceptable levels by effectively extracting the heat from the buildings it served. Contact between drinking water and the Enwave cooling system is restricted to thermal contact in a heat exchanger. Drinking water does not circulate through the Enwave cooling systems.

=== France ===
The "Cold Network of Paris", managed by Fraîcheur de Paris (formerly Climespace), has existed in the city since 1991. The eight production facilities (400 MW) provide cooling to 500 clients for 412 GWh per year. This network is completely managed by Fraîcheur de Paris. Since 2002, two other production facilities have provided cooling reinforced by ice, in the cooling centers of Opéra/Galfa; they have a total cooling capacity of about 20,000 kWh. Paris also proposes to develop its cold network as part of its climate change plan. As part of the city's climate change plan, two "glaciers" were integrated into the network in 2006 at the Les Halles cooling center, which has a total cooling capacity of about 30,000 kWh: 44 MW come from cooling machines and 13 MW can be added during short periods to the Cold Network of Paris thanks to stocks of ice. Enertherm, located at La Défense, has the largest ice stock in Europe, with a capacity of 240 MWh.

Lyon also has a cold network, managed by Dalkia, which bought the network from Prodith.

=== Finland ===
The Helsinki district cooling system uses otherwise wasted heat from summer time CHP power generation units to run absorption refrigerators for cooling during summer time, greatly reducing electricity usage. In winter time, cooling is achieved more directly using sea water. The adoption of district cooling is estimated to reduce the consumption of electricity for cooling purposes by as much as 90 per cent and an exponential growth in usage is forecast. The idea is now being adopted in other Finnish cities.

=== Germany ===
In Germany, amongst other projects, Munich established a rapidly growing system in 2011 with its core below the Karlsplatz (Stachus), drawing water from the underground Stadtgrabenbach. There is a 24 km network, currently supplying 16 larger organizations. In 2011, the estimated total thermal power output of all district cooling systems in Germany was 160 Megawatt distributed over 90 km.

=== Hong Kong ===
A district cooling system is being implemented in the Kai Tak Development, utilizing water drawn from Victoria Harbour. It will deliver cooling services to approximately 50 buildings through 40 kilometers of underground chilled water pipes. The system has a cooling capacity of around 284 megawatts of refrigeration, serving an area of about 1.73 million square meters.

=== India ===
India's first district cooling system is operational in GIFT City (Gujarat International Finance Tec-City in Gujarat.). Currently ~10,000 TR capacity is operational which has capacity to upgrade up to 50000 TR.

=== Japan ===
The Shinjuku Shin-toshin district heating and cooling system in Tokyo began supplying chilled water and steam in 1971. It supplies 22 buildings, including the Tokyo Metropolitan Government Building, with a total serviced floor area of approximately 2.26 million square metres.

The plant was substantially rebuilt during the 1990s and incorporates gas-fired cogeneration, using recovered heat from electricity generation as part of its heating and cooling production. In 2013, a pipe connection began transferring chilled water between the Shinjuku Shin-toshin system and the neighboring Nishi-Shinjuku 1-chome system. A study estimated that sharing cooling between the two systems reduced annual primary-energy input by approximately 5% in the area studied.

=== Kuwait ===
A project started in 2012 in Kuwait for the Sabah Al-Salem University City with district cooling. It is capable of cooling a load of 72000 TR and it has two central utility plants with 36 chillers, 36 cooling towers and 2 TES (Thermal Energy Storage) tanks.

=== Netherlands ===
In 2006, a district cooling system came online in Amsterdam's Zuidas, drawing water from the Nieuwe Meer

=== Qatar ===
On November 9, 2010, the world's largest district cooling plant opened at The Pearl Island. This plant is owned and operated by Qatar District Cooling Company, Qatar Cool. It is capable of cooling a load of 130,000 tons (450 MW). The project was built by C.A.T International (part of C.A.T Group).

The Lusail City district cooling system will supply chilled water to end users through an integrated network with a connected cooling of 500,000 Tons of Refrigeration by utilizing multiple chiller plants which are Marina, Wadi, West and North.

=== Singapore ===
Singapore started district cooling with One Raffles Quay, located at Marina Bay in May 2006. The district cooling plant is operated by SP Group's subsidiary, Singapore District Cooling. A second district cooling plant was commissioned in May 2010, which will supply chilled water for the air-conditioning of buildings in the area through pipes housed within the Common Services Tunnel in Marina Bay. The second district cooling plant started operations on 3 March 2016.

Tengah, a planning area and Housing and Development Board (HDB) town, will be the first residential area in Singapore to have a large-scale centralized cooling system. Centralized chillers installed on the rooftops of some HDB flats pipe chilled water directly to individual units for use in air-conditioners.

=== Sweden ===
The use of district cooling is growing in Sweden, such as in Stockholm, whose cooling system has 71,000 TR.

=== Switzerland ===
Working since 1985, the system of the École Polytechnique Fédérale de Lausanne combines, depending on the needs, cooling and heat extraction. This allows for a higher overall energy efficiency of the 19 MW system.

In 2009, a district cooling system was installed in the United Nations area of Geneva, drawing water from Lake Geneva. The system is in the process of being expanded to other areas of Geneva.

=== United Arab Emirates ===
Emirates District Cooling (Emicool) is a district cooling service provider and a wholly owned subsidiary of Dubai Investments headquartered in Dubai investments park. It currently has 355,000 tonnes of refrigeration (TR) capacity that connects more than 2,200 buildings in the UAE. It is a member of the Dubai Supreme Council of Energy's first Association of District Cooling Operators.

Tabreed, headquartered in the UAE capital of Abu Dhabi, currently delivers more than 1.2 million refrigeration tons of cooling, from its portfolio of 86 plants located throughout the region. The company, founded in 1998, provides sustainable cooling to iconic infrastructure projects such as the Burj Khalifa, Sheikh Zayed Grand Mosque, Louvre Abu Dhabi, Cleveland Clinic, Ferrari World, The Dubai Mall, Yas Mall, Aldar HQ, Etihad Towers, Marina Mall, World Trade Center in Abu Dhabi, Dubai Metro, Bahrain Financial Harbor, and the Jabal Omar Development in the Holy City of Mecca, alongside many more hotels, hospitals, residential and commercial towers. During 2022 Tabreed entered the Egyptian market and expanded its operations in the Sultanate of Oman.

In January 2006, PAL technology is one of the emerging project management companies in UAE involved in the diversified business of desalination, sewage treatment and district cooling system. More than 400,000 Tons (1400 MW) of district cooling projects are planned. The Palm Jumeirah utilises district cooling supplied by Palm Utilities LLC to provide air conditioning for buildings on the trunk and crescent of the Palm. The Dubai Metro system, inaugurated in 2009, is the first mass transit network in the world to use district cooling to lower temperatures in stations.

=== United States ===
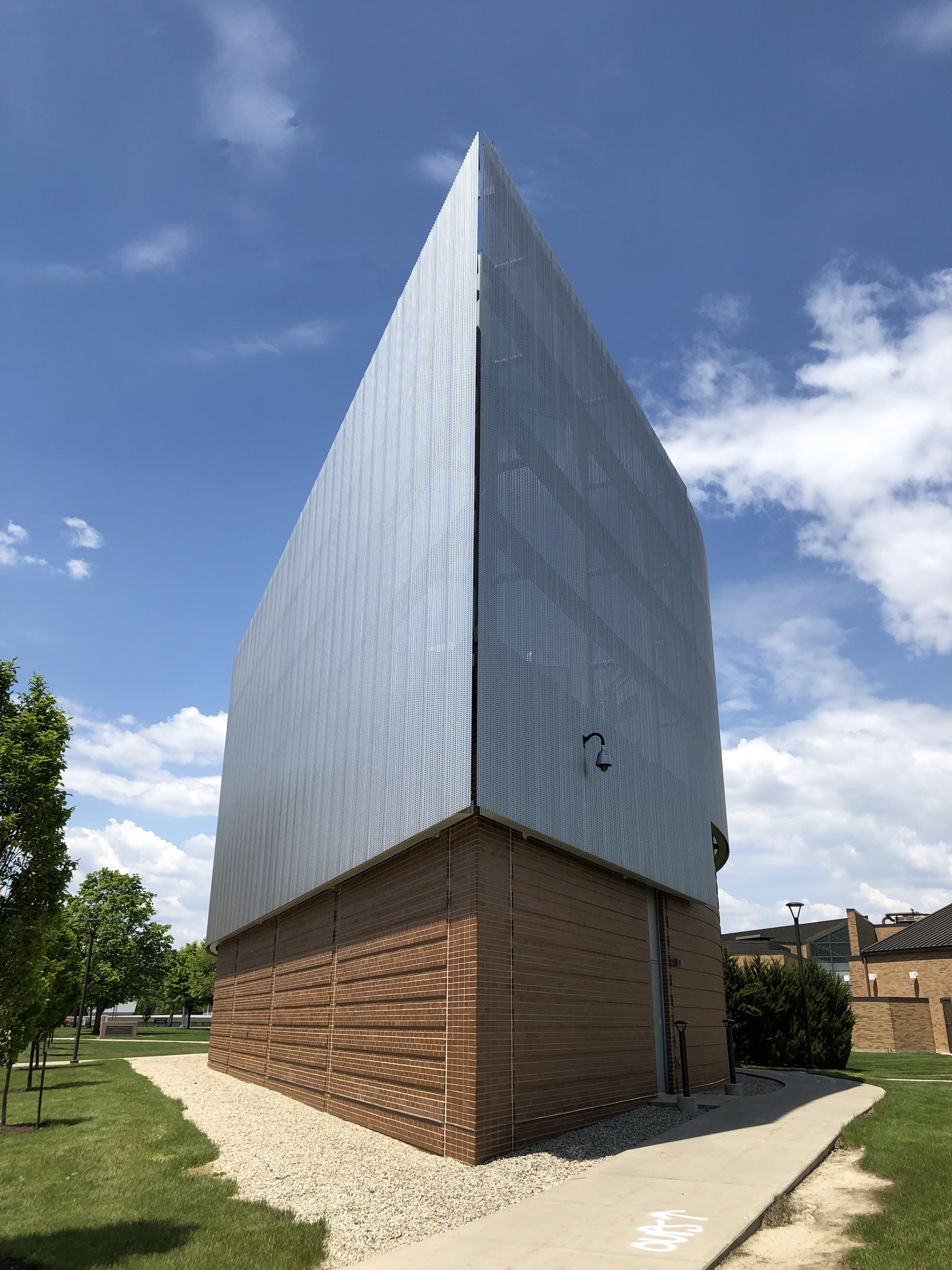
A district cooling plant at Bowling Green State University

Cornell University's Lake Source Cooling System uses Cayuga Lake as a heat sink to operate the central chilled water system for its campus and to also provide cooling to the Ithaca City School District. The system has operated since the summer of 2000 and was built at a cost of $55–60 million. It cools a 14,500 tons (50 MW) load.

== Cold storage ==
If the other renewable alternatives are too warm during the summer or too expensive, cold storage can be investigated. In large scale applications underground and snow storage are the most likely alternatives. In an underground storage the winter cold is heat exchanged from the air and loaded into the bedrock or an aquifer by one or more bore holes. In a snow storage frozen water (snow and/or ice) is saved in some kind of storage (pile, pit, cavern etc.). The cold is utilized by pumping melt water to the cooling object, directly in a district cooling system or indirect by a heat exchanger.

The lukewarm melt water is then pumped back to the snow where it gets cooled and mixed with new melt water. Snow cooling works as a single cold source but can also be used for peak cooling since there is no relevant cooling limit. In Sweden there is one snow cooling plant in Sundsvall, built and owned by the county. The cooling load in Sundsvall is about 2000 kW (570 tons of refrigeration) and 1500 MWh/year.

== Dehumidifying ==
Especially in subtropical regions not only cooling, but dehumidifying of the air becomes important. Liquid desiccant cooling allows to generate remotely and efficiently a moisture absorbing liquid. This liquid can be pumped or transported long distances without energy loss.

== Benefits ==
District Cooling System (DCS) consumes 35 percent to 20 percent less electricity as compared to traditional air-cooled air-conditioning systems and individual water-cooled air-conditioning systems using cooling towers respectively. With its high energy efficiency, the implementation of DCS at Kai Tak Development (KTD) will achieve estimated annual saving of 85 million kilowatt-hour (kWh) in electricity consumption, with a corresponding reduction of 59,500 tonnes of carbon dioxide emissions annually.

Apart from energy saving, DCS would also bring along the following benefits to the consumers:

1. Reduction in upfront capital cost for installing chiller plants at their buildings which account for about 5-10% of the total building cost.
2. More flexible building designs for consumer buildings as they do not need to install their own chillers and the associated electrical equipment in their buildings.
3. Mitigation of heat island effects in KTD and elimination of noise and vibration arising from the operation of heat rejection equipment and chillers of air-conditioning plants in buildings as such equipment will no longer be necessary for buildings subscribing to district cooling services.
4. More adaptable air-conditioning system to the varying demand as compared to individual air-conditioning systems. For each individual building, cooling capacity can be increased by requesting additional cooling capacity from the DCS without carrying out extensive modification works for the building in question.

== See also ==
- Deep water source cooling
- District heating
- Seasonal thermal energy storage (STES)
- Southampton District Energy Scheme, a combined district heating and cooling system
